= List of Enix home computer games =

The back cover of Door Door's NEC PC-8801 version, featuring a photo and resume of Koichi Nakamura

Enix was a Japanese video game publishing company founded in September 1975 by Yasuhiro Fukushima. Initially a tabloid publisher named Eidansha Boshu Service Center, in 1982 it ventured into video game publishing for Japanese home computers such as the PC-8800 series, the X1 series, and the FM-7. Fukushima had no programming knowledge and did not employ internal programmers or game designers. Instead, he held a contest for programming hobbyists in order to pool talents and publish selected games, with a ¥1 million award for the top prize (US$5,000). Few entries were received in the first month, but after a marketing campaign on television and in appliance stores, hobby clubs, computer and manga magazines, three hundred entries were received by the end of the "First Game Hobby Program Contest".

This contest allowed Enix to release numerous games with a wide variety of genres early on, as thirteen winning entries were polished and chosen for release in February 1983. Among these were Morita no Battle Field by Kazurou Morita; Door Door by Koichi Nakamura; and Love Match Tennis by Yuji Horii, a young columnist for Weekly Shōnen Jump. In addition to two more contests, Enix began recruiting developers on a project basis. For each project, Enix outsourced development and handled production and promotion duties, which made cost control more efficient. Unlike software houses of the time, Fukushima tried to instill a commercial mindset in his developers, as he thought games should be treated as books or movies in terms of copyright. He employed a royalty payment system between the company and the developers so that the latter would be compensated proportionally to the direct sales of their games. Each of Enix's home computer release featured a photo and resume of the developer on the back cover of the package.

Enix's home computer games were commercially successful; on their release, the first batch of February 1983 ranked first, second, third, fifth and seventh in the top ten Japanese best-selling games, leading to other game releases and a profit of ¥300 million (US$1.5 million) by the end of the year. Enix moved into traditional game publishing in 1985, beginning by porting its most successful home computer games to the Famicom console: Door Door, which sold 200,000 copies, and The Portopia Serial Murder Case, which sold 700,000. Enix soon focused primarily on publishing titles for consoles, though it continued to sell home computer games through to 1993. With the exception of the character designer Akira Toriyama, the development team of Enix's future flagship series Dragon Quest was recruited, thanks to the company's programming contests: Horii and Nakamura had won the first contest, and Koichi Sugiyama was contacted after sending in a questionnaire postcard for Morita Kazurou no Shogi.

== List by year ==
=== 1983 ===
| Month | Title | Platform(s) | Details |
|---|---|---|---|
| February (winning entries in the 1st Game Hobby Program Contest) | Morita no Battle Field (森田のバトルフィールド, Morita no Batoru Fīrudo) | NEC PC-8801 | Turn-based strategy game by Kazuro Morita. |
| February (winning entries in the 1st Game Hobby Program Contest) | Door Door (ドア・ドア, Doa Doa) | NEC PC-8801, other models | Puzzle game by Koichi Nakamura.; Ported to the Famicom in 1985 and mobile phones in 2004. |
| February (winning entries in the 1st Game Hobby Program Contest) | Guest Mariko Hashimoto (マリちゃん危機一髪, Mari-chan Kikiippatsu) | FM-8, other models | Adult game by Tadashi Makimura. |
| February (winning entries in the 1st Game Hobby Program Contest) | Cosmic Soldier (宇宙の戦士, Uchū no Senshi) | NEC PC-8801 | Shooter game by Yoshiyuki Okada. |
| February (winning entries in the 1st Game Hobby Program Contest) | D.I.S Airport (Ｄ・Ｉ・Ｓエアポート, D.I.S Eapōto) | Sharp X1 | Game by Seiji Fujihara. |
| February (winning entries in the 1st Game Hobby Program Contest) | Seiko's Adventure (星子のアドベンチャー, Seiko no Adobenchā) | NEC PC-8801 | Adventure game by Toshiyuki Asanuma. |
| February (winning entries in the 1st Game Hobby Program Contest) | Underground Monster (地底のモンスター, Chitei no Monsutā) | NEC PC-8801, other models | Maze game by Osamu Hasegawa. |
| February (winning entries in the 1st Game Hobby Program Contest) | Bacteria Escape (バクテリアエスケープ, Bakuteria Esukēpu) | FM-7, other models | Maze game by Tomoshige Hashishita. |
| February (winning entries in the 1st Game Hobby Program Contest) | Napoleon (ナポレオン, Naporeon) | NEC PC-6001 | Card game by Hiroaki Shimada. |
| February (winning entries in the 1st Game Hobby Program Contest) | Love Match Tennis (ラブマッチテニス, Rabu Macchi Tenisu) | NEC PC-6001 | Tennis game by Yuji Horii. |
| February (winning entries in the 1st Game Hobby Program Contest) | Bōsō! Orient Kyūkō (暴走！オリエント急行, Bōsō! Oriento Kyūkō) | Sharp MZ-80K, other models | Action game by Toshiyuki Nagase. |
| February (winning entries in the 1st Game Hobby Program Contest) | Piranha-kun no Isshūkan (ピラニア君の一週間, Pirania-kun no Isshūkan) | Sharp MZ-80B, other models | Action game by Atsushi Shirai. |
| February (winning entries in the 1st Game Hobby Program Contest) | Poker Extra (ポーカーエキストラ, Pōka Ēkisutora) | NEC PC-8001, other models | Card game by Masahiro Kawaguchi. |
| June | Alphos (アルフォス, Arufosu) | NEC PC-8801, other models | Shoot 'em up by Random House (Kazurou Morita's company), based on Namco's title Xevious. |
| June | The Portopia Serial Murder Case (ポートピア連続殺人事件, Pōtopia Renzoku Satsujin Jiken) | NEC PC-6001, other models | Adventure game designed by Yuji Horii.; Ported to the Famicom in 1985 and mobile phones in 2001. |
| June | Raita no Growing Up (雷太のグローイングアップ, Raita no Gurōinguappu) | NEC PC-6001, other models | Action game by Hiroaki Shimada. |
| June | Titan Bōeisen (タイタン防衛戦, Taitan Bōeisen) | Sharp X1 | |
| June | Gekisen! Minamitaiheiyō (激戦！南太平洋) | NEC PC-8801, other models | Action game by Osamu Hasegawa. |
| June | Joshiryō Panic (女子寮パニック, Joshiryō Panikku) | FM-7, other models | Adventure game by Tadashi Makimura. |
| June | Light Flipper (ライト・フリッパー, Raito Furippā) | NEC PC-8801, other models | Maze game by Yoshiyuki Okada. |
| June | Toward 8 (トワード８, Towādo 8) | Sharp X1, other models | |
| October (winning entries in the 2nd Game Hobby Program Contest) | Fan Fun (ファンファン, Fan Fan) | NEC PC-8001, other models | Action game by Yasuhiro Miyata. |
| October (winning entries in the 2nd Game Hobby Program Contest) | Game Kyōjin no Uchū Ryokō (芸夢狂人の宇宙旅行) | NEC PC-8001mkII, other models | Shoot 'em up by Takanari Suzuki. |
| October (winning entries in the 2nd Game Hobby Program Contest) | Dokuron no Yakata (ドクロンの館) | Sharp X1, other models | Action game by Takashi Goto. |
| October (winning entries in the 2nd Game Hobby Program Contest) | Kagirinaki Tatakai (限りなき戦い) | Sharp X1, other models | Run & gun shooter game by Hiroshi Ishikawa. |
| October (winning entries in the 2nd Game Hobby Program Contest) | Lolita Syndrome (ロリータ・シンドローム, Rorīta Shindorōmu) | FM-7, other models | Adult game by Katsumi Mochizuki. |
| October (winning entries in the 2nd Game Hobby Program Contest) | Fushigi na Tabi (不思議な旅) | FM-7, other models | Adventure game by Tadashi Sugie. |
| October (winning entries in the 2nd Game Hobby Program Contest) | Tropical Boy (トロピカルボーイ, Toropikaru Boī) | NEC PC-8801 | Action game by Takeshi Nakazawa. |
| October (winning entries in the 2nd Game Hobby Program Contest) | Mazeland | Sharp MZ-700 | Maze game by Takashi Shimizu, based on the manga Dr. Slump. |
| October (winning entries in the 2nd Game Hobby Program Contest) | Magnetic Field (マグネチックフィールド, Magunechikku Fīrudo) | NEC PC-8001mkII, other models | Puzzle game by Hideyuki Akiyama |
| October (winning entries in the 2nd Game Hobby Program Contest) | PushMan (プッシュマン, Pusshuman) | NEC PC-8001, other models | Puzzle game by Masashi Hijikata. |
| October (winning entries in the 2nd Game Hobby Program Contest) | Checker Flag (チェッカーフラッグ, Chiekkā Furaggu) | NEC PC-8801, other models | Racing game by Masao Aoba. |
| October (winning entries in the 2nd Game Hobby Program Contest) | Cosmo Crash (コスモクラッシュ, Kosumo Kurasshu) | FM-7 | Shoot 'em up by Kazuhiro Hasegawa. |
| October (winning entries in the 2nd Game Hobby Program Contest) | Lovely Asuka (Ｌｏｖｅｌｙ飛鳥) | FM-7 | Adventure game by Hiroyuki Odawara. |
| November | Parallel World (パラレルワールド, Parareru Wārudo) | Sharp X1, other models | Role-playing game by Toshiyuki Nagase. |

=== 1984 ===
| Month | Title | Platform(s) | Details |
|---|---|---|---|
| May | Newtron (ニュートロン, Nyūtoron) | NEC PC-8801, other models | Puzzle game by Chunsoft (Koichi Nakamura's company).; Ported to mobile phones in 2004. |
| May | New Fan Fun (ニューファンファン, Nyūfanfan) | NEC PC-6001mkII, other models | Action game by Yasuhiro Miyata. |
| May | No.1 Golf (Ｎｏ．１ゴルフ, No.1 Gorufu) | Sharp X1, other models | Golf game by Masashi Muramori. |
| June | Blizzard (ブリザード, Burizādo) | Sharp-1500 | |
| June | High School Adventure (ハイスクールアドベンチャー, Hai Sukūru Adobenchā) | FM77 | |
| July | Gootsn (グッツン, Guttsun) | Sharp X1 | Puzzle game by Komei Kato. |
| July | Rukteu Dark Castle: Dragon Angel's Miracle Voyage (暗黒城, Ankoku Shiro) | FM-7, other models | Game by Random House. |
| July | Flipflop (フリップフロップ, Furippufuroppu) | FM-7, other models | Puzzle game by Teshige Dokite. |
| August | Karakuri Ninpou (カラクリ忍法) | NEC PC-8801 | Game by Takeshi Nakazawa. |
| August | Swarm (スウォーム, Sūōmu) | Sharp X1, other models | |
| August | Zarth (ザース, Zāsu) | FM-7, other models | Game by Studio Jandora. |
| September | Arale no Jump Up (アラレのJump up) | NEC PC-8001mkII | Action game by Takanari Suzuki, based on the manga Dr. Slump. |
| September | Magic Garden (マジックガーデン, Majikku Gāden) | NEC PC-8801, other models | Game by Toru Hidaka. |
| November | Wingman (ウイングマン, Uinguman) | NEC PC-8801, other models | Game by Tam Tam, based on the Wingman manga series. |
| November | Shabon Tama Arare (シャボン玉アラレ) | NEC PC-6001mkII | |
| December | Gumball (ガムボール, Gamubōru) | NEC PC-8801mkII, other models | Japanese version of the game of the same name developed by Broderbund. |
| December (winning entries in the 3rd Game Hobby Program Contest) | Blue Fox (ブルーフォックス, Burū Fokkusu) | FM-7, other models | |
| December (winning entries in the 3rd Game Hobby Program Contest) | Zunou 4989 (頭脳４９８９) | FM-7, other models | Game by Kazuo Ohashi. |
| December (winning entries in the 3rd Game Hobby Program Contest) | Again (アゲイン, Agein) | FM-7, other models | Adventure game by Yuhei Yamaguchi, co-published by Enix and Random House. |
| Unknown | Dr. Slump Bubble Daisakusen (Dr.スランプ バブル大作戦, Dr. Suranpu Baburu Daisakusen) | | Shooter game by Koji Okamoto, based on the manga Dr. Slump. |
| Unknown | The Hokkaido Serial Murder Case: The Okhotsk Disappearance (北海道連鎖殺人 オホーツクに消ゆ) | | Visual novel adventure game by Yuji Horii. |

=== 1985 ===
| Month | Title | Platform(s) | Details |
|---|---|---|---|
| January | El Dorado Denki (エルドラド伝奇, Eru Dorado Denki) | FM-7, other models | |
| February | Door Door mk2 (ドアドアｍｋ２, Doa Doa mk2) | Sharp MZ-1500, other models | |
| February | Hashire Senbeisan (走れせんべいさん) | Sharp X1, other models | Run & gun shooter game by Takashi Goto, based on the manga Dr. Slump. |
| February | Zaxus (ザクサス, Zakusasu) | NEC PC-8001, other models | Game by Yasuhiro Miyata. |
| February | Typing Exercise (ゲームDeタイプ, Gēmu De Taipu) | | Educational game by Chunsoft. |
| April | Tokyo Nampa Street (Ｔｏｋｙｏナンパストリート, Tokyo Nanpa Sutorīto) | FM-7, other models | Collaboration between Yuji Horii and manga artist Hikaru Sekino. |
| May | Karuizawa Yūkai Annai (軽井沢誘拐案内) | NEC PC-8801, other models | Adventure game by Yuji Horii.; Ported to mobile phones in 2001. |
| July | World Golf (ワールドゴルフ, Wārudo Gorufu) | | Golf game by Masashi Muramori. |
| August | Morita Kazurou no Shogi (森田和郎の将棋) | NEC PC-9801, other models | Shogi game by Random House. |
| November | Xevious (ゼビウス, Zebiusu) | NEC PC-8801 | |
| November | Savior (セイバー, Seibā) | NEC PC-9801E, other models | |
| November | The Earth Fighter Rayieza (地球戦士ライーザ, Chikyū Senshi Raīza) | FM-7, other models | Role-playing game by Makoto Kuba. |
| November | Pac-Land (パックランド, Pakku-Rando) | NEC PC-8001mkII | Based on the arcade game by Namco. |
| Unknown | Brain Breaker (ブレインブレイカー, Burein Bureikā) | Sharp X1, other models | Open-world platform-adventure game by Hiroshi Ishikawa. |
| Unknown | Phalanx (ロゲームファンサイト, Falancse) | MSX | |

=== 1986 ===
| Month | Title | Platform(s) | Details |
|---|---|---|---|
| April | Wingman 2: Kītakurā no Fukkatsu (ウイングマン２ キータクラーの復活, Uinguman 2: Kītakurā no Fukkatsu) | NEC PC-8801, Sharp X1, MSX | Sequel of Wingman; First game with music by Koichi Sugiyama |
| May | Cannon Shot (キャノンショット, Kyanon Shotto) | SMC-777 | Pool Game by Takashi Shimizu |
| November | Dragon Quest (ドラゴンクエスト, Doragon Kuesuto) | MSX2, other models | |
| Unknown | Hokuto no Ken (北斗の拳) | | Game by Toru Hidaka, based on the Fist of the North Star manga series. |

=== 1987 ===
| Month | Title | Platform(s) | Details |
|---|---|---|---|
| April | Jesus (ジーザス, Jīzasu) | NEC PC-8801 VA, other models | Adventure game by Game Kyojin. |
| May | Gandhara: Buddha no Seisen (ガンダーラ 仏陀の聖戦, Gandāra: Budda no Seisen) | NEC PC-8801 VA, MSX2 | Game by Toru Hidaka. |
| July | Animal Land Murder Case (アニマルランド殺人事件, Animaru Rando Satsujin Jiken) | MSX | |
| August | Dragon Buster (ドラゴンバスター, Doragon Basutā) | NEC PC-8801 VA, other models | Based on the arcade game by Namco. |
| October | World Golf II (ワールドゴルフII, Wārudo Gorufu II) | NEC PC-8801 VA, Sharp X1, MSX2 | Golf game by Masashi Muramori. |
| December | Wingman Special (ウイングマンスペシャル, Uinguman Supesharu) | NEC PC-8801 FA, other models | The sequel to Wingman 2. |

=== 1988 ===
| Month | Title | Platform(s) | Details |
|---|---|---|---|
| February | Dragon Quest II (ドラゴンクエストII, Doragon Kuesuto II) | MSX | |
| July | Angelus: Akuma no Fukuin (アンジェラス～悪魔の福音～, Anjierasu: Akuma no Fukuin) | PC-8801, PC-9801, MSX2 | Adventure game composed by Koichi Sugiyama. |
| December | The Old Village Story | NEC PC-8801 FE, other models | |

=== 1989 ===
| Month | Title | Platform(s) | Details |
|---|---|---|---|
| February | Burning Point (バーニングポイント, Bāningu Pointo) | NEC PC-8801 FE, other models | |
| March | Morita Shogi 2 (森田将棋２) | NEC PC-9801 RA, other models | Shogi game by Random House. |
| December | Prajator: Image Ranger (プラジェータ, Purajiēta) | NEC PC-8801 FE, other models | |

=== 1990 ===
| Month | Title | Platform(s) | Details |
|---|---|---|---|
| March | Misty Blue (ミスティ・ブルー, Misuti Burū) | NEC PC-8801 MC, other models | Music by Yuzo Koshiro. |
| April | Ryūou Hanyuu Yoshiharu Jissen Shū (竜王 羽生善治実践集) | NEC PC-9801 RA, other models | By Random House. |
| May | 4.6 Billion Year Story (４６億年物語ＴＨＥ進化論) | PC-9801 | |
| July | Formula C.M.S | NEC PC-8801 SR, other models | |
| September | Shutendouji (手天童子) | NEC PC-9801 VM, other models | |
| October | World Golf III (ワールドゴルフIII, Wārudo Gorufu III) | PC-8801, PC-9801, X68000 | Golf game by Masashi Muramori. |

=== 1991 ===
| Month | Title | Platform(s) | Details |
|---|---|---|---|
| January | Reichsritter (ライヒスリッター, Raihisurittā) | NEC PC-9801 RA, other models | |
| March | Jesus 2 (ジーザス2, Jīzasu 2) | PC-8801, PC-9801, X68000 | |
| August | Gunyū Sangokushi (群雄三国志) | NEC PC-9801 VM, other models | |
| November | Code-0 (コード０, Kōdo 0) | X68000 | Shooter game by Random House. |
| December | Fangs: The Saga of Wolf Blood (ファングス, Fangusu) | NEC PC-8801 FH, other models | |

=== 1993 ===
| Month | Title | Platform(s) | Details |
|---|---|---|---|
| October | Morita Shogi 4 (森田将棋４) | NEC PC-9801 DA, other models | Shogi game by Random House. |
