= Jesus (video game) =

1987 video game

- Developer: Enix
- Publisher: Enix
- Director: Takanari Suzuki
- Producer: Yutaka Takano
- Programmer: Takanari Suzuki
- Artist: Shintaro Majima
- Writer: Koji Miya
- Composer: Koichi Sugiyama
- Platforms: PC-8801, FM-7, MSX2, X1, Famicom
- Release: PC-8801: JP: April 28, 1987; FM-7: JP: July 1987; MSX2: JP: October 21, 1987; X1: JP: November 1987; Famicom: JP: March 17, 1989
- Genre: Graphic adventure
- Mode: Single-player

Jesus is a graphic adventure game developed and published by Enix. It was first released in 1987 on the PC-8801, FM-7, X1, and the MSX2 and was later ported to the Famicom in 1989 as Jesus: Kyōfu no Bio Monster ("Jesus: Bio Monster of Terror"). A sequel, Jesus II, was released on the PC-8801, PC-9801, and X68000 in 1991.

The game's name refers to a space station called J.E.S.U.S., named after the central Christian figure Jesus. The ship is shaped like a double-edged sword à la Book of Revelation. Its inhabitants go on to fight a mysterious demonic alien from Halley's Comet.

== Plot ==
The game takes place in 2061. Halley's Comet has been approaching Mars and the nations of Earth send a mission to investigate.

Musou Hayao is stationed on the space lab J.E.S.U.S. He speaks with his commanding officer on the station, who requests that he track down the members of the two crews being sent to the comet to deliver access cards. Hayao meets with 7 different crew members during this time: a Chinese doctor, German captain, Soviet captain, American xenobiologist, French mathematician, Italian computer engineer, and Brazilian astronomer. The mathematician is also Hayao's love interest, Eline. They share a heartfelt goodbye, as they would be boarding different ships for the mission which depart two weeks apart from another, with Eline's ship leaving for the comet first. Eline is a musician, and plays him a song that she wrote before he leaves.

Hayao's ship arrives at Halley's comet. Hayao is sent to investigate the first ship and finds most of the crew missing. Eline's intelligent robot pet Fojii is found in the ship's docking bay, and after updating its data offers Hayao assistance in tracking down the missing crew members. Unfortunately, many are found dead or dying, whispering dire warnings to Hayao about something sinister on board. A crew member tells Hayao that fire cannot hurt "it". None of the dead crew display any physical signs of harm except for a small pinprick on one of their fingers.

Hayao accesses journal entries and video recordings showing a xenomorph-like creature attacking those on the ship. Recordings also say that Eline fled the alien creature and hid, giving Hayao hope that she may still be alive on the ship. While searching for Eline, Hayao and Fojii eventually come face-to-face with the monster. They do not manage to kill it upon first encounter, only slowing its movements to ensure that it cannot chase after them.

Hayao finds Eline hiding in an engine room and the pair make plans to use the shuttlepods to escape the spaceship. The shuttles can only take one passenger, so Eline uses the first shuttle, with Hayao following shortly after. Before he leaves, he encounters the alien monster once more, and it leaves behind a piece of its skin. Hayao contacts the xenobiologist, who requests he bring back the sample for further study.

Back on the first ship, the xenobiologist Carson begins research into the alien monster, but soon enough the "sample" of the monster breaks free and hides on the ship. Hayao and Carson suspect that the alien is able to regrow itself from the sample. While searching the ship for clues, Hayao discovers the doctor's cryogenic pod has been used when only she should have access to it, and the astronomer's favourite food (hamburgers) is found littered in one of the storage bays. In a briefing room, a tape recording of Eline's song can be found, and it starts playing randomly over the comms as the player explores the ship only to abruptly stop. Upon returning to the room, the tape containing Eline's song is crushed. Suddenly, Carson is attacked by the monster and is missing, presumably dead. Hayao's commanding officer from the J.E.S.U.S. arrives to aid in capturing and killing the monster at any costs. Hayao and Eline board the commander's vessel and they plan their next attempt to locate and ultimately destroy the monster.

Carson manages to send a signal from the first ship, and Hayao goes back to investigate. The monster has also boarded the ship, and breaks out of a nearby vent to attack. Hayao and Eline manage to escape due to the commander's sacrifice, closing the door behind him, pushing the two out to safety on the primary ship. They hide in the cryopods, fearful of the alien's next moves. Hayao manages to get a distress signal to J.E.S.U.S. The alien monster – now more evolved – begins to speak to them in a strange language. Eline notes that the language sounds like many human languages mangled together, and Fojii begins decrypting the speech until they are able to communicate with it. The alien's speech is a combination of Chinese, German, Russian, English, Italian, and Portuguese – making it clear that the alien has taken knowledge and memories from each of the crew members that it killed, using the DNA it stole from their bodies to evolve.

The monster informs Hayao that it has taken control of the ship and plans to head for J.E.S.U.S. in order to conquer mankind, killing them for the sake of advanced evolution. Hayao and Eline try bargaining with the alien to no avail, until Hayao bluffs and claims that he has a remote detonator he will use to destroy the ship if the alien does not meet with them. They lure the alien further into the ship while considering their options, and Fojii helps Hayao recall what happened when the tape of Eline's song started playing – the monster was the one who crushed the tape, finding the harmony unbearable to its foreign biology. He takes Eline's synthesizer and confronts the alien in front of an airlock, then plays Eline's song.

The monster is disabled long enough for Hayao to jettison the creature out into space, but not before hearing – telepathically – the voices of all the crew members that were killed. They tell Hayao and Eline that their memories live on inside the alien creature and they are one and the same being now, although they are long gone. They assure the two that humanity will have the strength to fight this new breed of monster even if it returns in an attempt to destroy mankind some day, which they suspect it will. Hayao and Eline hold one another on the ship for a while, staring into the void of space, knowing that they will have to tell the tales of their fallen colleagues and prepare Earth for a future confrontation when Halley's comet returns.

== Gameplay ==
The game proceeds as a linear adventure game in which the player chooses an action and what to perform the action on. These actions vary based on the room and situation. Although the game implies some danger at various points, it does not seem to be possible to lose. There are three main sections of the game, although the first section is mostly an introduction to the other characters of it.

== Development and release ==
Jesus was developed by a small group working at publisher Enix in an office adjacent to the seminal Dragon Quest series. The story for Jesus was penned by Koji Miya, a freelance author of several puzzle books who also wrote an adventure adaptation of the 1985 Sakyo Komatsu science fiction novel Tokyo Blackout. The game's scenario was completed on November 18, 1985 and the remaining team members were assembled from that point. Due to the length of the story there was discussion about making the game five discs before it was reduced to three.

The game was programmed by Takanari Suzuki (also known as Geimu Kiyoto/Kyoujin) whose previous credits with Enix include Arale no Jump Up and the PC-8801 port of Xevious. Suzuki was reluctant to work on Jesus as he was disinterested in adventure and role-playing games, but was informed that the shooter genre he preferred was becoming less popular at the time. He additionally found it much harder to develop games in a group than to work alone. Susuki's Space Mouse, which he originally wrote in 1981 as a type-in program for PC-8001, was included as a minigame in Jesus.

Shintaro Majima was the artist for Jesus and had previously contributed graphic design and package illustrations on other Enix titles like The Earth Fighter Rayieza, Savior, and the Famicom port of The Portopia Serial Murder Case. He was unable to decide on a graphics tool for the first four months of development on Jesus so he arduously used the numerical keys. Due to small screen sizes and a limited number of available colors on earlier PCs, Majima alternated hues in checker patterns in order to bleed them together and give the appearance of a larger pallette. He drew over 150 images for the project. The musical score was composed by Koichi Sugiyama, most famous for his work on the Dragon Quest series. Majima pointed out that the use of music in Jesus was unique at the time in that it was similar to a film soundtrack, playing constantly in the background instead of just at pivotal moments or during screen transitions. The overworld theme from the first Dragon Quest makes a cameo in Jesus.

Jesus was released exclusively in Japan for the PC-8801, FM-7, Sharp X1, and MSX2 during 1987. A Famicom port developed by Chunsoft and published by King Records, fully titled Jesus: Kyōfu no Bio Monster, was released in Japan on March 17, 1989. Several changes were made to this version. Game overs, minigames, puzzles, and sexually-explicit scenes were all removed while the robot sidekick FOJY was made into a comic relief character. The name FOJY is a reference to Enix with each letter being one removed from the spelling of the company.

A sequel, Jesus II, was released for PC-8801, PC-9801, and X68000 in 1991. It continues the story with a different hero and some of the surviving cast from the first game. It also retained its same development staff. However, although Miya had signed on to write the story for Jesus II he left in the middle of its long and difficult production after a dispute. He allegedly took the original scenario with him to use for the Victor Entertainment game Prontis. Suzuki also exited partway through to study abroad in the United States and retire from game programming in favor of becoming a medical doctor. Sugiyama continued composing music for Enix, most prominently the Dragon Quest franchise, in the following decades. Majima began contributing to the Dragon Quest series shortly after the release of Jesus II and went on to become president and CEO of game studio ArtePiazza.
