= Brain Breaker =

Sharp X1 action-adventure game

- Cover art by Shintaro Majima
- Developer: Hiroshi Ishikawa
- Publisher: Enix
- Platform: Sharp X1
- Release: JP: November 1985
- Genre: Action-adventure
- Mode: Single-player

Brain Breaker (ブレインブレイカー, Bureinbureikā) is an action-adventure platform game released for the Sharp X1 exclusively in Japan by Enix in November 1985. The game follows protagonist Sayaka, who crash lands and becomes trapped on an alien planet by a rogue, computer defense system. The game is a side-scroller taking place in a large, interconnected world and requires the player to acquire ability-expanding items to progress.

Brain Breaker was created by Hiroshi Ishikawa, who had previously programmed the Enix-published X1 title Kagirinaki Tatakai. Development on Brain Breaker took substantially more time and computer memory than Ishikawa's last title. Brain Breaker is now considered an early example within the Metroidvania genre. The game earned praise for its isolated setting and lonely atmosphere.

== Gameplay ==
The player rides elevators to reach portions of the world. Various commands are displayed at the bottom of the screen.

Brain Breaker is a side-scrolling, action-adventure platform game. The player takes on the role of female protagonist Sayaka, whose spaceship Zeppelin crash lands on a mysterious and seemingly uninhabited alien planet that is in fact controlled by a computer defense system gone rogue. Starting with no possessions other than a radio, the player must find more equipment and items in order to disable the computer and escape.

At the beginning of the game, the player can do little but run, jump, and contact Sayaka's ship for clues. Buildings can be explored and elevators can be ridden to access different levels. By exploring the planet, they will find new items that will expand their abilities, such as a laser rifle, a jet pack, wall-melting psychic powers, and the eponymous Brain Breaker, which disables electronic devices. The player can jump or the jet pack with the up-key; attack with the space bar; pick up and drop items with the Z-key; and use special options with the F-keys including calling one's ship with an ASK command and creating a save state at the current position.

== Development ==
Brain Breaker was created by programmer Hiroshi Ishikawa, who was just 18 years old at the time of its release. He started programming games on a VIC-1001 and purchased a Sharp X1 as a freshman in high school in May 1983. Ishikawa wrote his first commercial product Kagirinaki Tatakai in a single month and it a won a contest held by publisher Enix. After converting the game to the PC-8801, he went back to the X1 and started working on Brain Breaker in the spring of 1984. Built in assembly language and using the X1's full 64KB of RAM, it took Ishikawa over 18 months and 20 times the amount of code as Kagirinaki Tatakai. He completed Brain Breaker by November 1985 just before he took his college entrance exams. The game was released in Japan late that same month.

Enix once again signed on as the game's publisher. Its package was illustrated by Shintaro Majima, who had contributed art to other Enix titles including Savior, Phalanx, The Earth Fighter Rayieza, and the Famicom version of The Portopia Serial Murder Case. The background music in Brain Breaker is a rendition of "Union of the Snake" by Duran Duran. Ishikawa is a self-professed fan of the group along with many other musical acts. The game's title is shared with a song by Japanese metal band Dementia while the game's mothership takes part of the name of the rock band Led Zeppelin. Kagirinaki Tatakai itself is a Japanese translation of the Led Zeppelin track "The Battle of Evermore", but Ishikawa has implied that this was all coincidence. After the release of Brain Breaker, he stopped programming for two years before doing the MSX port of Kaiketsu Yanchamaru. He then left the gaming industry to teach natural science as a university professor.

== Reception and legacy ==
The February 1986 issue of Japan's Oh!MZ labeled Brain Breaker as an action role-playing game with a unique feel. The magazine lauded the game's depiction of a chaotic, futuristic setting; its sense of scale; and its cold, lonely atmosphere complimented by its strange background music.

In more recent years, the gameplay structure has been reinterpreted as an early example of a Metroidvania that predates both of the genre's namesakes Metroid and Castlevania. Like Oh!MZ, John Szczepaniak of Hardcore Gaming 101 praised its "haunting sense of loneliness" aiding by its music, likening the feeling to the game Damocles. He also said that the game plays like an overworld version of Metroid crossed with Elevator Action and Impossible Mission, but more complex than those titles. Szczepaniak went on to praise it for containing obfuscated progression design found in titles like Legacy of the Wizard and Castlevania II: Simon's Quest, challenging the player in ways most modern games fail to do.
