= Kagirinaki Tatakai =

Sharp X1 platformer/shooter game

- Developer: Hiroshi Ishikawa
- Publisher: Enix
- Platform: Sharp X1
- Release: JP: October 1983
- Genres: Platformer, shooter
- Mode: Single-player

Kagirinaki Tatakai (限りなき戦い; literally "Endless Battle") is a platformer and shooter game developed by Hiroshi Ishikawa and published by Enix exclusively for the Sharp X1 in Japan. Gameplay involves the player descending a vertical, underground shaft while facing enemies and projectiles. Equipped with a jet pack for maneuvering in the air, the player can engage adversaries with a raygun, a rocket launcher, or bombs. The latter two weapons can also destroy any portion of the stage for the player to create cover or to dig out new paths to advance.

Inspired by the science fiction novel Starship Troopers by Robert A. Heinlein, Ishikawa developed Kagirinaki Tatakai in just one month after starting high school. The game was a third-place runner-up in a contest held by Enix to publish software from new designers. It was released in October 1983 and sold meagerly. A PC-8801 port was cancelled and Ishikawa completed only one other game, 1985's Brain Breaker for the X1, before changing careers. Kagirinaki Tatakai has been noted for its inclusion of fully-destructible environments.

== Gameplay ==
The player uses explosives to destroy the scenery above some enemies. The player's score and remaining lives, bombs, and rockets are displayed at the top.

Kagirinaki Tatakai is a platformer and shooter game in which the player must vertically descend an underground shaft while engaging or avoiding hostile enemies and projectiles. The goal is to reach and destroy a red core that lies at a depth of 600 meters. The player character wears a powered suit and can use a jet pack to hover in the air and reach platforms. The player begins with a set number of lives and a game over will result should they deplete. A score increases as the player descends and whenever enemies are defeated.

Enemies and hazards include aliens, gun-wielding infantrymen, stationary turrets, flying saucers, and homing missiles. The player can freely switch between three weapons: a raygun with infinite ammunition and a limited number of both rockets and bombs. The game's standout feature is its fully destructible environments, as rockets (fired horizontally) and bombs (thrown at a downward angle) can be used to obliterate any wall or floor. This adds a strategic element, giving the player options like creating cover from enemy fire or digging out new paths to bypass groups of enemies.

== Development ==
Kagirinaki Tatakai was developed entirely by Hiroshi Ishikawa, who was 16 years-old and just entering high school at the time. He began programming his own games on a VIC-1001 in March 1981 before purchasing a Sharp X1 in May 1983. Kagirinaki Tatakai was his first commercial product. The game was largely inspired by the science fiction novel Starship Troopers by Robert A. Heinlein, specifically a scene towards its end where the protagonists, wearing powered suits, use grenades and rockets to fight spider-like aliens in tunnels. The player character's physical movements were borrowed from 1973's Moonlander while homing missiles that appear in the game were taken from Time Pilot. It took Ishikawa one month to program the initial version, accomplished with a BASIC compiler from Hudson Soft.

Ishikawa entered his work into the 2nd Game/Hobby Program Contest, which was held by Enix to publish quality computer games from promising, new designers. He initially called it Assault V and was unable to use the title Starship Troopers (宇宙の戦士) because it has been used by another contest entry from the previous year. Kagirinaki Tatakai was chosen because of its similarity to the title of Joe Haldeman's The Forever War, another science fiction novel that features powered suits. Kagirinaki Tatakai was one of ten contestants that received Enix's third-place Selected Program Award and the game was released in October 1983 alongside all the other winners for that year.

The game sold only around 3,000 units on the X1. Enix subsequently requested that Ishikawa create a port of the game for the more popular NEC PC-8801, but Ishikawa found it impossible for him to effectively scroll the sprites around the screen on that computer, something he had easily achieved on the X1 with the aid of the Programmable Character Generator (PCG). The company was ultimately displeased with what he presented so the conversion's release was cancelled and Ishikawa went unpaid for his effort. His next project, Brain Breaker, began development in April 1984 and would be published on the X1 by Enix the following year. Ishikawa exited the gaming industry shortly thereafter to became a college professor of natural science.

== Reception and legacy ==
The Japanese computer magazine Login briefly described Kagirinaki Tatakai as having a fantastic concept and screen layout. Hiroyuki Urakawa of another Japanese publication, Oh!X, declared that despite it not being fast-paced, there was no other action like Kagirinaki Tatakai and that its eerie background music was still stuck in his head years later. Writing for both Retro Gamer and Hardcore Gaming 101, John Szczepaniak described the game as a "forgotten gem", noting its non-mirrored player sprite, three distinct weapons, variety of enemies, and realistic physics while considering its destructible environments as innovative for the time. Szczepaniak had minor criticisms towards the music, controls, and lack of visual smoothness, but felt he could not be too harsh considering its hardware limitations and the context in which the game was made.

Kagirinaki Tatakai is largely obscure but gained some attention on internet forums in 2008 after the posting of a translated interview with Treasure designer Mitsuru Yaida. He mentioned a Sharp X1 title, redacted from the interview, as an influence on the development of Bangai-O. Online sleuths initially presumed the game in question to be Kagirinaki Tatakai, but it was later revealed to be Hover Attack instead. Designer Derek Yu was influenced by Kagirinaki Tatakai when developing his 2008 platformer Spelunky. Although Yu admitted he had not played the older title, reading about it "stirred his imagination". Kagirinaki Tatakai, alongside the obscure rogue-like NetHack, prompted him to include destructible environments in Spelunky.
