= FM-11 =

Fujitsu business computer

- Manufacturer: Fujitsu
- Type: Personal computer
- Released: 1982
- Lifespan: 1982–85
- Introductory price: 398000 yen (Japan, 1983)
- Operating system: CP/M-86, OS-9, FLEX, MS-DOS (and CP/M-80)
- CPU: Intel 8088 (8 MHz) and MBL 68B09E (2 MHz), optional Intel 8080
- Memory: 128 KB (up to 1 MB)
- Graphics: 640×400, 640×200 with 8 colours
- Sound: Beeper
- Predecessor: FM-8
- Successor: FM-16β

The FM-11 (Fujitsu Micro 11) was a business computer announced by Fujitsu in November 1982. It is a higher-end model of their previous FM-8 computer, and was released simultaneously with the mass-market FM-7 machine.

The FM-11 series was intended to be used in offices and the EX model had a price of 398 000 yen in 1983/4. Japanese characters could be displayed by using a 16×16 pixel font.

The FM-11 range was replaced by the 16-bit FM-16β series by the mid-1980s.

== Models ==
There was a series of different FM-11 models:

- 1982 – FM-11 EX: 6809 & 8088 dual microprocessors.
- 1982 – FM-11 AD: 6809 microprocessor only.
- 1982 – FM-11 ST: economic version of the AD, with a floppy disc drive as an option. Built-in ROM Basic.
- 1984 – FM-11 BS: 8088 microprocessor only.
- 1984 – FM-11 AD2, OS-9 operating system.
- 1985 – FM-11 AD2+: enhanced AD2 with 256 KB of RAM.

== Emulator ==
Multi Emulator Super System for Windows/Linux/Mac includes an FM-11 emulator.
