= Clockwork Knight =

1994 video game

- European box art
- Developer: Sega (Team Aquila)
- Publisher: Sega
- Director: Tomoyuki Ito
- Producers: Noriyoshi Oba; Yoji Ishii; Makoto Oshitani
- Composer: Hirofumi Murasaki
- Platform: Sega Saturn
- Release: JP: December 9, 1994; NA: May 11, 1995; EU: July 8, 1995; Pepperouchau no Fukubukuro: JP: December 15, 1995; NA: February 17, 1996
- Genre: Platform
- Mode: Single-player

Clockwork Knight (Note: Known in Japan as Clockwork Knight: Pepperouchau's Adventure – First Volume (クロックワーク ナイト ～ ペパルーチョの大冒険・上巻～)) is a 1994 platform game developed and published by Sega for the Sega Saturn. It was released in Japan on December 9, 1994, and as a launch title in North America and Europe, on May 11 and July 8, 1995, respectively. It was followed by Clockwork Knight 2.

On December 15, 1995, Clockwork Knight: Pepperouchau no Fukubukuro, a compilation featuring both Clockwork Knight titles and additional content was released in Japan. This version was used as the basis for the American release of Clockwork Knight 2, which was released on February 17, 1996, although with the first game locked behind a cheat code. Reviews were mixed, with critics praising the advanced graphics but criticizing the low difficulty, short length, and lack of gameplay innovation.

== Gameplay ==
This game is a side-scrolling platformer in the vein of the Mario and Sonic the Hedgehog series. Unlike those games, however, the game uses prerendered digitized 2D sprites of high-resolution 3D models similar to the Donkey Kong Country series, or Killer Instinct, on top of fully 3D levels (and with fully 3D bosses).

Pepper attacks enemies and opens passages with his key. A quick tap of a button will thrust it out horizontally. Likewise, repeatedly tapping the button over and over will cause him to twist the key around and around. This makes it a bit more powerful (e.g.: an enemy could be knocked out temporarily with a simple jab, but running into the key when twisting it will instantly take it out). He can also pick up unconscious enemies or objects such as footballs or springs and toss them; vertical tosses are possible. The levels also incorporate environmental puzzles involving household objects, such as moving and stacking wooden blocks to reach higher areas or inserting a battery into a toy train to activate it.

The goal is to reach the end of the stage before time or hit points (typically three, though Gold Keys can increase that maximum) run out. There are no checkpoints; dying sends a player back to the beginning of a level. The levels are fairly large and contain numerous side areas with treasures. Every third level, Pepper must face off against a large, fully polygonal boss in a one-on-one battle. The game has 13 levels, including boss levels. The levels take place in four different rooms (Betsy's Room, Kevin's Room, the Kitchen, and the Attic) with two normal levels and one boss each, plus a final boss. After beating the bosses of the first three worlds, the player can opt to participate in a bonus game called Soltian Roulette, ran by Soltia the perfume bottle in which Imperial Crowns (silver coins found commonly throughout the game) are spent for a chance at gaining extra lives in a shell game. If Pepper loses all his lives, the player can continue from the beginning of the current room by spending Crowns. If the player does not have enough coins to continue, the game is over and the player must start from the beginning of the game.

== Plot ==
Sir Tongara de Pepperouchau III ("Pepper" for short) is a toy soldier. He is in love with the Clockwork Fairy Princess, Chelsea, whose voice wakes up the toys of the house every night at midnight. But he is clumsy and something of a laughing stock, especially when compared to his friendly rival Ginger who is also after Chelsea's heart.

One night Chelsea is stolen away by an unknown force, which also hypnotizes some of the lesser toys to become fierce minions and stand in the way of anyone who would try to rescue her. If there is no voice to wake them up anymore then the toys will never live again, so Pepper and Ginger head off to find Chelsea before it is too late.

== Development ==
According to producer Noriyoshi Oba, Clockwork Knight took over a year to create. Before deciding on a world of toys, the development team thought of utilizing a much darker and serious swords and sorcery theme, but after many revisions it was dropped due to it being deemed unsatisfactory. After the switch to the fantasy toy setting, development sped up considerably. Designer Katsuhisa "Kats" Sato cited Mickey Mania as an influence on Clockwork Knight. The game's full motion video sequences were designed by freelance artist Masayuki Hasegawa.

The game was an early example of a 2.5D platformer, combining traditional side-scrolling gameplay with pre-rendered character sprites and three-dimensional polygonal environments and obstacles. Contemporary coverage highlighted the game's three-dimensional parallax scrolling, which used sprites mapped onto geometric surfaces to create the impression of depth. Background objects appeared to change perspective as the player moved across the screen, while some environmental objects could also be manipulated during gameplay. Designer Kats Sato explained that the Sega Saturn's limitations in rendering large numbers of polygons influenced his decision to retain a side-scrolling format, while Prince of Persia inspired the use of environmental traps.

Sega made several modifications to make the game more difficult for its North American and European releases, such as increasing the number of hits required to defeat the bosses, as well as increasing the number of Imperial Crowns needed to play the Soltian Roulette bonus game. Producer Dante Anderson explained, "For some reason, Japanese audiences like to beat their games very quickly, but Americans want more challenge, and Europeans like the games tougher still."

In Brazil, Sega distributor TecToy included Clockwork Knight in its Feras do Sega Club high-score competition. The January–February 1996 issue of Sega Club published a record of 14,065,750 points achieved by Rogério Dias and invited players to submit photographic evidence of their scores by 29 March 1996.

== Reception ==
Reception

Review scores
Publication	Score
Edge	6 / 10
Electronic Gaming Monthly	28 / 40
Famitsu	10 / 10; 32 / 40
GameFan	250 / 300
Next Generation	3/5
Consoles +	92%
Joypad	95%
Maximum	2/5
Mean Machines Sega	82%
Player One	87%
Sega Pro	91%
Sega Saturn Tsūshin	29 / 40

Award
Publication	Award
GameFan	Import Game of the Year

On release, Sega Saturn Tsūshin awarded the game a 29 out of 40. Famicom Tsūshin followed this up with a score of 32 out of 40 eight months later, giving it a 10 out of 10 in their Reader Cross Review.

USA-based magazine GamePro reviewed the Japanese version of the game prior to the Saturn's launch in the USA. They highly praised the responsive controls and graphical effects such as the scaling of enemies when they move to and from the background, but criticized the game for lack of gameplay innovation, concluding that it is "excellent-looking" and "enjoyable to play" but "once the initial look of the game wears off, you're left with a game you've been playing for years." Their later review of the North American release was more forgiving. Though they criticized the music, controls, and low difficulty, they acknowledged that the game was a strong showcase of the Saturn's graphical features and concluded that younger gamers might enjoy it. Next Generation also reviewed the game prior to the Saturn's USA launch. They too were highly impressed with the game's graphics, noting particularly the "solidity" and depth of the objects, the exceptional parallax scrolling effects, and the textures of the scenery. However, they also concurred that the gameplay is "routine" and unoriginal platforming, and found the game too easy as well.

The four reviewers of Electronic Gaming Monthly agreed that the game was a showcase for the Saturn's graphical abilities but considered this to be a negative, with one of them elaborating that "The 3-D perspective is practically shoved down your throat. There are enough colors to blind you for life..." Two of them felt the graphics were particularly wasted because the player character cannot enter the different scrolling planes. They rated it an overall "good game" and scored it 28 out of 40 (7 out of 10 average). Similarly to GamePro and Next Generation, Maximum commented that "The graphics do look great ... and the gameplay is decent enough, but playing the game is in no way a new experience. Everything you can do in Clockwork Knight, you've probably done before in a 16-bit title." However, they felt the game's worst point to be its lack of longevity, asserting that "even the most unskilled player will have seen all four levels in one session."

In Japan, Clockwork Knight sold an estimated 157,775 copies by November 1997, ranking 54th among Sega Saturn games. In the United States, Sega's internal sales records indicate that approximately 36,000 retail copies were sold during 1995.

== Legacy ==
According to Traveller's Tales co-founder Jon Burton, Clockwork Knight influenced the development of the studio's 1995 video game adaptation of Toy Story.

Clockwork Knight also influenced the development of the original Grand Theft Auto. DMA Design programmer Mike Dailly was impressed by the game's use of three-dimensional perspective within a side-scrolling platform game and experimented with recreating the effect on PC. Dailly subsequently realized that the side-on perspective engine could be adapted into an overhead view by adding a floor, producing a prototype that was used as the basis for Race 'n' Chase, the project that became Grand Theft Auto.

A sequel game, Clockwork Knight 2, was released on the Sega Saturn in 1995. To date, the franchise has not received any further entries. A puzzle video game spinoff was announced later in the 1990s, and a continuation of the series for the GameCube called Knight N' Knight was announced in 2003, but neither ever materialized.
