= Lolita Syndrome =

Japanese video game

In-game screenshot of the FM-7 version.

Lolita Syndrome (ロリータ・シンドローム) (Japanese: ロリータ・シンドローム, Hepburn: Rorīta Shindorōmu) is a Japanese adult computer game created by Katsumi Mochizuki and distributed by Enix. It was the winner of Enix's second bi-annual Game Hobby Program Contest. The game was released for the FM-7 and PC-8801 platforms on 31 October 1983.

== Plot ==
The game takes place within a house called "Maison Lolita" where under-aged cartoon girls run around without clothes, and play games which involve cheating death. The player must solve puzzles in order to save the cartoon girls from violent deaths, or to see the girls without their clothes on. The game was not originally advertised as containing gore, and this element was only hinted at on the game's packaging:

Japanese text	English translation
ここはかわいい少女達が住む「メゾンロリータ」僕は胸をときめかして訪問。少女のかがれなき瞳、独持の体形、なめらかな肌。そ〜です僕はロリコン。1号室から展開する思いがけない体験。僕の体に戦慄が走った。	This is "Maison Lolita" where cute girls live. I visited, my heart pounding. A girl's gentle gaze, unique body shape, and smooth skin...thaaat's right, I'm a lolicon. An unexpected experience unfolds in Room 1. Horror runs through my body...

== Gameplay ==
The game opens showing five doors at "Maison Lolita". The player selects one of these five rooms to enter, with each containing a different minigame.

=== Buzz saw room ===
A girl is strapped to a table, and a circular buzz saw is slowly moving towards her. The player must choose the correct key from ten keys in order to release the girl, and is limited to five guesses. After five incorrect guesses, the buzz saw slices the girl who explodes into a fountain of gore and dies; if the player is successful in freeing the girl, they take off her clothes.

=== Human dart board room ===
A girl is strapped to a dartboard, and the player is to toss darts at her. The player selects a series of darts which are randomly allocated by number; success is determined randomly by the computer depending on which number the player selects. If the player wins, the girl's clothing is removed; otherwise, the girl explodes into gore and dies.

=== Password room ===
A sleeping girl is lying on a bed, and the player must type a Japanese word in order to wake her up and have her take her clothes off. The game provides hints to the player.

=== Rock Paper Scissors room ===
The player plays a game of rock paper scissors against a girl, who removes a piece of her clothing each time the player wins.

=== Gallery room ===
The final room does not contain a game, but rather a gallery where the player can view pornographic images of underage cartoon girls.

== Development ==
Prior to creating its well-known series of role-playing games which include Dragon Quest and Star Ocean, Enix was a niche game publisher which became involved in the creation and distribution of pornographic games during the 1980s. Lolita Syndrome was the winning game of the second Game Hobby Program Contest sponsored by Enix. A similar game was released by Enix in February 1983, Mari-chan's Close Call (マリちゃん危機一髪), which also involves gore and pornographic imagery of underage girls. The game revolves around the player protecting a teenage girl named Mariko Hashimoto from kidnappers and killers who throw knives at her, attach her to high-voltage batteries, or place her next to bombs.

Lolita Syndrome was programmed and illustrated by manga artist Katsumi Mochizuki. During the game's development, Mochizuki was simultaneously an illustrator for the children's educational series Learning Manga (学習まんが) published by Shogakukan.

== Reception ==
Lolita Syndrome developed a cult following with Japanese otaku and game collectors during the time of its original release. The game was produced during the "Lolicon Boom" within the Japanese anime and manga industries, and its content reflects the stylistic choices of the era. In 1985, Mochizuki developed a sequel called My Lolita (マイ・ロリータ) which was released by Koei. My Lolita contained tamer, less violent content but did not sell as well as its predecessor.

In recent decades, Lolita Syndrome has been scrutinized for its extreme content. In 2011, American comedy magazine Cracked.com published the article "6 Famous Artists You Didn't Know Were Perverts" by Maxwell Yezpitelok, in which Lolita Syndrome was specifically mentioned as an example of Enix's history of producing adult games. Yezpitelok derided the game for its content involving "sexually suggestive toddlers", calling it "contrived" and "sadistic". Author Kiyoshi Tane has speculated that Enix was able to release physical copies of Lolita Syndrome due to a mainstream belief at the time that video games were mainly for adults. He concludes by calling the game "the most problematic work" released by Enix.
