= Clockwork Knight 2 =

1995 video game

- North American Saturn cover art
- Developer: Sega (Team Aquila)
- Publisher: Sega
- Director: Tomoyuki Ito
- Producers: Noriyoshi Oba; Yoji Ishii; Makoto Oshitani
- Composer: Hirofumi Murasaki
- Platform: Sega Saturn
- Release: JP: July 28, 1995; EU: October 27, 1995
- Genre: Platform
- Mode: Single-player

Clockwork Knight 2 (Note: Known in Japan as Clockwork Knight: Pepperouchau's Adventure - Second Volume (クロックワーク ナイト ～ ペパルーチョの大冒険・下巻～)) is a side-scrolling platform video game developed and published by Sega for the Sega Saturn. It was released in Japan on July 28, 1995 and on October 27th of the same year in Europe. The game is a direct sequel to Clockwork Knight, featuring many of the same mechanics as its predecessor.

On December 15, 1995, Clockwork Knight: Pepperouchau no Fukubukuro, a compilation featuring both Clockwork Knight titles and additional content was released in Japan. This version was used as the basis for the American release of the game, which was released on February 17, 1996, although with the first game inaccessible. Many critics deemed the sequel a dramatic improvement over its predecessor, citing improved replay value and pacing.

== Plot ==
Clockwork Knight 2 immediately picks up on the cliffhanger left by Clockwork Knight. Chelsea is safe and sound, but will not wake up. As the toys not under the spell ponder just what to do, Chelsea is suddenly kidnapped again. Thus, Pepper again sets out to rescue her.

== Gameplay ==
Clockwork Knight 2 uses identical gameplay to that of its predecessor, right down to using all the same items and having four rooms with two levels each, plus a final boss. The four main areas are the Kid's Room, Study Room, Bath Room and Clock Tower, each featuring different household environments and obstacles.

The game introduces several gameplay additions, including collectible playing cards, automatically scrolling stages and hidden racing challenges. Four playing cards are concealed within each main level, with players receiving a gold key for collecting all four. Finding all 32 cards throughout the game rewards players with a level-selection code. In certain stages, Pepper rides his donkey Barobaro, whose detachable head can be launched at enemies. The game also features hidden obstacle races against Le Bon and Prunchau, which offer additional rewards.

The North American release was based on the Japanese compilation Clockwork Knight: Pepperouchau no Fukubukuro, which contained both games. It includes a mode called "Bosses Galore", in which players can control either Pepper or his rival Ginger while fighting bosses from both Clockwork Knight games. Completing this mode earns a performance-based ranking, with a rank of Expert or higher unlocking additional bonus content.

== Development and promotion ==
Clockwork Knight 2 originated as the second half of a project initially conceived as a single game. Designer Kats Sato later explained that Sega divided the project into two separate releases so that the first instalment could be made available shortly after the Sega Saturn's launch.

During the game's pre-release promotion, the Japanese Sega Saturn Magazine invited readers to submit ideas for traps and stage gimmicks, although it cautioned that submissions were not guaranteed to be incorporated into the finished game.

== Reception ==
Reception

Review scores
Publication	Score
Electronic Gaming Monthly	9/10, 8.5/10, 9/10, 8.5/10
Famitsu	8/10, 8/10, 8/10, 8/10
Next Generation	3/5
Maximum	4/5
Sega Saturn Magazine	88%
CD Player	7/10

Clockwork Knight 2 was well received by reviewers. Maximum assessed that the game is just as short as the original Clockwork Knight, but has much greater replay value, particularly the hidden playing cards. They also hailed the graphics as "far in advance of any other comparable next generation product". Next Generation's brief review noted that Clockwork Knight 2 made little change to the formula of the original game, and concluded by simply stating, "If you like CK you are sure to like CK2." The four reviewers of Electronic Gaming Monthly described it as a must-have game for the Saturn. They especially praised the innovative use of both foreground and background playing areas, the impressive graphics, and the numerous secrets. GamePro praised the game for having "some of the best visuals on the Saturn yet" and "excellent jazzy tunes that perfectly complement the action", but felt these did not make up for the routine and overly easy gameplay, saying it "takes the life out of the game."

European reviews were generally positive. Tom Guise of British magazine Sega Saturn Magazine, while criticizing the game's short length, praised the pacing of the gameplay, the impressiveness of the 3D graphics, and the large number of hidden areas and secrets, and summarized that "Clockwork Knight 2 manages to succeed, in every respect, where the original game failed." French magazine Consoles + awarded the game 90%, praising its three-dimensional presentation, animation, hidden passages and puzzles, although it criticised the short playing time. German magazine MAN!AC awarded 83%, highlighting the varied environments and additional gameplay features. Italy's Console Mania gave the game 89%, particularly praising its graphics and sound, which received individual scores of 96 and 93 respectively. Spanish magazine Hobby Consolas awarded 88%, commending its visual depth effects, varied levels and hidden areas.

In Japan, Sega Saturn Magazine awarded Clockwork Knight 2 individual reviewer scores of 6, 5 and 7 out of 10. The reviewers offered mixed assessments of its visual presentation and gameplay additions, with one critic arguing that the sequel remained too similar to its predecessor and retained some of the original game's frustrating elements. In the final Sega Saturn Magazine reader rankings, subsequently compiled in the 2000 book Saturn no Game wa Sekai Ichi!, the game ranked 510th among 945 rated Saturn titles, receiving an average reader score of 7.5294 out of 10.

== Future ==
A spin-off with the working title of Clockwork Knight: Pengin War / Clockwork Knight Puzzle was announced in the mid-90s, but never saw an official release.

A reboot titled Knight N' Knight was announced in 2003 for the GameCube, but was never released.
