= Floating Runner: Quest for the 7 Crystals =

1996 platforming video game

- Publishers: JP: Xing Entertainment; NA/EU: THQ
- Platform: PlayStation
- Release: JP: January 19, 1996; USA: October 1996; UK: December 1996
- Genre: Platformer
- Mode: Single-player

Floating Runner: Quest for the 7 Crystals (Note: Japanese: フローティングランナー 7つの水晶の物語, Hepburn: Furōtingu Ran'nā: Nanatsu no Suishō no Monogatari) is a 3D platform game published in Japan by Xing Entertainment and in the United States by THQ for the PlayStation. The game is set in Crystal Land where Zaurer and his enemy forces invade to taint the seven crystals of the land. This leads to Cress and Lay to step forward to collect the crystals and battle Zaurer.

The game involves the player controlling either Cress or Lay who can either hop on or shoot enemies with projectiles as they navigate a 3D environment to try and find the crystal. Various power-ups can be found to enhance their health or weaponry as they proceed through the games levels.

On its release in January 1996, it was one of the few platform games available for the PlayStation. Some early reviews from Playstation Plus and GameFan complimented a unique style of a platform game in 3D, other publications such as Weekly Famitsu, Next Generation and PSX-Pro found it inferior to other contemporary games in the genre such as Jumping Flash! (1995) or Super Mario 64 (1996).

== Plot ==
Floating Runner: Quest for the 7 Crystals takes place in Crystal Land, a kingdom with six different worlds that is maintained and protected by the mystical powers of six crystals. A force from a neighboring kingdom known as Zaurer invades with an army of Dark Guards. The leads to the creation of a seventh crystal and the six crystals becoming tainted with evil. As these worlds nearly lay in ruin, an old priest came forward and requested the citizens to gather the crystals and purify them in the Fountain of Light to save Crystal Land. This leads to the priest's young apprentice Cress and a young bounty hunter named Lay volunteering to save the land.

The game begins in a level called Crystal Park. Following this world, they are sent to various themed worlds ("Fire World", "Forest World", "Sky World", etc.). After six crystals are collected, they are sent to Zaurer's lair in the Dark World to obtain the Crystal of Darkness.

== Gameplay ==
Floating Runner: Quest for the 7 Crystals takes place in a 3D environment. In this scene, the health bar, the character Lay and the navigational arrows can be seen.

Floating Runner: Quest for the 7 Crystals is 3D platform game. The game allows players to control one of two characters:Lay, the male of the pair, or the blonde-haired Cress. The player can control the characters by having them jump and control the direction they move on screen. Lay and Cress can also perform a somersault from side to side. They are also equipped with spheres which Lay and Cress can use to throw at enemies or use to open chests around the environment.

Lay and Cress can defeat enemies by shooting or stomping on them. When enemies are defeated, they can release some gems which can be collected. These are used to power their special item weapons. Power-ups range from having the player's spheres home-in on enemies to turning the projectiles into boomerangs. Lay and Cress can find items throughout the game, such as health potions and power-ups for their weapons. Hearts can be found to extend the life bar while potions re-fill the health bar.

Lay and Cress have a health bar represented by the hearts at the top of the screen. Being hit by enemies reduces the health bar. Each character must reach the end of a stage, which is indicated by in-game directional arrows, before an in-game timer reaches zero.

== Development and release ==
Gaming publications have given various sources who developed Floating Runner, such as Xing Entertainment or Kokopeli Digital Studios. In an interview with Tokihiro Naito who worked for T&E Soft, he said that Floating Runner may have been developed by the Osaka-based development team of the company. Xing Entertainment published Floating Runner in Japan. Xing Entertainment was established in March 1995 to develop, sell, and publish game software for the PlayStation in Japan, United States and PAL territories. D4 Enterprise purchased the rights to titles from T&E Soft in 2019, which included the rights to Floating Runner. The game was released in Japan for the PlayStation on January 19, 1996. At the time of release, platforming games on the PlayStation were rare. The game was among the three 3D platformer games to be released for the console in 1996, along with Crash Bandicoot and Bubsy 3D.

By June 1996, THQ had announced to release Floating Runner both domestically and internationally in the second-half of the year. The company presented the game at E3 between May 16-18, 1996 along with other Japanese games such as Robo Pit (1996) and K-1 The Arena Fighters (1996). Electronic Gaming Monthly said that only the first level in the game featured polygons with Gouraud shading, and that publisher THQ asked the programmers to apply this to the rest of the game for its release in the United States. It was released in October 1996 in the United States and December 1996 in the United Kingdom. THQ announced that their fourth-quarter revenue for 1996 increased 43% over the year. The company attributed this to the increase of the numbers of games they published with 31 games published in 1996 and 10 of them being published in the fourth quarter of the year.

== Reception ==
Reception

Review scores
Publication	Score
Allgame	2/5
Dengeki PlayStation	55/100, 40/100
Famitsu	5/10, 6/10, 6/10, 4/10
GameFan	90/100, 93/100, 88/100; 70/100, 65/100, 72/100
Game Informer	3/10
Intelligent Gamer	C-
Mean Machines PlayStation	74/100
Mega Fun	66%
Next Generation	2/5
PlayStation Magazine	6/10
Playstation Plus	81/100
PSX-Pro	4.5/10

On its release, English-language reviews ranged from Electronic Gaming Monthly (EGM) calling it a worthy addition to the PlayStation library and Playstation Plus saying it was a promising platform game "destined for unwarranted obscurity." to a PSX-Pro reviewer describing it as "the worst PSX game I've played to date" While initially giving it very high scores when reviewing it a Japanese import title, the game received lower scores in GameFan months later as they felt the game was lacking compared to other platform games and PlayStation titles.

Reviewers Playstation Plus and GameFan complimented the gameplay, with the former magazine's reviewers calling it a totally unique experience. A review in Mega Fun found the 3D movement initially impressive, while "monotony gradually creeps in due to a lack of variety, there are no surprises, no funny ideas or other features that contribute to a long-term commitment to the game. One reviewer in Dengeki PlayStation and two from Famitsu found it too easy to get lost in the 3D environment, while Next Generation said that "the world is far less open to exploration than it should be". EGM complimented the large-scaled levels, which Next Generation echoed saying the "level layouts are actually well thought-out" and "could be entertaining if the camera view didn't constantly make traversing them a chore." A number of reviews critiqued the narrow field of view and the lack of variety between the two camera options.

Intelligent Gamer wrote that the games soundtrack was "one of the game's few highlights" comparing it to the "soothing and surreal soundtrack" of Jumping Flash! (1995). Game on! USA, GameFan and AllGame also complimented the soundtrack, while the latter publication added that it "could be easily replicated on a Nintendo Game Boy Color." Reviewers in Famitsu and Intelligent Gamer reviewer added that a lack of sound effects in the game made it so it wasn't obvious when the player was taking damage.

PlayStation Magazine said the graphics of the landscapes in the game were "charmingly simple" while also being "ugly and hollow". A Mega Fun review described the as "rough" which made the levels cold and sterile looking. AllGame claimed the anime-styled characters and cute monsters "will be a positive to some gamers but annoying to others." Dengeki PlayStation complimented the cute character designs, with a Famitsu reviewer saying that it was if they tried to stuff the screen with as many cute polygonal monsters as they could. Player One found the tone of the game too saccharine for them, while the PSX-Pro reviewer said their dislike for manga "maybe clouding my judgement a little" but finding the design to be rubbish.

A number of reviewers found the game inferior to similar games released around the time such as Jumping Flash! or Super Mario 64 (1996). A review in Intelligent Gamer wrote that "True platform fans will appreciate Floating Runner for its original take on the idea of 3-D but for most everyone else, it should only be noticed as an experiment in platformers gone wrong." PlayStation Magazine summarized that it was "best left for Nintendo addicts who love their PlayStation but miss their Super Nintendo. If such a person exists."

In Game Informer's annual Video Game Awards, Floating Runner was an honorable mention in their "Worst Game of the Year" award, which was won by another THQ published game Time Killers (1996). Academic Mario Michaelides discussed the game in Fifty Key Video Games (2023) saying that it lacked depth and quality.

== See also ==
- List of PlayStation games
