= The Earth Fighter Rayieza =

1987 video game

- Japanese MSX box art
- Developer(s): Enix; Pax Softnica (Family Computer)
- Publisher(s): Enix; Nintendo (Family Computer)
- Producer(s): Yoshihiro Hosaka (Ginga no Sannin)
- Designer(s): Makoto Kuba
- Programmer(s): Makoto Kuba (Rayieza); Yukio Tamura (Ginga no Sannin)
- Artist(s): Shintaro Majima; Go Nagai (Ginga no Sannin characters)
- Writer(s): Yasuo Hasegawa (Rayieza); Makoto Kuba (Ginga no Sannin)
- Composer(s): Y. Sawamura (Rayieza); Yukihiro Takahashi (Ginga no Sannin); Hiroaki Hontani (Ginga no Sannin)
- Platform(s): PC-8801; FM-7; X1; MSX; Famicom
- Release: Enix releases: JP: 1985; Family Computer: JP: December 15, 1987
- Genre(s): Role-playing video game
- Mode(s): Single-player

The Earth Fighter Rayieza (Note: Japanese: 地球戦士ライーザ, Hepburn: Chikyū Senshi Raīza) is a role-playing video game developed and published by Enix. It was originally published in 1985 for the PC-8801, FM-7, X1, and MSX personal computer systems. The game was ported to the Famicom on December 15, 1987 by Nintendo under the title Ginga no Sannin (銀河の三人). The programming was done by Pax Softnica.

The game takes place in a sci-fi setting instead of a fantasy world. The characters from Ginga no Sannin were designed by Go Nagai, who also drew the illustrations for the game's package. The background music from Ginga no Sannin was composed by Yukihiro Takahashi. Takahashi included an arranged version of Yellow Magic Orchestra's "Rydeen" as the battle theme.

== Plot ==
In the year 2300, the human race created an Earth federation government and spread out into space to begin colonizing the surrounding planets. However, an alien species from the far reaches of outer space began attacking the human forces, putting the very survival of the human race at stake. Though it was only a matter of time before Earth fell to the enormous power of the enemy forces, the Earth's army commander issued an order calling all of the units dispersed around the colonized planets to return to Earth. The player takes the role of a young soldier who was stationed with the Rayieza unit on the planet Mars. The journey begins as he makes his way back to Earth along with the other members of his unit.

== Characters ==
Protagonist
The main character was originally stationed in Mars, but lost most of his comrades in the battle against the aliens and makes his way back to Earth with the only other surviving member, Blue. In the PC-8801 version, his default name is Kenshirō (ケンシロウ).
Blue (ブルー, Burū)
Blue is the only other surviving member of the Rayieza force, which was decimated by in a battle against the alien forces. He is an expert user of ESP, and he can sense dead souls remaining in the world. His appearance differs completely in the Family Computer version of the game.
Rimi (リミ)
Rimi is a girl discovered in a cold sleep state in a capsule recovered in the space station (the moon level in the Family Computer version). She decides to assist the Rayieza unit by communicating with them from Earth.
Mio (ミオ)
Mio is the computer program that manages the Rayieza unit's operations.

== Ginga no Sannin (Family Computer version) ==
The Family Computer port of the game was released on December 15, 1987. Though the game is largely a faithful port of the PC version, some arrangements were made, such as the addition of a side-scrolling screen when the player lands on a planet's surface, or Rimi being able to use psychic powers. During the later parts of the game, enemies begin to appear very frequently, and new enemy special attacks were added which can lower the maximum hit-points of allied characters (lowered points return the next time the character's level increases).

Game designer Makoto Kuba stated in an interview that the name was changed due to trademark issues. He also stated that Nintendo may have published the game so that Enix would not have to be associated with a "low-quality" game.

== Soundtrack ==
The theme song for The Earth Fighter Rayieza was included in an album titled "Enix Game Music". It was released by GMO Records on October 25, 1987.
