= FM-8 =

Personal Computer by Fujitsu

Fujitsu FM-8
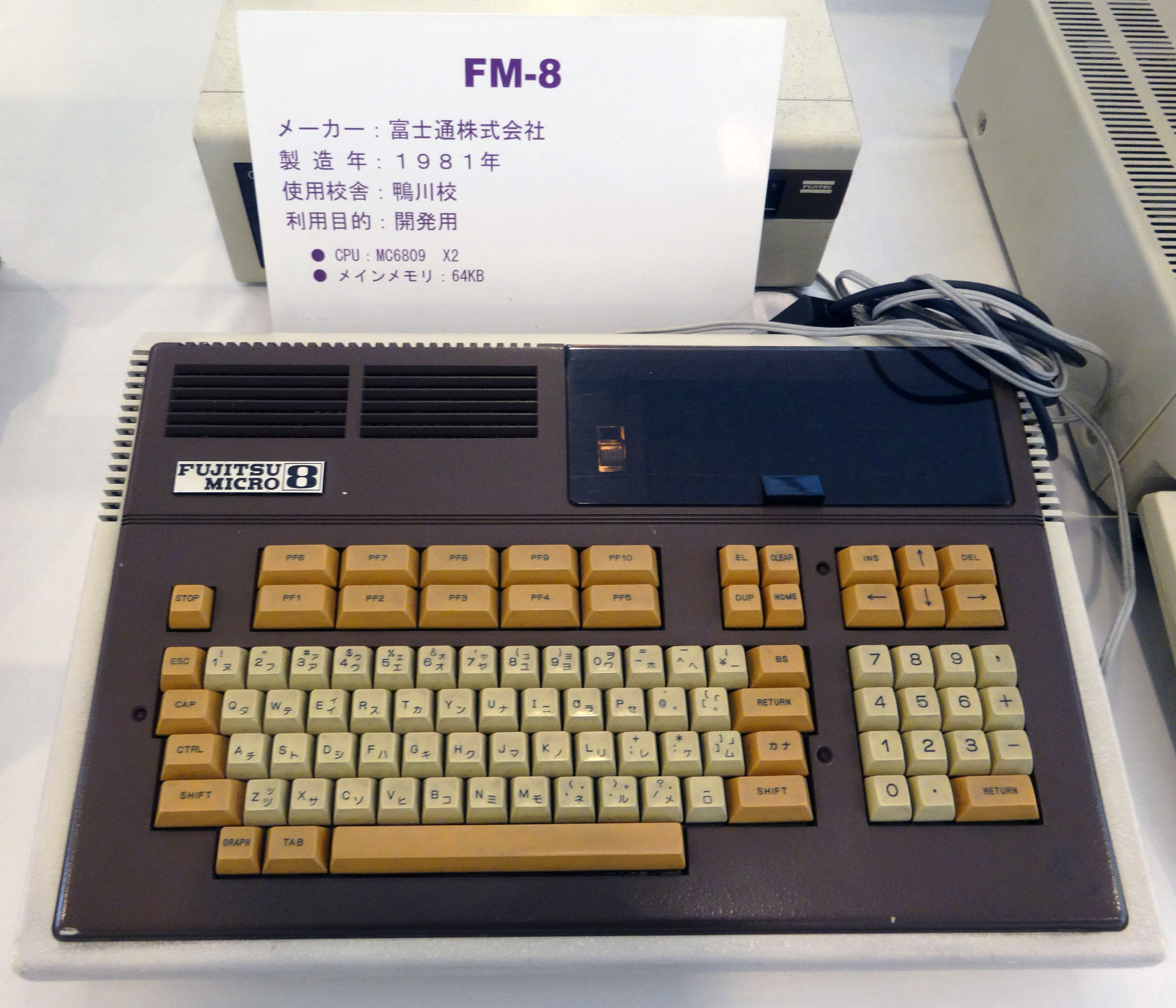
- Manufacturer: Fujitsu; Casio
- Type: Personal Computer
- Released: May 1981; 45 years ago
- Introductory price: ¥218000 (Japan) £895 (UK)
- Discontinued: November 1982; 43 years ago
- Operating system: F-BASIC, UCSD Pascal, FLEX, CP/M (with Z80 card)
- CPU: 68A09 clocked at 1.2 MHz, 6809 co-processor clocked at 1 MHz
- Memory: 64 KB RAM, 48 KB VRAM, 44 KB ROM
- Display: 640 × 200 resolution, 8 colors
- Graphics: 68A09
- Sound: Beeper
- Input: 95-key keyboard
- Dimensions: 490 × 330 × 110 mm (19.3 × 13 × 4.3 inches)
- Weight: 6 kg (13.2 lbs)
- Predecessor: LKIT-8
- Successor: FM-7, FM-11

The FM-8 (Fujitsu Micro 8) is a personal computer developed and manufactured by Fujitsu in May 1981. It was Fujitsu's second microcomputer released to the public after the LKIT-8 kit computer, and the first in the "FM" series. The FM-8 was an early adopter of bubble memory technology. The FM-8 would later be replaced by two new models in November 1982 – the FM-11, aimed at businesses and the FM-7 aimed at the mass market.

== Reception ==
In an evaluation of six Japanese computers, BYTE in 1982 approved of the FM-8's BASIC tutorial and other manuals.

== See also ==
- FM-7
- FM-11
- FM-X
- FM-16β
- FM16π
- FM Towns
- Fujitsu FMV
