= FM-7 =

1982 Fujitsu home computer

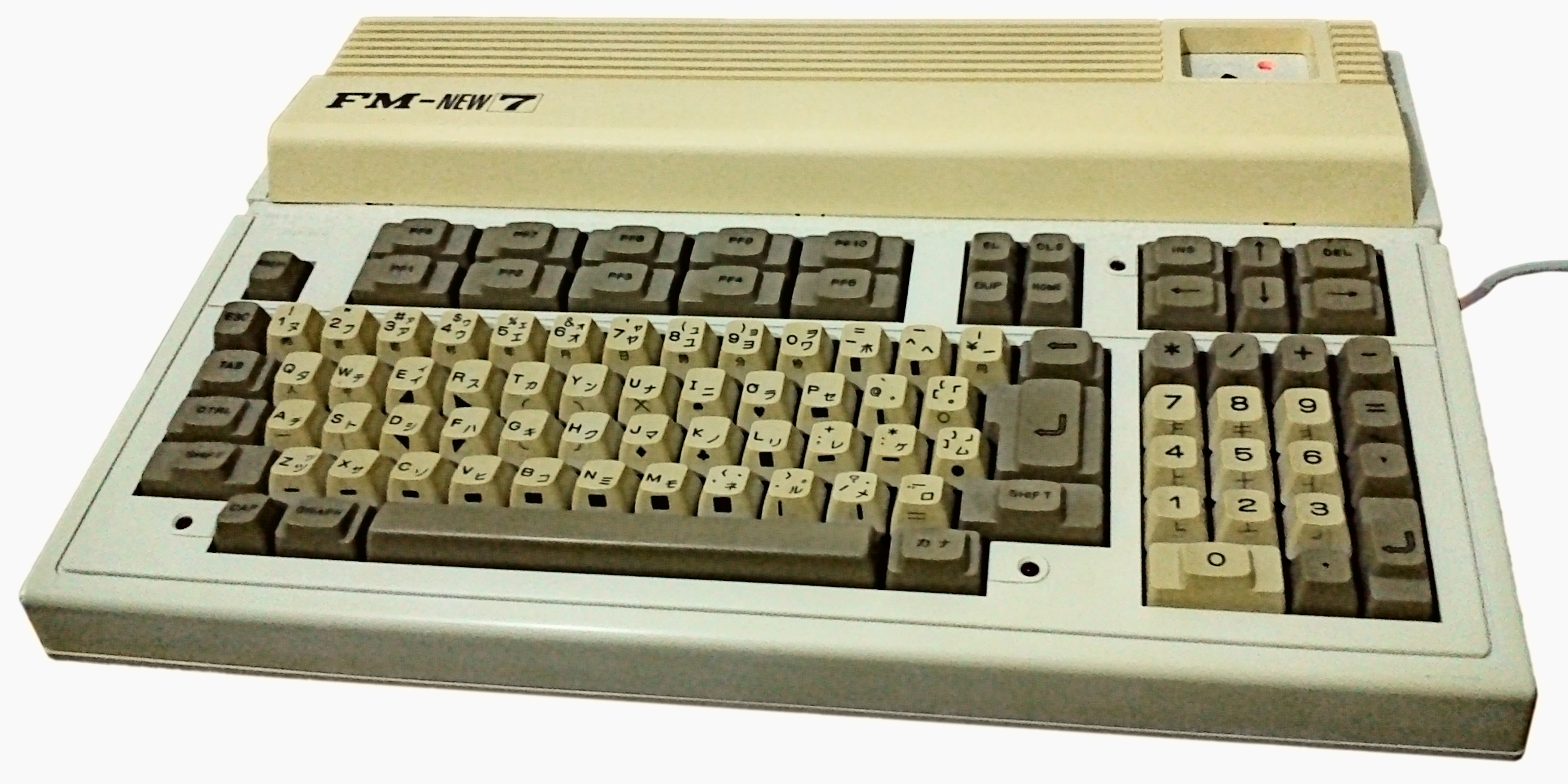
- FM-NEW7
- Manufacturer: Fujitsu
- Type: Personal Computer
- Released: November 1982; 43 years ago
- Introductory price: ¥126,000 ($500)
- Discontinued: April 1984 (original model)
- Units sold: 220,000 (original model)
- Media: Cassette tape, 5 1/4-inch floppy disk
- Operating system: Fujitsu Disk Basic, OS-9, FLEX
- CPU: 2× MBL 68B09 clocked at 2MHz
- Memory: 64KB RAM, 48KB VRAM, 48KB ROM
- Display: 8 colours at 640 × 200 pixel resolution
- Graphics: MBL 68B09
- Sound: AY-3-8910, YM2203 (FM77AV onwards)
- Input: Keyboard, joystick
- Dimensions: 43.2 × 28.5 × 10.2 cm (17 × 11.2 × 4 inches)
- Weight: 4.5 kg (9.9 lbs)
- Predecessor: FM-8
- Successor: FM Towns

The FM-7 ("Fujitsu Micro 7") is a home computer created by Fujitsu. It was first released in 1982 and was sold in Japan and Spain. It is a stripped-down version of Fujitsu's earlier FM-8 computer, and during development it was referred to as the "FM-8 Jr.".

Although it removed some features from the FM-8 such as the bubble memory technology, the FM-7 was given a more advanced AY-3-8910 sound chip, leading to a strong uptake among the hobbyist computer market in Japan and making it a more popular system than the FM-8.

The FM-7 primarily competed with the NEC PC-8801 and Sharp X1 series of computers in the early 1980s. It was succeeded by the FM-77 series of computers in 1984, which featured backward compatibility with the FM-7. The FM-77 series was later succeeded by the 32-bit FM Towns in 1989.

The FM-7 is based around the 6809 chip, which was also used in home computers such as the TRS-80 Color Computer and Dragon 32/64, as well as several arcade games.

== Hardware ==
- Two MC 68B09 CPUs @ 2 MHz: one main CPU and one graphics processor.
- Screen resolution: 640×200, 8 colors
- Memory: 40 KB ROM, 64 KB RAM
- Sound: 3-channel (AY-3-8910) PSG chip, built-in speaker mounted near the top of the unit. From FM77AV onwards, the system includes the 6-channel YM2203 (3 PSG channels + 3 FM channels, making it a total of six).
- Interfaces: RS-232, monitor and Centronics ports, 3 expansion slots.
- Storage: 5.25" floppy disk
- Operating system: OS-9 (compatible with Color Computer)
- Three slots for optional plug-in cards, including a Z80 CPU and additional RS-232 ports.
- Full-size keyboard, with keys handling multiple functions (as many as 5, depending on what SHIFT/KANA/GRAPH/etc key is pressed).
- 10 Function Keys at the top, pre-programmed with shortcuts (LIST, etc.).
- Numeric keypad (on right) and cursor-control keys (upper-right).

== F-BASIC ==
The included "F-BASIC" is an enhanced version of the Color BASIC language used on the TRS-80 Color Computer. Changes include a different character set that includes katakana and a few kanji, the ability to have graphics appear on the default text screen, and several new commands such as BEEP, CONNECT, MON, SYMBOL, INTERVAL, MERGE, RANDOMIZE, SWAP, and TERM. There are also strings for TIME$ and DATE$, which access a temporary built-in internal clock, though if the power is turned off, the time and date are lost.

While F-Basic has commands that Color BASIC does not, most commands featured in both versions of the language operate in exactly the same way.

While the BASIC EDIT command works the same as on Color BASIC, the cursor position is important on the FM-7: there is a small keypad on the upper-right of the FM-7 with cursor-control keys (arrows, INSERT & DELETE), and wherever the user decides to position the cursor, it will move it there and affect whatever is underneath it.

Both Microsoft and Fujitsu share the copyright on the BASIC.

== Spain ==
The FM-7 was sold in Spain as the Secoinsa FM-7. Secoinsa was a electronics supplier to Telefonica, the main Spanish telecom, and was eventually transformed into Fujitsu Spain. It retained an independent R&D department until Fujitsu's 1990 acquisition of ICL. Secoinsa adapted the FM-7 for the Spanish market and specifically for the Spanish government's push towards computers in school, the "Athena Project".

== Models ==
There were several models of the computer:

- 1982 – FM-7: M68B09, RAM 64 KB, ROM 48 KB, VRAM 48 KB, 640×200, 8 colors
- 1984 – FM-NEW7: M68B09 integrated memory and LSI chip (cheap production). The features are the same as the FM-7.
- 1984 – FM77: M68B09E, RAM 64 KB (max 256 KB), VRAM 48 KB
- 1985 – FM77L2, M68B09E
- 1985 – FM77L4, M68B09E
- 1985 – FM77AV: M68B09E, RAM 128 KB (max 192 KB), ROM 48 KB, VRAM 96 KB, 640×200 (8 colors), 320×200 (4096 colors), 4096 colors, 1 (AV-1) or 2 (AV-2) floppy 3.5-inch 320 KB
- 1986 – FM77AV20: M68B09E, like FM77AV but has floppy 640 KB
- 1986 – FM77AV40: M68B09E, like FM77AV20 but has RAM 192 KB (max 448 KB), VRAM 144 KB to support 320×200 (262144 colors)
- 1987 – FM77AV20EX: M68B09E, RAM 128 KB (max 192 KB), VRAM 96 KB, 640×400
- 1987 – FM77AV40EX: M68B09E, RAM 192 KB (max 448 KB), VRAM 144 KB, 640×400
- 1988 – FM77AV40SX: M68B09E, RAM 192 KB (max 448 KB), VRAM 144 KB, 640×400, built-in video digitizer
