= Sharp X1 =

Series of home computers

X1 (CZ-800C)

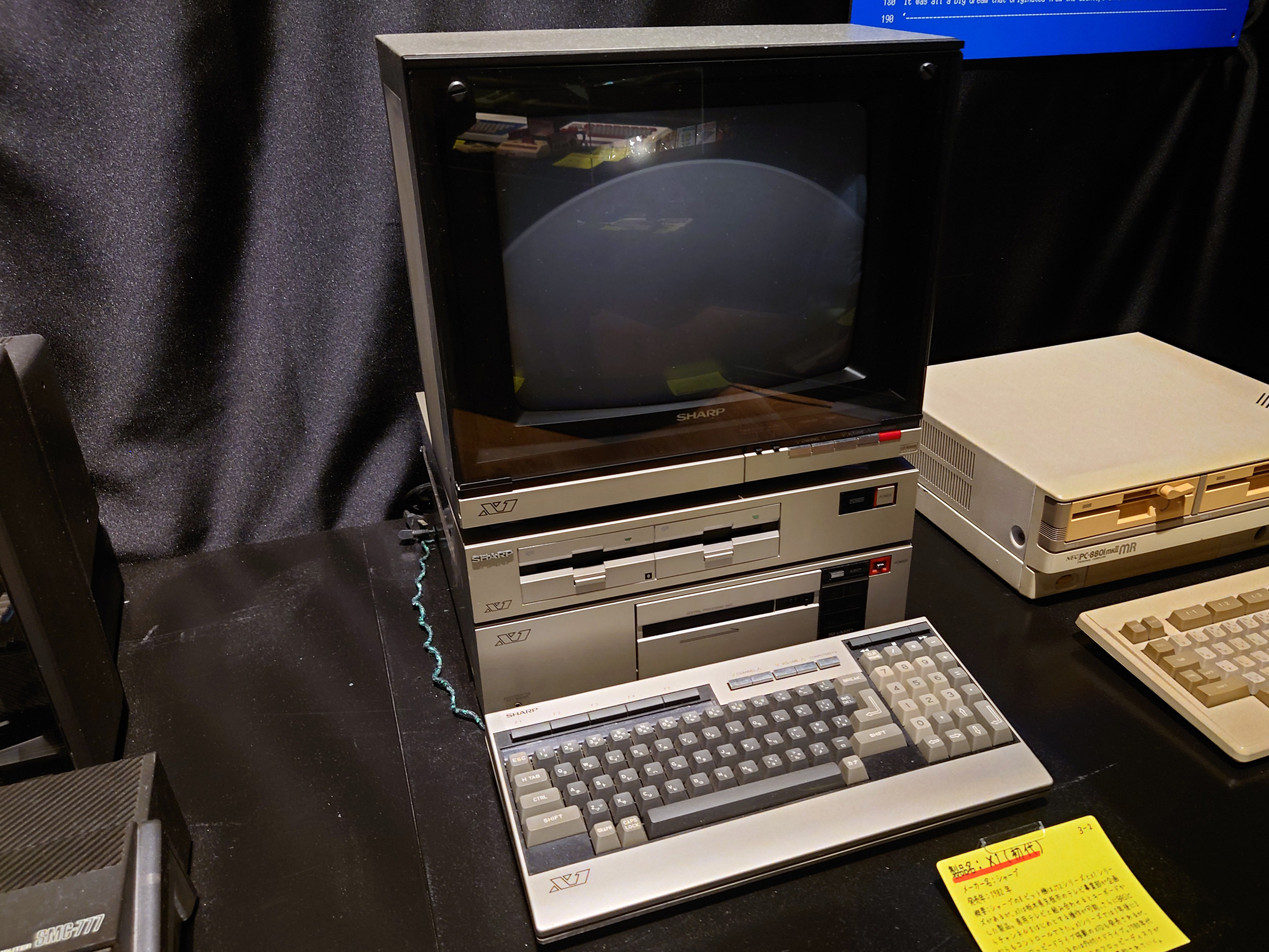
- Manufacturer: Sharp Corporation
- Type: Home computer
- Released: 1982
- Introductory price: ¥155,000
- Discontinued: 1987
- Media: Compact Cassette or floppy disk
- Operating system: Hu-BASIC, CP/M
- CPU: Sharp Z80 A @ 4 MHz
- Memory: 6 KB ROM, 64 KB RAM, 4–48 KB Video RAM
- Removable storage: Cassette tape, floppy disc
- Display: Text: 40 or 80 × 25 characters; Graphics: 320 or 640 × 200; 8 colors
- Sound: AY-3-8910 or Yamaha YM2149 (YM2151 in later revisions)
- Input: Keyboard, joysticks
- Controller input: 2 joysticks
- Connectivity: Printer port, joystick port, audio out
- Power: Built in PSU
- Predecessor: Sharp MZ series
- Successor: X68000

The X1 (エックスワン, Ekkusuwan), sometimes called the Sharp X1 or CZ-800C, is a series of home computers released by Sharp Corporation from 1982 to 1987. It is based on a Zilog Z80 CPU.

The RGB display monitor for the X1 had a television tuner, and a computer screen could be superimposed on TV. All the TV functions could be controlled from a computer program. The character font was completely programmable (PCG) with 4-bit color, and was effectively used in many games. The entirety of the VRAM memory was mapped on to the I/O area, so it was controlled without bank switching. These features made the X1 very powerful for game software.

== Development ==
Despite the fact that the Computer Division of Sharp Corporation had released the MZ series, suddenly the Television Division released a new computer series called the X1. At the time the original X1 was released, all other home computers generally had a BASIC language in ROM. However the X1 did not have a BASIC ROM, and it had to load the Hu-BASIC interpreter from a cassette tape. On the plus side however, this concept meant that a free RAM area was available that was as big as possible when not using BASIC. This policy was originally copied from the Sharp MZ series, and they were called clean computers in Japan. The cabinet shape of X1 was also much more stylish than others at that time and a range of cabinet colors (including Red) was selectable.

Sharp never released an MSX computer in Japan. Some X1 developers were proud to develop their own technology, and they didn't want to work with Microsoft who attempted to create a unified standard. However, the Brazilian subsidiary of Sharp, Epcom, released an MSX computer named Hotbit HB-8000 in Brazil.

== History ==
While X1 was struggling to sell, the NEC PC-8801 was quickly becoming popular in the Japanese market. In 1984, Sharp released the X1 turbo series with high-resolution graphics (640x400, while X1 had 640x200). It had many improvements, but the clock speed was still only 4 MHz. In 1986, Sharp released the X1 turbo Z series with a 4096 color analog RGB monitor. An X1 twin, which had a PC Engine in the cabinet, was released as the last machine of the X1 series in 1987. The X1 series was succeeded by the X68000.

In the late 2000s, Sharp sold desktop PC/TV combos in Japan through its Internet Aquos line, where an X1-style red color scheme was available.
