= List of PC-88 games =

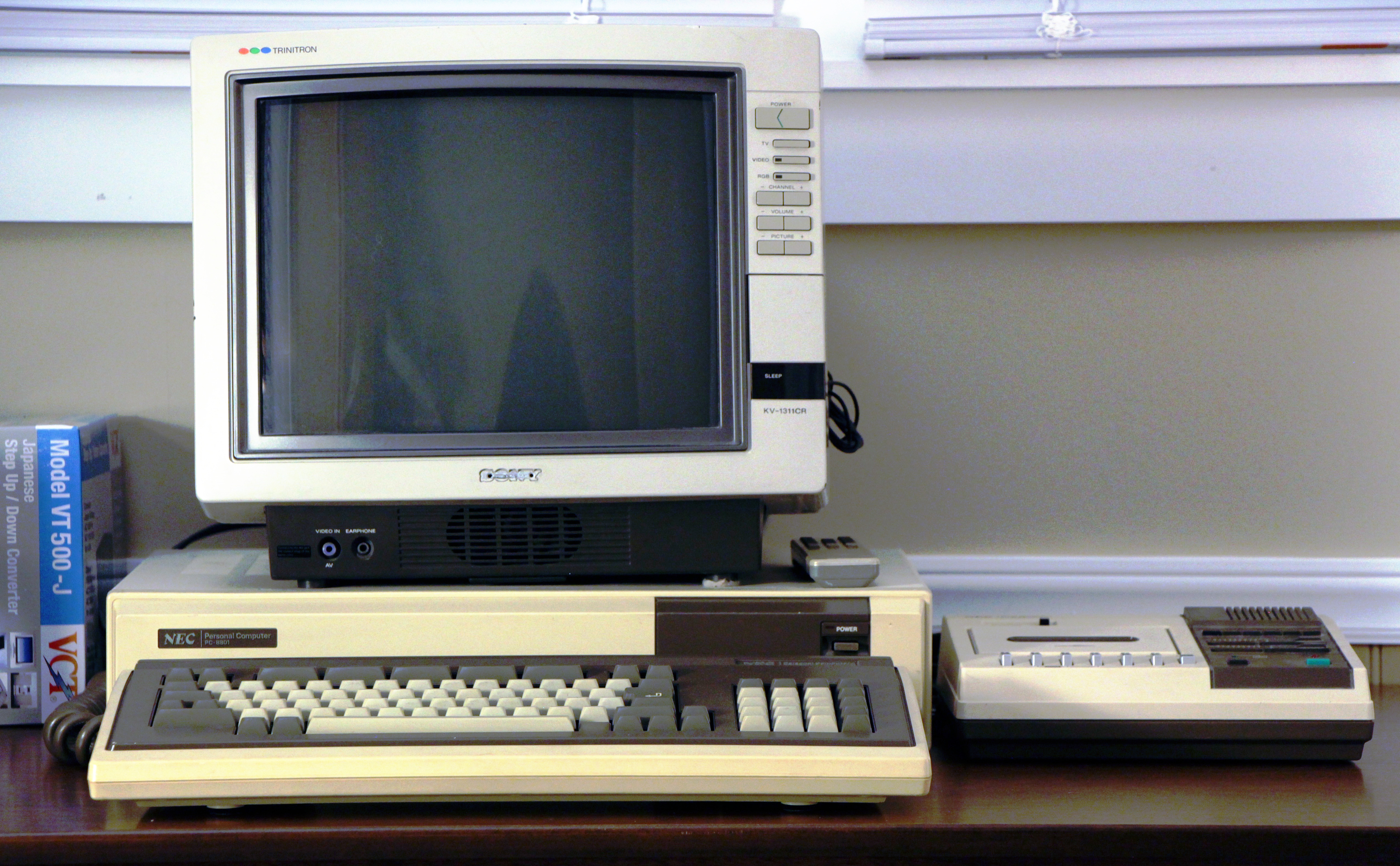
NEC PC-8801

Listed here are all 494 known games released for the PC-88.

== List of games ==
Title	Release date(s)	Developer(s)	Publisher(s)
1000-nen Ōkoku	August 1986	LOG	LOG
177	September 1986	Macadamia Soft	dB-SOFT
1942	1987	Capcom	ASCII Corporation
The 4th Unit 2	July 1988	Data West	Data West
The 4th Unit	December 1987	Data West	Data West
Abunai Tengu Densetsu	December 15, 1989	AliceSoft	AliceSoft
Abyss	January 1984	HummingBirdSoft	HummingBirdSoft
Abyss II: Tears of Emperor	July 1985	HummingBirdSoft	HummingBirdSoft
Acrojet	October 1988	MicroProse	SystemSoft
Advanced Fantasian: Quest for Lost Sanctuary	December 1988	Xtalsoft	Xtalsoft
Adventureland	July 1984		StarCraft, Inc.
A.E.	April 1984	Programmers-3	Comptiq
Aggres	February 1986	Riverhillsoft	Riverhillsoft
AIR	January 1987	Quasar Soft	Quasar Soft
Albatross	February 1986	Telenet Japan	Telenet Japan
Ali Baba and the Forty Thieves	January 1985		StarCraft, Inc.
Alice: Adventures in Wonderland	July 1984	PSK	PSK
Alice-tachi no Gogo Vol. 1	December 1, 1989	New System House Oh!	New System House Oh!
Alice-tachi no Gogo Vol. 2	December 1, 1989	New System House Oh!	New System House Oh!
The Alien	July 1984	Microcomputer Games	CSK Research Institute
Alley Cat	1984	Synapse Software	Kotobuki-Raison
Alpha	July 1986	Square Co.	Square Co.
Alphos	June 1983	Random House	Enix
Alseides: Ushinawareta Zaihō	1990	Fad Boys	Fad Boys
American Truck	May 1985	Telenet Japan	Telenet Japan
The Ancient Art of War	December 1986	Evryware	Broderbund
Angel Hearts	June 16, 1989	ELF Corporation	ELF Corporation
Angels: Celica Crisis	1990	G. Create	G. Create
Angelus: Akuma no Fukuin	July 1988		Enix
Aoki Ōkami to Shiroki Mejika	July 1985	Koei	Koei
Apploon	February 1984	Tose Co.	Phoenix Software
Archon: The Light and the Dark	June 1986	Free Fall Associate	Bullet-Proof Software
Arcshu: Kagerou no Jidai o Koete	December 16, 1989	Wolf Team	Wolf Team
Arctic	May 1988	Artdink Corporation	Artdink Corporation
Arcus	May 1988	Wolf Team	Wolf Team
Arcus II: Silent Symphony	November 1989	Wolf Team	Wolf Team
A Ressha de Ikō	January 1986	Artdink Corporation	Artdink Corporation
Argo	December 1986	Kure Software Koubou	Kure Software Koubou
Arkanoid	December 1986	Taito	Nidecom Soft
Ashe	May 1988	Quasar Soft	Quasar Soft
Assorted Friendship	1988	UII Software	UII Software
Asteka	February 1985	Nihon Falcom	Nihon Falcom
Aya-chan World	1989	H.A.I. System	H.A.I. System
Ayumi	September 1990	Game Technopolis	Game Technopolis
Aztec	November 1984	Datamost	Comptiq
Back to the Future	March 1986	Ponyca	Ponyca
Back to the Future Adventure	December 1986	Data West	Pony Canyon
Balance of Power	July 1989		ASCII Corporation
Balloon Fight	October 1985	Nintendo	Hudson Soft
Bandit Kings of Ancient China	March 1989	Koei	Koei
Bandits 9	1990	Creative H.A.T.	Creative H.A.T.
Bargon no Paka-paka Shōbōken	1988	A-Inn	A-Inn
Bawnded: Chitei Sekai-hen	December 1983	Nihom Micom Gakuen	Nihom Micom Gakuen
Binary Land	December 1983	Hudson Soft	Hudson Soft
Bishōjo Shashinkan: Moving School	January 1987	HARD Software	HARD Software
The Black Onyx	January 1984	Bullet-Proof Software	Bullet-Proof Software
The Blade of Blackpoole	January 1984		StarCraft, Inc.
Bokosuka Wars	January 1984		ASCII Corporation
Bomb Jack	August 1985	Tehkan Ltd.	Softbank Corp.
Boulder Dash	October 1984		Comptiq
Bruce Lee	October 1984	Datasoft	Comptiq
Bug Attack	April 1984	Cavalier Computer	Comptiq
Burai: Jōkan	November 1989	Riverhillsoft	Riverhillsoft
Burning Point	February 1989		Enix
Business Tour	1984	Bothtec	Bothtec
The Byōin	December 1987	PSK	PSK
Can Can Bunny	July 1989	Cocktail Soft	Cocktail Soft
Can Can Bunny Superior	April 16, 1990	Cocktail Soft	Cocktail Soft
The Cannonball Run II	1984		Ponyca
Caroll	October 1990	ZigZag Software	New System House Oh!
Casablanca ni Ai o: Satsujinsha wa Jikū o Koete	1986	Thinking Rabbit	Thinking Rabbit
Castlequest	November 1985	ASCII Corporation	ASCII Corporation
The Castle	April 1985	ASCII Corporation	ASCII Corporation
Chack'n Pop	July 1984	Taito	Nidecom Soft
Championship Lode Runner	October 1985	Broderbund	SystemSoft
Chátty	November 1988	System Sacom	System Sacom
Chikyū Senshi Rayieza	November 1985		Enix
Chobin	September 1984	Bothtec	Bothtec
Choplifter	November 1984		SystemSoft
Choro Q Holiday Puzzle	June 1984	Kogado Studio	Takara
Christine	December 1986	PSK	PSK
The Cockpit	November 1984	Compac	Compac
Columns	April 1992	Sega	SystemSoft
Combat Simulator: Battle Gorilla	April 1988	Xtalsoft	Xtalsoft
Commando	March 1987	Capcom	ASCII Coproation
Conan: Hall of Volta	March 1986	SE Software	Comptiq
Cosmic Soldier	October 1985	Kogado Software	Kogado Software
Cosmic Soldier: Psychic War	June 1987	Kogado Software	Kogado Software
Cosmo Angel	July 1986	PSK	PSK
The Count	February 1985		StarCraft, Inc.
Courageous Perseus	1984	Cosmos Computer	Cosmos Computer
The Coveted Mirror	1986		StarCraft, Inc.
Crescent Moon Girl	December 1989	AliceSoft	AliceSoft
Crimson	November 1987	Xtalsoft	Xtalsoft
The Crimson Crown	January 1986	Polarware	StarCraft, Inc.
Crimson II	March 1989	Xtalsoft	Xtalsoft
Crimson III	May 1990	Xtalsoft	Xtalsoft
Crisis Mountain	August 1984		Comptiq
Critical Mass	1985		StarCraft, Inc.
Cruise Chaser Blassty	1986	Square Co.	Square Co.
Crystal Prison	April 1986	Bothtec	Bothtec
Curse of Babylon	December 1986	Xtalsoft	Xtalsoft
Daisenryaku 88	October 1986	SystemSoft	SystemSoft
Daisenryaku II: Campaign Version	November 1989	SystemSoft	SystemSoft
Danchi-zuma no Yūwaku	June 1983	Koei	Koei
David's Midnight Magic	July 1984	Broderbund	SystemSoft
Death Bringer	February 1989	Renovation Game	Telenet Japan
The Death Trap	October 1984	Square Co.	Square Co.
Deflektor	July 1991	Vortex Software	Bullet-Proof Software
DE・JA	July 1990	ELF Corporation	ELF Corporation
The Demon Crystal	April 1985	YMCAT	Dempa Shimbunsha
Dezeni Land	December 1983	Hudson Soft	Hudson Soft
Dezeni World	December 1985	Hudson Soft	Hudson Soft
Diablo	August 1988		Broderbund
Dig Dug	December 1983	Namco	Dempa Shimbunsha
Digital Devil Monogatari: Megami Tensei	July 1987	Telenet Japan	Telenet Japan
Dimensional Fighter Epsilon3	July 1985	Bullet-Proof Software	Bullet-Proof Software
Dinosaur	December 21, 1990	Nihon Falcom	Nihon Falcom
DIRES: giger・loop	July 25, 1987	Bothtec	Bothtec
Dnieper River Line	January 1984	Microcomputer Games	CSK Research Institute
DOME	January 1988	System Sacom	System Sacom
Donkey Gorilla	1983	Tsukumo Denki	Tsukumo Denki
Donkey Kong 3	October 1984	Nintendo	Hudson Soft
Door Door	February 1983	Chunsoft	Enix
Doujin Kaizokuban	1991	Ayashige-Soft	Ayashige-Soft
D.P.S: Dream Program System	March 15, 1990	AliceSoft	AliceSoft
Dragon Buster	1987	Namco	Enix
Dragon Eyes	February 1991	Game Technopolis	Game Technopolis
Dragon Knight	1989	ELF Corporation	ELF Corporation
Dragon Knight II	December 20, 1990	ELF Corporation	ELF Corporation
The Dragon & Princess	December 1982	Koei	Koei
Dragon Slayer	November 1984	Nihon Falcom	Nihon Falcom
Dragon Slayer: The Legend of Heroes	December 1989	Nihon Falcom	Nihon Falcom
Dragon Slayer: The Legend of Heroes II	March 19, 1992	Nihon Falcom	Nihon Falcom
Dragoon Armor for Adult	September 1989	FairyTale	FairyTale
Dream Program System SG	September 15, 1990	AliceSoft	AliceSoft
Dream Program System SG Set 2	April 15, 1991	AliceSoft	AliceSoft
Dream Program System SG set 3	December 15, 1991	AliceSoft	AliceSoft
Drol	August 1985		Soft Pro International
Dual Targets: The 4th Unit Act.3	April 1989	Data West	Data West
Duel	October 9, 1989	Kure Software Koubou	Kure Software Koubou
Dungeon	December 1983	Koei	Koei
Dynamite Bowl	October 1987	Softvision	Toshiba-EMI
EGGY	February 1985	Bothtec	Bothtec
The Eidolon	October 1987	Lucasfilm	Pony Canyon
El Dorado Denki	January 1985		Enix
Elevator Action	March 1986	Taito	Nidecom Soft
Emerald Densetsu	June 15, 1990	New System House Oh!	New System House Oh!
Emerald Dragon	November 1989	Glodia	Basho House
Eric and the Floaters	July 1983	Hudson Soft	Hudson Soft
Escape from Rungistan	April 1986	Sirius Software	StarCraft, Inc.
Excitebike	October 1985	Nintendo	Hudson Soft
Exile	December 1989	Renovation Game	Telenet Japan
Expedition Amazon	November 1984	Penguin Software	StarCraft, Inc.
Exterlien	July 26, 1990	D.O. Corp	D.O. Corp
F-15 Strike Eagle	1988	MicroProse	SystemSoft
Fantasian	February 1985	Xtalsoft	Xtalsoft
Fathom's 40	April 1984		Comptiq
Final Lolita: Darkside of Software	January 1986	PSK	PSK
Final Zone Wolf	May 1986	Wolf Team	Telenet Japan
The Fire Crystal	September 1984	Bullet-Proof Software	Bullet-Proof Software
Fire Hawk: Thexder - The Second Contact	November 1989	Game Arts	Game Arts
Flappy	1983	dB-Soft	dB-Soft
Flicky	November 1985	Sega	Micronet
Flight Simulator with Torpedo Attack	1988	Sublogic	Sublogic
Flying Ace	October 1984	Microcomputer Games	CSK Research Institute
Formation Z	April 1986	Hect Co., Jaleco	Nippon Dexter
Fortress	February 1989	Iconographics	Cross Media Soft
Fortress of the Witch King	January 1984		CSK Research Institute
Foxy	March 1990	ELF Corporation	ELF Corporation
Fray in Magical Adventure	December 20, 1991	Microcabin	Microcabin
Free Trader	October 1984	Microcomputer Games	Kiya Overseas Industry
Free Way	October 1984	Bothtec	Bothtec
Front Line	September 1983	Taito	Nideocom Soft
Fruit Panic	February 1984		Pony, Inc.
Fruits Fields	February 1987	Compac	Compac
Gaiflame	December 1987	Masaya	NCS Corporation
Galactic Wars	July 1982	Nihon Falcom	Nihon Falcom
Galaxian	December 1983	Namco	Dempa Shimbunsha
Gandhara: Buddha no Seisen	May 1987		Enix
Gaudi: Barcelona no Kaze	June 1, 1989	Wolf Team	Wolf Team
Gemfire	September 27, 1991	Koei	Koei
Gemstone Warrior	March 1986	Paradigm Creators	StarCraft, Inc.
Genesis: Beyond the Revelation	January 1988	Square Co.	Square Co.
Genghis Khan	January 1988	Koei	Koei
Genghis Khan II: Clan of the Gray Wolf	July 30, 1992	Koei	Koei
Genma Taisen	March 1983	Pony Canyon	Pony Canyon
Ghosts 'N Goblins	July 1987	Capcom	ASCII Corporation
Ginga Eiyū Densetsu	March 1989	Bothtec	Bothtec
Ginga Eiyū Densetsu II	December 1990	Bothtec	Bothtec
Golf	April 1985	Nintendo	Hudson Soft
The Goonies	October 1986	Konami	Konami
Gradius	August 1986	Konami	Konami
Grobda	1986	Namco	Dempa Shimbunsha
Gumball	December 1984		Enix
Gunship	July 13, 1990	MicroProse	MicroProse
Gyrodine	June 1986	Crux	Nidecom Soft
Hacchake Ayayo-san	February 28, 1989	HARD Software	HARD
Hacchake Ayayo-san 2: Ikenai Holiday	April 26, 1990	HARD Software	HARD
Hacker	February 1988	Activision	Pony Canyon
Hang-On	December 1986	Sega	Pax Electronica
Han-Seimei Senki Andorogynus	December 1987	Telenet Japan	Telenet Japan
Harvest	February 1984		Micronet
Herlesh	1988	Xain	Xain
Heroes of the Lance	October 1989	U.S. Gold	Pony Canyon
Herzog	May 1988	Technosoft	Technosoft
Highrise	January 1985		Comptuq
Hi-Res Adventure #0: Mission Asteroid	April 1983	Sierra On-Line	StarCraft, Inc.
Hi-Res Adventure #1: Mystery House	April 1983	Sierra On-Line	StarCraft, Inc.
Hi-Res Adventure #2: The Wizard and the Princess	May 1983	Sierra On-Line	StarCraft, Inc.
Hi-Res Adventure #3: Cranston Manor	October 1983	Sierra On-Line	StarCraft, Inc.
Hi-Res Adventure #4: Ulysses and the Golden Fleece	December 1983	Sierra On-Line	StarCraft, Inc.
Hi-Res Adventure #6: The Dark Crystal	January 1984	Sierra On-Line	StarCraft, Inc.
Hokkaidō Rensa Satsujin: Okhotsk ni Kiyu	December 21, 1984	Armor Project	Login Soft
Hokuto no Ken	May 1986		Enix
Hole Chaser	April 24, 1990	Sensui Software	Birdy Soft
Hole in One	August 1985	HAL Laboratory	HAL Laboratory
Hoshi no Suna Monogatari	March 1991	D.O. Corp	D.O. Corp
Hotdog	June 1985	Bothtec	Bothtec
Hotel Wars	April 1987	Bothtec	Bothtec
Hover Attack	August 1985		Compac
Hydlide	December 1984	T&E Soft	T&E Soft
Hydlide II: Shine of Darkness	October 1985	T&E Soft	T&E Soft
Ice Climber	October 1985	Nintendo	Hudson Soft
Illumina	December 5, 1990	Cocktail Soft	Cocktail Soft
Impossible Mission	November 1985	Epyx	Comptiq
Inindo: Way of the Ninja	July 19, 1991	Koei	Koei
In The Psychic City	December 1984	Hot-B	Hot-B
Intruder: Sakura Yashiki no Tansaku	July 1989	AliceSoft	AliceSoft
Ishidō: The Way of Stones	April 1990	Software Resources International	ASCII Corporation
Ishin no Arashi	April 1989	Koei	Koei
Jackie Chan no Project A	1984	Pony, Inc.	Pony, Inc.
Jack Nicklaus' Greatest 18 Holes of Major Championship Golf	April 21, 1990	Sculptured Software	Cross Media Soft
J.B. Harold 3: D.C. Connection	June 15, 1989	Riverhillsoft	Riverhillsoft
Jehard	October 1987	Xtalsoft	Xtalsoft
Jesus	April 1987		Enix
Jesus II	March 24, 1991	Enix	Enix
Jet	March 1989	Sublogic	Sublogic
Jigoku no Renshū Mondai	September 1984	HummingBirdSoft	HummingBirdSoft
Joshi Daisei Private	November 1983	Nihon Falcom	Nihon Falcom
Kabul Spy	March 1984		StarCraft, Inc.
Karuizawa Yūkai Annai	May 1985		Enix
Ken to Mahō	August 1983	Koei	Koei
Khufu-Ō no Himitsu	May 1983	Koei	Koei
Kimagure Orange Road: Natsu no Mirage	September 1988	Microcabin	Microcabin
King Flappy	1985	db-SOFT	db-SOFT
King's Knight	June 1987	Square Co.	Square Co.
Kiss of Murder	December 1987		Riverhillsoft
Klax	December 1990	Hudson Soft	Hudson Soft
Knither: Demon Crystal II	May 1987	YMCAT	Dempa Shimbunsha
Kyan Kyan Collection	1987	I-cell	I-cell
Kyōran no Ginga: Schwarzschild	December 4, 1989	Kogado Studio	Kogado Studio
Labyrinth	June 1987	Lucasfilm Games	Pack-In-Video
Lamia-1999	January 1987	Hudson Soft	Hudson Soft
Laplace no Ma	July 4, 1987	HummingBirdSoft	HummingBirdSoft
Laptick	1985	dB-SOFT	dB-SOFT
Last Armageddon	July 1988	BrainGrey	BrainGrey
Las Vegas	January 1987	On-Line Systems, StarCraft, Inc.	StarCraft, Inc.
Law of the West	May 1987	Accolade, Inc.	Pony Canyon
Legend	1987	Quasar Soft	Quasar Soft
L'Empereur	July 1990	Koei	Koei
Light Flipper	June 1983		Enix
Lightning Vaccus: The Knight of Iron	March 1989	NCS Corporation	NCS Corporation
Lipstick Adventure 2	December 1989	FairyTale	FairyTale
Little Computer People	December 1987	Activision	Pony Canyon
Lizard	December 1984	Xtalsoft	Riverhillsoft
Lode Runner	December 1983	Broderbund	SystemSoft
Lolita 2: Gekō Chase	October 1983		Enix
Lolita: Yakyūken	May 1983	PSK	PSK
Lot Lot	1986	Irem	Technopolis Soft
Lunar Pool	June 1985	Compile	Ponyca
Lyrane	January 1987	Glodia	Bullet-Proof Software
Mabel's Mansion	December 1985		Comptiq
Macross	September 1985	Alex Bros	Bothtec
Mahjong Clinic: Zōkangō	February 28, 1991	Home Data Corp.	Home Data Corp.
Maison Ikkoku: Kanketsuhen	May 1988	Microcabin	Microcabin
Maison Ikkoku: Omoide no Photograph	December 10, 1986	Microcabin	Microcabin
Manhattan Requiem	July 1987	Riverhillsoft	Riverhillsoft
Mappy	May 1986	Namco	Dempa Shimbunsha
Märchen Veil I	August 1985	System Sacom	System Sacom
Mari-chan Kiki Ippatsu	February 1983		Enix
Mario Bros.	February 1984	Nintendo	Westside Soft House
Mario Bros. Special	1984	Hudson Soft	Hudson Soft
Mashō Denki: La Valeur	October 1989	Kogado Studio	Kogado Studio
Masquerade	November 1985		StarCraft, Inc.
Master of Monsters	October 1988	SystemSoft	SystemSoft
Mid-Garts	April 1989	Wolf Team	Wolf Team
Might and Magic: Book One - Secret of the Inner Sanctum	December 1987	New World Computing	StarCraft, Inc.
Might and Magic II: Gates to Another World	December 1988	New World Computing	StarCraft, Inc.
Miner 2049er	April 1984	Big Five Software	Comptiq
Mirai	1985	Sein-Soft	Sein-Soft
Mirrors	December 10, 1990	Soft Studio Wing	Soft Studio Wing
Misty Blue	April 2, 1990		Enix
Misty Vol.1	September 1989	Data West	Data West
Misty Vol.2	November 24, 1989	Data West	Data West
Misty Vol.3	January 1990	Data West	Data West
Misty Vol.4	July 24, 1990	Data West	Data West
Misty Vol.5	September 20, 1990	Data West	Data West
Misty Vol.6	November 1990	Data West	Data West
Misty Vol.7	January 25, 1991	Data West	Data West
Mole Mole	July 1985		Cross Media Soft
Mole Mole 2	April 1986		Cross Media Soft
Mr. Robot and His Robot Factory	August 1984	Datamost	Comptiq
Mugen no Shinzō	March 1984	Xtalsoft	Xtalsoft
Mugen no Shinzō II	November 1985	Xtalsoft	Xtalsoft
Mugen no Shinzō III	January 12, 1990	Xtalsoft	Xtalsoft
Mugen Senshi Valis II	July 1989	Renovation Game	Telenet Japan
M.U.L.E.	November 1987	Ozark Softscape	Bullet-Proof Software
Murder Club	August 1986	Riverhillsoft	Riverhillsoft
My Lolita	March 1985	Koei	Koei
Mystery Fun House	May 1985		StarCraft, Inc.
Nagakute Amai Yoru: Twilight Zone III	August 1989	Great Co., Ltd.	Great Co., Ltd.
Night Life	1982	Koei	Koei
Ninja-kun	July 1983	Microcabin	Microcabin
Ninja-Kun: Majō no Bōken	May 1986	UPL Co.	Nippon Dexter
Nobunaga no Yabō	1983	Koei	Koei
Nobunaga's Ambition	December 1986	Koei	Koei
Nobunaga's Ambition II	December 1988	Koei	Koei
Nobunaga's Ambition: Lord of Darkness	December 1990	Koei	Koei
Nuts & Milk	July 1984	Hudson Soft	Hudson Soft
Ogre	April 1987	Origin Systems	SystemSoft
The Old Village Story	December 1988		Enix
Omotesandō Adventure	March 1982		ASCII Corporation
Onryō Senki	September 1988	Soft Studio Wing	Soft Studio Wing
Operation Europe: Path to Victory 1939-45	December 21, 1991	Koei	Koei
Oranda Tsuma wa Denki Unagi no Yume o Miru ka?	December 1984	Koei	Koei
Pachicom	January 1987	Bear's Corporation	Toshiba-EMI
Pac-Man	December 1983	Namco	Dempa Shimbunsha
Paladin	December 1985	Bothtec	Bothtec
Panorama Toh	December 1983	Nihon Falcom	Nihon Falcom
Peeping Scandal	December 1984	Bothtec	Bothtec
Penguin-Kun Wars	1985	UPL Co.	ASCII Corporation
Perfect Soko-ban	November 1989	Thinking Rabbit	Thinking Rabbit
Phantasie	August 1986		StarCraft, Inc.
Phantasie II	March 1987		StarCraft, Inc.
Phantasie III: The Wrath of Nikademus	July 1988		StarCraft, Inc.
Phantasie IV: The Birth of Heroes	September 1990	StarCraft, Inc.	StarCraft, Inc.
Pias	August 10, 1990	Birdy Soft	Birdy Soft
Pinball Construction Set	August 1985		Comptiq
Pinky Ponky Dai-1 Shū: Beautiful Dream	August 1989	ELF Corporation	ELF Corporation
Pinky Ponky Dai-2 Shū: Twilight Games	August 1989	ELF Corporation	ELF Corporation
Pinky Ponky Dai-3 Shū: Battle Lovers	August 1989	ELF Corporation	ELF Corporation
Pipe Dream	October 1991	The Assembly Line	Bullet-Proof Software
Pirate Adventure	September 1984		StarCraft, Inc.
Pocky	January 1989	Ponytail Soft	Ponytail Soft
Pocky 2: Kaijin Aka Manto no Chōsen	July 10, 1991	Ponytail Soft	Ponytail Soft
Poibos Part 1: Dasshutsu	November 1983	Zat Soft	Zat Soft
Polar Star	1984	Hyo-Kin Soft	Carry Lab
Pool of Radiance	December 1989	Strategic Simulations, Inc.	Pony Canyon
Popful Mail	December 20, 1991	Nihon Falcom	Nihon Falcom
The Portopia Serial Murder Case	June 1983		Enix
Produce	July 1987	dB-SOFT	dB-SOFT
Professional Mahjong Gokū	December 25, 1986	Chat Noir	ASCII Corporation
Psy-O-Blade	November 1988	T&E Soft	T&E Soft
P.T.O.: Pacific Theater of Operations	November 1989	Koei	Koei
Punch Ball Mario Bros.	1984	Hudson Soft	Hudson Soft
PuzzlePanic	October 1985	Fun and Games	SystemSoft
The Quest	August 1984		StarCraft, Inc.
Rainbow Walker	1984	Synapse Software Corporation	Kotobuki-Raison
Rance: Hikari o Motomete	August 15, 1989	AliceSoft	AliceSoft
Rance II: Hangyaku no Shōjotachi	November 1990	AliceSoft	AliceSoft
Ray Gun	September 1990	ELF Corporation	ELF Corporation
Realms of Darkness	September 1989	Strategic Simulations, Inc.	StarCraft, Inc.
Relics	May 1986	Bothtec	Bothtec
Replicart	April 1988		Taito
The Return of Ishtar	August 8, 1987	Namco	SPS
Riglas	January 1986	Random House	Random House
Ring Quest	August 1985		StarCraft, Inc.
Roadwar 2000	July 1988	Strategic Simulations, Inc.	StarCraft, Inc.
Robo Wres 2001	July 1986	Sega	Micronet
Rogue	January 1986	A.I. Design	ASCII Corporation
Rollerball	October 1985	HAL Laboratory	HAL Laboratory
Romance of the Three Kingdoms	December 1985	Koei	Koei
Romance of the Three Kingdoms II	December 1989	Koei	Koei
Romancia: Dragon Slayer Jr.	October 1986	Nihon Falcom	Nihon Falcom
R-Type	October 1988	Irem Corp.	NEC
Run Run Kyōsōkyoku	October 1989	ELF Corporation	ELF Corporation
Salad no Kuni no Tomato-hime	July 1984	Hudson Soft	Hudson Soft
Sammy Lightfoot	June 1985	Sierra On-Line	Comptiq
The Scheme	August 1988	Bothtec	Bothtec
Schwarzschild II: Teikoku no Haishin	December 1989	Kogado Studio	Kogado Studio
The Screamer	May 25, 1985	MagicalZoo	MagicalZoo
Secret Mission	August 1984		StarCraft, Inc.
Seiken Densetsu	November 1983	Compac	Compac
Shanghai	April 1987	Activision	SystemSoft
Shanghai II	April 27, 1990	Sun Electronics	SystemSoft
Sherwood Forest	June 1984		StarCraft, Inc.
Shi-Kin-Joh	December 1989	Scap Trust	Scap Trust
Shiryō Sensen 2 - War of the Dead Part 2	June 1989	Fun Project	Victor Musical Industries
Shiryō Sensen - War of the Dead: Browning no Fukkatsu	January 1989	Fun Project	Victor Musical Industries
Shuten Dōji	September 1990		Enix
Sid Meier's Pirates!	July 1989	MicroProse	MicroProse
Silpheed	December 5, 1986	Game Arts	Game Arts
Silver Ghost	April 1988	Kure Software Koubou	Kure Software Koubou
Skapon Taikentai: The Enchanted Hunters	October 1988	PSK	PSK
Skyfox	March 1988	Raymond E. Tobey	Electronic Arts
Slime Master	1989	Slime Soft	Slime Soft
Snatcher	November 26, 1988	Konami	Konami
Soko-Ban	December 1982	Thinking Rabbit	Thinking Rabbit
Solitaire Poker	August 1989	Login Soft	ASCII Corporation
Solitaire Royale	June 3, 1988	Software Resources International	Game Arts
Sorcerian	December 1987	Nihon Falcom	Nihon Falcom
Space Adventure: Zodiac	June 1985	Riverhillsoft	Riverhillsoft
Space Diamond	October 1984	Bothtec	Bothtec
Space Harrier	September 1987	AM R&D Dept. #2	Dempa Shimbunsha
Space Station Zulu	May 1984	Microcomputer Games	Kiya Overseas
Spy vs Spy	August 1986	First Star Software	Hot-B Co.
Star Cruiser	May 1988	Arsys Software	Arsys Software
Starship Rendezvous	April 1988	ARKLIGHT	Scap Trust
Star Struck	August 1983	PSK	PSK
Still Sword	April 1988	FairyTale	FairyTale
Still Sword for Adult	July 1988	FairyTale	FairyTale
The Story of Melroon	1989	dB-SOFT	dB-SOFT
Strange Odyssey	December 1984		StarCraft, Inc.
Summer Games	July 1986	Epyx	Pony Canyon
Super Billiards	January 1985	HAL Laboratory	HAL Laboratory
Super Daisenryaku	March 1988	SystemSoft	SystemSoft
Super Hydlide	November 1987	T&E Soft	T&E Soft
Super Mario Bros. Special	1986	Hudson Soft	Hudson Soft
Super Pitfall	November 1986	Pony, Inc.	Pony, Inc.
Super Zenon: Defender Force Gamma5	May 1986	Kure Software Koubou	Dempa Shimbunsha
Swashbuckler	January 1985	Datamost	Comptiq
Taiyō no Shinden	October 1986	Nihon Falcom	Nihon Falcom
T.D.F. Kaijū daisensō kesshi no genshiro bōei sakusen	August 1987	Data West	Data West
Teiō no Yabō	1989	Pussy CAT	Pussy CAT
Telengard	January 1984	Microcomputer Games, Orion Software	Kiya Overseas
Tennis	June 1985	Nintendo	Hudson Soft
Tenshitachi no Gogo	June 1985	JAST Co.	JAST Co.
Tenshitachi no Gogo II: Bangai-hen	April 1988	JAST Co.	JAST Co.
Tenshitachi no Gogo III: Bangai-hen	November 1989	JAST Co.	JAST Co.
Tenshitachi no Gogo III: Ribbon	August 1989	JAST Co.	JAST Co.
Tenshitachi no Gogo II: Minako	August 1987	JAST Co.	JAST Co.
Testament	October 1987	Glodia	Basho House
Tetris	November 1988	Bullet-Proof Software	Bullet-Proof Software
T.G.I.F.	December 1984	Microcomputer Games	Kiya Overseas
The Heist	August 1984	Livesay Computer Games	Comptiq
Thexder	April 1985	Game Arts	Game Arts
Thunder Force	January 1984	Tecno Soft	Tecno Soft
Time Zone	February 1985	Sierra On-Line	StarCraft, Inc.
Tir-nan-óg: The Forbidden Tower	August 24, 1990	SystemSoft	SystemSoft
Tōdō Ryūnosuke Tantei Nikki: Kohakuiro no Yuigon	June 1988	Riverhillsoft	Riverhillsoft
Topple Zip	1986	MiCROViSion Inc.	Bothtec
Transylvania	January 1984	Penguin Software	StarCraft, Inc.
Tritorn	October 1985	Sein-Soft	Sein-Soft
Tritorn II: Road of Darkness	November 1988	Xain	Xain
Tunnels & Trolls: Crusaders of Khazan	April 1990	StarCraft, Inc.	StarCraft, Inc.
Twilight Zone	April 1987	Great Co., Ltd.	Great Co., Ltd.
Twilight Zone II: Nagisa no Yakata	October 1988	Great Co., Ltd.	Great Co., Ltd.
Twilight Zone Vol. 4: Tokubetsu-hen	April 23, 1990	Great Co., Ltd.	Great Co., Ltd.
Ultima I	December 1988	Origin Systems	Pony Canyon
Ultima II: The Revenge of the Enchantress	September 1985		StarCraft, Inc.
Ultima III: Exodus	December 1985	Origin Systems	StarCraft, Inc.
Ultima IV: Quest of the Avatar	July 1987	Origin Systems	Pony Canyon
Ultima V: Warriors of Destiny	1990	Origin Systems	Pony Canyon
Uncharted Waters	May 1990	Koei	Koei
Urotsukidōji	May 25, 1990	FairyTale	FairyTale
Vain Dream	July 13, 1991	Glodia	Glodia
Valis: The Fantasm Soldier	December 1986	Wolf Team	Telenet Japan
VC	January 1984	Microcomputer Games	CSK Research
Veigues: Tactical Gladiator	December 16, 1988	Game Arts	Game Arts
Volguard	July 1984	dB-SOFT	dB-SOFT
Voodoo Castle	October 1984		StarCraft, Inc.
Voyager I: Sabotage of the Robot Ship	January 1984	Kiya Overseas	Microcomputer Games
Wibarm	August 1986	Arsys Software	Arsys Software
Will: The Death Trap II	September 1985	Square Co.	Square Co.
Wingman	November 1984	TamTam Co.	Enix
Winter Games	January 1987	Action Graphics	Pony Canyon
Wizardry: Knight of Diamonds – The Second Scenario	February 1987	Sir-Tech	ASCII Corporation
Wizardry: Legacy of Llylgamyn – The Third Scenario	July 1987	Sir-Tech	ASCII Corporation
Wizardry: The Return of Werdna – The Fourth Scenario	December 1988	Sir-Tech	ASCII Corporation
Wizardry V: Heart of the Maelstrom	June 1990	Sir-Tech	ASCII Corporation
World Golf	July 1985		Enix
Xak II: Rising of the Redmoon	September 1990	Microcabin	Microcabin
Xak Precious Package: The Tower of Gazzel	June 14, 1991	Microcabin	Microcabin
Xak: The Art of Visual Stage	May 1989	Microcabin	Microcabin
Xanadu: Dragon Slayer II	October 1985	Nihon Falcom	Nihon Falcom
Xanadu: Scenario II	October 1986	Nihon Falcom	Nihon Falcom
Xevious	November 1985	Namco	Enix
X・na	September 21, 1990	FairyTale	FairyTale
XZR	August 1988	Renovation Game	Telenet Japan
Yellow Lemon	August 1985	PSK	PSK
Yesterday	September 18, 1990	New System House Oh!	New System House Oh!
Yojigen Shōjo Lydia	February 1984	Champion Soft	Champion Soft
Yōkai Tantei Chima Chima	August 1984	Alex Bros	Bothtec
Ys: The Vanished Omens	June 1987	Nihon Falcom	Nihon Falcom
Ys II: Ancient Ys Vanished – The Final Chapter	April 1988	Nihon Falcom	Nihon Falcom
Ys III: Wanderers from Ys	July 1989	Nihon Falcom	Nihon Falcom
Zan: Yasha Enbukyoku	September 4, 1990	Wolf Team	Wolf Team
Zarth	August 1984	Studio Jandora	Enix
Zavas	December 1988	Glodia	Popcom Soft
Zeliard	December 1987	Game Arts	Game Arts
Zerø: The 4th Unit Act.4	July 5, 1990	Data West	Data West
Zexas	February 1984	dB-SOFT	dB-SOFT
Zoom in Space	July 1983	Riverhillsoft	Riverhillsoft
