= High Rise =

High Rise, High-Rise or Highrise may refer to:

- High-rise, a tall building or structure

== Film and digital media ==
- Highrise (documentary), a web documentary series directed by Katerina Cizek
- Highrise (video game), a 2020 mobile social simulation game
- High-Rise (film), a 2015 film by director Ben Wheatley, based on the novel by J. G. Ballard
- Someone's Watching Me! (also known as High Rise), a 1978 TV movie written and directed by John Carpenter

== Music ==
- High Rise (band), a noise rock band from Tokyo, Japan
- High Rise (EP), a 2013 EP by Stone Temple Pilots with Chester Bennington
- "High Rise", a song by Hawkwind from their 1979 album PXR5
- "High Rise", a song by Houston Calls from their 2005 album A Collection of Short Stories
- "High Rise", a song by Ladytron from their 2005 album Witching Hour
- "Highrise", a song by Tall Dwarfs from their 1994 album 3 EPs
- "Hi-Rise", a song by the New Pornographers from their 2014 album Brill Bruisers

== Other uses ==
- High-rise (fashion), a conservative type of fashion that contrasts with low-rise fashion
- High-Rise (horse), a Thoroughbred racehorse who won the Epsom Derby in 1998
- High-Rise (novel), a 1975 novel by J. G. Ballard
- A web-based CRM application created by 37signals
