= Beat Angel Escalayer =

Video game series

- Cover art for Beat Angel Escalayer Anime

超昂天使エスカレイヤー (Chōkō Tenshi Esukareiyā)
- Genre: eroge, magical girl
- Video game
- Publisher: JP: AliceSoft; WW: MangaGamer
- Genre: Visual novel, RPG
- Platform: PC
- Released: JP: August 2, 2002 (Beat Angel Escalayer); JP: July 24, 2014 (Reboot); WW: Jun 11, 2020 ("Beat Angel Escalayer R")
- Original video animation
- Directed by: Ichika Doshita
- Produced by: Mochizuki Yuutarou
- Written by: Muramatsu Jirou
- Music by: The Beans
- Studio: Pink Pineapple
- Licensed by: AUS: Siren Visual; NA: Kitty Media
- Released: September 27, 2002
- Episodes: 3

Beat Angel Escalayer (超昂天使エスカレイヤー, Chōkō Tenshi Esukareiyā) is an eroge series created by Alice Soft.

== Plot ==
Sayuka Kōenji is the guardian of the Earth and can transform into her alter ego Escalayer to protect the world from the evil forces of the Dielast. However, to transform into Escalayer, she must recharge her power source, the Doki Doki Dynamo, which can only be recharged through sexual excitement. This was previously achieved through lesbian sex with her gynoid friend Madoka; however, this has become less effective, and Madoka recruits the school playboy Kyōhei Yanase, whose vast sexual experience will help Sayuka transform.

== Characters ==
Sayuka Kōenji (高円寺 沙由香, Kōenji Sayuka)
Voiced by: Hiroko Taguchi
The main protagonist. She commands the ability to transform into a super powered being known as "Escalayer" upon "charging" the Doki Doki Dynamo through sexual activity. As the story develops, she is seen to grow feelings toward Kyōhei, eventually professing her love to him. Her main weapon is a shape-shifting energy whip.

Kyōhei Yanase (柳瀬 恭平, Yanase Kyōhei)
Voiced by: Takahiro Sakurai
The school playboy and Sayuka's childhood friend. Kyōhei is blackmailed into helping Sayuka after he is discovered eavesdropping on an unsuccessful charging session. While at first their relationship was strictly used for the aim of charging the Dynamo, Kyōhei rediscovers the feelings he once held for her. Acknowledging these feelings, he proceeds to profess them to her.

Madoka Kōenji (高円寺 マドカ, Kōenji Madoka)
Voiced by: Kaoru Morota
Sayuka's gynoid companion. Self-sacrificing and no-nonsense, she often has to ground Sayuka and Kyōhei back in reality with the importance of their mission. She initially considers Kyōhei a simple tool, insulting his inability to stimulate Sayuka as time progresses. She later develops a deeper relationship with him towards the end, however. Her main weapon is a gun attached to her right arm.

== Releases ==
The anime series was released on DVD in North America through Kitty Media, both subtitled and dubbed, and by Siren Visual in Australia and New Zealand under its Hentai Collection label. The original game has not been officially released outside Japan.

A series of three novels were published by Paradigm Novels:

- Beat Angel Escalayer joukan (超昂天使エスカレイヤー 上巻)
- Beat Angel Escalayer chuukan (超昂天使エスカレイヤー 中巻)
- Beat Angel Escalayer gekan (超昂天使エスカレイヤー 下巻)

A remake of the game titled Beat Angel Escalayer Reboot (超昂天使エスカレイヤー・リブート, Chōkō Tenshi Esukareiyā Ribūto) was released on 25 July 2014. Worldwide English version of the game was released by MangaGamer Jun 11, 2020 under the title "Beat Angel Escalayer R". It was based on the "Reboot" version of the original game.

== Reception ==
Overall, critics have deemed Beat Angel Escalayer to be a quite likable game. Chris Beveridge recommended it as a "really fun and enjoyable quality adult series."
