= Pokémon Conquest =

2012 video game

- North American box art
- Developer: Tecmo Koei
- Publishers: JP: The Pokémon Company; WW: Nintendo
- Director: Osamu Mieda
- Producer: Hisashi Koinuma
- Series: Pokémon; Nobunaga's Ambition
- Platform: Nintendo DS
- Release: JP: March 17, 2012; NA: June 18, 2012; AU: June 21, 2012; EU: July 27, 2012
- Genre: Tactical role-playing game
- Modes: Single-player, multiplayer

Pokémon Conquest, known in Japan as Pokémon + Nobunaga's Ambition (ポケモン+ノブナガの野望, Pokemon Purasu Nobunaga no Yabō), is a 2012 tactical role-playing video game developed by Tecmo Koei and published by The Pokémon Company and Nintendo for the Nintendo DS. The game is a crossover between the Pokémon and Nobunaga's Ambition video game series. The game was released in Japan on March 17, 2012 and was released in North America, Australia, and Europe later that year.

The prospect of a crossover between these two series was formed due in part to The Pokémon Company president Tsunekazu Ishihara enjoying Nobunaga's Ambition, with Tecmo Koei handling programming, art, graphics, and sound, while the two companies collaborated on design documents and concepts. When being localized into English, the designers opted to not change Japanese names and terms due to how weird the setting would feel without them.

== Gameplay ==
The player, accompanied by an Eevee, travels throughout the Ransei Region (ランセ地方, Ranse-chihō) befriending Pokémon and battling Warriors (ブショー, Bushō) and Warlords (ブショーリーダー, Bushō Rīdā) to conquer and unite the region; Warriors and Warlord Leaders can join the player's party once defeated, allowing the player access to more Pokémon. The gameplay is turn-based strategy and is a tactical RPG, unlike the main-series Pokémon games, with different Pokémon capable of using different attacks and means of movement. Warriors and Warlords also have unique battle-changing powers that boost their Pokémon's abilities but may only be used once per battle. These effects range from increased attacking power, health restoration, or even temporary invincibility.

Battle gameplay of Pokémon Conquest, with the touch screen on the bottom

Unlike in the main-series Pokémon games, each Pokémon is capable of using only one move. This move is determined by the Pokémon's species and is usually picked to represent that species; for example, Excadrill uses its signature move Drill Run. Additionally, only 200 of the 649 Pokémon that existed at that time of release are available in the game. The main-series capture system is replaced by a minigame where a Warrior attempts to form a link with a wild Pokémon by coordinating button presses with a display, reminiscent of Dance Dance Revolution. The main-series leveling system is replaced by a concept called "link", a percentage which increases to a certain maximum, and reflects that Pokémon's battling statistics. Each Warrior has a natural affinity to certain types, which grants an increased maximum link with Pokémon of those types. In addition, every Warrior and Warlord has one evolutionary family of Pokémon with which they may form a 100%, or "perfect link". In addition, certain Warlords can form links with legendary Pokémon. A Warlord's costume almost always resembles the appearance of at least one of their "perfect link" species. Additionally, the main-series evolution system is changed to reflect the removal of Pokémon levels. Instead of a Pokémon reaching a specific level, they evolve by reaching certain conditions such as reaching a specific link, winning a battle in a specific kingdom, or having a stat reach a certain value. Warlords are also able to evolve by reaching certain conditions, such as achieving a certain link percentage with a Pokémon. Other than the player, warlords cannot evolve until after completing the main story.

== Plot ==
Pokémon Conquest follows a legend that whomever unifies all 17 kingdoms of the Ransei region will have a chance to encounter the Legendary Pokémon, Arceus, who created the region. This legend is responsible for the current conflict in the region and the end of its peaceful era. The protagonist, the Warlord of the Aurora kingdom, meets a girl named Oichi, who teaches them that Oda Nobunaga wishes to use Arceus' power to destroy Ransei. The player-character eventually defeats Nobunaga and unites the region, finding Arceus and battling Nobunaga again. After defeating him, the player learns that Nobunaga intended to destroy Arceus in order to unite Ransei and remove the cause of the conflict, but relents due to the player being unaffected by their connection to Arceus. The kingdoms are then returned to their proper owners.

== Development ==
Development of Pokémon Conquest began as a result of a mutual interest between the creators of Pokémon and Nobunaga's Ambition, with The Pokémon Company president Tsunekazu Ishihara particularly enjoying the latter. He asked the Pokémon team about the idea of combining the two series, and asked Hisashi Koinuma to help create the project. Tecmo Koei, the owner of Nobunaga's Ambition, was involved in helping design the game, including programming, art, graphics, and sound, while the design documents and concepts were a collaborative effort. To Koinuma, the most difficult part of the game was balancing the challenge to ensure that it would be more likely to appeal to Pokémon fans. The game was developed by Osamu Mieda.

The game was first revealed at the Shueisha's "Jump Festa" anime and manga event on December 17, 2011. Nintendo and Tecmo Koei announced the game during the event and announced its 2012 release. On April 4, 2012, it was announced on Pokemon.com that Pokémon + Nobunaga's Ambition would be released in the United States on June 18, 2012, as Pokémon Conquest. Seth McMahill, Assistant Manager of Product Marketing at Nintendo, stated that the English localization process was not difficult, noting that localization was handled by The Pokémon Company International near Nintendo headquarters. The localizers discussed how accurate the localization should be, such as using Japanese terms and names. They decided to not change these elements, McMahill stating that obviously Japanese characters having English names would seem too strange. There were also discussions about marketing the game, with McMahill stating that strategy role-playing games were less popular outside of Japan, and there were worries about making it appealing to young players. They ultimately settled on the marketing angle of "A new way to play Pokémon". The game was released in Japan on March 17, 2012, in North America on June 18, in Australia on June 21, and in Europe on July 27.

== Reception ==
Reception

Aggregate score
Aggregator	Score
Metacritic	80/100

Review scores
Publication	Score
Destructoid	8/10
Famitsu	34/40
Game Informer	7/10
IGN	9/10

Pokémon Conquest received positive reviews, possessing a score of 80/100 on Metacritic. In their review, Famitsu reviewers praised the game's accessibility for young players, high replay value, and the mixture of Pokémon with a traditional Japanese historical setting. It is considered one of the best Nintendo DS games by multiple websites, including IGN, GamesRadar+, and Nintendo Life.

According to Japanese video game sales analysis Media Create, Conquest was the highest selling game of its initial launch week in Japan, selling over 172,000 copies. By the end of 2012, the game had sold over 341,000 copies in Japan.
