= Dohna Dohna: Let's Do Bad Things Together =

2020 video game

Dohna Dohna
- Original game cover
- Developer: AliceSoft
- Publishers: JPN: AliceSoft; WW: Shiravune
- Director: Ittenchiroku
- Programmer: Mie Sakuranosaki
- Artist: Gyokai
- Writer: Dice Korogashi
- Composers: L-Minatsu; Takahiro Eguchi; Fumihisa Tanaka
- Platform: Microsoft Windows
- Release: JP: November 27, 2020; WW: October 29, 2021
- Genres: RPG, Eroge
- Mode: Single-player

Dohna Dohna: Let's Do Bad Things Together (Japanese: ドーナドーナ いっしょにわるいことをしよう, Hepburn: Dōnadōna: Issho ni Warui Koto o Shiyō) is a 2020 erotic role playing game developed by Alicesoft. The game deals with serious subjects such as human trafficking, sexual violence, and prostitution, and has been praised for its characterization, themes, and dystopian setting, as well as its visual design.

The original Japanese version released on November 27, 2020. A Simplified Chinese version was released on March 26, 2021, and an English version by Shiravune followed on October 29, 2021. In Japan, Dohna Dohna went on to win industry awards.

== Plot ==
The game takes place in Asougi City, a fictional provincial-city facing the Seto Inland Sea that has been completely taken over by the "Asougi Group", a monolithic megacorporation that controls every aspect of its citizens' lives.

Despite portraying themselves as a benevolent and utopian state, Asougi frequently disappears citizens for arbitrary offenses, especially failing to uphold their rigorous propaganda, and sentences them to what they euphemistically call "Temp Work". The oppressive nature of the regime has given rise to some level of bubbling unrest, manifesting itself in the form of the "Anti-Aso" clans, groups of rebels who fight back against Asougi through crime, including armed robbery, kidnapping, and forced prostitution.

As the Founder's Birthday Ceremony approaches, Asougi's grip on the population tightens, and the Anti-Aso agitate. Meanwhile, the general public turns a blind-eye to goings-on in the city.

Players take control of one of the Anti-Aso clans, Nayuta, and through the game's mechanics, control both their business and battle operations as they strive to out-compete the other clans on the ground and ultimately topple Asougi itself.

== Characters ==
Kuma (クマ)
Kuma, the main protagonist, is Nayuta's second-in-command and is frequently delegated to the most troublesome and unsavory duties for the clan. Though more hardworking and drab than the other members, Kuma seems to be rather popular.
His parents were killed by Asougi through their human experimentation program, and he was chosen to be used as the next "Body Donor". However, his older sister, Amane Nagara, saved him by taking his place, leaving her presumed dead. To exact his sworn revenge on Asougi, he joined the Anti-Aso clan, Nayuta.
Zappa (ザッパ)
Zappa is the reckless and boisterous founder and leader of Nayuta. He is always seeking out ways to have fun.
His real name is Kazutaka Yamamoto, the youngest son of the Asougi founding family. Disgusted with their corrupt regime, he decided to leave, and founded Nayuta to resist Asougi's reign.
Porno (ポルノ)
Porno is a trickster with an affinity for sexual pranks. She was a victim of a nefarious organization called "Reach" before she was rescued by Kuma, and Nayuta took her in. Porno sees herself as Kuma's superior, and claims to have sex with him to "improve his skills".
Kirakira (キラキラ)
Kirakira is a pink-haired student with an easygoing personality who joined Nayuta to escape the "boredom" of average life. She's a fashionista, having made Nayuta's combat outfits herself. When the conflict turns lethal, she feels too scared to go on, but Kuma helps her find reason to keep fighting.
Her real surname is Shinomiya. Her real given name consists of four kanji characters with multiple possible readings, but in the English version, her given name is translated to Macaron.
Torataro (とらたろう)
Torataro is a runaway and dropout who co-founded Nayuta with Zappa. He is a skilled mechanic, having made all of his weapons himself. He sees Kuma as his rival, and squabbles with him over who is Nayuta's number-two, despite Kuma's indifference. Torataro also dislikes his current nickname and wants to drop it.
Medico (メディコ)
Medico is a nursing student from Nara who is unaware of the dystopian nature of Asougi city. She came in search of her father, a journalist who went to Asougi City to investigate and went missing. Nayuta saves her from an arbitrary arrest, and when she helps them in turn by treating Torataro's injuries, they accept her as a member.
Her real name is Minako Taisouji.
Antenna (アンテナ)
Antenna is Kirakira's best friend and classmate who never shows up to school. She is an electrical engineer and has a fascination with radio waves. Nayuta recruits her as their hacker, where she is in charge of intelligence, security, and lock-breaking. She claims to be driven by intellectual curiosity, and others find her 'weird' due to her social ineptitude.
Her real name is Eria Arecibo-Kouda.
Joker (ジョーカー)
Joker is a young boy with a slight and feminine build brought to Asougi from the countryside. While hunting at the Chemical Science Lab, Nayuta saves him from his fate of human experimentation as a "Body Donor", so he helps Nayuta with their activities to repay them for their kindness (as he sees it).
ALyCE (アリス)
While she appears to be a doll-like young woman with a childish and innocent personality, ALyCE is actually a lethal sniper. She and her older twin sister, YAMMy, were initially mercenaries hired by the Flattt clan. But after they are defeated, she joins Nayuta for protection.
Her appearance is modeled on Alice-chan, AliceSoft's mascot character.
Kikuchiyo (菊千代)
Kikuchiyo is the heiress to the Shinonome clan and an honor student at an all-girls' school. She inherits her family's mission to take down the Asougi authorities. Kikuchiyo specializes in using her katana as a fighter, but she is not involved in Shinonome's most criminal operations.
After fighting alongside Kuma to resolve an incident, she develops feelings for him. When she is ousted by her clan, she makes friends with Nayuta and joins them afterwards.
The name she uses when fighting is part of her real name, Kikuchiyo Mibu.
Murasaki (ムラサキ)
The leader of the Flattt clan. Unlike the leaders of other Anti-Aso clans, Murasaki stays away from fights, preferring to use his wits and manipulate others.
Shion (シオン)
Shion is the second leader of Flattt, Murasaki's equal, who carries herself in a provocative way. She finds Joker cute and preys upon him.
Shinazu (品須)
The Shinonome clan's initial second-in-command under Kikuchiyo (as well as a father figure to her). Believing that Kikuchiyo's attraction to Kuma is distracting her from her mission, Shinazu usurps her, causing a change in clan leadership.
Tsuina (終名)
Kikuchiyo's younger half-sister who spent several years in the Outside world beyond Asougi City, where she formed connections with the Kurohoro clan. Hardened by her childhood, she became bloodthirsty and violent. Unlike most of the Shinonome clan members, who fight using swords, she uses firearms. After Kikuchiyo is expelled from Shinonome, Tsuina installs herself as the new leader of the clan, merging them with the Kurohoro.
Hisamitsu (玖光)
Hisamitsu Yamamoto, of Asougi's founding family, is the Chairman of Asougi Heavy Industries, involved in their robotics program. He serves as a central antagonist. It is revealed that he is Zappa's cousin.
Mistress (ミストレス)
Mistress is the owner of the black-market general store for the Anti-Aso clans called VILE/VAN. She is an arms dealer with shady connections, organizing the clans with high-paying clients. Secretly, she is Hisamitsu's secretary under her real surname, Izumi. Her role is to run counterinsurgency operations by using information leaks and manipulation to influence clan activity.

== Development and release ==
Dohna Dohna was developed by AliceSoft. The scenario was written by Dice Korogashi, with character designs and illustrations by Gyokai. Kanikama provided super-deformed illustrations. The opening theme song, "Dohna Dohna no Uta" (ドーナドーナのうた, Dōnadōna no uta), was sung by Tsukino.

Prior to launch, AliceSoft released a free trial for download on Fanza Games on November 5, 2020. The package edition, download edition and deluxe edition of Dohna Dohna were released for Windows PC on November 27, 2020, with compatibility for Windows 8/10. The "Deluxe" edition of the game was bundled with a dakimakura cover, a CD copy of the original soundtrack, and a copy of Haru Urare, a small game considered to be Dohna Dohna's spiritual predecessor. Other merchandise such as telephone cards and pin badges were also included as purchase and pre-order bonuses.

To commemorate its release, music content from Dohna Dohna was added to rhythm-run action game Muse Dash globally in December 2020.

The English version, translated and published by Shiravune, was first released on October 29, 2021. Originally, this version was exclusively available on the digital game storefront Johren, but Dohna Dohna also became available on JAST USA, MangaGamer, and Kagura Games in English beginning on August 8, 2023.

== Reception ==
Reception

Review scores
Publication	Score
NookGaming	8/10
Tech-Gaming	7.8/10

On Getchu.com, a redistributor of visual novel and anime products, Dohna Dohna ranked as the second best selling bishōjo game for the month of its release. Deluxe edition of the game also ranked as the eighth best selling bishōjo game at the same period. According to Japanese magazine "BugBug", it was the best selling bishōjo game from November 16, 2020, to December 15, 2020.

Tadamoto Ōsawa, the editor-in-chief of "BugBug", praised Dohna Dohna for its visual effects, user interface and illustration. Ryo from Media Clip praised the background music and pop graphics, and wrote that they "make the game fun and cheerful."

Taiwanese publication 4Gamers was pleased with the handling of characters' flaws and motivations, which "grounded the story in a sense of realism," and praised the depiction of "the disappointing side of human nature." They also noted that there was depth to the "quite responsible" story.
