= Omotesandō Adventure =

- Box art for the PC-8001 cassette release
- Publisher: ASCII Corporation
- Platform: PC-8001
- Release: JP: March 1982
- Genre: Text adventure

Omotesandō Adventure (Note: Japanese: 表参道アドベンチャー, Hepburn: Omotesandō Adobenchā) is a 1982 text adventure video game. The game is about being a developer for a microcomputer magazine that is set to infiltrate the headquarters of Monthly ASCII magazine to sabotage the company. The game was made for Japanese personal computers such as the PC-8001 and only features text against a black background. Commands are input through a keyboard, such as directions to move and actions such as "Open Door" to progress.

Omotesandō Adventure is the first Japanese adventure game. It was made during a period in the early 1980s when Japanese magazines began publishing articles about adventure games developed outside of Japan. The game was included in an issue of Monthly ASCII that was first published in March 1982 and later made available as a physical release. A sequel, Minami Aoyama Adventure, was released the following year.

Game journalist Koji Fukuyama described the release of Omotesandō Adventure as being a turning point in the history of Japanese adventure games. In the latter half of 1982, other Japanese magazines began to feature adventure games that would slowly spread throughout Japan. Academic Yuhsuke Koyama said that while role-playing and adventure games would only become commonplace in Japan after later games were released commercially on home consoles such as the Family Computer.

== Gameplay ==
Gameplay in Omotesandō Adventure is in English and has user enter prompts for action and moving in different locations in the game.

Omotesandō Adventure features white text against a black background. It is a text adventure game which is played by typing text on a keyboard. It requires players to type in English while allowing shortcuts for some commands, such as "N" for "North" and "D" for "Down". Other commands are done by combining verbs and nouns as text in English, such as "Open Door".

In Omotesandō Adventure, the player is an editor at a struggling microcomputer magazine. They set off to infiltrate the headquarters of the now-dominant Monthly ASCII magazine and carry out sabotage to bring it down. Along the way, the player reaches obstacles to overcome, such as the elevator being out of service in the building, which requires the player to take the stairs.

== Background and development ==
The launch of the personal computer (PC) industry was in 1978 in Japan, about a year after the Apple II was released in the United States. Academic Yuhsuke Koyama wrote in his book History of the Japanese Video Game Industry that the Japanese PC game market did not begin in tandem with its American counterpart. Most games imported from the United States to Japan were action games. In contrast, other PC-based genres such as adventure games and role-playing video games (RPGs) arrived only after their American release.

Between 1981 and 1982, culture magazines like Hot-Dog Press and Popeye first introduced imported adventure games to Japan. They were featured briefly in articles about popular games in the United States, with brief descriptions of their adventure games. Other magazines followed, which included the "Ah!Ski" section in the April 1982 issue of Monthly ASCII which was published in March 1982. This magazine included Omotesandō Adventure was released as a supplement.

The game was developed in Adven-80, an adventure game development program made by Peter S. Scargill. The title Omotesandō Adventure originates from Omotesandō, the location where the ASCII editorial department was located in 1982.

== Release and reception ==
The article on adventure games in ASCII spanned six pages, with four dedicated to the program Omotesandō Adventure in machine code, which had to be manually entered. The magazine also included ways to play the game on the MZ-80K/C and MZ-80B series of MZ-80 computers.

A physical was later made available for release on cassette tape was released for PC-8001 computers.

A year after the release of Omotesandō Adventure, a sequel titled Minami Aoyama Adventure was released. In this game, the player sneaks into the residence of Gunichiro Nishizaki, the founder of the ASCII Corporation, to also commit another act of sabotage. In contrast to the other game, the sequel features color and a map feature.

In a retrospective of the game in 2004, a writer for ASCII said that many players would give up on Omotesandō Adventure and Minami Aoyama Adventure due to their cryptic nature, which offers no hints on how to progress. They said the game would look like avant-garde art compared to contemporary games of the period that had video and graphics.

== Legacy ==
Game journalist Koji Fukuyama described the release of Omotesandō Adventure as being a turning point in the history of Japanese adventure games. In the latter half of 1982, other Japanese magazines began to feature adventure games that would slowly spread throughout Japan.

Koyama added that RPGs and adventure games only became commonplace in Japan after they were released commercially on home consoles such as the Family Computer.

== See also ==
- 1982 in video games
- List of PC-88 games
