= Onryō Senki =

1988 video game

- PC-8801 game cover
- Developer: Studio Wing
- Platforms: PC-8801, MSX2, PC-9801, PC Engine CD-ROM²
- Release: PC-8801: JP: 1988; PC Engine CD-ROM²: JP: September 22, 1995
- Genre: Adventure game

Onryō Senki (Note: Japanese: 怨霊戦記; lit. 'Vengeful Spirits Chronicle') is a 1988 horror-themed adventure game developed by Studio Wing. It was one of their many games the development group made involving occult and supernatural themes.

The game involves the player controlling Hiroyuki Kitahara, who explores the town after being attacked by demons when on a walk. After his hospital insists dogs had attacked him and that he was in shock, he investigates the town day and night to find the truth. The game features static images and a text-based menu selection for investigating and navigating the town.

Originally released for the PC-8801 in 1988, it was later released to other popular Japanese home computers of the era, such as the MSX2 and PC-9801 and later in 1995 to the PC Engine CD-ROM² as Shin Onryō Senki. The game received a mixed response from reviewers of Famicom Tsūshin in 1995 for its old-fashioned menu-based gameplay while retrospective reviews from 4gamer.net and PC Gamer complimented the game's atmosphere and visual style.

== Gameplay ==
Onryō Senki is a horror-themed adventure game.

The player controls the game through simple commands from a text-based sidebar. On the screen, static pictures of scenes are featured. The gameplay is split between day cycles for gathering information and evidence, while late-night hours are for acting on the information acquired. At night, Kitahara can ward off evil spirits using special mantras and mudras through chants and hand gestures.

== Plot ==
Onryō Senki features Hiroyuki Kitahara, a programmer who works for a large national bank in the fictional city of Miyadera. When out on a moonlit night, Kitahara gets attacked by demons. The hospital insists that stray dogs had attacked him, and the idea of demons attacking him was from shock. This leads Kitahara to gather more evidence and uncover the truth behind his supernatural encounter.

Kitahara investigates the city and the related phenomena he encountered by creating a program from his computer terminal at home. This gives him a steady stream of reports about people who were officially attacked by "dogs" and "monkeys" as well as a map showing where supposed supernatural hotspots are.

== Development and release ==
Onryō Senki was developed by Studio Wing, a software company that has produced numerous adventure games which were themed around the occult and people with psychic powers. In their early history, they developed games for the MSX and later developed games for the PC-8801 and PC-9801.

A port titled Shin Onryō Senki (Note: 真復讐霊戦記; lit. 'True Vengeance Spirit War Chronicles') was developed for the PC-Engine's CD-ROM add-on device, the PC Engine CD-ROM². The port was developed by Studio Wing in 1995. By June 19, 1995, it was 80% complete. In interviews with PC Engine Fan, the development team claimed their office at the time of the original game was at the back of a cemetery and that the team themselves experienced supernatural events or even claimed to have paranormal abilities.

Onryō Senki was first released for the PC-8801 in 1988. On its initial release, the game was packaged with protective ofuda, which were designed to ward off evil spirits.

It was later ported to the MSX2 and PC-9801. The PC-9801 version allows for the use of a computer mouse for controlling the game. Shin Onryō Senki was released for the PC Engine CD-ROM² on September 22, 1995. In the 2000s, D4 Enterprise distributed Onryō Senki on the retro game distribution service Project EGG.

== Reception ==
Shin Onryō Senki reception

Review score
Publication	Score
Famitsu	6/10, 5/10, 7/10, 6/10

Reviewing Shin Onryō Senki for the PC Engine CD-ROM², the four reviewers in Famicom Tsūshin said that in an era where sound novel-styled games are everywhere, the menu-selection-based gameplay felt old-fashioned and tedious. The reviewers wrote that the game often had them brute-forcing their way to a solution and that it was not user-friendly, as the voiced audio did not always match the text and that it was not always obvious when the player could move from one area to another. While two reviewers wrote that they liked the game's story, another reviewer said they wished it was a bit more exciting.

Retrospective critics complimented Onryō-Senki for its use of color and dithering to blend images in with the backgrounds.

From retrospective reviews of the original release, reviewers in PC Gamer and 4gamer.net complimented the unique and atmosphere of the original game. Kerry Brunskill of PC Gamer highlighted that ghosts appearing in night scenes at random, only to flicker silently made the game effective, and the lack of jump scares were the highlights.

In retrospective reviews of the original release, a reviewer from 4gamer.net highlighted the featured backgrounds which were made from edited photos and use only four colors. While using a limited palette was not unusual at the time, the 4gamer.net reviewer said this design hybrid made Onryō Senki have a powerful impact through its unique atmosphere. Brunskill, the artwork heavily dithered backgrounds made "a striking combination of a midnight blue and stark black—detailed enough to resemble a specific place or scene, but always dreamlike and indistinct." The reviewer on 4gamer.net said the game could "be considered the culmination of the company's work." Brunskill of PC Gamer said the game surpassed Silent Hill (1999), Fatal Frame (2001) and Devotion (2019) in terms of ratcheting up supernatural tension.

== See also ==
- List of PC-88 games
- Video games in Japan
