= Nobunaga's Ambition (video game) =

1986 video game

- PC-98 cover art
- Developer: Koei
- Publisher: Koei
- Composer: Yoko Kanno
- Series: Nobunaga's Ambition
- Platforms: MSX, NEC PC-8801, NEC PC-9801, NES, Game Boy, Genesis, SNES, MS-DOS, Mac OS, Amiga, 3DO, PC Engine Super CD-ROM²
- Release: PC: JP: October 1986; NA: 1988; Famicom: JP: March 18, 1988; NES: NA: June 1989; MSX: JP: 1987; SNES: JP: August 5, 1993; NA: December 1993; Genesis: JP: September 15, 1993; NA: 1993
- Genre: Turn-based strategy
- Mode: Multiplayer

Nobunaga's Ambition (Note: Japanese: 信長の野望・全国版, Hepburn: Nobunaga no Yabō: Zenkokuban) is a 1986 strategy video game developed and published by Koei. It was released for several platforms such as IBM PC compatibles, Amiga, Nintendo Entertainment System, Super NES, and Sega Genesis. A part of Koei's "Historical Simulation" line of titles, it is focused in the Sengoku period of the history of Japan. It is the second game in the Nobunaga's Ambition series and the first Nobunaga's Ambition title to be released in English. The player has the objective of unifying Japan as Oda Nobunaga or as any of the other daimyos present in the game. Several revisions were made to the gameplay since the first game, as well as a 50-province mode which expanded the game's map to feature all of Japan.

Hamster Corporation released the NES version as part of their Console Archives series for the Nintendo Switch 2 and PlayStation 5 in March 2026. The SNES version was released for Virtual Console on April 27, 2009, for the Wii and September 4, 2014, for the Wii U in North America.

== Gameplay ==
MS-DOS screenshot

The player may choose from four campaign scenarios, including "Battle for the East" (beginning in 1560), "Daimyo Power Struggles" (1560), "Ambition Untamed" (1571), and "Road Towards Unification" (1582). In each scenario, the player must allocate resources to raise a capable military force, provide a productive economy to support both military and civilian expansion, and support the peasants in order to sustain their respect and loyalty. Gameplay is taken in turns, with each turn in the map view corresponding to a season, and each turn during battle corresponding to a day. The player may achieve victory through numerous means, among which are forcing the enemy to retreat, destroying the enemy command unit, outlasting an invading force, or prolonging battles until the opposing force has exhausted its supplies.

The player can make many choices during the campaign, such as, according to Evan Brooks of Computer Gaming World: "One may transfer soldiers between fiefs, go to war, increase taxes (which causes a decrease in peasant loyalty which may lead to rebellion), transfer rice or gold to another fief, raise the level of flood control (which decreases productivity), make a non-aggression pact or arrange a marriage, cultivate (which increases productivity, but decreases peasant loyalty), use a merchant (to buy/sell rice, borrow funds, or purchase weapons), recruit for the military (soldiers or ninja), train the army (which increases fighting efficiency), spy on a rival, expand a town (which increases taxes collected, but decreases peasant loyalty), give food/rice to peasants/soldiers (to raise morale), steal peasants from rival daimyos, allocate military strength, recuperate (even a daimyo can get sick), turn over a controlled fief to the computer for administration, or pass a turn (hint: when one has no idea of what to do, train the troops.)"

== Reception ==
In North America, the game was positively reviewed by Computer Gaming World, where reviewer Evan Brooks gave it four stars out of five. He introduced the game as "a detailed economic / diplomatic / political / military simulation of the unification of Japan in the Sixteenth Century." He praised the graphics for being "among the best that this reviewer has ever seen for the IBM" and the 5x10 hex map battles, and noted that it used role-playing game elements, including assigning various statistics to a selected persona, a time system where each turn represents a year, as the daimyo ages and eventually dies of old age, and a multiplayer option. He stated that he "thoroughly enjoyed Nobunaga's Ambition", concluded with a "Highly Recommended" rating, Compute! similarly praised the IBM PC version, calling it "one of the best strategic war games ever designed for a personal computer" and citing the game play, user interface, and documentation. In the May 1990 edition of Games International, Brian Walker called this program "one of the best strategy games around." He gave the game a perfect rating of 10 out of 10 for game play.

The console versions had a more lukewarm reception. Reviewing the SNES version, GamePro praised the control interface and combat system but opined that the game essentially offers nothing to set it apart from Koei's previous historical simulators. They rated the Genesis version similarly, saying that "Like all Koei games, Nobunaga has an easy-to-use but detailed menu-driven interface that activates a load of complex commands."
