= Kessen III =

2004 video game

- North American box art
- Developer: Koei
- Publisher: Koei
- Director: Kazuhiro Fujishige
- Designer: Osamu Mieda
- Series: Kessen
- Platforms: PlayStation 2, PlayStation Network
- Release: PlayStation 2: JP: December 22, 2004; NA: February 22, 2005; PAL: May 13, 2005; PlayStation Network: NA: August 20, 2013; PAL: January 30, 2013
- Genre: Real-time tactics
- Modes: Single-player, multiplayer

Kessen III is the third and final Kessen title by Koei for PlayStation 2. The game is based on the life of Oda Nobunaga.

== Historical background ==
The game's time frame is roughly between the years 1550 to 1590. Contrary to many stories and portrayals that depict him as a villain or demon, Nobunaga is depicted in a more virtuous and ultimately tragic light, making Kessen III rather unusual in relation to other video games based in the same era. It is a heavily fantasized and romanticized depiction of his life, although unlike games such as the Samurai Warriors series it goes into more specific historical details. For example, the existence of the Ashikaga shogunate and Nobunaga's relationship is covered herein but completely omitted from the Samurai Warriors games.

The game paints a positive picture on Nobunaga's life, and then enters a "what if" scenario showing what might have happened if he had survived the betrayal by Akechi Mitsuhide. It describes Nobunaga regaining his power base, and then defeating shogunate forces led by the Akechi Clan and other clans of Western Japan on the shores of Kyūshū, with Nobunaga presumably becoming the new leader.

Tokugawa Ieyasu is in this game, presented as Nobunaga's mild-mannered and dedicated ally, but is shown flying into a rage when he learns that Nobunaga survives his betrayal, believing that he was going to carry out Nobunaga's destiny. Toyotomi Hideyoshi is also shown, under the name of Hideyoshi Hashiba. His unlikely charisma inspires his troops after he is wrongly told of Nobunaga's death.

The game also allows battles against other notable daimyōs, such as Uesugi Kenshin and Takeda Shingen.

There is a certain level of inaccuracy, due not only to the fantasy element, but also due to the appearance of Miyamoto Musashi, who had not yet been born when Nobunaga committed seppuku.

== Gameplay mechanics ==
Kessen III refines the mechanics of the previous games even further while introducing new core elements. The flow of the game begins with the player selecting a mission from those available on the map. After being briefed on the mission's details, the player then selects which units to bring into the battle before issuing basic marching orders. During the battle itself, the player is in control of an individual unit and can switch between friendly units at any time, while the other units are controlled by artificial intelligence. Battle commences when friendly and enemy units encounter one another and unit health is measured by the number of troops remaining in the unit. Troops also have specific skills related to their particular type (cavalry, spearmen, ninja, etc.) and officers can learn powerful special skills and abilities such as defensive strategies or attack magic that can turn the tide of battle.

All officers have access to a special skill called "rampage". When used, the action zooms in around that officer, and the player enters a short, timed mini-battle against troops from an enemy unit. During a rampage, the player can earn bonus experience, gold, and restore lost troops to the unit by picking up the proper items dropped by defeated soldiers. After 100 soldiers are defeated, the enemy unit's officer appears, and if the player can defeat them, the officer under the player's control may receive even further bonuses.

Battles end when the primary objective has been achieved. These objectives may include wiping out all enemy units, destroying a specific target, escorting a unit to a particular location, or making an escape. Grades on performance in battle are given at the end of each stage, and are based on how many enemy officers were defeated, the number of friendly officers were kept in battle, and the effective use of troop skills. Better grades yield items that can be used to outfit friendly officers, or gold to buy such items from merchants between battles. Battles are typically lost when Nobunaga's unit is defeated, time runs out, or a special mission requirement could not be completed.

== Cinematics ==
The storyline of Kessen III is very detailed and makes frequent use of cinematic sequences rendered using both the game's own graphics engine and full motion video. These sequences are typically played at the start and end of each chapter, before and after battles, and during special events that take place during the course of a fight.

== Reception ==
Reception

Aggregate scores
Aggregator	Score
GameRankings	75.04%
Metacritic	73/100

Review scores
Publication	Score
Edge	7/10
Electronic Gaming Monthly	6.67/10
Game Informer	7.75/10
GamePro	4/5
GameRevolution	C+
GameSpot	7.4/10
GameZone	8.3/10
IGN	8/10
Official U.S. PlayStation Magazine	3/5
X-Play	3/5
The Sydney Morning Herald	3.5/5

Kessen III was met with positive to average reception upon release; GameRankings gave it a score of 75.04%, while Metacritic gave it 73 out of 100.

== See also ==
- Nobunaga's Ambition
