= Woody Poco =

1986 video game

- Cover art
- Developer: dB-SOFT
- Publisher: dB-SOFT
- Composer: Yasuhito Saito
- Platforms: Family Computer; MSX; NEC PC-8801; NEC PC-9801; FM-77AV; Sharp X1
- Release: PC-8801: JP: October 22, 1986; PC-9801 and Sharp X1: JP: 1986; Family Computer: JP: June 20, 1987; MSX and FM-77AV: JP: 1987
- Genres: 2D action platformer, action RPG
- Mode: Single-player

Woody Poco (うっでいぽこ) is a Japan-exclusive video game released for the Family Computer in addition to various other systems. It is a side-scrolling action role-playing game similar to Mystical Ninja.

== Summary ==
The player controls an old wooden figure named "Poco."

He is a hero who has lived in harmony with humans for many years. For Poco, the journey is to find the fairy who teaches people to get back to being friendly with wooden dolls. Enemies encountered through the game are strange creatures and bothersome old men. The player attacks by using his fists at them. Players can steal the items in the store. But after stealing, the player's appearance is changed to resemble that of a thief. Hotels and pawn shops can no longer admit the player for the remainder of the game after a theft has taken place.

The player can equip one hand with a weapon, and the other with a passive tool, such as a lamp for dark areas. The player can buy gear, sleep at hotels, gamble, steal, and bribe non-player characters. The player needs to eat to prevent hunger, with recharging health based on food level. It features an in-game clock, with day/night cycles and four seasons; the color changes to reflect the time of day and the season.

== Reception ==
Reception

Review score
Publication	Score
Biweekly Famicom Tsūshin	7/10, 8/10, 8/10, 8/10

A reviewer in the Japanese video game magazine Biweekly Famicom Tsūshin described the game as a top seller for personal computers.

In the Biweekly Famicom Tsūshin, the four reviewers complimented the cute and quality graphics of the game. One reviewer complimented the three-dimensional look of the graphics as innovative for gameplay while its controls took a while to get used to at first.
