= DB-SOFT =

Japanese software company

dB-SOFT Inc.
- Type: Joint-stock company
- Industry: Video games, Information technology
- Founded: May 2, 1980
- Founder: Sadayuki Furuya
- Defunct: 2001
- Fate: Merged into NetFarm Communications
- Successor: NetFarm Communications
- Headquarters: Sapporo, Hokkaido, Japan

dB-SOFT Inc. (デービーソフト株式会社) was a Japanese software development company that was in business from 1980 to 2003 based in Sapporo, Hokkaido. They started as a video game developer, releasing titles for various home computer platforms (including the Family Computer), but subsequently left the gaming business to focus solely on programming software and tools as they entered the 1990s.

== History ==
The company was founded on May 2, 1980, under the name Computer Land Hokkaido, publishing video games for various home computers under the "7 Turkey" brand name. In 1984, they officially changed their name to dB-SOFT, taking their new name from the decibel (dB) unit.

Some of the company's most commercially successful video games include Flappy (which has been released in over 20 versions) and Woody Poco. dB-SOFT also published two pornographic games under the Macadamia Soft imprint: Macadam and 177 (the latter was banned from retail by the National Diet due to its controversial premise in which the player's objective is to pursue and rape a fleeing woman). In addition to gaming software, dB-SOFT also produced programming tools such as dB-BASIC (a BASIC compiler), P1.EXE (a word processor) and HOTALL (a web designing tool).

On August 1, 2001, dB-SOFT ceased operation after being merged into NetFarm Communications (a company founded by Reiko Furuya, Sadayaki Furuya's wife). Their former office building was sold off in 2002.

== Softography ==
Video games developed and published by dB-SOFT
Title	NEC				Sharp			ASCII		Nintendo	Fujitsu		Hitachi	Refs
Title	PC-6001	PC-8000	PC-88	PC-98	MZ	X1	X68000	MSX	MSX2	Famicom	FM-7	FM77AV	S1	Refs
Flappy	1983	—	1983	—	1984	1983	—	1984	—	1985	1984	—	1985	
Volguard	1985	—	1984	—	1984	1984	—	1985	—	—	—	—	1984	
Zunō Senkan Galg	—	—	—	—	—	—	—	—	—	1985	—	—	—	
Laptick	—	1985	1985	—	—	1985	—	—	—	—	—	1986	—	
Volguard II	—	—	—	—	—	—	—	—	—	1985	—	—	—	
Cross Blaim	—	—	—	—	—	—	—	1986	—	—	—	—	—	
Laptick'2	—	—	—	—	—	—	—	1985	—	—	—	—	—	
LayLa	—	—	—	—	—	—	—	—	—	1986	—	—	—	
Woody Poco	—	—	1986	1986	—	1986	—	—	1987	1987	—	1987	—	
Tetsudō-ō	—	—	—	—	—	—	—	—	—	1987	—	—	—	
Produce	—	—	1987	1987	—	1987	—	—	—	—	—	—	—	
Konyamo Asanmade Powerful Mahjong	—	—	1988	1988	—	1988	—	—	—	—	—	—	—	
Konyamo Asanmade Powerful Mahjong 2	—	—	1989	1989	—	—	1989	—	1989	—	—	—	—	
The Story of Melroon	—	—	1989	1989	—	—	—	—	—	—	—	—	—	
