= Nobunaga's Ambition =

Video game series

- PC-98 cover of the second game
- Genres: Wargame, turn-based strategy, tactical role-playing
- Developers: Koei; Kou Shibusawa
- Publishers: Koei; Koei Tecmo
- Creator: Kou Shibusawa
- Platforms: Platforms: MSX; PC-88; PC-98; NES; Super NES; Game Boy; Game Boy Color; Game Boy Advance; Genesis; MS-DOS; Mac; Amiga; 3DO; PC Engine Super CD-ROM²; WonderSwan; Windows; Nintendo DS; Nintendo 3DS; Nintendo Switch; Nintendo Switch 2; Wii; Wii U; PlayStation 2; PlayStation 3; PlayStation 4; PlayStation 5; PlayStation Portable; PlayStation Vita; Xbox; Xbox 360; FM Towns
- First release: Nobunaga no Yabō; March 1983
- Latest release: Nobunaga's Ambition: Awakening; July 20, 2022

Nobunaga's Ambition (信長の野望, Nobunaga no Yabō) is a series of turn-based grand strategy role-playing simulation video games developed and published by Koei (now Koei Tecmo). The original game was one of the first in its genre, being released in March 1983 in Japan. Nobunaga's Ambition takes place during the Sengoku period of feudal Japan. The player is tasked with achieving the ultimate goal of warlord Oda Nobunaga: the conquest and unification of Japan. Selecting Oda Nobunaga is optional, however, as the player is also able to choose from a variety of other regional daimyōs of the time.

Games in the series have been released for Windows, MS-DOS, the Nintendo Entertainment System, Game Boy, Genesis, 3DO, Super NES, PlayStation, Saturn, PlayStation 2, PlayStation 3, Xbox 360, Wii, PlayStation Portable, PlayStation Vita, PlayStation 4, PlayStation 5, Nintendo Switch, Switch 2, Mac, MSX, and Amiga. As of March 2018, the series has shipped more than 10 million copies worldwide.

== Gameplay ==
The player may choose from four campaign scenarios, including "Battle for the East" (beginning in 1560), "Daimyo Power Struggles" (1560), "Ambition Untamed" (1571), and "Road Towards Unification" (1582). In each scenario, the player must allocate resources to raise a capable military force, provide a productive economy to support both military and civilian expansion, and support the peasants in order to sustain their respect and loyalty. Gameplay is taken in turns, with each turn in the map view corresponding to a season, and each turn during battle corresponding to a day. The player may achieve victory through numerous means, among which are forcing the enemy to retreat, destroying the enemy command unit, outlasting an invading force, or prolonging battle until the opposing force has exhausted its supplies.

The player can make many choices during the campaign. According to Evan Brooks of Computer Gaming World:

One may transfer soldiers between fiefs, go to war, increase taxes (which causes a decrease in peasant loyalty which may lead to rebellion), transfer rice or gold to another fief, raise the level of flood control (which decreases productivity), make a non-aggression pact or arrange a marriage, cultivate (which increases productivity, but decreases peasant loyalty), use a merchant (to buy/sell rice, borrow funds, or purchase weapons), recruit for the military (soldiers or ninja), train the army (which increases fighting efficiency), spy on a rival, expand a town (which increases taxes collected, but decreases peasant loyalty), give food/rice to peasants/soldiers (to raise morale), steal peasants from rival daimyos, allocate military strength, recuperate (even a daimyo can get sick), turn over a controlled fief to the computer for administration, or pass a turn.

== Games ==
Release timeline
1983	Nobunaga no Yabō
1984
1985
1986	Nobunaga's Ambition
1987
1988	Nobunaga's Ambition II
1989
1990	Nobunaga's Ambition: Lord of Darkness
1991
1992	Nobunaga no Yabō: Haōden
1993
1994	Nobunaga no Yabō: Tenshōki
1995
1996
1997	Nobunaga no Yabō: Shōseiroku
1998
1999	Nobunaga no Yabō: Reppūden
2000
2001	Nobunaga no Yabō: Ranseiki
2002	Nobunaga no Yabō: Sōtenroku
2003	Nobunaga's Ambition: Rise to Power
2004
2005	Nobunaga's Ambition: Iron Triangle
2006
2007
2008
2009	Nobunaga no Yabō: Tendō
2010
2011
2012	Pokémon Conquest
2013	Nobunaga's Ambition: Sphere of Influence
2014
2015
2016
2017	Nobunaga's Ambition: Taishi
2018
2019
2020
2021
2022	Nobunaga's Ambition: Awakening

- Nobunaga no Yabō (信長の野望, "Nobunaga's Ambition") is the first title in the series, released in March 1983. Written entirely in BASIC, it was compatible with a wide range of Japanese PCs. It has no subtitles. A remake of this game titled Nobunaga no Yabō Returns (信長の野望 リターンズ, Nobunaga's Ambition Returns) was released in 1995 for Microsoft Windows 3.1, Sega Saturn, and PlayStation. An updated version of this for Windows 95 was released in 1996.
- Nobunaga's Ambition (信長の野望・全国版, Nobunaga no Yabō: Zenkokuban; lit. Nobunaga's Ambition: Country-Wide Edition) is the second title in the series and the first to be released outside Japan. It was released in September 1986 for the PC-88SR, and then quickly ported to various Japanese PCs. A 50-province mode covering all of Japan was added, as well as revisions to graphics and gameplay. Releases for the Nintendo Entertainment System (NES), Super Nintendo Entertainment System (SNES), Sega Genesis, TurboGrafx-16, PlayStation, mobile phones, Windows, and iOS were made subsequently. The U.S. NES, Genesis, and SNES releases were titled Nobunaga's Ambition; the SNES version was released for Virtual Console on April 27, 2009, for the Wii and September 4, 2014, for the Wii U in North America.
- Nobunaga's Ambition II (信長の野望・戦国群雄伝, Nobunaga no Yabō: Sengoku Gun'yūden; lit. Nobunaga's Ambition: Tales of the Sengoku Warlords) is the third title in the series, released December 1988 for PC-88SR, then quickly ported for various Japanese PCs. Taking after the Romance of the Three Kingdoms series, this game introduces the concept of "generals" to this series. The Tōhoku and Kyūshū areas were removed. Releases for NES, PlayStation, Saturn, MS-DOS, and mobile phones were made subsequently. The U.S. Nintendo Entertainment System release was titled Nobunaga's Ambition II.
- Nobunaga's Ambition: Lord of Darkness (信長の野望・武将風雲録, Nobunaga no Yabō: Bushō Fūunroku; lit. Nobunaga's Ambition: Records of the Generals) is the fourth title in the series, released December 1990 for PC-98, then quickly ported for various Japanese PCs (this was the last title in the series supported on 8-bit PCs). The scope was once again expanded to all of Japan, and technology, culture, and tea ceremony mechanics were introduced. Releases for NES, SNES, Genesis, PlayStation, Windows, and mobile phones were made subsequently. The North American SNES release was given the subtitle of Lord of Darkness.
- Nobunaga no Yabō: Haōden (信長の野望・覇王伝, lit. Nobunaga's Ambition: Tales of the Conquerors) is the fifth title in the series, released December 1992 for PC-98, then quickly ported for various Japanese PCs. This is the first game with an expansion pack. Battles were changed from taking provinces to taking castles. Releases for SNES, Genesis, Sega CD, 3DO, Mac OS, PlayStation, mobile phones, and Windows were made subsequently.
- Nobunaga no Yabō: Tenshōki (信長の野望・天翔記, lit. Nobunaga's Ambition: Chronicles of the Ascension) is the sixth title in the series, released December 1994 for PC-98 (the last of the series produced for MS-DOS variants), with ports for FM Towns, DOS/V, Windows, and Macintosh available later. Commands were executed based on units of power. Releases for SNES, PlayStation, Sega Saturn, PlayStation Portable, and mobile phones were made subsequently.
- Nobunaga no Yabō: Shōseiroku (信長の野望・将星録, lit. Nobunaga's Ambition: Records of the Star Generals) is the seventh title in the series, released March 1997 for Windows 95. This game introduces a new map, portraying the entire country on a grid. Releases for Macintosh, PlayStation, Sega Saturn, Dreamcast, PlayStation Portable, and mobile phones were made subsequently.
- Nobunaga no Yabō: Reppūden (信長の野望・烈風伝, lit. Nobunaga's Ambition: Tales of the Storms) is the eighth title in the series, released in February 1999 for Windows 95, with ports for Macintosh, PlayStation, Dreamcast, and PlayStation Portable made later.
- Nobunaga no Yabō: Ranseiki (信長の野望・嵐世記, lit. Nobunaga's Ambition: Chronicles of Turbulent Times) is the ninth title in the series, released in February 2001 for Windows 98. This game returned to province-taking battles, and the a system of varying powers was introduced. Ports for PlayStation 2, Xbox and PlayStation Portable were made later.
- Nobunaga no Yabō: Sōtenroku (信長の野望・蒼天録, lit. Nobunaga's Ambition: Records of the Blue Skies) is the tenth title in the series, released June 2002 for Windows 98. This game returned to castle-taking battles. It also became possible to play as a castle lord as well as a daimyō. Ports for PlayStation 2 and PlayStation Portable were made later.
- Nobunaga's Ambition: Rise to Power (信長の野望・天下創世, Nobunaga no Yabō: Tenka Sōsei; lit. Nobunaga's Ambition: The Creation of the World) is the eleventh title in the series, released September 2003 for Windows 98. This game introduced castle towns and unified castle sieges. The administration screens transitioned to full 3D. A port for PlayStation 2 was made later; this was released in the U.S. as Nobunaga's Ambition: Rise to Power on February 5, 2008.
- Nobunaga's Ambition: Iron Triangle (信長の野望・革新, Nobunaga no Yabō: Kakushin; lit. Nobunaga's Ambition: Innovation) is the twelfth title in the series, released June 2005 for Windows 98. The map and battles are in real-time, and the map is rendered in 3D. Ports for PlayStation 2 and Wii were made later; the former was released in the U.S. as Nobunaga's Ambition: Iron Triangle.
- Nobunaga no Yabō: Tendō (信長の野望・天道, lit. Nobunaga's Ambition: Roads of the Heavens) is the thirteenth title in the series, released September 2009 for Windows XP, with ports for PlayStation 3, Xbox 360 and PlayStation Vita made later.
- Nobunaga's Ambition: Sphere of Influence (信長の野望・創造, Nobunaga no Yabō: Sōzō; lit. Nobunaga's Ambition: Creation) is the fourteenth title in the series, released 12 December 2013 for PlayStation 3, PlayStation 4, and Windows. A PlayStation Vita version was released in May 2015. A western version of the game had been confirmed as of May 2015 under the title of Nobunaga's Ambition: Sphere of Influence, which was released on September 1, 2015, for North America and September 4, 2015, for Europe; It was released in PlayStation 3 as a digital release, in PlayStation 4 as a physical release, and PC via Steam. It has also been confirmed that the western release will contain both English and Japanese dub. The game was a launch title for the Nintendo Switch in Japan.
- Nobunaga's Ambition: Taishi (信長の野望・大志, Nobunaga no Yabō: Taishi; lit. Nobunaga's Ambition: Enormous Ambition) is the fifteenth title in the series and sequel to the 2013 game Nobunaga's Ambition: Sphere of Influence, and was released on November 30, 2017, for Microsoft Windows, PlayStation 4 and Nintendo Switch. First installment to be developed by newly founded division Kou Shibusawa.
- Nobunaga's Ambition: Awakening (信長の野望・新生, Nobunaga no Yabō: Shinsei) is the sixteenth title in the series. It was released on July 20, 2022, for Microsoft Windows, PlayStation 4 and Nintendo Switch, and July 20, 2023 for the US. Ports to the PlayStation 5 and Nintendo Switch 2 were released in 2025 as Complete Edition.

=== Mobile platforms ===
==== Game Boy ====
- Nobunaga's Ambition (信長の野望 ゲームボーイ版, Nobunaga no Yabō Game Boy Ban; lit. Nobunaga's Ambition: Game Boy Version) (1990), loosely based on Nobunaga no Yabō and Nobunaga's Ambition II.

==== WonderSwan ====
- Nobunaga no Yabō for Wonderswan (信長の野望 for ワンダースワン) (1999)

==== Game Boy Color ====
- Nobunaga no Yabō Game Boy Ban 2 (信長の野望 ゲームボーイ版2, lit. Nobunaga's Ambition Game Boy Version 2) (1999), primarily based on Nobunaga's Ambition.

==== Game Boy Advance ====
- Nobunaga no Yabō (信長の野望) (2001), a remake of Nobunaga's Ambition: Lord of Darkness.

==== Nintendo DS ====
- Nobunaga no Yabō DS (信長の野望DS) (2006), a remake of Nobunaga no Yabō: Reppūden.
- Kuni-tori Zunō Batoru: Nobunaga no Yabō (国盗り頭脳バトル 信長の野望, lit. Province-Taking Brain Battle: Nobunaga's Ambition) (2008), containing board game elements.
- Nobunaga no Yabō DS 2 (信長の野望DS2) (2008), a remake of Nobunaga's Ambition: Lord of Darkness.
- Pokémon Conquest (ポケモン＋ノブナガの野望, Pokemon Purasu Nobunaga no Yabō; Pokémon + Nobunaga's Ambition in Japan) (2012), a crossover with the Pokémon franchise.

==== PlayStation Portable ====
- Nobunaga no Yabō: Tenshōki (信長の野望・天翔記, lit. Nobunaga's Ambition: Chronicles of the Ascension)
- Nobunaga no Yabō: Shōseiroku (信長の野望・将星録, lit. Nobunaga's Ambition: Records of the Star Generals)
- Nobunaga no Yabō: Reppūden (信長の野望・烈風伝, lit. Nobunaga's Ambition: Tales of the Storms)
- Nobunaga no Yabō: Ranseiki (信長の野望・嵐世記, lit. Nobunaga's Ambition: Chronicles of Turbulent Times)
- Nobunaga no Yabō: Sōtenroku (信長の野望・蒼天録, lit. Nobunaga's Ambition: Records of the Blue Skies)

==== PlayStation Vita ====
These were released in Asia (in traditional Chinese versions), with physical copies for both versions with and without power up kit, on top of the Japanese versions released.

- Nobunaga's Ambition: Tendou (信長の野望・天道) (2012)
- Nobunaga's Ambition: Souzou / Nobunaga no Yabou: Souzou (信長の野望・創造) (2014)
- Nobunaga's Ambition: Tenshouki with Power Up Kit HD Version / Nobunaga no Yabou: Tenshouki with Power Up Kit HD Version (信長の野望・天翔記 with パワーアップキット HD Version) (2015)
- Nobunaga's Ambition: Sphere of Influence English version was seen on various websites such as on Play Asia, but not released.
- Nobunaga's Ambition: Souzou Sengoku Risshiden (信長の野望・創造 戦国立志伝) (2016)

==== Nintendo 3DS ====
- Nobunaga no Yabō (信長の野望) (2013)
- Nobunaga no Yabō 2 (信長の野望2) (2015)

=== Online games ===
- Nobunaga no Yabō Internet (信長の野望Internet) (1998), an online battle simulation game for Windows.
- Nobunaga no Yabō Online (信長の野望Online) (2003), an MMORPG for PlayStation 2, Windows, PlayStation 3 and PlayStation 4.
- Nobunaga no Yabō (信長の野望) (2003), a blanket title for several mobile phone games.
- Hyakuman-nin no Nobunaga no Yabō (100万人の信長の野望, lit. Million-Man Nobunaga's Ambition) (2010), a social network game by Mobage.
- Samurai Cats (のぶニャがの野望, NobuNYAga no Yabō; lit. Nobunyaga's Ambition) (2011), a cat-themed browser-based online battle/raising simulation game.

== Reception ==
The Nobunaga's Ambition series has garnered several awards over the years. According to Koei's website, various releases in the series have won Log-In magazine's "BHS Prize", the "Minister of Post & Telecommunications Prize", Nikkei BP's 12th, 13th, and 14th annual "Best PC Software" awards, and CD-ROM Fan's "Fan of the Year 2001 Grand Prize".

In North America, where it was released five years after its Japanese release, critical reception was also positive. The game was positively reviewed by Computer Gaming World, where reviewer Evan Brooks gave it four stars out of five. He introduced the game as "a detailed economic / diplomatic / political / military simulation of the unification of Japan in the Sixteenth Century." He praised the graphics for being "among the best that this reviewer has ever seen for the IBM" and the 5x10 hex map battles, and noted that it used role-playing game elements, including assigning various statistics to a selected persona, a time system where each turn represents a year, as the daimyo ages and eventually dies of old age, and a multiplayer option. He stated that he "thoroughly enjoyed Nobunaga's Ambition", concluded with a "Highly Recommended" rating, Compute! similarly praised the IBM PC version, calling it "one of the best strategic war games ever designed for a personal computer" and citing the gameplay, user interface, and documentation. In the May 1990 edition of Games International, John Scott called this program "One of the best strategy games around." He gave the game a perfect rating of 10 out of 10 for gameplay.

The console versions had a more lukewarm reception. Reviewing the SNES version, GamePro praised the control interface and combat system but opined that the game essentially offers nothing to set it apart from Koei's previous historical simulators. The magazine rated the Genesis version similarly, saying that "Like all Koei games, Nobunaga has an easy-to-use but detailed menu-driven interface that activates a load of complex commands."

In 1996, Next Generation listed the series collectively as number 34 on their "Top 100 Games of All Time", commenting that, "Lead designer Shou Kibasawa is a tactical genius who realizes that domestic and military strategies are interconnected, and that fielding armies can only be accomplished after building an infrastructure to support them. As a result, Nobunaga's Ambition boasts a level of strategic complexity few other series can come close to matching."

== See also ==
- Bandit Kings of Ancient China
- Kessen III
- Gihren's Greed
- Romance of the Three Kingdoms (video game series)
