= Nobunaga's Ambition II =

1988 video game

- Developer: Koei
- Publisher: Koei
- Platforms: PC-88, PC-98, Sharp X1, FM-7, X68000, FM Towns, DOS, Nintendo Entertainment System, Game Boy Color, PlayStation, Sega Saturn
- Release: 1988
- Genre: Strategy
- Modes: Single-player, multiplayer

Nobunaga's Ambition II, released in Japan as Nobunaga's Ambition: Sengoku Gunyuuden (Note: Japanese: 信長の野望・戦国群雄伝, Hepburn: Nobunaga no Yabō Sengoku Gunyūden), is a 1988 strategy video game developed and published by Koei. It was released for several platforms such as IBM PC compatibles, Nintendo Entertainment System, PlayStation and Sega Saturn. It is the third game in the Nobunaga's Ambition series.

Hamster Corporation released the NES version as part of their Console Archives series for the Nintendo Switch 2 and PlayStation 5 in September 2026.

== Gameplay ==
Taking after the Romance of the Three Kingdoms series, this game introduces the concept of "generals" to this series. The Tōhoku and Kyūshū areas were removed. The player must allocate resources to raise a capable military force, provide a productive economy to support both military and civilian expansion, and support the peasants in order to sustain their respect and loyalty. Gameplay is taken in turns, with each turn in the map view corresponding to a season, and each turn during battle corresponding to a day. The player may achieve victory through numerous means, among which are forcing the enemy to retreat, destroying the enemy command unit, outlasting an invading force, or prolonging battles until the opposing force has exhausted its supplies.

== Reception ==
Computer Gaming World rated the game 4 stars out of 5, praising its improved enemy artificial intelligence and graphics. Brian Walker of Strategy Plus called the game a must-buy for strategy fans, praising its immaculate presentation and engaging gameplay.
