= Dynamite Bowl =

1987 video game

- Famicom cover art
- Developer(s): Softvision
- Publisher(s): Toshiba-EMI
- Composer(s): Keiichi Maruyama
- Platform(s): MSX, Famicom, NEC PC-8801
- Release: Famicom: JP: May 24, 1987; NEC PC-8801: JP: October 1987
- Genre(s): Sports
- Mode(s): Single-player, multiplayer

Dynamite Bowl (ダイナマイトボウル, Dainamaito Bōru) is a 1987 video game that simulates the traditional game of bowling. The MSX version was released for both the MSX-1 and the MSX-2 generations of the computer.

Up to five players can play on any of the 30 bowling lanes available; simulating the concept of being in a bowling league. Players can change their lane positioning, determine how strong the throw is, and even make the ball go through various curves (or even through a straight ball into the pins). Each player character can be either male or female with options for bowling ball weights ranging from 7 pounds or 3.2 kilograms to 15 pounds or 6.8 kilograms.
