= Flappy =

1983 puzzle video game

- Developer: dB-SOFT
- Publisher: dB-SOFT
- Platforms: Famicom, FM-7, Hitachi S1, IBM JX, MSX, PC-6001mkII, PC-8001mkII, PC-88, PC-98 Sharp MZ-800, Sharp MZ-1500, Sharp X1
- Release: Famicom: JP: June 14, 1985; FM-7: JP: 1984; MSX: JP: 1984; PC-6001: JP: 1984; PC-8000: JP: 1984; PC-88: JP: 1983; Sharp MZ: JP: 1984; Sharp X1: JP: 1983
- Genre: Puzzle
- Mode: Single-player

Flappy (フラッピー, Furappī) is a puzzle video game released in 1983 by dB-SOFT in the same vein as the Eggerland series and Sokoban that is obscure outside Japan. It stars Flappy, a somewhat mole-like character who must complete each level by pushing a blue stone from its starting place to the blue tile destination.

Flappy first appeared on the Sharp X1 home computer in 1983. This debut was soon followed by conversions to a number of popular Japanese computers in the early 1980s, including the NEC's line of PCs and the Fujitsu FM series. Ports for the MSX computer line and the Family Computer were released in 1985. dB-SOFT produced a sequel with more difficult puzzles called King Flappy for the benefit of anyone who managed to clear the original 200 levels (or "sides" or "scenes" as the game calls them). A Nintendo Game Boy port was released exclusively in Japan in 1990 and was published by Victor Musical Industries.

== Plot ==
The beautiful planet of Blue Star, home-planet to a young boy named Flappy, is invaded by Dark Emperor Ngalo-Ngolo. The proud inhabitants of Blue Star, wanting neither war nor the invasion, self-destruct along with the planet on a path of self-determination. Flappy, however, is boarded onto an escape capsule headed for neighboring Planet Seviras by his father and so survives. From his capsule he sees fragments of the exploded Blue Star rain down incessantly on Planet Seviras.

Wandering aimlessly about Planet Seviras, Flappy reaches an oasis where he suddenly hears a voice from the sky saying, 'Gather up the fragments of Blue Star, the Blue Stones, to this Blue Area. When all of them have been gathered...' Flappy, believing a miracle has just occurred, begins on a journey to gather all the Blue Stones.

== Gameplay ==
Gravity, gaps in the floors, and wandering enemies stand in the way of Flappy reaching his goal. Flappy can pick up and throw sleeping mushrooms at the enemies to knock them out for a while, or drop stones on them to crush them permanently. There are, however, many obstacles along the way: brick walls players must work their way around, brown stones which players can crush but which can also crush them if they fall on them, holes or dead angles in which the blue stone becomes irretrievable if it falls into them, and moving enemies. The game features two enemies: Unicorns and Ebira. Unicorns are green creatures that move in mostly-repetitive horizontal patterns. Ebira are red crab-like enemies (the word "ebi" is a Japanese term for shellfish) that relentlessly chase Flappy both horizontally and vertically. Ebira tend to mimic Flappy's movements, so Flappy must be careful to avoid being charged by a persistent Ebira.

== Ports ==
- Sharp X1 ・PC-88 (1983)
- FM-7 ・MSX ・PC-6001 ・PC-8000 ・Sharp MZ-80K/700/800/1500 (1984)
- Family Computer (1985)

== Legacy ==
=== Sequels ===
- King Flappy, X1 ・PC-8801mkIISR ・PC-8001mkIISR (1985)
- Flappy 2: The resurrection of Blue Star, X68000 (1989)
- Flappy Special, Game Boy (1990)
- Flappy for Windows, Microsoft Windows (1995)
- FLAPPY95, Microsoft Windows (1996)
- Flappy World, Microsoft Windows (2001)

=== Clones ===
- Flappy, PMD 85 (1987)
- Flappy, Atari 8-bit computers (1988)
- Floppy, Apple II (198x)
- Beyond Floppy, Apple II (198x)
- Flappy, i-mode (2004)
- Flappy, Yahoo! Mobile (2005)
- Flappy, Virtual Console (2007; emulation of the Famicom port)
- Flappy, Java (2014; clone of the Sharp MZ-800 port)
- Tlappy, Android (2017; clone of the Sharp MZ-800 port)
