= Rance (series) =

- The cover of the first game of the Rance series, Rance – Quest for Hikari – featuring the character Tomato Purée
- Genre: Role-playing game
- Developer: AliceSoft
- Publisher: AliceSoft
- Platforms: PC-8800 series, PC-9800 series, X68000 series, FM Towns series, Microsoft Windows
- First release: Rance – The Quest For Hikari – 15 July 1989
- Latest release: Rance X – Showdown – 23 February 2018
- Spin-offs: Brutal King Rance

Rance is an eroge role-playing video-game series created, developed, and published by AliceSoft. It is the longest-running erotic video game series in history, with nearly 30 years between the first game and the conclusion of the series. The first installment, Rance: Quest for Hikari, was released in 1989, while the last main-series game, Rance X: Showdown, was released in 2018.

The Rance series follows the titular character, Rance, as he saves a number of kingdoms, defeats demon invaders, and causes mischief in the in-game world, known as "The Continent". He has appeared in most of the main series games as the playable character, accompanied by his loyal slave, Sill Plain. The series consists of ten main titles, along with several spin-off games. In addition, the first three games have been remade, titled Rance 01: Quest for Hikari, Rance 02: The Rebellious Maidens, and Rance 03: The Fall of Leazas respectively.

In 2008, along with many other early AliceSoft titles, all of the early Rance games up to Brutal King Rance were officially re-released as freeware titles. The Japanese release of Rance 02: The Rebellious Maidens was also officially re-released as freeware in 2023.

Most of the games have been officially localized and released in the west by MangaGamer starting with Rance 5D and VI in 2016. The latest English release is Sengoku Rance (RanceVII) Steam edition, released in October 2026.

== Games ==
The Rance series consists of ten main entries, starting with Rance: Quest for Hikari in 1989, and ending with Rance X: Showdown in 2018. There are also two short side story games, Rance 4.1 and Rance 4.2. Every game takes place in the same world, and events from each entry carry over into later ones; despite that, most of the games' stories are self-contained.

Brutal King Rance released after Rance 4.2, and served as a glimpse into the series' future. It is a spin-off that compiles the many ideas that the series producers had at the time, all into one large game. These ideas were later built upon in the games that came out after it, starting with Rance VI.

Rance titles by release date
1989	Rance: Quest for Hikari
1990	Rance II: The Rebellious Maidens
1991	Rance III: Fall of Leazas
1992
1993	Rance IV: Legacy of the Sect
1994
1995	Rance 4.1: Save the Medicine Plant!
1995	Rance 4.2: Angel Army
1996	Brutal King Rance
1997
1998
1999
2000
2001
2002	Rance 5D: The Lonely Girl
2003
2004	Rance VI: Collapse of Zeth
2005
2006	Sengoku Rance
2007
2008
2009	Rance 02: The Rebellious Maidens
2010
2011	Rance Quest
2012	Rance Quest Magnum
2013	Rance 01: Quest for Hikari
2014	Rance IX: The Helmanian Revolution
2015	Rance 03: Fall of Leazas
2016
2017
2018	Rance X: Showdown

=== Rance: Quest for Hikari ===
Rance, an adventurer working with the Keith Guild, accepts a mission to find and rescue the missing daughter of a wealthy family. Rance travels to the Kingdom of Leazas and investigates the castle town, while Sill investigates at the all-girls school, Paris Academy, where the kidnapped girl attended. This was the first game made under the AliceSoft brand, and the beginning of the Rance series. It was initially released for the PC-9800 series of computers, and was later ported to PC-8800, Sharp X68000, MSX 2 and 2+, FM TOWNS, PC88VA, and Windows 95.

==== Rance 01: Quest for Hikari ====
Rance 01: Quest for Hikari, released for Windows in 2013, supersedes the original game in canon. The game features a new casino-inspired gameplay system and massively improves upon the content from the original game, while retaining the same overall story. This remake was later adapted into a hentai OVA series. The game was officially released in English by MangaGamer in 2020, bundled with Rance 02: The Rebellious Maidens.

=== Rance II: The Rebellious Maidens ===
The town of Custom, a member of the Free Cities, is suddenly entombed underground by the Four Mages who were tasked to guard the town by Ragishss Cryhausen, the city's former guardian. Rance sets out with Sill to defeat them, but soon learns that their minds were corrupted by the power of the rings that they wield. Rance sets out to prevent them from receiving the magic power the rings grant. It was released in 1990 on the same computer systems as the first Rance game.

==== Rance 02: The Rebellious Maidens ====
Rance 02: The Rebellious Maidens is a remaster the original game, released for Windows in 2009. The original release of Rance 02 only updated the graphics and engine, but the later release, Rance 02 Kai, completely rewrites the script to better fit in with the later games. The game was officially released in English by MangaGamer in 2020, bundled with Rance 01: Quest for Hikari.

=== Rance III: The Fall of Leazas ===
The Kingdom of Leazas's castle is suddenly invaded by the Helmanian Empire, who borders them to the west. Fiends, nigh-invulnerable monsters who drank the blood of the Archfiend, are believed to be behind the unexpected attack attack, and Lia Parapara Leazas, the princess of Leazas who has fallen for Rance, calls upon him to save the kingdom. Rance sets out on a quest to find the power of Chaos, which is said to wield the ability to break the Fiends' invincibility field. This was the first game in the series to take on a larger scale, being the starting point for much of the lore and world building that the rest of the series builds upon. It was released in 1991 for the PC-9800 series, with ports to the Sharp X68000, FM TOWNS, and Windows 98.

==== Rance 03: The Fall of Leazas ====
Rance 03 is a complete reimagining of the original game, released for Windows in 2015. It features modern graphics, a gameplay system building on top of the one featured in Rance 01, and massive expansions to the original game's scenario. Also being the only game in the series to feature voice acting, it is the most advanced of the Rance series' remakes. It was officially released in English by MangaGamer in 2025.

=== Rance IV: Legacy of the Sect ===
Directly following the events of Rance III, Rance, shortly after having saved Leazas from the Helmanian Empire and the Fiends, is sent to Ylapu, a giant island floating above Leazas. There, Rance must find a way to return to The Continent's surface, while being hindered by agents from Helman who are attempting to revive and control the Wargod Upsilon, an ancient superweapon created by the Holy Magic Sect. This game connects heavily to AliceSoft's Toushin Toshi series. It was released in 1993 for the PC-9800 series, and was later ported to the FM TOWNS and Windows 95.

==== Rance 4.1: Save the Medicine Plant! ====
Shortly after Rance IV, Rance accepts a quest to stop a horde of underground monsters from attacking the Happiness Pharmaceutical building, where Ibeprofun, a healing medicine, is produced. The ending leads directly into the next game, Rance 4.2: Angel Army.

==== Rance 4.2: Angel Army ====
Continuing after the previous game, Rance 4.1: Save the Medicine Plant!, Rance chases down the remainder of the Angel Army, while himself being chased after by an assassination group and three "Rare Gal-Monsters". The two games were released in 1995 for the PC-9800 series, FM TOWNS, and Windows.

=== Brutal King Rance ===
A while after the events of Rance IV, Rance, bored of his normal life, gathers a group of outlaw bandits, based in eastern Helman. The imperial army quickly strikes down the bandits, taking Sill Plain and Soul Less captive, but Rance narrowly escapes to Leazas. Desperate for aid in taking back his captured allies and enacting revenge on the Helmanian Empire, he marries Lia, who is now the Queen of Leazas, in order to become the tyrannical King of Leazas and use the country's power to save his allies and conquer the world for his own personal interests. Meanwhile, on the opposite end of The Continent, war escalates between the two opposing factions in the Monster Realm.

Brutal King Rance (also known as Kichikuou Rance) serves as a non-canonical "what if..." conclusion for the Rance series, based on the idea of Rance becoming a tyrannical king. Released in 1996, it is the first grand strategy game in the Rance series, and was the basis for Sengoku Rance and other non-Rance titles by AliceSoft with similar gameplay. It was also the first AliceSoft game released primarily for Windows, and all other Rance games would follow.

=== Rance 5D: The Lonely Girl ===
A soft reboot of the Rance series, Rance 5D released in 2002 after a 6-year hiatus following Brutal King Rance. Rance 5D: The Lonely Girl is based on a unique roulette system, where the role-playing elements are determined by randomization. In the game, Rance is traveling through the Continent, when he and Sill stumble upon Genbu Castle, a castle leading to another dimension. They must then escape the dimension, along with a new ally, Rizna Lanfbitt.

The name, 5D, comes from the four different development phases the game went through (5A-5D). It was released in 2002 for Windows. The game was officially released in English by MangaGamer in 2016, bundled with Rance VI: Collapse of Zeth.

=== Rance VI: Collapse of Zeth ===
Rance, shortly after his trials from Rance 5D: The Lonely Girl, travels to the magical Kingdom of Zeth while on a job. After offending a high-ranking governmental official, Rance is sent to a slave camp. While there, Rance collaborates with resistance group "Ice Flame", which seeks to change the inequality of Zethan society, in which non-magic users are treated as second-class citizens. Rance VI: Collapse of Zeth, released in 2004, is one of the most well-received installments in the Rance series, primarily due to its expansion on story elements from the non-canon Brutal King Rance. The game was officially translated by MangaGamer in 2016, bundled with Rance 5D: The Lonely Girl.

=== Sengoku Rance ===
Rance sets out for Nippon, an island archipelago to the east of the Continent, which is modeled after the Warring-States Period of Japanese history. Having been entrusted by an ill Oda Nobunaga to command the Oda clan in his place, Rance seeks to unite Nippon under the Oda clan and have sex with as many of the beautiful Nipponese women as he can. Sengoku Rance, also known as Rance VII, was one of AliceSoft's best-selling titles of all time, being one of the most common entry points to the series. The game was released in Japan in 2006, and an official English translation by MangaGamer was released in 2019. It was officially released in English by MangaGamer in 2025, and Steam edition was officially released in October 2026.

=== Rance Quest ===
Also known as Rance VIII, Rance Quest directly follows the events of Sengoku Rance. Rance returns to the Continent to seek a cure for the curse that was placed on Sill. While sneaking into Pencilcow, the home of the Kalar race, to find a cure for Sill, he offends the Queen with his antics, and she places a curse of abstinence on him in retaliation. He then journeys around the Continent, seeking a cure for both himself and for Sill. This installment focuses more on the individual stories of its various characters than on continuing the greater storyline of the series itself. The game was released in 2011, and an official English translation by MangaGamer was released in 2021.

==== Rance Quest Magnum ====
An expansion of Rance Quest, Rance Quest Magnum adds a second, more focused storyline accessible after completing the original game's ending. The story follows the selection of a new Mulalaloux—the pope of Alicism, The Continent's most popular religion—shortly after the previous pope's death. Meanwhile, a cult acts against Alicism in the background, contaminating the souls of the depressed. The expansion's storyline includes an ending that segues into Rance IX, and was directly implemented into the official English release, without needing to be purchased separately.

=== Rance IX: The Helmanian Revolution ===
The government of the Helmanian Empire has fallen into the hands of Stessel Romanov, who corrupts the country from behind the scenes. A revolutionary force led by the former Prince of Helman, Patton Misnarge, seeks to take back the government and restore it from its inner corruption. Patton solicits the aid of Rance, who agrees, with his own personal interests in mind. This game serves as a spiritual successor to one of AliceSoft's earlier standalone titles, Mamatoto: A Record of War, borrowing many elements such as characters, plot threads, and gameplay mechanics. The game was released in 2014, and was localized by MangaGamer in 2023.

=== Rance X: Showdown ===
The conclusion of the Rance series, it was released on 23 February 2018. The war amongst the Fiends of the Monster Realm has ended, and they now invade the human realm, to their east. Rance leads the combined forces of all humanity to battle the attacking Fiends. It is known to have the largest video game script ever written. The work was originally planned as a trilogy, but the third part was canceled during development, and only the first two were released. An official English translation by MangaGamer is in progress, though a release date has not yet been confirmed.

== Characters ==
Rance (ランス, Ransu)
The main playable and the titular character of the Rance series. He is a powerful warrior who was created to the "kichiku" (Japanese: 鬼畜, which means extreme violence, sexual assault, or sadistic themes in Japan video games) character archetype. He was based out of a town in the Free Cities Alliance, where he accepts jobs from Keith's Guild when he is low on money. He lives in the "Rance Castle", which he had built after the events of Rance Quest. The games generally feature quests and other missions that he embarks upon to gain or regain the money he has lost.
Sill Plain (シィル・プライン, Shiiru Purain)
A powerful magic user that generally accompanies Rance on his quests. He bought her from a slave camp in Zeth, where she was born; she now must travel with him wherever he goes. She was frozen in ice at the end of Sengoku Rance and freed at the end of Rance IX: The Helmanian Revolution.
Athena 2.0 (あてな2号, Atena Ni-gō)
An organic-base android that functions as a pet to Rance. An accident during her creation caused her to have lower intelligence and an inability to gain a higher level. She was created in the events of Rance IV: The Legacy of the Sect. She is a noted magic user, although she is not as powerful as Sill due to her limitations.
Lia Parapara Leazas (リア・パラパラ・リーザス, Ria Parapara Rīzasu)
The Queen of Leazas, who married Rance in Brutal King Rance. She brought a new age of prosperity to the kingdom, which led to an antagonism brewed amongst a number of foreign countries and noblemen. She became the queen after her two brothers were killed in a succession dispute. She grants her handmaiden, Maris Amaryllis, a large amount of governing power, whilst regularly taking maidens by way of Kanami Kentou, a Nipponese ninja under her command. Her serial kidnapping was eventually thwarted by Rance.
Kanami Kentou (見当 かなみ, Kentō Kanami)
A Nipponese ninja who was taken in by Queen Lia Leazas after she got lost on the Continent. She is generally engaged in assisting the queen in getting the affection of Rance, although she was used to gather maidens until the events of Rance: The Quest for Hikari.
Rizna Lanfbitt (リズナ・ランフビット, Rizuna Ranfubitto)
A magic user, originally from Zeth, she is first encountered by Rance in the Genbu Castle dimension in Rance 5D: The Lonely Girl when he accidentally enters there. She is incredibly naïve, and that naïveté caused her a lot of pain while trapped in the alternate dimension; while a kind spirit helped her, it was Rance that enabled her to escape. She is now in the protection of the King of Zeth, a childhood friend of hers whom she knew before she was imprisoned.
Copandon Dott (コパンドン・ドット, Kopandon Dotto)
A noted businesswoman, who seeks to marry Rance in order to increase her luck. She was born as a miko, but after predicting her own future as one of great misfortune, became obsessed with luck and wealth; this caused her to strive towards business, where she succeeded. She is first encountered in Rance 5D: The Lonely Girl, while seeking a man who has great luck.
Urza Pranaice (ウルザ・プラナアイス, Uruza Puranaaisu)
The leader of the Zeth resistance group Ice Flame. She is introduced to Rance when he enters the Zeth slave camp in Rance VI: The Collapse of Zeth, and takes control of her resistance group. The game continues, Zeth is made more equal, and the resistance groups is disbanded. She becomes one of the Four Lords who guard Zeth, the first non-magic user to do so.
Crook Mofus (クルックー・モフス, Kurukkū Mofusu)
The Pope of the Church of Alice, the dominant religion on The Continent. She first appeared in Rance Quest as a bishop in the church; she became the Pope when the former one, Duran Teyuran, died. She has a great knowledge of curses, and helped free Sill from her curse at the end of Rance IX: The Helmanian Revolution.
Sachiko Centers (サチコ・センターズ, Sachiko Sentāzu)
She was saved by Rance whilst being attacked by monsters during the events of Rance Quest and made into his slave. She is a member of the Church of Alice, and is very respectful to Crook, the church's Pope. She is a very powerful guard in combat.
Patton Misnarge (パットン・ミスナルジ, Patton Misunaruji)
A former prince of Helman, who led the war against Leazas in the events of Rance III: The Fall of Leazas. He has a key role in Rance IX: The Helmanian Revolution, where Rance aids him in a large force seeking to take back the country from its current, corrupt state.

== OVA ==
A hentai OVA based upon the series, Rance: Sabaku no Guardian, was released on December 25, 1993. It was not directly related to the events of any game in the series. It consisted of two episodes.

A second original video animation series, Rance 01: Hikari wo Motomete The Animation, was an adaptation of the remake of the first game, Rance 01: The Quest for Hikari, and was released from December 26, 2014, to June 24, 2016. Consisting of four episodes, the OVA was directed by Takashi Nishikawa and animated by studio Seven and Pink Pineapple.

== Development ==
The Rance series' origins began in 1986 with the release of Kidnapped Miki-chan, a graphical adventure game for PC-88 computers distributed with Champion Soft's third magazine, LEMONADE. In 1987, Kidnapped Miki-chan would receive a simplified remake for the PC-98, titled Little Princess. This remake was developed by TADA, a new Champion Soft employee who joined after going to a trade school for programming, wanting to develop erotic games. In 1988, TADA would then go on to create Little Vampire, a sequel to Little Princess, as his first fully original work under Champion Soft.

=== Rance: Quest for Hikari ===
Around 1987, Champion Soft's president announced that the company would be transitioning away from erotic material. However, following poor sales from their all-ages releases bringing the company close to bankruptcy, Champion Soft would launch a sub-brand for erotic games called AliceSoft in 1989, at TADA's suggestion. Immediately, development would begin for several games under the AliceSoft brand.

One of these games were Rance: Quest for Hikari. It was entirely written and supervised by TADA, with assistance for graphics and music. The game was built on top of a text adventure game engine, leading to many of the RPG elements feeling hacky, as the engine was not built for it. TADA would comment on the game years later, expressing disbelief that the game was released in such a state.

It was created somewhat as a parody of many existing RPGs, as TADA believed it was "unrealistic" that the protagonists of these games would use their power solely for the good of others. As such, he created the character Rance to be a selfish, perverted young man who used his power for his own self-indulgence. At the suggestion of YUKIMI, the character designer, they added to this idea by also making Rance's assistant, Sill Plain, into his slave. TADA also tried to keep the game as original as possible, opting for original species like hannies instead of the stereotypical slimes and elves that were common in RPGs. The game also brought back Miki, the main heroine of Little Princess, who would become a more important character in the Rance series later on.

The game would release in 1989, selling around 600 copies in its initial run, which Champion Soft considered satisfactory. It would continue to climb in sales significantly over time.

=== Rance II ===
Rance II: The Rebellious Maidens would have a similarly small development staff, and was planned to be released within four months after the first game's launch. However, it was delayed into releasing in 1990.

It was a significant step up from the original Rance, featuring larger and more detailed maps, an improved combat system, and a bigger story. The gameplay was still lacking for an RPG, as it was still built on the same text adventure game engine as the original Rance.

Later this same year, AliceSoft would release Toushin Toshi, the beginning of a new series of the same name. TADA directed this game as well, and would later describe it as their first real RPG, expanding heavily on all of their RPG systems to provide the best gameplay experience yet.

=== Rance III ===
Rance III: The Fall of Leazas released in 1991, being another huge jump over its predecessor. It expanded upon the gameplay foundation Toushin Toshi had created, but instead of the standard turn-based RPG gameplay of the previous games, it would use a tactical RPG system, with care taken so that it wouldn't too closely resemble Nintendo's new RPG, Fire Emblem, that had become popular the year prior.

Rance III is where the series started growing rapidly in scale, incorporating more depth into the world and its story. During development of Rance II and Toushin Toshi, a new developer had joined AliceSoft, Purin. With more experience in RPGs than TADA, he would assist in the game design, along with drawing many of the men, monsters, and UI of Rance III. According to TADA, Purin was instrumental in the series taking the huge turn it did in Rance III. The game introduced more nations such as the Helman Empire, species such as Fiends, and much more. By this point, there were already plans for the entire world that the Rance series takes place in, The Continent.

While AliceSoft's previous games, especially Rance II and Toushin Toshi were successful, Rance III reached a new level of popularity. While the first two games were just seen as silly stories with an unconventional adventurer, Rance III was what brought the series to a more epic scale. The game's depth would gain it respect even among non-eroge players in Japan, with many considering it for a while to still be the best game in the entire Rance series.

=== Rance IV ===
Rance IV: Legacy of the Sect would release in 1993, being based on the cancelled game Toushin Toshi Upsilon. As such, it features many references and connects to AliceSoft's Toushin Toshi series. Purin also worked extensively on the lore in Rance IV, especially the aspects relating to the Holy Magic Sect.

It was another major step up in technology for AliceSoft's games, however, it began hitting several walls during development. Its gameplay system built upon Rance III's, but with its increasing technological scale, the team had to make some sacrifices so that it would be playable on average PCs of the time. The art was all more detailed, with many more animations, but to make the game run smoothly, dungeon exploration had to be simplified among other things. With the game's size, they were also forced to make it the first game to run off of users' hard drives, rather running everything solely off of floppy disks.

Reflecting on the game, TADA has said that it was the first time AliceSoft had overestimated its own abilities and failed to reach their goals. The game sold very well, and the development team for Toushin Toshi II kept Rance IV's shortcomings in mind, making sure to keep its scale in check so that they wouldn't reach the same development issues.

In 1995, the series was going through a lot of change. Staff was moving, some leaving such as YUKIMI, and many joining. This change, along with the staff's reflection on Rance IV's issues, led to the releases of Rance 4.1 and Rance 4.2. TADA initially planned to make some games portraying Rance's everyday life, but instead, this pair of games released in 1995 while they planned for the next major game, Rance V.

=== Brutal King Rance ===
As the Rance series was being constantly built upon in the mid-1990s, the creators found it harder to manage all of the new ideas they were coming up with for the series and its world. Thus, they created Brutal King Rance, a "what-if" spinoff game based on the idea of Rance finding himself as the ruler of a nation. It was a way to put all of their ideas into form, making one massive game to organize them all. While the game was originally called Rance V within AliceSoft, this changed once they started to consider it more of a spin-off.

This game also gave a spotlight to some of the newer AliceSoft staff, such as Masato Mitsumi, the new character designer after YUKIMI left AliceSoft. Unlike the previous character designer and TADA, Masato had much more of a taste for traditional fantasy and more serious stories, which he contributed into much of Brutal King Rance's scenario and worldbuilding.

The game's scale was able to grow much larger thanks to AliceSoft's move to focusing on Windows 95, where they had a lot more flexibility due to higher specs on computers running Windows. Before the Rance series had started, TADA was incredibly interested in grand strategy games, and Brutal King Rance finally gave him the chance to create one himself, something unimaginable on older hardware, especially after seeing the issues Rance IV's development had.

Brutal King Rance released in 1996. The gameplay concepts introduced in Brutal King Rance would later be built on for future AliceSoft games such as their Dai series.

Later on, most of the ideas from Brutal King Rance would later be rehashed and expanded upon in later games in the series. The finer details and contexts to these ideas are often massively changed, making each of the newer games refreshing.

=== Rance 5D ===
Following the release of Brutal King Rance, AliceSoft quickly started working on the next main entry to the series, Rance V. However, development was plagued with issues, most of which stemmed from a desire to live up to expectations after Brutal King Rance became a massive hit. It was also slowed by creative disagreements in how to handle the game between TADA and Masato. This led to several separate attempts to create the game, which were titled 5A, 5B, 5C, and 5D.

Rance 5D was the fourth major attempt at creating fifth Rance game after Brutal King Rance's release. In order to actually finish and release the game, TADA decided to focus on just making a game that he considered fun, and that people could easily afford, rather than trying to live up to all of the previous games. He took on Orion as the illustrator for 5D instead, as they had more of a shared vision for how the series should be.

While Rance 5D is the only version that players ultimately got to see, ideas and assets from the earlier attempts at making Rance V ended up in other AliceSoft games such as Mamatoto: A Record of War and Rance VI: Collapse of Zeth. A short reel of screenshots from the earlier Rance V attempts can be seen in Rance 5D's trailer. In some series material, Rance V is listed as a distinct canonical entry, separate from Rance 5D. The Rance X manual lists it as "unreleased", taking place between Rance IV and Rance 5D.

== Legacy ==
Rifujin na Magonote, the author of Mushoku Tensei, said that the novel series was inspired by Rance series, among other inspirations.

== See also ==
- AliceSoft
