= AliceSoft =

Japanese video game company

- Product type: Video games, Eroge
- Current owner: ChampionSoft
- Country: Japan
- Introduced: July 1989
- Markets: Video game industry
- Website: alicesoft.com

AliceSoft (アリスソフト, ArisuSofuto) (sometimes Alice Soft) has provided services since 1989, as an eroge developer and publisher for the computer market, first for the PC-88 and PC-98, and later for PCs running Microsoft Windows platforms. Its first titles were Rance and Intruder, released simultaneously in July 1989. It has continued to release several titles each year, though not always exclusively adult-oriented. It is a brand name owned by ChampionSoft Co., Ltd. (株式会社チャンピオンソフト, Kabushiki-gaisha Chanpion Sofuto), a company founded in March 1983.

== List of works ==
Series

- Rance
- Tōshin Toshi
- Dai Series
- Tsuma Series
- Pastel Chime Series
- Beat Series
- Evenicle Series

Games

- Rance (1989)
- Intruder (1989)
- D.P.S (1989)
- Alice no Yakata (1989)
- Rance II (1990)
- D.P.S SG (1990)
- Tōshin Toshi (1990)
- D.P.S SG set 2 (1991)
- Rance III (1991)
- D.P.S SG set 3 (1991)
- Dr. Stop! (1992)
- Alice no Yakata 2 (1992)
- Super D.P.S (1992)
- Dalk (1992)
- prostudent G (1993)
- Ayumi-chan Monogatari (1993)
- Rance IV (1993)
- AmbivalenZ: Niritsuhaihan (1994)
- Uchyuukaitou Funny Bee (1994)
- Tōshin Toshi 2 (1994)
- Alice no Yakata 3 (1995)
- Mugen Hōyō (1995)
- DPS Zenbu (1995)
- Rance 4.1 (1995)
- Rance 4.2 (1995)
- Only You (1996)
- Gakuen King (1996)
- Kichikuō Rance (1996)
- Ikenai Katsumi Sensei (1997)
- Kaeru nyo Panyōn (1997)
- Ikusamiko (1997)
- Alice no Yakata 4-5-6 (1997)
- Ōdō Yūsha (1998)
- DiaboLiQuE (1998)
- Pastel Chime (1998)
- Atlach=Nacha (1999)
- Prostudent Good (1999)
- Mamorigami-sama (1999)
- Mamatoto (1999)
- Hushaby Baby (1999)
- Darcrows (1999)
- Persiom (2000)
- SeeIn Ao (2000)
- 20 Seiki Alice (2000)
- Yoru ga Kuru! (2001)
- Only You - Re cross (2001)
- Daiakuji (2001)
- Tsumamigui (2002)
- Beat Angel Escalayer (2002)
- Rance 5D (2002)
- Mama Nyonyo (2003)
- Tsumamigui 2 (2003)
- Les Chairs Cruelles (2003)
- Daibanchou (2003)
- Night Demon (2003)
- Daibanchō: Big Bang Age (2003)
- Majo no Shokuzai (2004)
- Rance VI: Zesu Hōkai (2004)
- Alice no Yakata 7 (2004)
- Pastel Chime Continue (2005)
- GALZOO Island (2005)
- Yokubari Saboten (2006)
- Tsumashibori (2006)
- Sengoku Rance (2006)
- Ojōsama o Iinari ni suru Game (2007)
- Double Sensei Life (2007)
- Chōkō Sennin Haruka (2008)
- AliveZ (2008)
- AliveZ Quik (2008)
- Tōshin Toshi 3 (2008)
- Momoiro Guardian (2009)
- Vanish! Oppai no Kieta Ōkoku (2009)
- Boku dake no Hokenshitsu (2009)
- Alice 2010 (2010)
- Shaman's Sanctuary Miko no Seiiki (2010)
- Daiteikoku (2011)
- Rance Quest (2011)
- Rance Quest Magnum (2012)
- Oyako Rankan (2012)
- Pastel Chime 3: Bind Seeker (2013)
- Drapeko! (2013)
- Rance 01 (2013)
- Rance IX (2014)
- Beat Angel Escalayer R (2014)
- Blade Briders (2014)
- Evenicle (2015)
- Rance 03 (2015)
- Tsumamigui 3 (2016)
- Heartful Maman (2017)
- Choko Shinki Ixseal (2017)
- Rance X (2018)
- Evenicle 2 (2019)
- Hentai Labyrinth (2020)
- Dohna Dohna (2020)
- Beat Wars Escalation Heroines (2020)
- Oku-sama no Kaifuku Jutsu (2022)
