= Highrise (video game) =

- Developer: Pocket Worlds
- Publisher: Pocket Worlds
- Designers: Anton Bernstein, Jimmy Xu, Gordon Su
- Engine: Unity (since version 4.0)
- Platforms: iOS, Android, Windows, macOS
- Release: January 25, 2020
- Genres: Social simulation, Virtual world
- Mode: Multiplayer

Highrise is a free-to-play mobile-first virtual world and social simulation application developed and published by Pocket Worlds, a gaming company based in Austin, Texas. The platform allows users to create customizable avatars, build and decorate virtual rooms, participate in social events, and buy, sell, or trade digital items through a community-run marketplace. The game is available on iOS, Android, Windows, and macOS.

== History ==
Pocket Worlds was established in 2013 with a focus on social mobile games. Highrise launched in beta on iOS in March 2015. It was released on Android in January 2020.

Pocket Worlds participated in the Summer 2018 batch of Y Combinator. In January 2021, Bitkraft Ventures led the company's Series A funding round.

In 2023, the platform recorded more than 20 million total downloads and the secondary marketplace surpassed $250 million in cumulative revenue. In 2024, Pocket Worlds released Highrise 4.0 and Highrise Studio, and launched the Highrise Earn Program.

In January 2025, Pocket Worlds acquired Infinite Canvas, an AI‑driven user-generated content studio. Pocket Worlds also operates Everskies, a browser-based avatar community platform, which it acquired in 2021.

== Gameplay ==
Players create avatars using a catalog of over 50,000 items across different styles, which can be traded or saved to a wishlist. The platform includes player-created virtual rooms for social interaction, with text and voice chat, emotes, and a feed for sharing content.

Highrise is designed around social interaction and self-expression, with features including crew-based cooperative events, a friend system, and player-hosted social spaces that enable ongoing community interaction. The platform has been described as a mobile virtual world application focused on avatar customization and online social interaction.

In April 2024, Highrise Studio was introduced, providing tools for creating 3D environments, game modes, and assets in Unity, with creators receiving compensation based on item sales and user engagement.

== Reception ==
By 2025, Highrise had over 50 million registered users and was available on Google Play, Apple App Store, and Steam. The platform received a Gold Stevie Award in 2025 and was a finalist at the Tech in Motion Timmy Awards 2024 and the Pocket Gamer Mobile Games Awards 2025. In 2025, the platform was named one of Fast Company's Most Innovative Companies 2025.
