= List of PC-98 games =

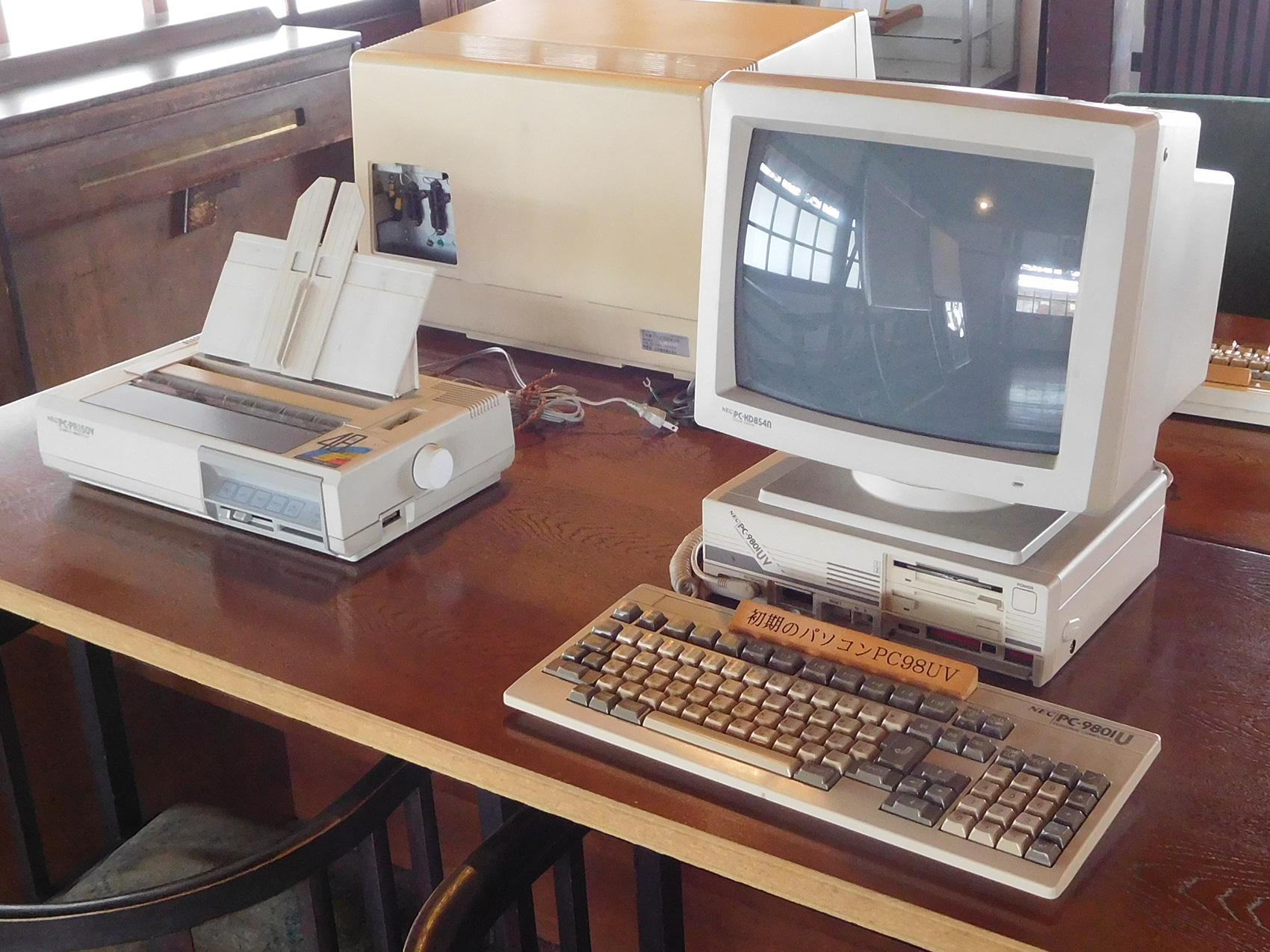
NEC PC-9801

Listed here are all 1,257 known games released for the PC-98.

== List of games ==
| Title | Release date(s) | Developer(s) | Publisher(s) |
|---|---|---|---|
| 101-kaime no Approach Shot | March 7, 1992 | Santa Fe | Santa Fe |
| 177 | September 1986 | Macadamia Soft | Macadamia Soft |
| 2 Shot Diary | April 21, 1994 | Mink Co. | Mink Co. |
| 31: Iwayuru Hitotsu no Chō Lovely na Bōken Katsugeki | March 2, 1995 | Altacia | Altacia |
| 38000 Kilo no Kokū | December 1989 | System Sacom | System Sacom |
| 3x3 Eyes: Sanjiyan Henjō | February 5, 1993 | Nihon Create | Nihon Create |
| 46 Okunen Monogatari: The Shinkaron | May 26, 1990 | | Enix |
| 48 Night Story | August 21, 1992 | Silky's | Silky's |
| 4-D Boxing | January 14, 1993 | Distinctive Software | Electronic Arts Victor |
| 4D Sports Tennis | July 23, 1993 | Distinctive Software | Electronic Arts Victor |
| The 4th Unit | 1988 | Data West | Data West |
| 5 Jikan me no Venus | April 7, 1995 | Fairy Dust | Fairy Dust |
| 688 Attack Sub | August 23, 1991 | Electronic Arts | Victor Musical Industries |
| 7 Colors | 1992 | Gamos Ltd. | Hot-B Co. |
| Abunai Tengu Densetsu | October 15, 1989 | Alice Soft | Alice Soft |
| Ace of Spades | December 7, 1995 | Love Gun | Love Gun |
| Acrojet | October 1988 | MicroProse | SystemSoft |
| Advanced Power Dolls 2 | February 23, 1996 | Kogado Studio | Kogado Studio |
| Adventureland | July 1984 | | StarCraft, Inc. |
| Aerobiz | October 1, 1992 | Koei | Koei |
| Aerobiz Supersonic | October 1, 1993 | Koei | Koei |
| Agalta | 1993 | Fenrir | Fenrir |
| Agalta 3 | 1995 | Fenrir | Fenrir |
| Agalta II | 1994 | Fenrir | Fenrir |
| Aggres | March 1986 | Riverhillsoft | Riverhillsoft |
| Ah! Megami-Sama | March 20, 1993 | Studio Orphee (AIC Spirits) | Banpresto |
| Ai no Omochashi: Space Gigolo - Red Cobra | March 10, 1995 | Illusion | Illusion |
| Air Combat II | May 28, 1991 | SystemSoft | SystemSoft |
| Air Combat: Yūgekiō II | October 1989 | SystemSoft | SystemSoft |
| Ai Shimai: Futari no Kajitsu | September 30, 1994 | Silky's | Silky's |
| AI Shogi | December 5, 1993 | Something Good | Something Good |
| AIZA: New Generation | April 20, 1991 | Lawins, Tierheit | Takeru |
| Akatsuki no Bizantira | September 1994 | ASCII Corporation | ASCII Corporation |
| Akiko GOLD: The Queen of Adult | December 22, 1994 | Red-Zone | FairyTale |
| Akiko Premium Version | January 1993 | Red-Zone | FairyTale |
| Akumu: Aoi Kajitsu no Sanka | April 26, 1996 | Studio Möbius | Studio Möbius |
| Alantia: Legend of Blue Star | November 21, 1988 | | Cross Media Soft |
| Alaskan Malamute G.C. | September 11, 1992 | Home Data Corp. | Home Data Corp. |
| Albatross | October 1986 | Telenet Japan | Telenet Japan |
| Alice no Yakata | December 1989 | Alice Soft | Alice Soft |
| Alice no Yakata 2 | July 1992 | Alice Soft | Alice Soft |
| Alice no Yakata 3 | April 1995 | Alice Soft | Alice Soft |
| Alice-tachi no Gogo | December 1, 1989 | New System House Oh! | New System House Oh! |
| Alone in the Dark | December 10, 1993 | Infogrames | Arrow Micro-Techs |
| Alone in the Dark 2 | December 3, 1994 | Infogrames | Arrow Micro-Techs |
| Alone in the Dark 3 | December 8, 1995 | Infogrames | AMT Savan |
| Alpha | July 4, 1985 | Square Co. | Square Co. |
| Alpha-Dain | April 28, 1992 | Great | Great |
| Alshark | March 24, 1991 | Right Stuff Corp. | Right Stuff Corp. |
| Alvaleak Bōkenki | November 5, 1993 | Glodia | Glodia |
| Amaranth | December 14, 1990 | Fuga System | Fuga System |
| Amaranth II | August 21, 1992 | Fuga System | Fuga System |
| Amaranth III | January 14, 1994 | Fuga System | Fuga System |
| Amaranth IV | August 4, 1995 | Fuga System | Fuga System |
| Amaranth KH: Stellar Ōkoku Kenkokutan | April 21, 1995 | Fuga System | Fuga System |
| AmbivalenZ: Niritsu Haihan | April 28, 1994 | Alice Soft | Alice Soft |
| American Truck | March 1986 | Telenet Japan | Telenet Japan |
| A Midsummer Daytime's Dream Plus | 1990 | Bolze | Bolze |
| Amy's Fantasies | 1995 | C's Ware | C's Ware |
| The Ancient Art of War | 1987 | Evryware | Broderbund |
| The Ancient Art of War at Sea | 1988 | Evryware | Broderbund |
| Angel Army | April 1, 1993 | Illusion | Illusion |
| Angel Halo | October 17, 1996 | Active Software | Active Software |
| Angel Hearts | May 16, 1989 | ELF Corporation | ELF Corporation |
| Angel Night | April 26, 1996 | Four-Nine | Four-Nine |
| Angelus: Akuma no Fukuin | August 1989 | | Enix |
| Animahjong V3 | February 26, 1993 | Sogna | Sogna |
| Animahjong X | September 14, 1994 | Sogna | Sogna |
| Animahjong X Perfect | December 9, 1994 | Sogna | Sogna |
| Anniversary: Memories of Summer Vacation | December 3, 1993 | Janis | Janis |
| Another Genesis | June 21, 1990 | Soft Plan | Soft Plan |
| Aoki Ōkami to Shiroki Mejika | May 15, 1985 | Koei | Koei |
| Appare-den: Fukuryū no Shō | December 8, 1995 | Technical Group Laboratory | Technical Group Laboratory |
| Arabesque: Shōjo-tachi no Orinasu Ai no Monogatari | April 13, 1994 | FairyTale | FairyTale |
| Arcshu: Kagerou no Jidai o Koete | March 1990 | Wolf Team | Wolf Team |
| Arctic | May 1988 | Artdink Corporation | Artdink Corporation |
| Arcticfox | August 1988 | Dynamix | Electronic Arts |
| Arcus | July 10, 1988 | Wolf Team | Wolf Team |
| Arcus II: Silent Symphony | October 18, 1990 | Wolf Team | Wolf Team |
| Arcus III | January 1991 | Wolf Team | Wolf Team |
| A Ressha de Ikō: A-Train | 1987 | Artdink Corporation | Artdink Corporation |
| A Ressha de Ikō: A-Train 2 | July 1988 | Artdink Corporation | Artdink Corporation |
| A Ressha de Ikō: A-Train 3 | December 14, 1990 | Artdink Corporation | Artdink Corporation |
| A Ressha de Ikō: A-Train 4 | December 3, 1993 | Artdink Corporation | Artdink Corporation |
| A Ressha de Ikō Fukkokuban | 1994 | Artdink Corporation | Artdink Corporation |
| Argo | 1987 | Kure Software Koubou | Kure Software Koubou |
| Arkanoid | 1987 | Taito | Taito |
| Armist | June 1992 | Basement | Basement |
| Artemis | July 12, 1991 | Birdy Soft | Birdy Soft |
| Asteka | April 1985 | Nihon Falcom | Nihon Falcom |
| The Atlas | August 2, 1991 | Artdink Corporation | Artdink Corporation |
| The Atlas II | April 9, 1993 | Artdink Corporation | Artdink Corporation |
| Ayayo's Dive Aflame | December 10, 1994 | HARD Software | HARD Software |
| Ayayo's Live Affection | February 13, 1993 | HARD Software | HARD Software |
| Ayumi-chan Monogatari | September 15, 1993 | Alice Soft | Alice Soft |
| Ayumi-chan Monogatari: Jisshaban | 1995 | Alice Soft, Core Magazine | Core Magazine |
| Bacta | February 4, 1992 | Himeya Soft | Himeya Soft |
| Bacta 2: The Resurrection of Bacta | February 5, 1994 | Himeya Soft | Himeya Soft |
| Balance of Power | October 1988 | Mindscape | ASCII Corporation |
| Balance of the Planet | February 28, 1992 | | Acclaim Entertainment |
| Ballade for Maria | March 26, 1995 | FairyTale | FairyTale |
| Bandit Kings of Ancient China | 1991 | Koei | Koei |
| The Bard's Tale II: The Destiny Knight | October 21, 1991 | Interplay Productions | Pony Canyon |
| The Bard's Tale III: Thief of Fate | September 21, 1992 | Interplay Productions | Pony Canyon |
| Battle Chess | July 21, 1990 | Interplay Productions | Pack-In-Video |
| Battle High School | December 10, 1992 | NIC | NIC |
| Battle Queen: Saikyō Fighters Retsuden | June 28, 1996 | Space Project | Space Project |
| Bell's Avenue | March 12, 1993 | Signa Works | Wendy Magazine |
| Be-yond | August 30, 1996 | Silky's | Silky's |
| Bible Master 2: The Chaos of Aglia | July 8, 1994 | Glodia | Glodia |
| BIND: Kinbaku Jinmon Densetsu | January 21, 1996 | In-Side | In-Side |
| Binyu Hunter | July 28, 1995 | T2 | T2 |
| Birthdays | November 30, 1994 | Silky's | Silky's |
| Bishōjo Hunter ZX | April 29, 1993 | Soft House Bon bee Bon Bon | Soft House Bon bee Bon Bon |
| Black Bird: Toritachi no Tooboe | December 8, 1995 | ViVian | ViVian |
| The Black Onyx | 1984 | Bullet-Proof Software | Bullet-Proof Software |
| Blackthorne | January 31, 1996 | Blizzard Entertainment | MicroMouse Co. |
| The Blade of Blackpoole | January 1984 | | StarCraft, Inc. |
| Blandia | June 22, 1995 | Allumer | Ving Co. |
| Blind Games | October 18, 1996 | May-Be Soft | May-Be Soft |
| Blitzkrieg: Tōbu Sensen 1941~45 | December 1990 | SystemSoft | SystemSoft |
| The Block Buster | June 30, 1995 | Sea Lion | Sea Lion |
| Blockout | January 18, 1991 | P.Z.Karen Co. | Acclaim Entertainment |
| Block Quest V | March 3, 1993 | WiZ | WiZ |
| Blood Seed | December 21, 1991 | Great Co. | Great Co. |
| Blue: Will to Power | January 17, 1992 | Kinpukurin | Kinpukurin |
| Bokosuka Wars | 1985 | | ASCII Corporation |
| Bomberman: Panic Bomber | April 5, 1995 | Hudson Soft | ASCII Corporation |
| Bomber Quest | October 14, 1994 | Mink Co. | Mink Co. |
| Bonnō-Yobikō 2 | July 19, 1991 | Software House Parsley | Software House Parsley |
| Bonnō-Yobikō 3 | November 20, 1992 | Software House Parsley | Software House Parsley |
| Brandish | October 25, 1991 | Nihon Falcom | Nihon Falcom |
| Brandish 2: The Planet Buster | March 12, 1993 | Nihon Falcom | Nihon Falcom |
| Brandish 3: Spirit of Balcan | 1994 | Nihon Falcom | Nihon Falcom |
| Brandish VT | 1996 | Nihon Falcom | Nihon Falcom |
| Branmarker | July 12, 1991 | D.O. Corp. | D.O. Corp. |
| Branmarker 2 | July 28, 1995 | D.O. Corp. | D.O. Corp. |
| Bretonne Lais | November 24, 1989 | SystemSoft | SystemSoft |
| Briganty: The Roots of Darkness | November 27, 1995 | GIGA | GIGA |
| Brocken | 1991 | M.I.N | M.I.N |
| Bruce Wilcox no AI Igo 2 | February 1990 | Something Good | Something Good |
| Bruce Wilcox no AI Igo 3 | November 1990 | Something Good | Something Good |
| Bruce Wilcox no AI Igo 4 | January 1993 | Something Good | Something Good |
| Bunkasai | June 14, 1996 | UCom | UCom |
| Bunretsu Shugoshin: Twinkle Star | July 29, 1993 | Studio Twinkle | Studio Twinkle |
| Burai: Gekan - Kanketsu-hen | December 27, 1990 | Riverhillsoft | Riverhillsoft |
| Burai: Jōkan | December 1989 | Riverhillsoft | Riverhillsoft |
| Burning Dragon | August 5, 1993 | WiZ | WiZ |
| Buzz Aldrin's Race into Space | March 24, 1995 | Strategic Visions | Victor Entertainment |
| The Byōin | December 1987 | PSK | PSK |
| Cal | 1990 | Birdy Soft | Birdy Soft |
| Cal Gaiden: Tiny Steps | July 24, 1993 | Birdy Soft | Birdy Soft |
| Cal II | 1991 | Birdy Soft | Birdy Soft |
| Cal III | July 10, 1993 | Birdy Soft | Birdy Soft |
| Call of Cthulhu: Shadow of the Comet | March 3, 1995 | Infrogrames | Electronic Arts Victor |
| Can Can Bunny | August 10, 1989 | Cocktail Soft | Cocktail Soft |
| Caramel Quest: Meitenkyō no Megami Zō | May 14, 1991 | Agumix | Agumix |
| Caroll | October 1990 | ZigZag Software | New System House Oh! |
| Casablanca ni Ai o: Satsujinsha wa Jikū o Koete | 1986 | Thinking Rabbit | Thinking Rabbit |
| Case of Dungeons | 1993 | Studio K2 | Studio K2 |
| Castle of Dr. Brain | October 9, 1992 | Sierra On-Line | Sierra On-Line |
| Castlequest | 1986 | ASCII Corporation | ASCII Corporation |
| Castles | August 21, 1992 | Quicksilver Software | Victor Musical Industries |
| Castles II: Siege & Conquest | December 3, 1993 | Quicksilver Software | Victor Entertainment |
| The Castle | July 1985 | ASCII Corporation | ASCII Corporation |
| Cat's Part 1 | February 28, 1993 | Cat's Pro | Cat's Pro |
| Celery | July 7, 1989 | Software House Parsley | Software House Parsley |
| Centurion: Defender of Rome | November 26, 1993 | Bits of Magic | Electronic Arts Victor |
| C'est La Vie | February 28, 1995 | May-Be Soft | May-Be Soft |
| Chakra | May 14, 1993 | Discovery | Discovery |
| Champions of Krynn | October 21, 1992 | Strategic Simulations, Inc. | Pony Canyon |
| Chaos Angels | 1989 | ASCII Corporation | ASCII Corporation |
| Charade | October 27, 1995 | Apple Pie | Apple Pie |
| Charm | October 10, 1992 | Acid Plan | Acid Plan |
| Cherry Bomb: Chō Ojōsama Sayaka-chan Nanba Daisakusen | April 7, 1994 | Peppermint Kids | Peppermint Kids |
| Cherry Jam: Kanojo ga Hadaka ni Kigaetara | August 2, 1996 | JAM | JAM |
| Chicks' Tale | February 15, 1995 | Riruhi's Party | Riruhi's Party |
| Chiemi & Naomi | December 22, 1993 | Red-Zone | FairyTale |
| Chō Jikū Yōsai Macross: Love Stories | July 29, 1994 | Family Soft | Family Soft |
| Chō Jikū Yōsai Macross: Remember Me | March 19, 1993 | Family Soft | Family Soft |
| Chō Jikū Yōsai Macross: Skull Leader | May 13, 1994 | Family Soft | Family Soft |
| Chōkōsō Crisis | April 13, 1994 | Altacia | Altacia |
| Christine | October 1986 | PSK | PSK |
| Chuck Yeager's Advanced Flight Simulator | 1988 | Lerner Research | Electronic Arts |
| Chushaki: Hirasawa Nurse School | July 26, 1996 | Aypio | Aypio |
| Clone Doll: Kagai Jugyō | December 21, 1995 | Space Project | Space Project |
| Cobra Mission | October 25, 1991 | INOS | INOS |
| The Cockpit | 1984 | Compac Inc. | Compac Inc. |
| Coin | August 30, 1996 | Ange | Ange |
| Colonial Conquest | November 21, 1989 | Strategic Simulations, Inc. | Cross Media Soft |
| Columns | July 26, 1991 | Sega | SystemSoft |
| Coming Heart | November 30, 1995 | May-Be Soft | May-Be Soft |
| Command H.Q. | July 31, 1992 | Ozark Softscape | MicroProse |
| Continental | March 31, 1992 | Game Technopolis | Game Technopolis |
| Corpse Party | April 22, 1996 | KENIX-SOFT | KENIX-SOFT |
| Cosmic Psycho | September 1991 | Cocktail Soft | Cocktail Soft |
| Cosmic Soldier | October 1985 | Kogado Software | Kogado Software |
| Cosmic Soldier: Psychic War | June 26, 1988 | Kogado Software | Kogado Software |
| Cosmo Angel | June 1986 | PSK | PSK |
| The Count | February 1985 | | StarCraft, Inc. |
| The Coveted Mirror | 1986 | | StarCraft, Inc. |
| CrEastar: Planets in Legend | March 10, 1989 | Bothtec | Bothtec |
| Crescent | October 21, 1993 | Silky's | Silky's |
| Crescent Moon Girl | August 15, 1989 | Alice Soft | Alice Soft |
| The Crimson Crown | February 1986 | Penguin Software | StarCraft, Inc. |
| Crimson III | October 19, 1990 | Xtalsoft | Xtalsoft |
| Critical Mass | 1985 | | StarCraft, Inc. |
| Cruise Chaser Blassty | 1986 | Square Co. | Square Co. |
| CRW: Metal Jacket | October 7, 1994 | Team Kikai | WiZ |
| Crystal Chaser: Tenkū no Masuishō | June 15, 1991 | Telenet Japan | Telenet Japan |
| Crystal Dream | August 12, 1989 | Striker | Striker |
| Crystal Dream II: Maō no Gen'ei | March 24, 1990 | Striker | Striker |
| Crystal Quest | July 10, 1992 | Pixy Bell | Pixy Bell |
| Crystal Rinal | 1994 | D.O. Corp. | D.O. Corp. |
| Cry Sweeper | December 13, 1996 | D.O. Corp. | D.O. Corp. |
| Curse of the Azure Bonds | July 21, 1991 | Strategic Simulations, Inc. | Pony Canyon |
| Custom Mate | September 17, 1993 | Cocktail Soft | Cocktail Soft |
| Custom Mate 2 | October 21, 1994 | Cocktail Soft | Cocktail Soft |
| Custom Mate 3 | December 8, 1995 | Cocktail Soft | Cocktail Soft |
| Cuty Cop: Nusumareta File no Nazo | June 30, 1994 | ICE | ICE |
| Cyberia | July 28, 1995 | Xatrix Entertainment | NEC |
| Cyber Illusion | September 22, 1995 | Pearl Soft | Pearl Soft |
| Cybernetic Hi-School Part 2: Highway Buster | December 10, 1989 | Gainax | Gainax |
| Cybernetic Hi-School Part 3: Gunbuster | March 24, 1990 | Gainax | Gainax |
| Cyrus | 1989 | Intelligent Chess Software | Acclaim Entertainment |
| D-Again: The 4th Unit Five | July 27, 1990 | Data West | Data West |
| Daisenryaku II | March 20, 1987 | SystemSoft | SystemSoft |
| Daisenryaku III: Great Commander | June 1989 | SystemSoft | SystemSoft |
| Daisenryaku IV | June 12, 1992 | SystemSoft | SystemSoft |
| Daitōa Mokushiroku: Goh | March 29, 1991 | Wolf Team | Wolf Team |
| Dalk | 1992 | Alice Soft | Alice Soft |
| The Dam Busters | January 1986 | Sydney Development | Soft Pro International |
| Danchi-zuma no Yūwaku | June 1983 | Koei | Koei |
| Dangel | September 9, 1995 | Mink Co. | Mink Co. |
| Daraku no Kuni no Angie: Kyōkai no Mesudoreitachi | April 19, 1996 | PIL | PIL |
| D'ark | December 11, 1992 | Himeya Soft | Himeya Soft |
| D'ark Gaiden | July 9, 1993 | Himeya Soft | Himeya Soft |
| Dark Seraphim | July 15, 1995 | Kure Software Koubou | Kure Software Koubou |
| Darwin's Dilemma | July 19, 1991 | Inline Design | StarCraft, Inc. |
| David's Midnight Magic | 1984 | Broderbund | SystemSoft |
| Dawn Patrol | 1997 | Rowan Software | KSS |
| Dead Force | July 29, 1994 | Fuga System | Fuga System |
| Death Bringer | December 10, 1988 | Renovation Game | Telenet Japan |
| Death Knights of Krynn | August 20, 1993 | Strategic Simulations, Inc. | Pony Canyon |
| Deep | December 14, 1994 | JAST Co. | JAST Co. |
| De. FaNa | July 18, 1995 | Himeya Soft | Himeya Soft |
| Deflektor | July 12, 1991 | Vortex Software | Bullet-Proof Software |
| DE・JA | June 1990 | ELF Corporation | ELF Corporation. |
| DE・JA II | June 25, 1992 | ELF Corporation | ELF Corporation |
| Deja Vu: A Nightmare Comes True!! | July 21, 1991 | ICOM Simulations | Pack-In-Video |
| Déjà Vu II: Lost in Las Vegas | September 5, 1991 | ICOM Simulations | Pack-In-Video |
| Delicious Lunch Pack | June 21, 1996 | Scoop Software Productions | Scoop Software Productions |
| Delphi no Shintaku | March 25, 1993 | Koei | Koei |
| Demon City | December 21, 1993 | Cocktail Soft | Cocktail Soft |
| Demon's Eye III | December 30, 1998 | Hobby Land Soft | Hobby Land Soft |
| Dengeki Division | November 13, 1993 | Apple Pie | Apple Pie |
| Dengeki Nurse | September 22, 1992 | Cocktail Soft | Cocktail Soft |
| Dengeki Nurse 2: More Sexy | July 29, 1994 | Cocktail Soft | Cocktail Soft |
| Dennō Sentai: Lavian Three | July 15, 1994 | Wendy Magazine | Wendy Magazine |
| Dennou Gakuen | July 15, 1989 | Gainax | Gainax |
| Dennou Shogi II: Eisei Meijin | March 9, 1990 | Konami | Konami |
| Descent | November 25, 1995 | Parallax Software | Electronic Arts Victor |
| Desire | 1994 | C's Ware | C's Ware |
| Dezeni Land | 1984 | Hudson Soft | Hudson Soft |
| Dezeni World | January 1985 | Hudson Soft | Hudson Soft |
| Diablo | August 1988 | | Broderbund |
| Different Realm: Kuon no Kenja | September 24, 1993 | Glodia | Glodia |
| Digan no Maseki | 1988 | Artec | Artec |
| Dinosaur | June 1991 | Nihon Falcom | Nihon Falcom |
| DIRES: giger・loop | 1988 | Bothtec | Bothtec |
| Disc Saga | 1992 | Compile | Compile |
| Diver's | August 11, 1994 | Mink Co. | Mink Co. |
| Dokidoki Vacation: Kirameku Kisetsu no Naka de | January 27, 1995 | Cocktail Soft | Cocktail Soft |
| Dōkyūsei | December 17, 1992 | ELF Corporation | ELF Corporation |
| Dōkyūsei 2 | January 31, 1995 | ELF Corporation | ELF Corporation |
| Dome | June 1988 | System Sacom | System Sacom |
| Doom | December 9, 1994 | id Software | Imagineer |
| Doom II | September 29, 1995 | id Software | Imagineer |
| Door Door | 1984 | Chunsoft | Enix |
| DOR | February 28, 1992 | D.O. Corp. | D.O. Corp. |
| DOR 2 | May 19, 1992 | D.O. Corp. | D.O. Corp. |
| DoraDora Emotion: Seihaiden | November 2, 1995 | Cocktail Soft | Cocktail Soft |
| DOR: Part 3 | November 27, 1992 | D.O. Corp. | D.O. Corp. |
| D: Ōshū Shinkirō | August 10, 1990 | Wolf Team | Wolf Team |
| Double Eagle | June 1989 | Artdink Corporation | Artdink Corporation |
| D.P.S: Dream Program System | December 15, 1989 | Alice Soft | Alice Soft |
| D.P.S. Zenbu | November 10, 1995 | Alice Soft | Alice Soft |
| DR² Night Janki | February 24, 1995 | Leaf | Leaf |
| Dracula Hakushaku | November 27, 1992 | FairyTale | FairyTale |
| Dragon Buster | March 1989 | Namco | Dempa Shimbunsha |
| Dragon Eyes | January 21, 1991 | Game Technopolis | Game Technopolis |
| Dragon Half | 1993 | Microcabin | Microcabin |
| Dragon Knight | 1989 | ELF Corporation | ELF Corporation |
| Dragon Knight 4 | 1994 | ELF Corporation | ELF Corporation |
| Dragon Knight II | 1991 | ELF Corporation | ELF Corporation |
| Dragon Lore: The Legend Begins | April 19, 1996 | Cryo Interactive | KSS |
| Dragon Master Silk II | August 4, 1995 | Gimmick House | Gimmick House |
| Dragon Master Silk: Ryū Shōkan Musume | December 4, 1992 | Gimmick House | Gimmick House |
| Dragon Pink: The Zero Castle | July 24, 1992 | Striker | Striker |
| Dragon Slayer | September 1985 | Nihon Falcom | Square Co. |
| Dragon Slayer: The Legend of Heroes | 1990 | Nihon Falcom | Nihon Falcom |
| Dragon Slayer: The Legend of Heroes II | 1992 | Nihon Falcom | Nihon Falcom |
| Dragons of Flame | January 1992 | U.S. Gold | Pony Canyon |
| Dragon Sōseiki | November 7, 1992 | Basho House | Basho House |
| DragonStrike | 1992 | Westwood Associates | Pony Canyon |
| Dragon Wars | December 12, 1990 | Interplay Productions | StarCraft, Inc. |
| Dragoon Armor for Adult | June 8, 1989 | FairyTale | FairyTale |
| Drakkhen | March 15, 1991 | Infogrames | Epic/Sony Inc. |
| Dream Program System SG | August 15, 1990 | Alice Soft | Alice Soft |
| Drol | 1986 | | Soft Pro International |
| Dr. Stop! | April 15, 1992 | Alice Soft | Alice Soft |
| Dual Targets: The 4th Unit | May 1989 | Data West | Data West |
| Duel | May 12, 1990 | Kure Software Koubou | Kure Software Koubou |
| Dungeon Hack | March 31, 1995 | DreamForge Intertainment | Right Stuff Corp. |
| Dungeon Harlem | July 26, 1991 | Heart Soft | Heart Soft |
| Dungeon Master | February 9, 1990 | FTL Games | Victor Musical Industries |
| Dungeon Master II: Skullkeep | December 23, 1993 | FTL Games | Victor Entertainment |
| Earl Weaver Baseball | 1988 | Mirage Graphics | Electronic Arts |
| Early Kingdom | July 24, 1992 | Kure Software Koubou | C² World |
| Edge | January 15, 1993 | Technical Group Laboratory | Technical Group Laboratory |
| Eikan wa Kimi ni: Kōkō Yakyū Zenkoku Taikai | July 19, 1990 | Artdink Corporation | Artdink Corporation |
| Eisei Meijin II | May 17, 1991 | Konami | Konami |
| Eisei Meijin III | September 4, 1992 | Konami | Konami |
| Eiyū Shigan: Gal Act Heroism | June 23, 1994 | Microcabin | Microcabin |
| Ekudorado: Romgreich inner Spiegel | February 14, 1997 | Black Package | Black Package |
| El Dominion | 1994 | | Japan Clary Business |
| El Dorado Denki | February 1985 | | Enix |
| Electric Device | October 7, 1994 | Janis | Janis |
| Elemental Ō | June 17, 1994 | Apple Pie | Apple Pie |
| Elite Plus | March 7, 1992 | Realtime Games | MicroProse |
| Elm Knight | November 20, 1992 | Microcabin | Microcabin |
| Elves | October 9, 1992 | You-En-Tai | You-En-Tai |
| Elvira: Mistress of the Dark | November 27, 1992 | Horror Soft | Acclaim Entertainment |
| Emerald Densetsu | June 18, 1990 | ZigZag | New System House Oh! |
| Emerald Dragon | December 1989 | Glodia | Basho House |
| Emit | September 30, 1994 | Koei | Koei |
| Enchanter: Wakaki Madōshi no Shiren | March 26, 1993 | Infocom, SystemSoft | SystemSoft |
| Engage Errands II: Hikari o Ninau Mono | February 10, 1995 | Ponytail Soft | Ponytail Soft |
| Engage Errands: Miwaku no Shitotachi | September 15, 1993 | Ponytail Soft | Ponytail Soft |
| Epic | December 10, 1993 | Digital Image Design | Imagineer |
| Erotic Baka Novel: Denwa no Bell ga... | August 17, 1993 | Cocktail Soft | Cocktail Soft |
| Escalation '95: Oneesama-tte Yonde Ii desu ka? | March 4, 1995 | Fairy Dust | Fairy Dust |
| Escape | 1996 | May-Be Soft | May-Be Soft |
| Escape from Rungistan | 1986 | Sirius Software | StarCraft, Inc. |
| Es no Hōteishiki | May 24, 1996 | Abogado Powers | Abogado Powers |
| E.S.P. | 1994 | A-Inn | A-Inn |
| Estoria | March 11, 1993 | Soft Plan | Soft Plan |
| Etemible: Tenjō Mukyū | January 27, 1995 | Glodia | Glodia |
| EVE Burst Error | 1995 | C's Ware | C's Ware |
| Exile | December 1988 | Renovation Game | Telenet Japan |
| Exodus: Ultima III | November 25, 1985 | ORIGIN Systems | StarCraft, Inc. |
| Expedition Amazon | November 1984 | Penguin Software | StarCraft, Inc. |
| Exterlien | July 26, 1990 | D.O. Corp. | D.O. Corp. |
| Eye of the Beholder | June 18, 1992 | Westwood Associates | Pony Canyon |
| Eye of the Beholder II: The Legend of Darkmoon | November 19, 1993 | Westwood Associates | Capcom |
| Eye of the Beholder III: Assault on Myth Drannor | November 30, 1994 | Strategic Simulations, Inc. | Ving Co. |
| F-117A Nighthawk Stealth Fighter 2.0 | March 11, 1994 | MicroProse | MicroProse |
| F-15 Strike Eagle | May 1989 | MicroProse | SystemSoft |
| F-15 Strike Eagle II | October 25, 1990 | MPS Labs | MicroProse |
| F-15 Strike Eagle III | October 6, 1995 | MPS Labs | Spectrum HoloByte |
| F-19 Stealth Fighter | April 29, 1992 | MicroProse | MicroProse |
| F29 Retaliator | October 30, 1992 | Digital Image Design | Imagineer |
| Faladia | April 28, 1994 | Kinpukurin | Kinpukurin |
| Fantasian | 1985 | Xtalsoft | Xtalsoft |
| Farland Story | October 15, 1993 | Technical Group Laboratory | Technical Group Laboratory |
| Farland Story: Daichi no Kizuna | March 17, 1995 | Technical Group Laboratory | Technical Group Laboratory |
| Farland Story Denki: Arc Ō no Ensei | February 10, 1994 | Technical Group Laboratory | Technical Group Laboratory |
| Farland Story: Juuou no Akashi | October 11, 1995 | Technical Group Laboratory | Technical Group Laboratory |
| Farland Story: Kamigami no Isen | July 21, 1995 | Technical Group Laboratory | Technical Group Laboratory |
| Farland Story: Shirogane no Tsubasa | November 11, 1994 | Technical Group Laboratory | Technical Group Laboratory |
| Farland Story: Tenshi no Namida | July 15, 1994 | Technical Group Laboratory | Technical Group Laboratory |
| Fatal Relations | November 22, 1993 | C's Ware | C's Ware |
| Fermion: Mirai kara no Hōmonsha | December 22, 1995 | Silky's | Silky's |
| Ferrari Formula One | October 29, 1988 | | Electronic Arts |
| Feti | March 18, 1994 | Cat's Pro | Cat's Pro |
| Figure: Ubawareta Hōkago | September 29, 1995 | Silky's | Silky's |
| File | November 30, 1994 | May-Be Soft | May-Be Soft |
| Filsnown: Hikari to Toki | August 3, 1995 | Leaf | Leaf |
| Final Lolita: Darkside of Software | November 1985 | PSK | PSK |
| The Fire Crystal | 1984 | Bullet-Proof Software | Bullet-Proof Software |
| First Queen | 1988 | Kure Software Koubou | Kure Software Koubou |
| First Queen II: Sabaku no Joō | 1990 | Kure Software Koubou | Kure Software Koubou |
| First Queen III | 1993 | Kure Software Koubou | Kure Software Koubou |
| First Queen IV | 1994 | Kure Software Koubou | Kure Software Koubou |
| Flame Zapper Kotsujin | 1996 | CO2-PRO | CO2-PRO |
| Flashback: The Quest for Identity | April 22, 1994 | Delphine Software International | Victor Entertainment |
| Fleet Defender | February 23, 1995 | MicroProse | MicroProse |
| Flight Simulator II | 1986 | Sublogic | Sublogic |
| FlixMix | April 28, 1995 | Celeris Inc. | StarCraft, Inc. |
| Foreigner | November 25, 1991 | Communication Group Plum | Communication Group Plum |
| Foresight Dolly | November 11, 1994 | Right Stuff Corp. | Right Stuff Corp. |
| Fortress | February 16, 1989 | Iconographics | Cross Media Soft |
| Four Flush | April 29, 1993 | Agumix | Agumix |
| Foxy | February 16, 1990 | ELF Corporation | ELF Corporation |
| Foxy 2 | April 12, 1991 | ELF Corporation | ELF Corporation |
| Fray in Magical Adventure | 1991 | Microcabin | Microcabin |
| Free Will: Knight of Argent | 1992 | Kinpukurin | Kinpukurin |
| Fukkatsusai: Asticaya no Majo | September 25, 1992 | Grocer | Grocer |
| Fushigi no Umi no Nadia | March 27, 1992 | Gainax | Gainax |
| Future Wars: Adventures in Time | June 24, 1991 | Delphine Software International | StarCraft, Inc. |
| Fuzoroi no Lemon | January 21, 1994 | Soft House Bon bee Bon Bon | Soft House Bon bee Bon Bon |
| Gaias Lord | 1993 | Orange House | Orange House |
| Gaiflame | December 16, 1987 | Masaya | NCS Corporation |
| Gakuen Bomber | April 28, 1994 | Active Software | Active Software |
| Gakuen King: Hidehiko Gakkō o Tsukuru | June 7, 1996 | Alice Soft | Alice Soft |
| Gakuen Monogatari '93: The Instinct | December 3, 1993 | Foresight | Foresight |
| Gakuen Monogatari: Ikenai Hōkago | June 17, 1993 | Peach Soft | Peach Soft |
| Gakuen Senki: Kyōfu no Puppet Keikaku | April 15, 1994 | Foresight | Foresight |
| Gakuen Senshi: Sailor Fighter | April 15, 1994 | Peach Soft | Peach Soft |
| Gakuen Sodom: Kyōshitsu no Mesudoreitachi | September 8, 1995 | PIL | PIL |
| Gakuen Toshi Z | May 1991 | Striker | Striker |
| Galactic Wars | February 1983 | Nihon Falcom | Nihon Falcom |
| Galaga | April 1985 | Namco | Dempa Shimbunsha |
| Gal Pani | 1995 | | Creo I |
| Gal Pani II | December 14, 1996 | Scio Co. | MYCOM |
| Gambler Queen's Cup | July 22, 1994 | Queen Soft | Queen Soft |
| Gandhara: Buddha no Seisen | 1988 | | Enix |
| GaoGao! 1st: Radical Sequence | January 7, 1994 | Four-Nine | Four-Nine |
| GaoGao! 2nd: Pandora no Mori | April 8, 1994 | Four-Nine | Four-Nine |
| GaoGao! 3rd: Wild Force | October 29, 1994 | Four-Nine | Four-Nine |
| GaoGao! 4th: Canaan - Yakusoku no Chi | April 11, 1997 | Four-Nine | Four-Nine |
| Gaplus | 1985 | Namco | Carry Lab |
| Garudius '95 | 1995 | CO2-PRO | CO2-PRO |
| Gaudi: Barcelona no Kaze | June 1, 1989 | Wolf Team | Wolf Team |
| Gemfire | December 21, 1991 | Koei | Koei |
| Gemstone Warrior | March 1986 | Paradigm Creators | StarCraft, Inc. |
| Gendai Daisenryaku | December 1985 | SystemSoft | SystemSoft |
| Genesis: Beyond the Revelation | October 1985 | Square Co. | Square Co. |
| Genghis Khan | December 1987 | Koei | Koei |
| Genghis Khan II: Clan of the Gray Wolf | October 1, 1992 | Koei | Koei |
| Gensei Fūkyō Den | 1994 | Compile | Compile |
| Gensei Kaitō Den | 1995 | Compile | Compile |
| Gensei Kitan: Disc Saga III | January 4, 1995 | Compile | Compile |
| Geo Slave: Aidorei no Shōzō | November 15, 1996 | Sorcière | Sorcière |
| Gibo: Sayaka | August 26, 1994 | Red-Zone | FairyTale |
| Giga Mortion | July 29, 1994 | Inter Heart | Inter Heart |
| Ginga Eiyū Densetsu | April 14, 1989 | Bothtec, Inc | Bothtec, Inc |
| Ginga Eiyū Densetsu II | October 5, 1990 | Bothtec, Inc | Bothtec, Inc |
| Ginga Eiyū Densetsu III | November 6, 1992 | Bothtec, Inc | Bothtec, Inc |
| Ginga Eiyū Densetsu IV | December 9, 1994 | Bothtec, Inc | Bothtec, Inc |
| GiriGiri Paradise | January 23, 1998 | May-Be Soft | May-Be Soft |
| Girls Paradise: Rakuen no Tenshitachi | August 24, 1989 | Great Co. | Great Co. |
| Giten Megami Tensei: Tokyo Mokushiroku | April 4, 1997 | Atlus | ASCII Corporation |
| Gize! XIX | November 22, 1991 | FairyTale | FairyTale |
| Gloria | 1996 | C's Ware | Himeya Soft |
| Gods | September 25, 1992 | Bitmap Brothers | PCM Complete |
| Goh II | September 1992 | Wolf Team | Wolf Team |
| Goice | December 15, 1994 | Tenshindo | Tenshindo |
| Gokko | July 14, 1993 | Mink Co. | Mink Co. |
| Gokuraku Mandala | October 29, 1993 | FairyTale | FairyTale |
| Gokuraku Tengoku: Omemie no Maki | September 1990 | Shanbara | Shinjitsu Pro |
| Great Naval Battles Vol. II: Guadalcanal 1942-43 | July 28, 1995 | IO Design Group | SystemSoft |
| Grounseed | June 7, 1996 | Studio Twinkle | Exit |
| Guernica | February 9, 1996 | Back Spin | Back Spin |
| GunBlaze | October 21, 1994 | Active Software | Active Software |
| Gunship | May 2, 1989 | MicroProse | MicroProse |
| Gunship 2000 | October 15, 1993 | MPS Labs | MicroProse |
| H+ | July 23, 1994 | Desire | Desire |
| Hacchake Ayayo-san | March 16, 1989 | HARD Software | HARD Software |
| Hacchake Ayayo-san 2: Ikenai Holiday | September 14, 1990 | HARD Software | HARD Software |
| Hacchake Ayayo-san 3: Watashi, Icchatta n' desu | September 20, 1991 | HARD Software | HARD Software |
| Half Moon ni Kawaru made: Ramiya Ryo no Nijiiro Tamatebako | April 28, 1994 | Cocktail Soft | Cocktail Soft |
| Half-Pipe | September 29, 1993 | Aypio | Aypio |
| Hamlet | November 19, 1993 | Panther Software | Panther Software |
| Hana no Kioku | June 9, 1995 | Foster | Foster |
| Harenochi Munasawagi | November 10, 1995 | Cocktail Soft | Cocktail Soft |
| Harlem Blade: The Greatest of All Time | 1996 | GIGA | GIGA |
| Harpoon | June 25, 1993 | Applied Computing Services, Three-Sixty Pacific | Imagineer |
| Harpoon: The Next Mission | December 17, 1993 | Applied Computing Services, Three-Sixty Pacific | Imagineer |
| Harukanaru Augusta | October 20, 1989 | T&E Soft | T&E Soft |
| Hatris | October 18, 1991 | Bullet-Proof Software | Bullet-Proof Software |
| Hatsukoi Monogatari | March 5, 1993 | Game Technopolis | Game Technopolis |
| Hayate: The Battle | 1994 | Altacia | Altacia |
| Hercequary | 1994 | ZyX Inc. | ZyX Inc. |
| Heroes of the Lance | October 1989 | U.S. Gold | Pony Canyon |
| Hero's Quest: So You Want to Be a Hero | April 12, 1991 | Sierra On-Line | Sierra On-Line |
| Herzog | 1988 | Technosoft | Technosoft |
| H.H.G.: Heart Heat Girls | December 2, 1993 | Cat's Pro | Cat's Pro |
| Hiiro no Shimai | December 15, 1995 | Janis | Janis |
| Hillsfar | November 21, 1990 | Westwood Associates | Pony Canyon |
| Himitsu no Hanazono | 1992 | | Game Technopolis |
| Hinadori no Saezuri | March 28, 1997 | Studio B-Room | Studio B-Room |
| Hiōden | June 26, 1992 | Wolf Team | Wolf Team |
| Hiōden II | November 16, 1993 | Wolf Team | Wolf Team |
| Hi-Res Adventure #0: Mission Asteroid | April 1983 | Sierra On-Line | StarCraft, Inc. |
| Hi-Res Adventure #1: Mystery House | April 1983 | Sierra On-Line | StarCraft, Inc. |
| Hi-Res Adventure #2: The Wizard and the Princess | May 1983 | Sierra On-Line | StarCraft, Inc. |
| Hi-Res Adventure #3: Cranston Manor | October 1983 | Sierra On-Line | StarCraft, Inc. |
| Hi-Res Adventure #4: Ulysses and the Golden Fleece | December 1983 | Sierra On-Line | StarCraft, Inc. |
| Hi-Res Adventure #6: The Dark Crystal | January 1984 | Sierra On-Line | StarCraft, Inc. |
| His Name is Diamond | 1997 | Pis-Ton Soft | Pis-Ton Soft |
| Hokkaidō Rensa Satsujin: Okhotsk ni Kiyu | February 8, 1985 | Armor Project | Login Soft |
| Hokuto no Ken | 1986 | | Enix |
| Hōma Hunter Lime | June 10, 1993 | Silence | Brother Kougyou |
| The Horde | April 28, 1995 | Toys for Bob | Arrow Micro-Techs |
| Horny Sweeper: Kōshoku Shikakenin | February 17, 1995 | Mugen | Mugen |
| Horny Sweeper 2: Joshikō Kiki Ippatsu | July 14, 1995 | Mugen | Mugen |
| Hoshi no Suna Monogatari | 1991 | D.O. Corp. | D.O. Corp. |
| Hoshi no Suna Monogatari 2 | 1992 | D.O. Corp. | D.O. Corp. |
| Hoshi no Suna Monogatari 3 | 1995 | D.O. Corp. | D.O. Corp. |
| Hotel Wars | November 1986 | Bothtec, Inc. | Bothtec, Inc. |
| Hot Step Jump | December 18, 1993 | Forest | Forest |
| Houtei Raoyui II | May 17, 1996 | Queen Soft | Queen Soft |
| Hydlide | 1985 | T&E Soft | T&E Soft |
| Hydlide 3: Special Version | September 9, 1989 | T&E Soft | T&E Soft |
| Hyōryū | September 13, 1996 | Illusion | Illusion |
| Idol Project | September 22, 1994 | KSS | KSS |
| Idol Project 2 | December 22, 1995 | KSS | KSS |
| if | April 29, 1993 | Active Software | Active Software |
| if 2 | October 16, 1993 | Active Software | Active Software |
| if 3 | March 3, 1995 | Active Software | Active Software |
| Igo II | November 1988 | ASCII Corporation | ASCII Corporation |
| Igo Seiten | February 19, 1993 | Home Data | Home Data |
| Ikazuchi no Senshi Raidi | September 20, 1994 | ZyX Inc. | ZyX Inc. |
| Ikazuchi no Senshi Raidi 2 | 1995 | ZyX Inc. | ZyX Inc. |
| Ikenie: Kyōraku no Shinden | 1994 | Cat's Pro | Cat's Pro |
| Illumina! | December 5, 1990 | Cocktail Soft | Cocktail Soft |
| Illusion City (Genei Toshi) | January 18, 1992 | Microcabin | Microcabin |
| Image | July 10, 1992 | Software House Parsley | Software House Parsley |
| Image 2 | April 27, 1993 | Software House Parsley | Software House Parsley |
| Immoral Study | September 20, 1996 | Scoop Software Productions | Scoop Software Productions |
| Immoral Study 2 | October 18, 1996 | Scoop Software Productions | Scoop Software Productions |
| Immoral Study: Scenario 3 | November 22, 1996 | Scoop Software Productions | Scoop Software Productions |
| The Incredible Machine | May 26, 1994 | Jeff Tunnell Productions | Cybelle |
| Inherit the Earth: Quest for the Orb | July 14, 1995 | The Dreamers Guild | StarCraft, Inc. |
| Inindo: Way of the Ninja | September 27, 1991 | Koei | Koei |
| Injū Gakuen: La★Blue Girl | March 24, 1994 | Dez Climax | Dez Climax |
| Injū Genmu | December 15, 1993 | Ringer Bell | Ringer Bell |
| Injū Genmu II: Brain Burst!! | April 28, 1994 | Ringer Bell | Ringer Bell |
| Inma Seifuku-gari | July 14, 1995 | AIL | AIL |
| Ippatsu Jang! | July 12, 1995 | May-Be Soft | May-Be Soft |
| Iris Tei Serenade | November 13, 1992 | Agumix | Agumix |
| Irium | June 11, 1993 | Orange House | Orange House |
| Iron Assault | 1995 | Graffiti | Imagineer |
| Isaku | August 25, 1995 | ELF Corporation | ELF Corporation |
| Ishidō: The Way of Stones | April 13, 1990 | Software Resources International | ASCII Corporation |
| Ishin no Arashi | June 1988 | Koei | Koei |
| Itsuka Dokoka de: Erotic Baka Novel Series 2 | April 28, 1995 | Cocktail Soft | Cocktail Soft |
| Jack: Haitoku no Megami | November 30, 1995 | Silky's | Silky's |
| Jack Nicklaus' Greatest 18 Holes of Major Championship Golf | August 1989 | Sculptured Software | Cross Media Soft |
| Jan Jaka Jan | November 23, 1992 | ELF Corporation | ELF Corporation |
| Jankirō | February 25, 1994 | Red-Zone | FairyTale |
| Janō Tōryūmon | December 6, 1989 | Game Arts | Game Arts |
| J.B. Harold 3: D.C. Connection | May 13, 1989 | Riverhillsoft | Riverhillsoft |
| Jealousy | July 14, 1995 | Inter Heart | Inter Heart |
| Jesus II | September 22, 1991 | Enix | Enix |
| Jet | March 1989 | Sublogic | Sublogic |
| Jikū Sōsakan: Hayate | 1994 | Altacia | Altacia |
| Jikū Sōsakan Pretty Angel: Misty Flash | October 14, 1994 | Peppermint Kids | Peppermint Kids |
| Jinn: Eternal Hero | February 9, 1994 | Tenshindo | Tenshindo |
| Joker | September 5, 1991 | Birdy Soft | Birdy Soft |
| Joker II | February 14, 1992 | Birdy Soft | Birdy Soft |
| Jonason: Cugutu no Mai | April 21, 1994 | XYZ | XYZ |
| Joshua | 1992 | Panther Software | Panther Software |
| J.R.R. Tolkien's The Lord of the Rings, Vol. I | October 30, 1991 | Interplay Productions | StarCraft, Inc. |
| J.R.R. Tolkien's The Lord of the Rings, Vol. II: The Two Towers | April 23, 1993 | Interplay Productions | StarCraft, Inc. |
| Jump Bug | 1996 | Alpha Denshi, Hoei Sangyo | Mindware |
| JYB | May 14, 1993 | Cocktail Soft | Cocktail Soft |
| Kabul Spy | May 1984 | | StarCraft, Inc. |
| Kagaku Ninjatai Gacchaman | 1994 | Family Soft | Family Soft |
| Kaien | August 15, 1998 | | |
| Kaiketsu Nikki | October 14, 1994 | Ange | Ange |
| Kakinoki Shogi | April 22, 1994 | ASCII Corporation | ASCII Corporation |
| Kakutō Musume Ryoko | November 20, 1993 | Musumeya | Musumeya |
| Kakyūsei | June 7, 1996 | ELF Corporation | ELF Corporation |
| Kanako | February 23, 1996 | Red-Zone | FairyTale |
| Kankin | May 18, 1995 | Illusion | Illusion |
| Karateka | November 1988 | | Broderbund |
| Karei naru Jinsei: Mina-san no okage desu | December 27, 1991 | FairyTale | FairyTale |
| Karei naru Jinsei 2 | November 22, 1984 | FairyTale | FairyTale |
| Kawarazakike no Ichizoku | September 17, 1992 | Silky's | Silky's |
| Kekkō Kamen: O-Shioki Paradise no Maki | April 8, 1994 | Dynamic Production | Dynamic Production |
| Kekkō Kamen 2: O-Shioki Densetsu no Maki | June 15, 1995 | Dynamic Production | Dynamic Production |
| Ki | November 1, 1991 | Soft Plan | Soft Plan |
| Kigen: Kagayaki no Hasha | December 12, 1991 | Riverhillsoft | Riverhillsoft |
| Kikō Shidan: Panzer Division | May 1990 | Artdink Corporation | Artdink Corporation |
| Kimagure Orange Road: Natsu no Mirage | September 1988 | Microcabin | Microcabin |
| Kimi Dake ni Ai o... | August 1991 | Game Technopolis | Game Technopolis |
| Kinbaku no Yakata | September 8, 1995 | XYZ | XYZ |
| King Flappy | September 15, 1985 | dB-SOFT | dB-SOFT |
| King's Bounty | July 8, 1994 | New World Computing | StarCraft, Inc. |
| King's Quest V | November 9, 1991 | Sierra On-Line | Sierra On-Line |
| Kirishima Shinryōshitsu no Gogo | August 11, 1995 | May-Be Soft | May-Be Soft |
| Kishi Densetsu | December 26, 1994 | Warlock | Warlock |
| Kisō Shinden: Gen-Kaiser | February 10, 1995 | Technical Group Laboratory | Technical Group Laboratory |
| Kiss of Murder | 1988 | | Riverhillsoft |
| Kitahei | 1988 | SPS | SPS |
| Kitōshima Joshi Keimusho | November 2, 1994 | Illusion | Illusion |
| Kiwame | April 23, 1992 | LOG | LOG |
| Kiwame II | December 5, 1993 | LOG | LOG |
| Kizuato | July 26, 1996 | Leaf | Leaf |
| Klax | December 14, 1990 | Atari | Hudson Soft |
| Knights of the Sky | June 12, 1993 | MPS Labs | MicroProse |
| Knights of Xentar | December 14, 1991 | ELF Corporation | ELF Corporation |
| Koihime: Mystic Princess | May 26, 1995 | Silky's | Silky's |
| Kōkō Kyōshi: Sei Erika Jogakuin Hen | January 29, 1994 | Wishbone | Wishbone |
| Kōnai Shasei 1: Yo ni mo H na Monogatari | July 26, 1991 | FairyTale | FairyTale |
| KO Seiki Beast Sanjūshi: Gaia no Fukkatsu | December 22, 1992 | Matrix | Matrix |
| Kōsoku: Yorokobi no Juice | July 28, 1995 | Persian Soft | Persian Soft |
| Kotetsu no Daibōken | 1996 | T2 | T2 |
| Kousoku Chojin | April 26, 1996 | Foster | Foster |
| Kurayami | June 26, 1996 | Melody | Melody |
| Kuroneko-kan | July 9, 1993 | Fairy Dust | Fairy Dust |
| Kuro no Danshō: The Literary Fragment | July 14, 1995 | Abogado Powers | Abogado Powers |
| Kuro no Ken | February 28, 1995 | Forest | Forest |
| Kurutta Kajitsu | May 1, 1992 | FairyTale | FairyTale |
| Kusuriyubi no Kyōkasho | April 5, 1996 | Active Software | Active Software |
| Kyarukan: Super Break Down!! | 1990 | ToyPops | ToyPops |
| Kyōhaku | April 27, 1996 | AIL | AIL |
| Kyōiku Jisshū: Joshi Kōsei Maniacs | December 13, 1996 | Tetratech | Tetratech |
| Kyōran no Ginga: Schwarzschild | December 9, 1988 | Kogado Studio | Kogado Studio |
| Lands of Lore: The Throne of Chaos | December 10, 1994 | Westwood Studios | StarCraft, Inc. |
| Laplace no Ma | 1987 | Humming Bird Soft | Humming Bird Soft |
| Laser Squad | February 20, 1993 | Target Games Limited | C² Bros Import |
| Last Armageddon | 1990 | BrainGrey | BrainGrey |
| Last Guardian: Jūkyō no Shugosha | January 17, 1995 | Studio Inferno | Anjin |
| Last Guardian 2: Yomi no Fūin | July 12, 1996 | Studio Inferno | Anjin |
| Las Vegas | 1986 | On-Line Systems | StarCraft, Inc. |
| Law of the West | 1987 | Accolade, Inc. | Pony Canyon |
| The Legend of Heroes III: Shiroki Majo | March 18, 1994 | Nihon Falcom Corp. | Nihon Falcom Corp. |
| The Legend of Heroes IV: Akai Shizuku | May 24, 1996 | Nihon Falcom Corp. | Nihon Falcom Corp. |
| The Legend of Kyrandia: Fables and Fiends | February 15, 1994 | Westwood Studios | StarCraft, Inc. |
| The Legend of Kyrandia: Hand of Fate | October 14, 1995 | Westwood Studios | StarCraft, Inc. |
| Legends of Valour | November 27, 1993 | Synthetic Dimensions | Ving Co. |
| L Elle | June 23, 1991 | ELF Corporation | ELF Corporation |
| Lemmings | December 17, 1991 | DMA Design | Imagineer |
| Lemon Angel | July 21, 1995 | Fairy Dust | Fairy Dust |
| Lemon Angel: Sakurai Tomo no Speed Game | 1990 | M.I.N | M.I.N |
| L'Empereur | October 27, 1990 | Koei | Koei |
| Lesser Mern | April 28, 1992 | Panther Software | Panther Software |
| Liberty or Death | September 27, 1993 | Koei | Koei |
| Libros de Chilam Balam | November 7, 1992 | Right Stuff Corp. | Right Stuff Corp. |
| Life & Death | November 28, 1991 | The Software Toolworks | Ving Co. |
| Life & Death II: The Brain | November 27, 1992 | The Software Toolworks | Arrow Micro-Techs |
| Lightning Vaccus: The Knight of Iron | March 1989 | NCS Corporation | NCS Corporation |
| Links 386 Pro | February 10, 1995 | Access Software | Cybelle |
| Lipstick Adventure | October 15, 1988 | FairyTale | FairyTale |
| Lipstick Adventure 2 | December 14, 1990 | FairyTale | FairyTale |
| Lipstick Adventure 3 | April 23, 1993 | FairyTale | FairyTale |
| Little Computer People | December 5, 1987 | Activision | Pony Canyon |
| Lode Runner | October 30, 1983 | Broderbund | SystemSoft |
| Lodoss-Tō Senki: Fukujinzuke | December 1989 | Humming Bird Soft | Humming Bird Soft |
| Lodoss-Tō Senki: Fukujinzuke 2 | August 8, 1992 | Humming Bird Soft | Humming Bird Soft |
| Lodoss-Tō Senki: Fukujinzuke 3 | February 19, 1993 | Humming Bird Soft | Humming Bird Soft |
| Log!cal | March 12, 1993 | | ASCII Corporation |
| Loop: Iginahi no Kaikiten | September 8, 1995 | Grocer | Grocer |
| Loopz | June 21, 1991 | Audiogenic Software | Broderbund |
| Lord Monarch | March 21, 1991 | Nihon Falcom | Nihon Falcom |
| Lord of Wars | March 1988 | SystemSoft | SystemSoft |
| Lost Eden | January 26, 1996 | Cryo Interactive | Victor Entertainment |
| Love Escalator | April 17, 1998 | Umitsuki Production | Umitsuki Production |
| Love Phantom | April 19, 1996 | Love Gun | Love Gun |
| Love Potion | February 25, 1994 | C's Ware | Himeya Soft |
| Lunatic Dawn | October 1, 1993 | Artdink Corporation | Artdink Corporation |
| Lunatic Dawn II | September 30, 1994 | Artdink Corporation | Artdink Corporation |
| M1 Tank Platoon | October 23, 1992 | MPS Labs | MicroProse |
| Madō Gakuin R | July 28, 1994 | Foresight | Foresight |
| Madoll | September 13, 1996 | Fairy Dust | Fairy Dust |
| Madō Monogatari 1-2-3 | 1991 | Compile | Compile |
| Madō Monogatari: ARS | 1993 | Compile | Compile |
| Madō Monogatari: Michikusa Ibun | 1994 | Compile | Compile |
| Mad●Paradox | August 28, 1992 | Queen Soft | Queen Soft |
| Magical Panic | July 12, 1996 | Pearl Soft | Pearl Soft |
| Magical Squadron | December 20, 1996 | Kogado Studio | Kogado Studio |
| Magical Story Series: Majokko Kumi | November 14, 1991 | Family Soft | Family Soft |
| Magical Story Series Part 2: Mahō Shōjo Rina | August 6, 1992 | Family Soft | Family Soft |
| The Magic Candle | April 25, 1991 | Mindcraft | StarCraft, Inc. |
| Magic Knight | December 11, 1992 | NIC | NIC |
| Magic++: Nariyuki Makase no Nijiiro Yūsha | December 24, 1993 | Cosmos Computer | Cosmos Computer |
| Mahjong Bishōjo Den: Ripple | December 9, 1994 | Foresight | Foresight |
| Mahjong Clinic: Zōkangō | December 26, 1990 | Home Data | Home Data |
| Mahjong de Pon! | February 18, 1994 | Active Software | Active Software |
| Mahjong Fantasia | June 6, 1992 | Active Software | Active Software |
| Mahjong Fantasia 2 | August 6, 1993 | Active Software | Active Software |
| Mahjong Fantasia the 3rd Stage | August 25, 1995 | Active Software | Active Software |
| Mahjong Houtei Raoyui | April 28, 1995 | Queen Soft | Queen Soft |
| Mahjong Ō Densetsu | June 26, 1992 | Nichibutsu | Nichibutsu |
| Mahjong Princess Go! Go!: Chiruru the Mahjong Princess | June 29, 1995 | Ringer Bell | Ringer Bell |
| Mahjong Sangokushi Engi | March 19, 1993 | SystemSoft | SystemSoft |
| Mahjong Taikai | 1985 | Koei | Koei |
| Mahjong Vanilla Syndrome | January 15, 1993 | Nichibutsu | Nichibutsu |
| Mahjong Yūenchi | November 20, 1991 | Home Data | Home Data |
| Mahō no Princess Minky Momo | September 1, 1995 | Wishbone | Wishbone |
| Mahō no Tenshi Creamy Mami: Futatsu No Sekai | November 30, 1995 | Wishbone | Wishbone |
| Mahō Shōjo B-Ko | March 15, 1996 | Scoop Software Productions | Scoop Software Productions |
| Mahō Shōjo Fancy Coco | November 22, 1996 | Planning Office WADA | Planning Office WADA |
| Mai | December 14, 1991 | FairyTale | FairyTale |
| Maison Ikkoku: Kanketsuhen | 1988 | Microcabin | Microcabin |
| Maison Ikkoku: Omoide no Photograph | December 10, 1986 | Microcabin | Microcabin |
| Majo-gari no Yoru ni | October 13, 1995 | AIL | AIL |
| Majoriko: Inbikai | February 1989 | Natsume | Natsume |
| Makyōden | August 27, 1992 | Nihon Create | Nihon Create |
| Manami no Doko made Iku no? | July 13, 1991 | Wendy Magazine | Wendy Magazine |
| Mandala Keichizoku | 1995 | Foresight | Foresight |
| Manhattan Requiem | 1987 | Riverhillsoft | Riverhillsoft |
| The Manhole | December 1, 1990 | Cyan, Inc. | Tonkinhouse |
| Manji: PSY Yūki | March 22, 1995 | PSD | PSD |
| Marble Cooking | December 16, 1994 | Negative | Negative |
| Marble Madness | March 30, 1991 | Atari | Home Data |
| Märchen Veil I | October 1985 | System Sacom | System Sacom |
| Märchen Veil II | June 14, 1986 | System Sacom | System Sacom |
| Marginal Points | 1995 | Lunar Soft | Lunar Soft |
| Marginal Storys | March 31, 1993 | Forest | Forest |
| Marine Buster | March 18, 1993 | Silky's | Silky's |
| Marine Rouge | October 1995 | Discovery | Discovery |
| Marines: Gairom no Fūin | July 25, 1994 | Hervest | Hervest |
| Marion | March 31, 1994 | May-Be Soft | May-Be Soft |
| Marionette Mind | August 27, 1993 | Studio Milk | Studio Milk |
| Martial Age | March 27, 1992 | Tenshindo | Tenshindo |
| Maryū Gakuen: Kegasareta Nikutai | December 16, 1994 | Peach Soft | Peach Soft |
| Maryū Gakuen: Nerawareta Shitai | July 16, 1994 | Peach Soft | Peach Soft |
| Ma Saiko Jan | December 27, 1991 | Cosmos Computer | Cosmos Computer |
| Mashō Denki: La Valeur | November 30, 1989 | Kogado Studio | Kogado Studio |
| Mashō no Kao | January 11, 1996 | Mink Co. | Mink Co. |
| Masquerade | November 1985 | | StarCraft, Inc. |
| The Masquerade | November 25, 1994 | Janis | Janis |
| Master of Magic | December 6, 1996 | SimTex | Locus Company |
| Master of Monsters | 1989 | SystemSoft | SystemSoft |
| Master of Monsters Final: Rings of Twilight | November 1992 | SystemSoft | SystemSoft |
| Masters: Harukanaru Augusta 2 | September 10, 1994 | T&E Soft | T&E Soft |
| Maten Gakuen: Jigoku no Love Love Daisakusen | December 13, 1993 | Birdy Soft | Birdy Soft |
| Mayumi | October 9, 1992 | Cocktail Soft | Cocktail Soft |
| Mech Brigade | February 21, 1991 | Strategic Simulations, Inc. | Cross Media Soft |
| MechWarrior | March 12, 1993 | Dynamix | Cross Media Soft |
| Mega lo Mania | March 19, 1993 | Sensible Software | Imagineer |
| Meikyū Gakuensai: Kyūkōsha no Nazo | October 28, 1994 | Wishbone | Wishbone |
| Memories: Shiroi Yozora ni Mau Tenshi | November 1995 | Petit | Petit |
| Menzoberranzan | October 27, 1995 | DreamForge Intertainment | KSS |
| Mercurius Pretty | December 9, 1994 | Headroom, Long Shot | NEC |
| Mercury: The Prime Master | December 8, 1990 | Maxima | Maxima |
| Mercury 2: Tales of the Planet | December 6, 1991 | Maxima | Maxima |
| Merry Go Round | March 8, 1996 | Mischief | Mischief |
| Mesuneko Hishoshitsu | December 22, 1995 | Melody | Melody |
| Metajo: Furitsu Metatopology Daigaku Fuzoku Joshi Kōkō SP | March 15, 1996 | R-Force Software | Anjin |
| Metal Eye | April 28, 1993 | ELF Corporation | ELF Corporation |
| Metal Eye 2 | August 31, 1994 | ELF Corporation | ELF Corporation |
| Metal Mover Jastrike | August 11, 1995 | Apple Pie | Apple Pie |
| Metamorph Meena | February 18, 1994 | Apple Pie | Apple Pie |
| Microsoft Flight Simulator 4.0 | October 30, 1992 | Bruce Artwick Organization | Microsoft |
| Microsoft Flight Simulator 5.0 | October 28, 1994 | Bruce Artwick Organization | Microsoft |
| Microsoft Space Simulator | November 10, 1995 | Bruce Artwick Organization | Microsoft |
| Mid-Garts | January 1989 | Wolf Team | Wolf Team |
| Might and Magic Book One: The Secret of the Inner Sanctum | 1988 | New World Computing | StarCraft, Inc. |
| Might and Magic II: Gates to Another World | December 1988 | New World Computing | StarCraft, Inc. |
| Might and Magic III: Isles of Terra | March 27, 1992 | New World Computing | StarCraft, Inc. |
| Might and Magic IV: Clouds of Xeen | September 17, 1993 | New World Computing | StarCraft, Inc. |
| Might and Magic V: Darkside of Xeen | December 23, 1993 | New World Computing | StarCraft, Inc. |
| Miho Premium Collection no.003 | January 28, 1994 | Red-Zone | FairyTale |
| Military Madness | September 17, 1992 | Hudson Soft | SystemSoft |
| Mime | September 29, 1995 | Studio Twinkle | Studio Twinkle |
| Mindbender | December 17, 1991 | | Acclaim Entertainment |
| Mirage | January 24, 1992 | Discovery | Discovery |
| Mirage 2 | December 2, 1994 | Discovery | Discovery |
| Mirai | 1986 | Sein-Soft | Sein-Soft |
| Mirror | December 9, 1992 | Studio Twinkle | Studio Twinkle |
| Mischif | December 23, 1992 | Basement | Basement |
| Mission | March 17, 1995 | Great Co. | Great Co. |
| Misty Blue | July 28, 1990 | | Enix |
| Misty | October 1989 | Data West | Data West |
| Miwaku no Chōsho | December 8, 1995 | Black Package | Black Package |
| Mobile Suit Gundam 0083: Stardust Operation | December 20, 1996 | Family Soft | Family Soft |
| Mobile Suit Gundam: A Year of War | December 17, 1993 | Family Soft | Family Soft |
| Mobile Suit Gundam: Return of Zion | April 9, 1993 | Family Soft | Family Soft |
| Möbius Roid | June 30, 1995 | Silky's | Silky's |
| Mokkoriman RPG | June 24, 1994 | Illusion | Illusion |
| Mokkoriman Series: Rankō Nyotai Tsuri - Mokkoriman no Nani de Nushi Tsuri | August 11, 1995 | Illusion | Illusion |
| Mole Mole | August 1985 | | Cross Media Soft |
| Momoko-chan for Me: Minarai Kangofu-hen | December 1, 1995 | U・Me Soft | U・Me Soft |
| Monzetsu Fighter | May 12, 1995 | Trush | Trush |
| Moonlight-chan Rinshan | February 11, 1993 | D.O. Corp. | D.O. Corp. |
| Moon Light Energy | December 10, 1992 | Inter Heart | Inter Heart |
| Moonlight Energy 2 | December 1, 1995 | Inter Heart | Inter Heart |
| Moonmist | September 11, 1992 | Infocom | SystemSoft |
| Mōryō Senki Madara: Daikongō Rinhen | September 10, 1993 | Kogado Studio | Kogado Studio |
| Mr. Do! | December 13, 1996 | Universal | Mindware |
| Morita Kazuro no Shogi | June 1985 | Ramdom House | Enix |
| Morita Shogi 2 | March 15, 1989 | Ramdom House | Enix |
| Morita Shogi 4 | October 9, 1993 | Ramdom House | Enix |
| Morita Shogi 5 | October 7, 1994 | Ramdom House | Ramdom House |
| Mūgen Hōyō | July 7, 1995 | Alice Soft | Alice Soft |
| Mugen no Shinzō | 1984 | Xtalsoft | Xtalsoft |
| Mugen no Shinzō II | 1986 | Xtalsoft | Xtalsoft |
| Mugen Senshi Valis II | August 5, 1989 | Renovation Game | Telenet Japan |
| Mug-R | April 22, 1994 | Software House Parsley | Software House Parsley |
| Mujintō Monogatari | August 5, 1994 | Mediamuse | KSS |
| Mujintō Monogatari 2 | May 26, 1995 | Mediamuse | KSS |
| Mujintō Monogatari 3: A.D.1999 Tokyo | March 15, 1996 | Mediamuse | KSS |
| Murder Club | 1986 | Riverhillsoft | Riverhillsoft |
| Muteki Keiji Daidageki: Shijō Saidai no Hanzai | October 9, 1990 | Family Soft | Family Soft |
| My Eyes! | September 10, 1992 | Birdy Soft | Birdy Soft |
| Nagakute Amai Yoru: Twilight Zone III | July 1989 | Great Co. | Great Co. |
| Nana Eiyū Monogatari | March 10, 1995 | Himeya Soft | Himeya Soft |
| Nana Eiyū Monogatari II | December 22, 1995 | Himeya Soft | Himeya Soft |
| Nazo Puyo | November 11, 1995 | Compile | Compile |
| Necronomicon | 1994 | FairyTale | FairyTale |
| Neko Mahjong | January 26, 1996 | Sea Lion | Sea Lion |
| Neko Mamma EX | May 21, 1993 | Four-Nine | Four-Nine |
| Net Guardian: Dai Kyō Utage | 1997 | Moguraya Soft | Moguraya Soft |
| NetHack | July 14, 1993 | | Shuwa System Trading Co. |
| Network Q RAC Rally | January 27, 1994 | Pixelkraft | Victor Entertainment |
| Night Gunner: Final Mission | 1992 | Studio K2 | Studio K2 |
| Nightmare Collection: Dead of the Brain - Shiryō no Sakebi | May 15, 1992 | FairyTale | FairyTale |
| Nightmare Collection: Dead of the Brain 2 | November 26, 1993 | FairyTale | FairyTale |
| Nightmare Collection II: Marine Philt | March 12, 1993 | FairyTale | FairyTale |
| Night Shifter | September 10, 1993 | Four-Nine | Four-Nine |
| Night Slave | March 8, 1996 | Melody | Melody |
| Ningyō Tsukai | May 29, 1992 | Forest | Forest |
| Ningyō Tsukai 2 | August 23, 1996 | Forest | Forest |
| Nobunaga no Yabō | November 1983 | Koei | Koei |
| Nobunaga no Yabō: Haō Den | December 4, 1992 | Koei | Koei |
| Nobunaga's Ambition | 1987 | Koei | Koei |
| Nobunaga's Ambition II | March 1989 | Koei | Koei |
| Nobunaga's Ambition: Lord of Darkness | March 15, 1991 | Koei | Koei |
| Nocturnal Illusion | April 21, 1995 | Apricot | Apricot |
| Noltia | May 14, 1993 | Flat | Flat |
| Nonomura Byōin no Hitobito | June 30, 1994 | Silky's | Silky's |
| Nooch: Abakareta Inbō | November 13, 1992 | Soft House Bon bee Bon Bon | Soft House Bon bee Bon Bon |
| Nooch II: Revenge of Remy | October 8, 1993 | Soft House Bon bee Bon Bon | Soft House Bon bee Bon Bon |
| Nooch III: Saigo no Seisen | December 16, 1994 | Soft House Bon bee Bon Bon | Soft House Bon bee Bon Bon |
| Nostalgia 1907 | December 20, 1991 | Sur de Wave | Sur de Wave |
| Nova | May 28, 1993 | Cat's Pro | Cat's Pro |
| Nurse Yū no Mumasensen | September 4, 1993 | Wendy Magazine | Wendy Magazine |
| Nut Berry | July 14, 1993 | DOTT Plan | DOTT Plan |
| Oerstedia | August 6, 1993 | Fuga System | Fuga System |
| Ogre | 1988 | ORIGIN Systems | SystemSoft |
| Oh! Kitsune-sama | May 31, 1996 | Curott | Curott |
| Oh! Pai | June 25, 1993 | Silky's | Silky's |
| The Old Village Story | December 23, 1988 | | Enix |
| OL Sōsamō | November 29, 1995 | Witch's | Witch's |
| Omega | April 24, 1992 | ORIGIN Systems | Tonkinhouse |
| Only You: Seikimatsu no Juliet-tachi | December 1995 | Alice Soft | Alice Soft |
| Onryō Senki | December 1, 1989 | Soft Studio Wing | Soft Studio Wing |
| Operation Europe: Path to Victory 1939-45 | April 4, 1992 | Koei | Koei |
| Oranda Tsuma wa Denki Unagi no Yume o Miru ka? | November 1984 | Koei | Koei |
| Oshioki Kirai! 2 | 1992 | Honwaka Soft | Honwaka Soft |
| Otome Senki | 1996 | Alice Soft | Alice Soft |
| Pac-Man | November 13, 1992 | Namco | WiZ |
| Pagan: Ultima VIII | November 22, 1995 | ORIGIN Systems | Electronic Arts |
| Panic Dolls | July 27, 1996 | Nihon Plantech | Nihon Plantech |
| Panorama Club | November 26, 1993 | Software House Parsley | Software House Parsley |
| Panzer General | November 10, 1995 | Strategic Simulations, Inc. | AMT Savan Corp. |
| Paparazzo | May 31, 1996 | U・Me Soft | U・Me Soft |
| Paradise Arena | June 24, 1994 | Janis | Janis |
| Paradise Heights | April 22, 1994 | Foster | Foster |
| Paradise Heights 2 | October 20, 1995 | Foster | Foster |
| Pasocomic Purple Cat | March 5, 1993 | Palm Tree Soft | Babylon |
| Patlabor: Operation Tokyo Bay | February 25, 1994 | | Banpresto |
| Pebble Beach Golf Links | 1992 | T&E Soft | T&E Soft |
| Peret em Heru: For the Prisoners | 1998 | Makoto Serise | |
| Perfect Soko-ban | November 20, 1989 | Thinking Rabbit | Thinking Rabbit |
| Pero-Pero Candy: Yō no Shō | August 2, 1996 | Mink Co. | Mink Co. |
| Persona: Ingyaku no Kamen | February 9, 1996 | Sorcière | Sorcière |
| Phantasie | August 1986 | | StarCraft, Inc. |
| Phantasie II | March 17, 1987 | | StarCraft, Inc. |
| Phantasie III: The Wrath of Nikademus | June 1988 | | StarCraft, Inc. |
| Phantasie IV: The Birth of Heroes | September 14, 1990 | | StarCraft, Inc. |
| Phobos | July 16, 1992 | Himeya Soft | Himeya Soft |
| Pia Carrot e Yōkoso!! | June 27, 1996 | Cocktail Soft | Cocktail Soft |
| Pias | August 10, 1990 | Birdy Soft | Birdy Soft |
| Pinball Construction Set | 1985 | | Comptiq |
| Pink Shock Pirates | November 1, 1989 | Soft Plan | Soft Plan |
| Pink Shock Pirates II | November 1, 1990 | Soft Plan | Soft Plan |
| Pink Sox | December 1, 1989 | Wendy Magazine | Wendy Magazine |
| Pinky Ponky | August 1989 | ELF Corporation | ELF Corporation |
| Pipe Dream | September 20, 1991 | The Assembly Line | Bullet-Proof Software |
| Pirate Adventure | September 1984 | | StarCraft, Inc. |
| Planetfall | February 28, 1992 | Infocom | SystemSoft |
| Planet's Edge: The Point of no Return | September 30, 1993 | New World Computing | Ving Co. |
| PlayMaker Football | November 27, 1992 | Broderbund | SystemSoft |
| Pocky | January 1989 | Ponytail Soft | Ponytail Soft |
| Pocky 2: Kaijin Aka Manto no Chōsen | August 31, 1991 | Ponytail Soft | Ponytail Soft |
| Poibos Part 1: Dasshutsu | 1984 | Zat Soft | Zat Soft |
| Polar Star | June 1984 | Hyo-Kin Soft | Carry Lab |
| Policenauts | July 29, 1994 | Konami | Konami |
| Police Quest 2: The Vengeance | October 1989 | Sierra On-Line | Sierra On-Line |
| Ponkan | February 11, 1994 | Ponytail Soft | Ponytail Soft |
| Pool of Radiance | December 21, 1989 | Strategic Simulations, Inc. | Pony Canyon |
| Pools of Darkness | March 19, 1993 | Strategic Simulations, Inc. | Pony Canyon |
| Popful Mail | 1992 | Nihon Falcom | Nihon Falcom |
| Populous | March 16, 1990 | Bullfrog Productions | Imagineer |
| Populous II: Trials of the Olympian Gods | February 5, 1993 | Bullfrog Productions | Imagineer |
| Possessioner | March 18, 1994 | Queen Soft | Queen Soft |
| Power Dolls | January 14, 1994 | Kogado Software Products | Kogado Software Products |
| Power Dolls 2 | December 2, 1994 | Kogado Studio | Kogado Studio |
| Powermonger | October 25, 1991 | Bullfrog Productions | Imagineer |
| Power Slave | October 27, 1995 | Umitsuki Production | Umitsuki Production |
| Pref Club | March 30, 1992 | IBS | Witty Wolf |
| Premium | September 17, 1992 | Silky's | Silky's |
| Premium 2 | January 28, 1993 | Silky's | Silky's |
| Prince of Persia | July 20, 1990 | Arsys Software | Riverhillsoft |
| Prince of Persia 2: The Shadow and the Flame | January 8, 1995 | Broderbund | Interprog |
| Princess Confusion | 1992 | Initialize | Initialize |
| Princess Maker | May 24, 1991 | Gainax Co. | Gainax Co. |
| Princess Maker 2 | June 15, 1993 | Gainax Co. | Gainax Co. |
| Princess Minerva | December 1992 | Riverhillsoft | Riverhillsoft |
| Princess Quest: Mahjong Sword | July 21, 1995 | Chime | Synchro-ni-City |
| Produce | July 1987 | dB-SOFT | dB-SOFT |
| Pro Student G | May 14, 1993 | Alice Soft | Alice Soft |
| Provvidenza: Legenda la Spada di Alfa | May 17, 1991 | Kinpukurin | Kinpukurin |
| Psychic Detective Series | November 26, 1993 | Data West | Data West |
| Psy-O-Blade | 1989 | T&E Soft | T&E Soft |
| P.T.O. | 1989 | Koei | Koei |
| P.T.O. II | 1993 | Koei | Koei |
| Pure | May 13, 1989 | Queen Soft | Queen Soft |
| Pure II | December 20, 1990 | Queen Soft | Queen Soft |
| Puyo Puyo | March 19, 1993 | Compile | Compile |
| Puyo Puyo 2 | October 27, 1995 | Compile | Compile |
| PuzzlePanic | 1985 | Fun and Games | SystemSoft |
| Puzznic | May 25, 1990 | Taito | Broderbund |
| Quarterstaff: The Tomb of Setmoth | August 10, 1990 | Simulated Environment Systems | StarCraft, Inc. |
| Quarth | September 21, 1990 | Konami | Konami |
| The Queen of Duellist | February 9, 1993 | Agumix | Agumix |
| The Queen of Duellist Gaiden | October 27, 1993 | Agumix | Agumix |
| The Queen of Duellist Gaiden α | January 29, 1994 | Agumix | Agumix |
| The Quest | August 1984 | | StarCraft, Inc. |
| Quintia Road | October 15, 1991 | Great Co. | Great Co. |
| Quintia Road II | April 15, 1993 | Communication Group Plum | Great Co. |
| Quiz Sangokushi: Chiryaku no Hasha | December 18, 1992 | Capcom | SystemSoft |
| Quiz Tonosama no Yabō | April 24, 1993 | Capcom | SystemSoft |
| Rabyni | June 21, 1996 | C's Ware | C's Ware |
| Railroad Empire | July 9, 1988 | Artdink Corporation | Artdink Corporation |
| Rall III: Kakusei-hen | October 17, 1994 | Fairy Dust | Fairy Dust |
| Rance 4.1: O-Kusuri Kōjō o Sukue! | December 1, 1995 | Alice Soft | Alice Soft |
| Rance 4.2: Angel-gumi | December 8, 1995 | Alice Soft | Alice Soft |
| Rance: Hikari o Motomete | July 15, 1989 | Alice Soft | Alice Soft |
| Rance II: Hangyaku no Shōjotachi | May 15, 1990 | Alice Soft | Alice Soft |
| Rance III: Leazas Kanraku | 1991 | Alice Soft | Alice Soft |
| Rance IV: Kyōdan no Isan | December 11, 1993 | Alice Soft | Alice Soft |
| Ranma 1/2: Hiryū Densetsu | December 20, 1991 | Quest Corporation | Bothtec, Inc. |
| Ravenloft: Strahd's Possession | June 23, 1995 | DreamForge Intertainment | Ving Co. |
| Ray Gun | 1990 | ELF Corporation | ELF Corporation |
| Reach for the Stars: The Conquest of the Galaxy | April 7, 1989 | Strategic Studies Group | Hobby Japan |
| Realms of Darkness | June 9, 1989 | Strategic Simulations, Inc. | StarCraft, Inc. |
| Record of Lodoss War: Haiiro no Majo | September 1988 | Humming Bird Soft | Humming Bird Soft |
| Record of Lodoss War II: Goshiki no Maryū | December 21, 1991 | Humming Bird Soft | Humming Bird Soft |
| Red Storm Rising | May 31, 1991 | MicroProse | MicroProse |
| Regional Power II | March 20, 1992 | Cosmos Computer | Cosmos Computer |
| Regional Power III | December 22, 1993 | Cosmos Computer | Cosmos Computer |
| Reijō Monogatari | April 28, 1995 | Inter Heart | Inter Heart |
| Reijū - Twin Road | January 19, 1996 | Apple Pie | Apple Pie |
| Reira: Slave Doll | April 28, 1994 | Silky's | Silky's |
| Relentless: Twinsen's Adventure | December 15, 1995 | Adeline Software International | Electronic Arts Victor |
| Relics | February 1986 | Bothtec, Inc. | Bothtec, Inc. |
| Reserve | 1990 | Takeru | M.I.N. |
| Reserve 1/2 | 1991 | Takeru | M.I.N. |
| Reserve 2 | 1992 | Takeru | M.I.N. |
| The Return of Ishtar | 1988 | Namco | SPS |
| Return to Zork | October 29, 1994 | Activision | Data West |
| Revery: Izanai no Masuishō | March 10, 1994 | Right Stuff Corp. | Right Stuff Corp. |
| Revival Xanadu | April 28, 1995 | Nihon Falcom | Nihon Falcom |
| Revival Xanadu 2: Remix | December 8, 1995 | Nihon Falcom | Nihon Falcom |
| Ribbon | April 28, 1995 | Soft House Bon bee Bon Bon | Soft House Bon bee Bon Bon |
| Riglas | 1986 | Random House | Random House |
| Ring Master I: The Shadow of Filias | November 25, 1988 | Hobby Japan | Hobby Japan |
| Ring Master II: Forget You Not, Evermore | April 7, 1989 | Hobby Japan | Hobby Japan |
| Ring Out!! | April 21, 1995 | ZyX Inc. | ZyX Inc. |
| Ring Quest | August 1985 | | StarCraft, Inc. |
| Rinkan Gakkō | December 20, 1994 | Foster | Foster |
| Rise of the Phoenix | 1993 | Koei | Koei |
| Roadwar 2000 | July 1988 | Strategic Simulations, Inc. | StarCraft, Inc. |
| Romance of the Three Kingdoms | April 1986 | Koei | Koei |
| Romance of the Three Kingdoms II | March 23, 1990 | Koei | Koei |
| Romance of the Three Kingdoms III: Dragon of Destiny | February 20, 1992 | Koei | Koei |
| Romance of the Three Kingdoms IV: Wall of Fire | February 13, 1994 | Koei | Koei |
| Romance wa Tsurugi no Kagayaki: Last Crusader | June 23, 1995 | FairyTale | FairyTale |
| Romancia: Dragon Slayer Jr. | October 6, 1986 | Nihon Falcom | Nihon Falcom |
| Rommel: Battles for North Africa | June 29, 1990 | Strategic Studies Group | Hobby Japan |
| Rose | October 18, 1991 | Ange | Ange |
| Rouge no Densetsu - Legend of Rouge | October 5, 1996 | D.O. Corp. | D.O. Corp. |
| Runaway City | December 22, 1995 | Tiare | Tiare |
| Run Run Kyōsōkyoku | August 1989 | ELF Corporation | ELF Corporation |
| Ruriiro no Yuki | March 7, 1997 | AIL | AIL |
| Russian Mahjong Harashō! | August 25, 1995 | Apple Pie | Apple Pie |
| Rusty | July 16, 1993 | C-lab. | C-lab. |
| Ryōki no Ori | August 25, 1995 | Studio Polaris | Nihon Plantech |
| Ryōki no Ori Dai-2 Shō | November 1996 | Studio Polaris | Nihon Plantech |
| Ryukyu | August 1989 | Login Soft | ASCII Corporation |
| Saint Diary: Kiyoka-chan no Nikki | November 29, 1996 | Desire | Desire |
| Sakusaku Daigōtō Returns | November 6, 1994 | Tanaka Brothers | A-Inn |
| Salad no Kuni no Tomato-hime | March 1984 | Hudson Soft | Hudson Soft |
| Sango Fighter | 1995 | Panda Entertainment Technology | Imagineer |
| Sangokushi V | December 15, 1995 | Koei | Koei |
| Santa-kun | July 19, 1991 | Active Software | Active Software |
| Saori: Bishōjo-tachi no Yakata | October 18, 1991 | FairyTale | FairyTale |
| Sargon V: World Class Chess | August 10, 1992 | Activision | G.A.M. Corporation |
| Satyr | September 2, 1994 | Aypio | Aypio |
| Sayonara no Mukō-gawa | April 4, 1997 | Foster | Foster |
| School Girls | April 14, 1995 | Scoop Software Productions | Scoop Software Productions |
| School Wars | August 1, 1990 | Cream Soft | Striker |
| Schwarzschild II: Teikoku no Haishin | June 30, 1989 | Kogado Studio | Kogado Studio |
| Schwarzschild III: Wakusei Dethperant | February 28, 1992 | Kogado Software Products | Kogado Software Products |
| Schwarzschild IV: The Cradle End | April 2, 1993 | Kogado Studio | Kogado Studio |
| The Screamer | 1986 | MagicalZoo | ASCII Corporation |
| Season of the Sakura | April 26, 1996 | Tiare | Tiare |
| Secret of the Silver Blades | July 17, 1992 | Strategic Simulations, Inc. | Pony Canyon |
| Seiken to Maken no Densetsu | 1992 | Login Soft | ASCII Corporation |
| Sei Senshi Mokkoriman | August 27, 1993 | Illusion | Illusion |
| Sei Shōjo Sentai Lakers | December 25, 1993 | Apple Pie | Apple Pie |
| Sei Shōjo Sentai Lakers II | December 16, 1994 | Apple Pie | Apple Pie |
| Sei Shōjo Sentai Lakers III | April 26, 1996 | Apple Pie | Apple Pie |
| Sex | February 24, 1995 | Aypio | Aypio |
| Sex 2 | March 1, 1996 | Aypio | Aypio |
| Sexpress | May 12, 1995 | Ange | Ange |
| ShadowCaster | August 26, 1994 | Raven Software Corporation | Electronic Arts Victor |
| Shanghai | 1987 | Activision | SystemSoft |
| Shanghai II | October 1989 | Sun Electronics | SystemSoft |
| Shanghai: Triple-Threat | September 14, 1995 | Activision | Electronic Arts Victor |
| Shangrlia | August 28, 1991 | ELF Corporation | ELF Corporation |
| Shangrlia 2 | September 30, 1993 | ELF Corporation | ELF Corporation |
| Sherwood Forest | June 1984 | | StarCraft, Inc. |
| Shi-Kin-Joh | March 1990 | Scap Trust | Scap Trust |
| Shiki Oni no Koku: Chūgokuhen | July 22, 1992 | Compile | Compile |
| Shinc | April 9, 1993 | Libido | Libido |
| Shin'ō Densetsu Crystania (Legend of Crystania) | July 7, 1997 | SystemSoft | SystemSoft |
| Shinwaden: Hatō no Shō | July 15, 1994 | Great Co. | Great Co. |
| Shiritsu Tantei Max: Sennyū!! Nazo no Joshikō | May 1988 | Agumix | Agumix |
| Shiritsu Tantei Max 2: Master of Elemental | August 2, 1991 | Agumix | Agumix |
| Shizuku | January 26, 1996 | Leaf | Leaf |
| Shogi (video game) | March 13, 1992 | ASCII Corporation | ASCII Company |
| Shogi II | November 20, 1992 | ASCII Corporation | ASCII Company |
| Shufflepuck Cafe | June 16, 1989 | Broderbund | Broderbund |
| Shuten Dōji | September 1990 | | Enix |
| Sid Meier's Civilization | September 25, 1992 | MPS Labs | MicroProse |
| Sid Meier's Pirates! | February 10, 1989 | MicroProse | MicroProse |
| Sid Meier's Railroad Tycoon | December 6, 1991 | MPS Labs | MicroProse |
| Silent Möbius: Case: Titanic | August 10, 1990 | Gainax Co. | Gainax Co. |
| Silent Service | July 1989 | MicroProse | MicroProse |
| SimAnt: The Electronic Ant Colony | February 19, 1993 | Maxis | Imagineer |
| SimCity | 1990 | Maxis | Foretune Co. |
| SimCity 2000 | June 1994 | Maxis | Imagineer |
| SimEarth: The Living Planet | September 6, 1991 | Maxis | Imagineer |
| SimFarm | May 27, 1994 | Maxis | Imagineer |
| Skapon Taikentai: The Enchanted Hunters | 1988 | PSK | PSK |
| Slayers | March 25, 1994 | AIC Spirits | Banpresto |
| Soft de Hard na Monogatari | December 1988 | System Sacom | System Sacom |
| Soft de Hard na Monogatari 2 | June 1989 | System Sacom | System Sacom |
| Soko-ban Revenge | December 22, 1991 | Thinking Rabbit | Thinking Rabbit |
| Soko-ban Select 30 | 1991 | Thinking Rabbit | Kao Corporation |
| Solitaire Royale | June 24, 1988 | Software Resources International | Game Arts |
| Sorcerian | March 25, 1988 | Nihon Falcom | Nihon Falcom |
| Sorcer Kingdom | October 27, 1995 | Aypio | Aypio |
| Soreyuke Nanpa-kun | October 4, 1991 | Virgin House | Virgin House |
| Sotsugyō | 1992 | Headroom | Japan Home Video |
| Sotsugyō II: Neo Generation | May 27, 1994 | Headroom | Japan Home Video |
| Sotsugyō Shashin / Miki | March 12, 1992 | Cocktail Soft | Cocktail Soft |
| Space Hulk | March 3, 1995 | | StarCraft, Inc. |
| Space Invaders | January 31, 1992 | Taito | WiZ |
| Space Quest IV: Roger Wilco and the Time Rippers | February 21, 1992 | Sierra On-Line | Sierra On-Line |
| Space Rogue | September 24, 1990 | ORIGIN Systems | Wave Train |
| Spindizzy Worlds | 1991 | Arsys Software | Arsys Software |
| Star Command | April 20, 1989 | Strategic Simulations, Inc. | HULINKS Inc. |
| Star Cruiser | 1988 | Arsys Software | Arsys Software |
| Star Cruiser II: The Odysseus Project | June 18, 1993 | Arsys Software | Arsys Software |
| Starfire | October 14, 1994 | StarCraft, Inc. | StarCraft, Inc. |
| Starglider II | September 28, 1991 | Argonaut Software | MicroProse |
| Star Platinum | October 10, 1996 | Custom | Custom |
| Starship Rendezvous | May 1988 | ARKLIGHT | Scap Trust |
| Star Trap | January 26, 1996 | Fairy Dust | Fairy Dust |
| Star Wars: Attack on the Death Star | December 4, 1992 | M.N.M Software | Victor Musical Industries |
| Steam-Heart's | 1994 | GIGA | Technical Group Laboratory |
| The Story of King Aress | March 18, 1994 | Gust Co. | Gust Co. |
| The Story of Melroon | December 1989 | dB-SOFT | dB-SOFT |
| Strange Odyssey | December 1984 | | StarCraft, Inc. |
| Stratego | May 19, 1992 | | Victor Musical Industries |
| Strike Commander | August 26, 1994 | ORIGIN Systems | Electronic Arts Victor |
| Stronghold | June 2, 1994 | Stormfront Studios | Ving Co. |
| Stunts | March 5, 1993 | Distinctive Software | Electronic Arts Victor |
| The Summoning | November 10, 1994 | Event Horizon Software | Ving Co. |
| Super Battle Skin Panic | February 8, 1991 | Gainax Co. | Gainax Co. |
| Super Daisenryaku | 1988 | SystemSoft | SystemSoft |
| Super D.P.S | November 14, 1992 | Alice Soft | Alice Soft |
| Super Erecto Taisen: S・EX | January 12, 1995 | Dynamic Production | Dynamic Production |
| Super Real Mahjong: PII & PIII | 1993 | SETA Corporation | Ving Co. |
| Super Real Mahjong PIV | May 27, 1994 | SETA Corporation | Ving Co. |
| Super Tetris 2 + Bombliss | October 15, 1994 | Bullet-Proof Software | Bullet-Proof Software |
| Super Ultra Machine Cyborg Marilyn DX | May 25, 1994 | JAST Co. | JAST Co. |
| Suzaku | March 27, 1992 | Wolf Team | Wolf Team |
| Swap | April 8, 1993 | Microïds | Ecseco Development |
| Sweet Angel | 1992 | Active Software | Active Software |
| Sword Dancer | March 25, 1992 | Technical Group Laboratory | Technical Group Laboratory |
| Sword Dancer: Goddess of the Evil Blade | May 26, 1994 | Technical Group Laboratory | Technical Group Laboratory |
| Sword World PC | November 27, 1992 | T&E Soft | T&E Soft |
| Syndicate | July 28, 1994 | Bullfrog Productions | Electronic Arts Victor |
| System Shock | May 24, 1996 | Looking Glass Technologies | Electronic Arts Victor |
| Taikō Risshiden | March 13, 1992 | Koei | Koei |
| Taikō Risshiden II | March 1995 | Koei | Koei |
| Taikyoku Igo: Goliath | June 3, 1991 | Bullet-Proof Software | Bullet-Proof Software |
| Taiyō no Shinden | November 20, 1986 | Nihon Falcom | Nihon Falcom |
| Takamizawa Kyōsuke Nekketsu!! Kyōiku Kenshū | December 22, 1994 | ZyX Inc. | ZyX Inc. |
| Tales of the Unknown: Volume I - The Bard's Tale | 1988 | Interplay Productions | Electronic Arts |
| Tanjō: Debut | June 25, 1993 | Headroom | NEC Avenue |
| T.D.F. Kaijū daisensō kesshi no genshiro bōei sakusen | 1988 | Data West | Data West |
| Telengard | January 1984 | Microcomputer Games, Orion Software | Kiya Overseas Industry |
| Tenchi Muyō!: Ryō-ōki | November 11, 1994 | AIC Spirits | Banpresto |
| Tenka Tōitsu | July 1989 | SystemSoft | SystemSoft |
| Tenshin Ranma | March 18, 1992 | ELF Corporation | ELF Corporation |
| Tenshitachi no Gogo II: Bangai-hen | April 1988 | JAST Co. | JAST Co. |
| Tenshitachi no Gogo II: Minako | August 1987 | JAST Co. | JAST Co. |
| Tenshitachi no Gogo III: Bangai-hen | December 1990 | JAST Co. | JAST Co. |
| Tenshitachi no Gogo III: Ribbon | November 1989 | JAST Co. | JAST Co. |
| Tenshitachi no Gogo IV | July 10, 1991 | JAST Co. | JAST Co. |
| Tenshitachi no Gogo: Tenkōsei | June 16, 1995 | JAST Co. | JAST Co. |
| Tenshitachi no Gogo VI: My Fair Teacher | July 20, 1993 | JAST Co. | JAST Co. |
| Tesserae | March 27, 1992 | | ASCII Corporation |
| Test Drive | March 21, 1989 | Distinctive Software | Pony Canyon |
| Tetris | November 18, 1988 | Bullet-Proof Software | Bullet-Proof Software |
| TFX | June 28, 1996 | Digital Image Design | Imagineer |
| Theme Park | August 25, 1995 | Bullfrog Productions | Electronic Arts Victor |
| Themm: Haruka Naru Meikyū | February 24, 1995 | Hervest | Hervest |
| Thexder | April 1986 | Game Arts | Game Arts |
| Three of a Perfect Pair | 1992 | Bolze | Bolze |
| Three Sisters' Story | February 29, 1996 | JAST Co. | JAST Co. |
| Thunder Force | October 1984 | Tecno Soft | Tecno Soft |
| Time Stripper | January 26, 1996 | Foster | Foster |
| Time Zone | February 1985 | Sierra On-Line | StarCraft, Inc. |
| Tir-nan-óg: Descendants of Danaan | December 1987 | SystemSoft | SystemSoft |
| Tir-nan-óg II: The Sign of Chaos | April 20, 1989 | SystemSoft | SystemSoft |
| Tōdō Ryūnosuke Tantei Nikki: Kohakuiro no Yuigon | July 1988 | Riverhill Soft | Riverhill Soft |
| Tōdō Ryūnosuke Tantei Nikki: Ōgon no Rashinban | October 5, 1990 | Riverhill Soft | Riverhill Soft |
| Tōgenkyō: Harlem Fantasy | 1993 | Swat | Swat |
| Touhou Fūmaroku ~ The Story of Eastern Wonderland | August 15, 1997 | ZUN Soft | Amusement Makers |
| Touhou Gensokyo ~ Lotus Land Story | August 14, 1998 | ZUN Soft | Amusement Makers |
| Touhou Kaikidan ~ Mystic Square | December 30, 1998 | ZUN Soft | Amusement Makers |
| Touhou Reiiden ~ The Highly Responsive to Prayers | November 1996 | ZUN Soft | Amusement Makers |
| Touhou Yumejikū ~ The Phantasmagoria of Dim. Dream | December 29, 1997 | ZUN Soft | Amusement Makers |
| Topple Zip | 1987 | MiCROViSion | Bothtec |
| Tōshin Toshi | 1990 | Alice Soft | Alice Soft |
| Tōshin Toshi II | December 9, 1994 | Alice Soft | Alice Soft |
| Totsugeki! Mix | June 17, 1994 | C-lab. | C-lab. |
| Transylvania | January 1984 | Penguin Software | StarCraft, Inc. |
| Trigger | June 17, 1994 | ZyX Inc. | ZyX Inc. |
| Trigger 2 | August 25, 1995 | ZyX Inc. | ZyX Inc. |
| Tritorn | 1986 | Sein-Soft | Sein-Soft |
| Tritorn II: Road of Darkness | January 1989 | Xain | Xain |
| True Golf Classics: Waialae Country Club | 1991 | T&E Soft | T&E Soft |
| True Golf Classics: Wicked 18 | November 20, 1992 | T&E Soft | T&E Soft |
| True Heart | December 16, 1994 | Cocktail Soft | Cocktail Soft |
| True Love | June 9, 1995 | Software House Parsley | Software House Parsley |
| Tuned Heart | February 23, 1996 | SystemSoft | SystemSoft |
| Tunnels & Trolls: Crusaders of Khazan | March 9, 1990 | StarCraft, Inc. | StarCraft, Inc. |
| Twilight | 1994 | Studio Twinkle | Studio Twinkle |
| Twilight Zone | February 1987 | Great Co | Great Co |
| Twilight Zone II: Nagisa no Yakata | October 21, 1988 | Great Co | Great Co |
| Twilight Zone Vol. 4: Tokubetsu-hen | April 1990 | Great Co | Great Co |
| Twin Peaches | August 12, 1993 | Pinky Soft | Pinky Soft |
| Uchū Kaitō Funny Bee | August 10, 1994 | Alice Soft | Alice Soft |
| Uchū no Kishi Tekkaman Blade: Orbital Ring Dakkai Sakusen | August 26, 1994 | Matrix | Matrix |
| Ultima I: The First Age of Darkness | December 21, 1988 | ORIGIN Systems | Pony Canyon |
| Ultima II: The Revenge of the Enchantress | 1985 | ORIGIN Systems | StarCraft, Inc. |
| Ultima III: Exodus | November 25, 1985 | ORIGIN Systems | StarCraft, Inc. |
| Ultima IV: Quest of the Avatar | July 18, 1987 | ORIGIN Systems | Pony Canyon |
| Ultima Underworld: The Stygian Abyss | December 17, 1993 | Blue Sky Productions | Electronic Arts Victor |
| Ultima Underworld II: Labyrinth of Worlds | March 17, 1995 | Looking Glass Technologies | Electronic Arts Victor |
| Ultima V: Warriors of Destiny | July 21, 1990 | ORIGIN Systems | Pony Canyon |
| Ultima VI: The False Prophet | November 21, 1991 | ORIGIN Systems | Pony Canyon |
| Uncharted Waters | July 26, 1990 | Koei | Koei |
| Uncharted Waters: New Horizons | February 1993 | Koei | Koei |
| Ura Mansion Hakkin | May 24, 1996 | Illusion | Illusion |
| Urotsukidōji | 1990 | FairyTale | FairyTale |
| Usagi na Panic | February 24, 1995 | Nihon Softec | Nihon Softec |
| U.S. Navy Fighters: Gold | April 26, 1996 | Electronic Arts | Electronic Arts Victor |
| Vain Dream | September 21, 1991 | Glodia | Glodia |
| Vain Dream II | November 11, 1992 | Glodia | Glodia |
| Valentine Kiss | February 9, 1996 | Silky's | Silky's |
| Valis: The Fantasm Soldier | 1986 | Telenet Japan | Wolf Team |
| Valkyrie: The Power Beauties | February 24, 1995 | Discovery | Discovery |
| Vastness: Kūkyo no Ikenietachi | June 11, 1993 | Mediax | Mediax |
| Veil of Darkness | August 4, 1994 | Event Horizon Software | Ving Co. |
| Venus | June 29, 1994 | Software House Parsley | Software House Parsley |
| Vette! | September 18, 1993 | Sphere, Inc. | Twilight Express |
| V.G.: Variable Geo | July 9, 1993 | GIGA | GIGA |
| V.G. II: The Bout of Cabalistic Goddess | November 25, 1994 | GIGA | GIGA |
| Viper BTR | July 5, 1996 | Sogna | Sogna |
| Viper CTR: Asuka | January 24, 1997 | Sogna | Sogna |
| Viper GTS | November 25, 1994 | Sogna | Sogna |
| Viper V-10 | March 11, 1994 | Sogna | Sogna |
| Viper V-12 | April 21, 1995 | Sogna | Sogna |
| Viper V-16 | December 22, 1995 | Sogna | Sogna |
| Viper V6 | June 25, 1993 | Sogna | Sogna |
| Viper V-8 | September 10, 1993 | Sogna | Sogna |
| Virgin Angel | 1995 | Crystal Soft | Crystal Soft |
| Vision | 1991 | M.I.N | M.I.N |
| Vision 2 | November 10, 1991 | M.I.N | M.I.N |
| V.R. Date: May Club | August 25, 1995 | Desire | Desire |
| Wakusei Omega no Q Ōji | September 12, 1996 | Studio Twinkle | Studio Twinkle |
| WarCraft: Orcs & Humans | December 2, 1995 | Blizzard Entertainment | Electronic Arts Victor |
| War Game Construction | 1992 | SystemSoft | SystemSoft |
| War in the South Pacific | 1989 | | Hobby Japan |
| Wedding Peach | March 15, 1996 | Tao Human Systems | KSS |
| Welltris | March 27, 1992 | Doka | Bullet-Proof Software |
| Wibarm | August 1986 | Arsys Software | Arsys Software |
| Will: The Death Trap II | June 1985 | Square Co. | Square Co. |
| Wind's Seed | 1995 | Compile | Compile |
| Wing Commander: Armada | July 28, 1995 | ORIGIN Systems | Electronic Arts Victor |
| Wing-Man | March 1985 | TamTam Co. | Enix |
| Wing-Man 2: Keytackler no Fukkatsu | April 1986 | TamTam Co. | Enix |
| Wing-Man Special: Saraba Yumesenshi | December 1987 | TamTam Co. | Enix |
| Wings of Fury (Note: Wings of Fury was titled just Wings on PC-98 and Sharp X68000.) | September 1989 | Broderbund | Broderbund |
| Winning Post | January 14, 1993 | Koei | Koei |
| Winning Post 2 Plus | March 29, 1996 | Koei | Koei |
| Wizardry: Bane of the Cosmic Forge | December 23, 1991 | Sir-Tech | ASCII Corporation |
| Wizardry: Knight of Diamonds - The Second Scenario | December 19, 1986 | Sir-Tech | ASCII Corporation |
| Wizardry: Legacy of Llylgamyn - The Third Scenario | June 27, 1987 | Sir-Tech | ASCII Corporation |
| Wizardry: Proving Grounds of the Mad Overlord | November 15, 1985 | Sir-Tech | ASCII Corporation |
| Wizardry: The Return of Werdna - The Fourth Scenario | December 15, 1988 | Sir-Tech | ASCII Corporation |
| Wizardry V: Heart of the Maelstrom | June 8, 1990 | Sir-Tech | ASCII Corporation |
| Wizardry VII: Crusaders of the Dark Savant | September 23, 1994 | Sir-Tech | ASCII Corporation |
| Wolfenstein 3D | 1994 | id Software | Imagineer |
| Wolfish Gallop: Legacy of the Solomon | July 29, 1994 | Pandora Box | Pandora Box |
| Wolf Pack | April 3, 1992 | NovaLogic | BNN |
| Wonpara Wars | March 31, 1993 | Mink Co. | Mink Co. |
| Wonpara Wars II | March 10, 1995 | Mink Co. | Mink Co. |
| Woody Poco | December 1986 | dB-SOFT | dB-SOFT |
| Words Worth | July 22, 1993 | ELF Corporation | ELF Corporation |
| Worlds of Ultima: The Savage Empire | December 2, 1992 | ORIGIN Systems | Pony Canyon |
| World Tour Golf | 1988 | | Electronic Arts |
| Wrestle Angels | February 28, 1992 | Communication Group Plum | Great Co. |
| Wrestle Angels 2: Top Eventer | December 24, 1992 | Communication Group Plum | Great Co. |
| Wrestle Angels 3 | October 15, 1993 | Communication Group Plum | Great Co. |
| Wrestle Angels Special: Mō Hitori no Top Eventer | February 10, 1994 | Communication Group Plum | Great Co. |
| Wrestle Angels V1 | August 25, 1995 | KSS | KSS |
| Wrestle Angels V2 | December 22, 1995 | KSS | KSS |
| Wrestle Angels V3 | May 24, 1996 | KSS | KSS |
| Xak II: Rising of the Redmoon | November 2, 1990 | Microcabin | Microcabin |
| Xak III: The Eternal Recurrence | April 23, 1993 | Microcabin | Microcabin |
| Xak Precious Package: The Tower of Gazzel | 1991 | Microcabin | Microcabin |
| Xak: The Art of Visual Stage | June 1989 | Microcabin | Microcabin |
| Xanadu: Dragon Slayer II | February 1986 | Nihon Falcom | Nihon Falcom |
| Xenon: Mugen no Shitai | December 9, 1994 | C's Ware | C's Ware |
| Xenon 2 Megablast | November 22, 1991 | The Assembly Line, Bitmap Brothers | Epic/Sony |
| Xevious | 1985 | Namco | Enix |
| X-Girl | April 19, 1996 | Red-Zone | FairyTale |
| X・na | 1991 | FairyTale | FairyTale |
| XZR | August 1988 | Renovation Game | Telenet Japan |
| Yakusoku - Promise | July 25, 1997 | May-Be Soft | May-Be Soft |
| Yesterday | September 1990 | ZigZag | New System House Oh! |
| Yōjū Club Custom | November 15, 1991 | D.O. Corp. | D.O. Corp. |
| Yōjū Senki: A.D. 2048 | September 17, 1993 | D.O. Corp. | D.O. Corp. |
| Ys I: Ancient Ys Vanished | August 28, 1987 | Nihon Falcom | Nihon Falcom |
| Ys II: Ancient Ys Vanished – The Final Chapter | June 24, 1988 | Nihon Falcom | Nihon Falcom |
| Ys III: Wanderers from Ys | July 28, 1989 | Nihon Falcom | Nihon Falcom |
| YU-NO: A Girl Who Chants Love at the Bound of this World | December 26, 1996 | ELF Corporation | ELF Corporation |
| Yūrō: Transient Sand | August 2, 1996 | Hervest | Hervest |
| Zai Metajo | December 20, 1996 | R-Force Software | Anjin |
| Zan III: Ten'un Ware ni Ari | December 18, 1993 | Wolf Team | Telenet Japan |
| Zan: Kagerō no Toki | September 20, 1991 | Wolf Team | Telenet Japan |
| Zan: Yasha Enbukyoku | March 1, 1991 | Wolf Team | Telenet Japan |
| Zarth | 1985 | Enix | Enix |
| Zatsuon Ryōiki | December 16, 1994 | D.O. Corp. | D.O. Corp. |
| Zavas | December 1988 | Glodia | Popcom Soft |
| Zavas II: The Prophecy of Mehitae | February 24, 1993 | Glodia | Popcom Soft |
| Zenith | November 11, 1994 | Himeya Soft | Himeya Soft |
| Zen Nihon Bishōjo Mahjong Senshūken Taikai: Heart de Ron!! | November 15, 1994 | D.O. Corp. | D.O. Corp. |
| Zerø: The 4th Unit Act.4 | December 20, 1989 | Data West | Data West |
| Zettai Mahjong | 1994 | Hell++ | Hell++ |
| Zettai Mahjong II' EG | 1996 | Hell++ | Hell++ |
| Zork: The Great Underground Empire | May 29, 1991 | Infocom | SystemSoft |
