= Shūjin e no Pert-em-Hru =

1998 role-playing video game

- Developer: Makoto Yaotani
- Publisher: Independent
- Designer: Makoto Yaotani
- Composer: Kei Mizuho
- Engine: RPG Maker Dante 98 II
- Platform: NEC PC-9801
- Release: 1998
- Genres: Role-playing video game Survival horror
- Mode: Single player

Shūjin e no Pert-em-Hru (囚人へのペル・エム・フル, Shūjin e no Peru Emu Furu), unofficially localised as Peret em Heru: For the Prisoners, is a Japanese freeware role-playing video game created with RPG Maker Dante 98 II, by Makoto Yaotani (八百谷 真), then under the alias "Makoto Serise" (芹瀬 眞人). "Pert-em-Hru" refers to the Egyptian Book of the Dead, so the title of the game means "The Book of the Dead for the Prisoners". The game was produced by two people, with Yaotani responsible for most of the development, and production took a year and a half to complete.

The game received many honours, including the Platinum Prize in the ASCII-held monthly contest "Internet Contest Park" — the only Platinum Prize to be given out during the existence of the contest. The game has since developed a cult following. An unofficial English translation was released in 2014.

A remake utilizing RPG Maker VX has been under development since 2012.

== Gameplay ==
Gameplay is similar to other RPGs in that it involves exploration and random enemy encounters, but its focus is not on combat but rather puzzle-solving to save party members from death. The main character, throughout the course of the game, can learn action commands such as "push", "crawl", "look above", etc., and these actions are crucial to save his comrades. If the main character fails to save a party member, not only does that person die and leave the party forever, he or she will come back to life in a mummified form to attack the party during the latter stages of the game. Different combinations of survivors result in different dialogue in the epilogue.

== Plot ==
Professor Tsuchida, a leading expert on archaeology, goes on an unauthorized expedition into the unknown lower levels of the Great Pyramid of Giza with his assistant Kōji Kuroe. They soon realize that the underground ruins is full of death traps when the excavator they hired is decapitated by a thin metal wire. Professor Tsuchida, unwilling to back down, goes outside the pyramid to lure a Japanese tour group nearby to act as his human shield. Inside the pyramid, one by one, the members of the entourage become subject to Khufu's punishment for their faults, but the professor insists on heading deeper into the complex despite knowing the fatal dangers of the environment.

== Characters ==
- Ayuto Asaki (朝木 歩人)

The protagonist of the game, picked by Professor Tsuchida to be the front runner of the group because he was wearing a cap ("That makes him safer," said the professor). An all-around good person who thinks objectively and often ponders the concepts of reality, life, and death.
When the group crosses the underground river (a metaphorical River Styx), he kicks a mummy off the sinking boat to lighten the boat's weight. He then becomes the first person to be punished in the game when the same mummy pulls him into the water. Ayuto overcomes the mummy and is rescued by his friends.

- Rin Tsukihara (月原 倫)

A nine-year-old elementary school student who somehow tagged along with the group. Under her cheerful appearance hides a fragile heart seeking attention — and she does so by telling lies and playing pranks.
If the player does not believe her when she says there is a crack in the ground, she gets crushed to death by a moving statue as punishment for lying.

- Mitsuru Kōeiji (光栄寺 満)

An obese college student who is unmotivated to do anything and often complains about being hungry, sleepy, or homesick.
Dies in the gas chamber if the player, like the rest of the group, forgets about him after crossing the gas chamber.

- Sae Otogi (音樹 冴)

The tour guide who often voices concern over the safety of the group. In reality, she is a drug trafficker who works for a criminal organization. Her secret identity was discovered by Mizumi the photojournalist in the gas chamber, and he uses this finding to blackmail her.
Gets crushed to death by the fallen ceiling as punishment for her crimes if the player does not set a log in place beforehand.

- Sōji Mizumi (水見 壮司)

A photojournalist who blackmails women for sexual favors. While crossing the gas chamber with Otogi, he sees white powder drop from Otogi and realizes Otogi's real occupation.
On the descent toward the bottom of the pyramid, he takes a picture of a statue, which he thought was a woman. Later, he gets hanged by a mummified woman in the exact place where he took the picture and dies if the player fails to notice him.

- Saori Shinoda (篠田 早織)

A defensive high school student who repels all attempts to approach her. Despite her cold demeanour, she is very pessimistic and has a tendency to harm herself. According to Otogi the tour guide, Saori and her boyfriend both registered for the trip to Egypt, but only Saori came.
When the group heads down the stairs toward the bottom of the pyramid, she stays behind to look at a photo of her boyfriend. She is only one aside from Kyōsuke that her fate does not involved Khufu's punishment, rather it involves committing suicide. Thus it is recommended for players to take the picture away from her at all times and never give the photo back at any point until the end to ensure her survival, otherwise she will later leap from a 10-storey height to her death, regardless of whether or not she revives as a mummified enemy after Khufu's death.

- Yōko Nogisaka (乃木坂 葉子)

A classmate of Nei, Kyōsuke, and Ayuto, she is the subject of Kyōsuke's affection, though she secretly likes Ayuto instead. Although she has a kind and timid personality, she once stole a pendant from a local department store.
She is attacked by Anubis in the form of a jackal for her thievery, and if the player does not take the pendant away from her, she is killed.
She also appears in the RPG Maker XP sample game Shishimura, created by the same author.

- Nei Ichikawa (市川 寧)

The heroine of the game, Nei has a straightforward personality. She is a childhood friend of Ayuto and secretly likes him, and so runs away in a fit of jealousy when a frightened Yōko clings to Ayuto. When Ayuto reaches her, she is about to confess her love to him when a coffin clamped her shut and jetted into the tomb of Khufu's wives.
If the player opens the coffin of one of Khufu's five wives instead of Nei's, the tomb collapses and Nei falls to her death.

- Kōji Kuroe (黒江 浩二)

The assistant to Professor Tsuchida and a doctor himself. Although a bit greedy, he cares about the wellbeing of the people around him, and is the healer of the group. When he was a medical student in 1997, he, Professor Tsuchida, and Tsuchida's daughter were caught in the November 1997 Luxor massacre. He refused to treat Tsuchida's dying daughter because he was not a licensed doctor yet, and so Tsuchida kept a hidden grudge on Kuroe for letting his daughter die before their eyes.
Kuroe was fatally shot in the heart by Tsuchida in front of Khufu's mummy, for what Tsuchida calls "a punishment for murder". There is no way to save him.

- Professor Tsuchida (土田 教授)

A shrewd and cunning professor for archaeology who stops at nothing to pursue his goals, at the expense of the people around him. Recognized as an expert in the archaeology of Egypt, he obviously knows a lot about the tomb he is in, and thus assumes the role of group leader in place of Otogi.
After reaching their destination, the mummy of Khufu, he kills Kuroe with a pistol for letting his daughter die. Tsuchida is then crushed to death by the pillars around the mummy as a punishment for actual murder. The creator of the game had plans to make it possible to avert the deaths of Kuroe and Tsuchida by allowing the player to take away Tsuchida's pistol, but the plan was scrapped due to time constraints.

- Kyōsuke Hino (日野 今日介)

A simple-minded boy who acts before he thinks. He is among the four high school friends who came to Egypt together and harbours special feelings for Yōko. He is the only person in the entourage that Khufu finds faultless, and receives the powers of Khufu via electrocution. Since then, his imaginations unwittingly become reality to haunt whatever's left of the tour group during their escape.

== Development ==
Makoto Yaotani cited Corpse Party as a direct motivation to make Shūjin e no Pert-em-Hru, since it exceeded the boundaries of "what commercial games could not do" at the time, especially the depictions of splatter gore. Yaotani also drew inspiration from Indiana Jones, Sherlock Holmes, Father Brown, and the works of Junji Ito for the adventure, mystery-solving, and horror elements of the game.

Yaotani considers working around the limitations of game creation as an enjoyment, which was why he thought creating games in RPG Maker would be interesting. Since RPG Maker Dante 98 II only supports 16-bit colours, Shūjin e no Pert-em-Hru was set inside a dark pyramid so the colour palette could be narrowed. The skills menu of Dante 98 II, originally designed for in-battle commands like in typical RPGs, was adapted to contain the "action commands" from which the player can choose to use as the story progresses.

== Reception ==
In August 1998, the game was given the Platinum Award for the "Internet Contest Park" monthly contest held by ASCII. The prize was ¥150,000, and Shūjin e no Pert-em-Hru became the only game to receive the Platinum Award for that contest — which ran monthly from July 1998 to June 2002. The award's judges praised the game for its original gameplay, its detailed graphics, its suspenseful plot and its intricate characterization. The game also ranked fourth in the annual popularity poll in 1998, and ninth on the popularity poll for all years, both for "Internet Contest Park".

Shūjin e no Pert-em-Hru also won the Third Ascii Entertainment Software Contest in the "Ascii Maker Product" category, giving its creator ¥1,000,000 as prize. The game was then covered in magazines like Tech Win and Nikkei Click.

Remaining largely unknown in the west, in 2014, fan translation group Memories of Fear released an English translation of the game. Hardcore Gaming 101's Luca Pane praised the game's atmosphere, characterization, gameplay and spritework. Destructoid's Andrea Gonzalez said the game "holds up well for its age" and called it a "gem emerged from the sands that buried it". Game Rant's Ritwik Mitra also stated it was "one of the most underrated and chilling horror games that more players should check out".
