= Mirage (video game) =

1995 video game

- Developer: The Dream Designers
- Publisher: Atlantis Interactive
- Designer: Christopher and Philip Booth
- Platforms: Windows 3.1, MS-DOS, Macintosh
- Release: 1995
- Genre: Point-and-click adventure
- Mode: Single-player

Mirage is a point-and-click adventure developed by The Dream Designers for Windows 3.1, MS-DOS, and Macintosh. It was published in 1995 by Atlantis Interactive, an offshoot of the adult film company Vivid Entertainment. The game's plot and much of its live-action footage are taken from the 1994 Vivid film Shame minus the more explicit content. A 3DO version was planned but never released.

== Gameplay ==
Mirage takes place in a fictional desert of the same name during the American Frontier. The player's takes on the role of Leutinant Shooter, on a mission to rescue his wife Jenny who has been kidnapped by bandits. Set primarily in said desert, the game shifts between seemingly disconnected locales in a surreal manner. Similar to the game Myst, Mirage is a point-and-click adventure with a first-person perspective that has the player interact with various parts of pre-rendered scenes to solve puzzles and progress.

== Development and release ==
Mirage was one of the first games from publisher Atlantis Interactive. Adult film company Vivid Entertainment, which produced digitized pornography and games under its Vivid Interactive label, established Atlantis as another subsidiary to produce more mainstream games. Mirage is an adaptation of the 1994 Vivid film Shame, using its storyline and some of its footage but excluding its sex scenes and nudity. The game had a budget of approximately $500,000 USD and was developed by The Dream Designers (helmed by brothers Christopher and Philip Booth), which first worked with Vivid on the erotic title Love Bites for the 3DO. Atlantis characterized Mirage as being "like a Myst or The 7th Guest with a Western cyberpunk format." The Dream Designers produced the game with abstractions in the vein of H. P. Lovecraft and Monty Python without linear constraints, deliberately lacking continuity.

Mirage was released for Windows 3.1, MS-DOS, and Macintosh in 1995. The game initially shipped with a potentially fatal software bug that apparently had a patch offered to consumers by the manufacturer. A 3DO version was planned but never released. Atlantis Interactive was later renamed Atlantean Interactive and produced a limited number of additional games during the mid-1990s. The Dream Designers collaborated with the publisher on at least one other unreleased project titled Skin: The Virtual Tattoo.

== Reception ==
Reception

Review scores
Publication	Score
Hyper	55/100
Next Generation	1/5
Electronic Entertainment	3.1/5
K	880/1000
Power Unlimited	65/100
Tekno	60%

Next Generation reviewed the PC version of the game, rating it one star out of five, and stated that "Like areas that will randomly kill you? Like spending minutes searching for hot-spots with a mouse? No? Well then, stay away from this." Wired described the game as a Myst rip-off and possibly the worst CD-ROM ever made. The magazine summarized, "Entering the world of Mirage is like participating in a dadaist exercise in meaninglessness staged by people with a sixth-grade education." Femme Fatales reported in its April 1996 issue that Mirage had sold nearly 75,000 copies.
