= Phantasie II =

1986 video game

- Commodore 64 cover art
- Developer: Winston Douglas Wood
- Publisher: Strategic Simulations
- Series: Phantasie
- Platforms: Apple II, Commodore 64, Atari 8-bit, Atari ST, PC-88, PC-98, FM-7, Sharp X1, MSX
- Release: 1986
- Genre: Role-playing
- Mode: Single-player

Phantasie II is the second game in the Phantasie series of role-playing video games.

== Gameplay ==
Atari ST screenshot

In 1986, SSI published the next part of the Phantasie series, Phantasie II. Again, the Dark Lord Nikademus was the nemesis. This time Nikademus had fashioned an evil orb, and with it he cast a curse on a beautiful island named Ferronrah and enslaved its people. The player's mission was to find and destroy the orb.

Phantasie II used the same graphics and fighting as the original Phantasie game, with one improvement to combat: the ability of any character class to target any enemy rank with a thrown rock. There were improvements in the complexity of quests, but little was done to innovate the series. One option which endeared many veterans was the ability to transfer characters from Phantasie I to this sequel.

The manual included in Phantasie II was identical to the one included with Phantasie, plus a small card explaining the differences. Computer Gaming World noted this was advantageous in terms of how players of the original would have an easier time getting into the game, but disadvantageous as to some particularly tedious mechanisms of both games, particularly "the infamous Distribution and Selling rigamarole". The review continued to note that characters imported from the original have their equipment removed as well as most of their gold and experience, affording only a slight head start over newly created characters.

== Reception ==
Phantasie II sold 30,100 copies. Compute! in 1986 recommended it to those seeking a more traditional role–playing game than SSI's Rings of Zilfin or who enjoyed Phantasie. Scorpia criticized Phantasie II for not changing its predecessor's "infamous Distribution and Selling rigamarole", including a bug with the handling of money. The magazine concluded that "although flawed in certain aspects, Phantasie II is an interesting, and overall good, game of the RPG type" and recommended it to fans of the first game. Reviewing the Atari ST version, Antic in 1987 liked the lack of disk-based copy protection and permadeath. The magazine concluded that Phantasie II "is very fun to play, and you will spend much time solving the puzzles". Antic also approved of the Atari 8-bit version, praising the "practically transparent user interface". It concluded that "Phantasie II is a fine addition to anyone's software library and a must to all adventurers".
