= Phantasie III =

1987 video game

- Developer: Winston Douglas Wood
- Publisher: Strategic Simulations
- Series: Phantasie
- Platforms: Apple II, Commodore 64, Amiga, Atari ST, MS-DOS, Sharp X1, PC-88, PC-98, FM-7, MSX, X68000
- Release: 1987
- Genre: Role-playing
- Mode: Single-player

Phantasie III: The Wrath of Nikademus is the third video game in the Phantasie series.

== Gameplay ==
Combat scene (Amiga)

The "final" installment of the Phantasie trilogy was based around fighting the evil Nikademus and finishing him for good. Released in 1987, this time Nikademus was attempting to take over the entire world and it was up to the party to stop him.

Phantasie III maintained the style of the original two and improved upon the graphics on all platforms except the MS-DOS version. The combat engine also saw a few upgrades, adding specific wound locations, with characters now able to have their head, torso, or a limb specifically injured, broken, or removed. It was also now possible to have a more tactical battle line-up, with the ability to move characters to the front, middle, or rear of the party. The game also improved upon the spell list and added a larger variety of weapons and equipment. The game also had two possible endings depending on whether the characters chose to fight Nikademus or join him.

== Reception ==
Phantasie III sold 46,113 copies. Computer Gaming World stated that "there are a few new wrinkles" in the game. The magazine's Scorpia was pleased by Phantasie III improving the trading interface and combat, and by the "grand ending" to the game and the trilogy, but called the game "by far the weakest in the series" and criticized its short length. Phantasie III was reviewed in 1988 in Dragon #130 by Hartley, Patricia, and Kirk Lesser in "The Role of Computers" column. The reviewers gave the game 4 out of 5 stars.

Phantasie I, Phantasie III, and Questron II were later re-released together, and reviewed in 1994 in Dragon #203 by Sandy Petersen in the "Eye of the Monitor" column. Petersen gave the compilation 2 out of 5 stars.
