= Questron II =

1988 video game

- Developers: Quest Software; Westwood Associates
- Publisher: Strategic Simulations
- Designers: Charles W. Dougherty; John Dougherty
- Programmers: Ethan Grimes; Barry Green
- Artist: Matthew Au
- Composer: Paul Mudra
- Platforms: Commodore 64, Apple II, Apple IIGS, Atari ST, Amiga, IBM PC
- Release: January 1988
- Genre: Role-playing
- Mode: Single-player

Questron II a 1988 role-playing video game published by Strategic Simulations for the Apple II, Apple IIGS, Atari ST, Commodore 64, IBM PC compatibles, and Amiga. It is the sequel to 1984's Questron. The story and original design is credited to Quest Software (John and Charles Dougherty), while the programming and artwork is credited to Westwood Associates.

== Plot ==
Scene from the Commodore 64 version

The player's character has been sent back in time to defeat six Mad Sorcerers before they can create the Book of Magic featured in the original game.

== Reception ==
Questron II outsold its predecessor by about 16,000 copies. Scorpia described the game as very similar to, but not as good as, the original. Questron II was reviewed in 1988 in Dragon #138 by Hartley, Patricia, and Kirk Lesser in "The Role of Computers" column. The reviewers gave the game 4 out of 5 stars.

Phantasie I, Phantasie III, and Questron II were later re-released together, and reviewed in 1994 in Dragon #203 by Sandy Petersen in the "Eye of the Monitor" column. Petersen gave the compilation 2 out of 5 stars.

== Legacy ==
Chuck and John Dougherty also created some similar games that were not direct sequels to Questron:

- Legacy of the Ancients
- The Legend of Blacksilver
