= Legacy of the Ancients =

1987 video game

- Developer: Quest Software
- Publisher: Electronic Arts
- Platforms: Apple II, Commodore 64, MS-DOS
- Release: 1987
- Genre: Role-playing
- Mode: Single-player

Legacy of the Ancients is a fantasy role-playing video game published by Electronic Arts in 1987 in which the player, taking on the role of a unsuspecting shepherd, is magically whisked away to the Galactic Museum on a quest to destroy a magical artifact.

== Gameplay ==
The player takes on the role of a young shepherd who finds and loots a recently dead body while on a first trip to the city, taking a black disk, a bracelet, and a leather scroll. The Galactic Museum mysteriously appears to the player after collecting these items. The player learns that by taking these items, he has become the next in a line of adventurers attempting to destroy the Wizard's Compendium, the leather scroll the player picked up.

The museum has various display cases that require the insertion of special coins of various types to access. Some coins can be bought in random encounters with NPCs, some can be found as loot after combat, and some coins can only be found at the bottom level of various dungeons, meaning the player cannot proceed beyond a certain point until that dungeon is finished.

Unlike many RPGs, the game does not use an experience point system. The player gains levels only through the successful completion of various quests.

The game is mostly in top-down style for the world maps, towns, and castles, but switches to a 3D style in the dungeons and in the museum.

Several different areas of the game, like games in towns and certain museum displays, allow the character to play in special mini-games, which, if done successfully, will permanently increase attributes. Also, various casinos about the towns let players gamble to win money. It is also possible to rob banks in cities, but this attracts the attention of the town guards, who will remember the robbery until the player enters another town.

== Copy protection ==
The game makes use of a code wheel copy protection that requires the player to match a gemstone and the name of a world on which another branch of the Galactic Museum exists. The player then has to enter a six-digit number to proceed. One of the worlds on the disk, Bantross, became the setting for the sequel, The Legend of Blacksilver.

Another part of the copy protection involves an attempt by the program to modify the program disk itself on startup and render it unusable. On authentic game disks, this operation fails since the disks are write-protected. When playing the game using an emulator, it is advisable to set the read-only attribute for each disk image to avoid this modification.

== Development ==
Legacy of the Ancients shares a similar design to Questron. Although not a sequel, it uses an updated engine shared by Questron and Questron II, and the same developers worked on the games.

== Reception ==
Computer Gaming World in 1987 described Legacy of the Ancients as "an advancement by the design team that created Questron", with "more lavish use of color than its predecessor". The following year, Scorpia reviewed the game and enjoyed the museum setting, but noted there was very little interaction with the world. She described the game's difficulty as "suitable for beginner and intermediate-level play". Six years after the game's publication, Scorpia called the game "a hack'n'slash of moderate interest".

In Issue 131 of Dragon, Hartley, Patricia, and Kirk Lesser called this game "Entertaining and exciting ... [It] The Legacy of the Ancients provides many exciting events and is extremely easy to master." They warned, however, that "Both land and water adventures await the intrepid player. All of this maneuvering requires thought for eventual success in destroying the Wizard's Compendium." The Lessers concluded by giving the game a rating of 3½ out of five, saying, "The Legacy of the Ancients is a great deal of fun. Although it is not the most challenging adventure game on the market today, it is one that Apple II and C64/128 gamers should consider."

In Issue 13 of Gateways, Charles and Sydney Barouch called this game "A good example of the genre." The Barouches were frustrated sometimes, noting "It is very easy to run out of things to do. You know there is more going on, but the game relies heavily on your being able to read the designers' minds at some point." They warned, "Choose your path carefully if you wish to get any kind of playing time from the game."
