= Questron (video game) =

1984 video game

- Developer: Strategic Simulations
- Publisher: Strategic Simulations
- Designers: Charles Dougherty; Gerald Wieczorek
- Programmer: John C. Dougherty
- Platforms: Apple II, Atari 8-bit, Commodore 64
- Release: 1984
- Genre: Role-playing
- Mode: Single-player

Questron is a 1984 game from Strategic Simulations, the first fantasy title from a company known for computer wargames. It was written by Charles Dougherty and Gerald Wieczorek and released for the Apple II, Atari 8-bit computers, and Commodore 64. A sequel, Questron II, was released in 1988.

After an out-of-court settlement, the structure and style of the game were both officially licensed from Richard Garriott, author of Akalabeth and Ultima.

== Gameplay ==
Outside Geraldtown (C64)

In the first Questron game, the player takes on the role of a young serf who tries to make a name for himself by traveling the realm in order to gain the power and experience necessary to defeat the wicked "Mantor", ruler of the "Land of Evil".

The view is mostly in top-down style for the world maps and town encounters, but switches to a first-person style in the dungeons of the Land of Evil. Some features were novel for a game of its type at the time of its release. First there are two "games within a game" that allow the character to permanently increase dexterity or intelligence attributes if completed successfully. Also, various casinos about the towns allow the player to gamble for gold pieces in games of blackjack, roulette, and double or nothing.

Various monsters and foes are immune or more vulnerable to different weapons. The player would occasionally have to switch weapons depending on which enemy they faced in order to defeat them. Magic spells can also be cast, but only in the dungeon levels.

== Reception ==
Questron was SSI's first RPG, and became the fastest-selling new game in the company's history at almost 35,000 copies in North America, more than triple the sales of the typical SSI game. Others followed, such as Phantasie, Wizard's Crown, Gemstone Warrior, and the Advanced Dungeons & Dragons Gold Box games.

Computer Gaming World in 1984 wrote that "if you are in need of a new and challenging role-playing game similar in play to the Ultima scenarios, then look no further". James A. McPherson praised the 3-D dungeons and "an ending fit for a king", and concluded that "the differences from the Ultima type game do make Questron refreshing. I await the sequels". The magazine's Scorpia in 1991 and 1993 also liked the game and praised the ending. Ahoy! in 1985 praised the Commodore 64 version of Questron, describing it as "one of those game that you start playing and suddenly realize it's three hours past bedtime. SSI should label the box 'potentially hazardous to your sleep'".

== Legacy ==
Chuck and John Dougherty also created some similar games that were not direct sequels to Questron or Questron II:

- Legacy of the Ancients
- The Legend of Blacksilver
