= Phantasie =

1985 video game

- Developer: Strategic Simulations
- Publisher: Strategic Simulations
- Designer: Winston Douglas Wood
- Writer: Winston Douglas Wood
- Series: Phantasie
- Platforms: Apple II, Commodore 64, MS-DOS, Atari 8-bit, Atari ST, Amiga, MSX, FM-7, Sharp X1, PC-98
- Release: 1985
- Genre: Role-playing
- Mode: Single-player

Phantasie is a videogame created and published by Strategic Simulations (SSI) in 1985 that is inspired by fantasy role-playing games like Dungeons & Dragons and Runequest. It was the first in the Phantasie series.

== Gameplay ==
Screenshot of the Amiga version

A group of six adventurers explores the Isle of Gelnor and tries to defeat the evil Black Knights and their sorcerer leader, Nikademus.

=== Character creation ===
Players can choose to be one of six character classes, all drawn from Dungeons & Dragons: Thief, Fighter, Ranger, Monk, Priest, and Wizard. Each character class has unique fighting styles and options and all characters can choose their strategy for a particular round in the turn-based combat segments.

Likewise, players can choose between the races of Human, Dwarf, Halfling, Elf, or Gnome. By selecting "Random", one can also choose from ogre, troll, pixie, gnoll, orc, lizard man, Minotaur, and other races.

After a combat, experience is awarded, but the players have to return to town to purchase their levels if they qualify. A town window also allows purchases in various shops.

The game uses a top-down view for dungeon crawls and the world map, but uses a separate window for combat.

== Development ==
Creator Winston Douglas Wood stated that the Wizardry and Ultima were his inspirations when creating Phantasie, while basic mechanics of combat and character development were inspired by the fantasy role-playing game RuneQuest.

Regarding the inspiration behind the character of Nikademus, Wood said that he read Tolkien and studied Greek mythology and culture, including The Chronicles of Narnia and other fantasy novels, using all elements from them as inspiration. The name of the character comes from Nicodemus, a character from the book Mrs. Frisby and the Rats of NIMH; he thought that it sounded like a bad-guy name but also realized that it was also the name of a Biblical character, and he changed the spelling of the character Nicodemus to Nikademus.

The result was Phantasie, which was published by SSI in 1985. The second and third parts of a Phantasie trilogy were published in 1986 and 1987.

In 1994, Phantasie I, Phantasie III, and Questron II were re-released in one package.

== Reception ==
With more than 50,000 copies sold in North America, Phantasie was very successful for SSI. By the end of 1987, it was the company's best-selling Commodore 64 game.

In Issue 120 of Dragon, Hartley and Pattie Lesser complimented the Atari ST version of Phantasie, recommending that Atari ST owners should "consider Phantasie as a game well-worth their attention".

Writing for ANALOG Computing, Steve Panak called Phantasie and its sequel the best fantasy role-playing games for the Atari 8-bit.

Computer Gaming World's Scorpia called Phantasie "a surprisingly good little game, with many interesting features".

In Issue 5 of Gateways, Thomas and Cynthia Than commented "The game itself is well designed for role-playing purposes. There are several character classes and races, over forty spells, several qualities of weapons and armor, and over eighty different creature types."

In Issue 203 of Dragon, Sandy Petersen reviewed the recently-published collection of Phantasie I, Phantasie II and Questron II and noted, "The games date from years back, and it shows. They are in CGA four-color art, with pathetic animation, and no sound support. On the other hand, the plots and adventures are just as much fun as they ever were, and the package containing the three games is incredibly cheap." Petersen concluded by giving this package a rating of 2 out of 4, saying, "it was a bit refreshing to see a blast from my past. So often old computer games, both fun and not so fun, vanish into nothingness and are never heard of again."
