= Serpent in the Staglands =

2015 video game

- Developer: Whalenought Studios
- Publisher: Whalenought Studios
- Engine: Unity
- Platforms: Microsoft Windows, OS X, Linux
- Release: 28 May 2015
- Genre: Role-playing
- Mode: Single-player

Serpent in the Staglands is an old-school isometric computer role-playing game developed by independent game developer Whalenought Studios for Microsoft Windows, OS X and Linux. Using the tagline "a 90s CRPG in every way but the release date", The game resembles several classic games such as Fallout, Baldur's Gate, and Darklands. The game is notable for being "old-school", lacking several features seen in modern RPGs such as introductory or tutorial levels, automatically updated journals and quest-markers. It also has a distinct pixelated graphics style. The game uses the Unity Technologies' Unity engine.

In Serpent of the Staglands, the player assumes the role of Necholai, a lesser god who has descended to Earth to take part in a festival in his honor. However, once the festivities are over, an unseen force prevents Necholai from leaving his mortal form and returning to home. Necholai disguises yourself as a spice merchant, trying to move unnoticed throughout the land in an endeavor to find out who is blocking his passage to the astral planes so that he can reclaim his immortality.

The game was the subject of a successful Kickstarter campaign raising $28,058 from 1,092 backers. It was released via the Whalenought website as well as GOG.com, Steam and Humble Store on 28 May 2015. Josh Sawyer and Feargus Urquhart from Obsidian Entertainment were among the backers. An expansion pack is currently under development.

Despite initially being "almost completely ignored by the specialized press", the game garnered favorable reviews and impressions.

== Gameplay ==
The game features a classless role-playing system reminiscent of the SPECIAL system used in Fallout. The player is free to create builds using any combination of the magic, combat and aptitude skills available. The player creates their character at the start of the game, and can create up to five more. Alternatively, they can recruit companions in the game world. A noteworthy feature is the ability to bind the souls of these companions to the will of the player character, preventing them from leaving the party. The game allows open world sandbox exploration, meaning that the player is free to move about the map and solve quests in any order desired. The game also features a non-linear storyline, with multiple endings according to the choices made by the player.

Combat has been noted by reviewers to be brutal. It uses real-time with pause, as popularized by Infinity Engine games such as Baldur's Gate and Icewind Dale, as well as the more recent Pillars of Eternity. The player is encouraged to pause often to take tactical decisions, using the abilities of the different party members. While one reviewer noted that he died "repeatedly despite learning how to manage combat", he nevertheless described combat as "strategic" and "fun".

=== Setting ===
Serpent in the Staglands takes place in the world of Vol. Despite being a fantasy world, it is inspired by the actual Bronze Age and heavily influenced by medieval Transylvania. Despite the presence of classic fantasy elements such as magic, the game is known for its gritty, realistic and dark tone. This makes many gamers draw parallels to Darklands.

"Featuring a chosen party of five, you take the role of Necholai, a minor god of a celestial body, who descends to the Staglands for a moonlit festival only to find his way home blocked and immortality slipping out of his grasp. Seeking answers and aid, he takes on a mortal body and the guise of a traveling Spicer".

== Development ==
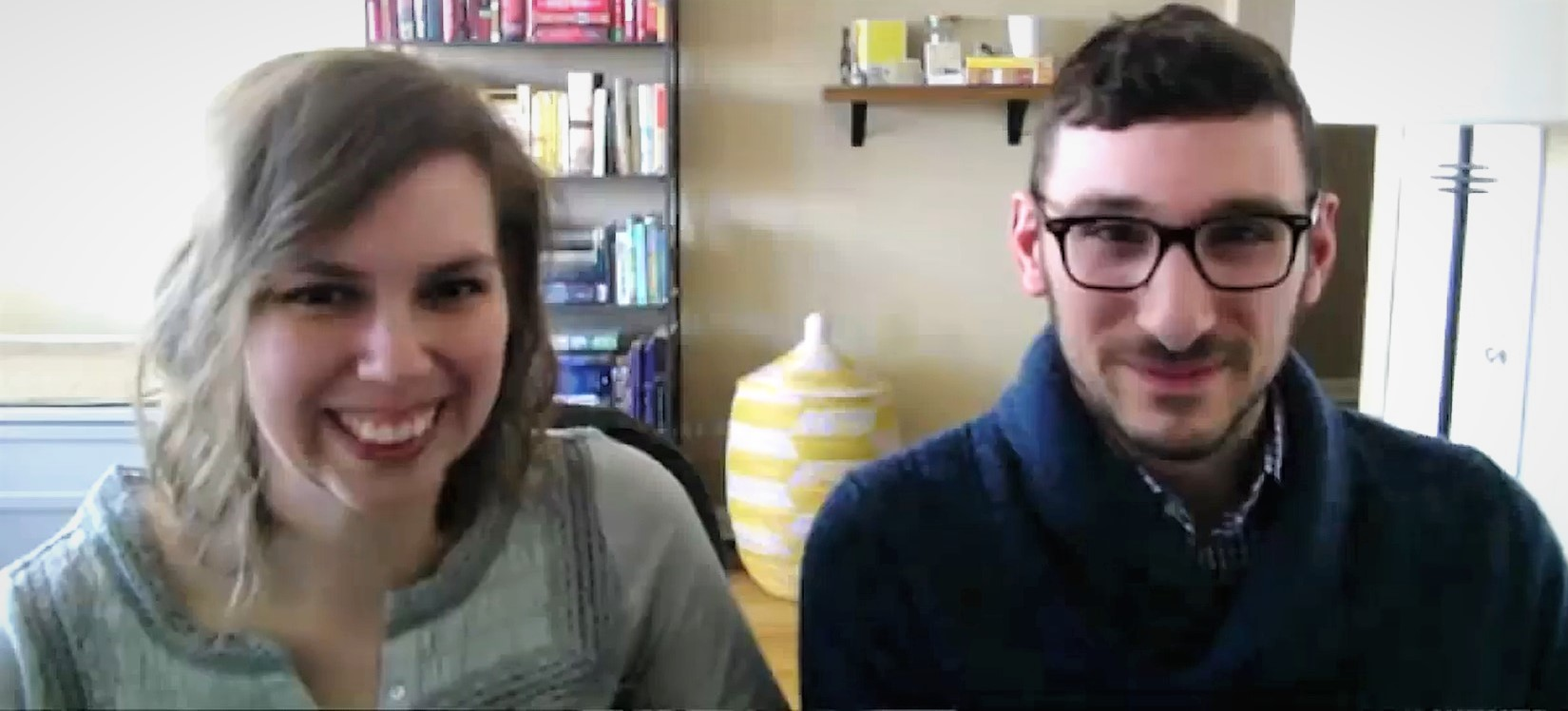
Hannah and Joe Williams interviewed on Matt Chat in 2015

Serpent in the Staglands was developed by Whalenought Studios, which is a husband-and-wife team consisting of Joe and Hannah. Joe takes care of art and animation duties, while Hannah is responsible for programming and writing. While based in Chicago during development, the company moved to Seattle after its release. The initial game design for Serpent in the Staglands started in winter 2013. The Kickstarter campaign ran over a 30-day period from 27 March 2014 until 26 April 2014. It exceeded the initial $10,000 funding goal, allowing for several stretch goals to be reached including the expansion pack. Serpent in the Staglands was created using Unity 3D. Parts of the Kickstarter funds went towards buying Unity 3D Pro, which featured more efficient path finding technology and optimized lighting solutions.

Joe and Hannah appeared on Matt Chat episodes 284-286 to discuss the making the game.

== Release ==
The initial planned release date was winter 2014. The game was postponed until 28 May 2015, however, to allow for additional bug testing and polish.

=== Expansion pack ===
As announced during the Kickstarter campaign, an expansion to the game is currently in development. It will be made available for free to those who purchased the game, either prior or subsequent to the Kickstarter campaign.

== Reception ==
Reception

Aggregate score
Aggregator	Score
Metacritic	74/100

While Serpent in the Staglands was initially "almost completely ignored by the specialized press" at the time of release, reviews and impressions from (mainly smaller) gaming sites have since appeared.

True PC Gaming lauds the variety of character creation options, emphasizing that "there's a nice selection of races and subcultures to pick from, with unique bonuses attached to each. These choices are supplied with a staggering amount of back history for both alike". He also notes that "Serpent in the Staglands is one gorgeous game", and that "the music composition is fantastic and perfectly suits both the feel and art style of the game". He is critical about the user interface, however, stating that the "old fashioned HUD tries to fit a large number of buttons so close together that it often confused me what each one did, even after many times using them" and misses the option to compare items. He concludes; "I've played some difficult games in my time, but I can't remember any that left my lead character crumpled in a bloody heap on the cold ground so frequently as Serpent in the Staglands. It's quite a task to nail down a solid conclusion about this game, as I feel like the overall enjoyment experienced will vary drastically based on the type of player. That being said, there's much to be appreciated by all audiences, and I wholeheartedly recommend traditional RPG fans to buy this game now".

Richard Cobbett describes the game in an article for Rock, Paper, Shotgun. He finds that "the needlessly frustrating opening" is to the game's detriment because stat descriptions "largely assumes you're coming to the game from things like Dungeons and Dragons". He goes on to say that "this game painfully, desperately needs a Getting Started type guide. There's a manual, which is not optional, but even that is a weak introduction". To the game's credit, he goes on to say that "the frustrating/good thing is that behind all of this waits a surprisingly good RPG. It's bursting with carefully designed areas and clever ideas, as well some really fun gimmicks. You can start with just yourself, or use your god powers to create a few extra empty shells to back you up until you find suitable NPCs to fill slots. When they're recruited, you can either take them warts and all or use your power to just straight up steal their souls, removing their tiresome free will". In conclusion, he finds that "there's a lot of really good stuff here, and the game is mostly excellent, but the path to actually getting into the damn thing is far more frustrating than it is rewarding. Once past it, the amount of freedom it offers in everything from character builds to your path around an open world designed to reward exploration is all great, and knowing the carrot is there does help. Even so, do be sure you have the dedication to keep chasing it while being brutally beaten with the stick".

Finally, the game was also reviewed by two Greek gaming sites, Greek Gamer and Ragequit.gr. The latter awarded the game 90/100.
