= Phantasie (series) =

1980s video game series

- Genre: Role-playing
- Developer: Winston Douglas Wood
- Publisher: Strategic Simulations

Phantasie is a fantasy role-playing video game series designed by Winston Douglas Wood and published by Strategic Simulations in 1985. It was released for the Apple II, Atari 8-bit computers, Atari ST, Amiga, Commodore 64, MS-DOS, and MSX.

== Phantasie ==
Based on the Isle of Gelnor, Phantasie allows a group of six characters to adventure the countryside and try to defeat the evil Black Knights and their sorcerer leader, Nikademus. Players could choose to be one of six character classes (Thief, Fighter, Ranger, Monk, Priest and Wizard) and could also choose between the races of Human, Dwarf, Halfling, Elf, or Gnome. By selecting "Random" one could also choose from ogre, troll, pixie, gnoll, orc, lizard man, Minotaur, and other races.

== Phantasie II ==
In 1986, SSI published the next part of the series, Phantasie II. Again, the Dark Lord Nikademus was the nemesis. This time Nikademus had fashioned an evil orb, and with it he cast a curse on a beautiful island named Ferronrah and enslaved its people. The player's mission was to find and destroy the orb.

== Phantasie III: The Wrath of Nikademus ==
The "final" installment of the trilogy was based around fighting the evil Nikademus and finishing him for good. Released in 1987, this time Nikademus was attempting to take over the entire world and it was up to the party to stop him.

== Phantasie IV: Birth of Heroes ==
This entry was a Japan-exclusive for the PC-9801 and MSX, with no English translation.

== Reception ==
With more than 50,000 copies sold in North America, Phantasie was very successful for SSI. It was the company's best-selling Commodore game as of late 1987. Phantasie II sold 30,100 copies, while Phantasie III sold 46,113 copies.

Phantasie I, Phantasie III, and Questron II were later re-released together, and reviewed in 1994 in Dragon #203 by Sandy Petersen in the "Eye of the Monitor" column. Petersen gave the compilation 2 out of 5 stars.
