= Role-playing video game =

Video game genre

Role-playing video games (RPGs), also known as computer role-playing games (CRPGs), comprise a broad video game genre generally defined by a detailed story and character advancement (often through increasing characters' levels or other skills). Role-playing games almost always feature combat as a defining feature and traditionally used turn-based combat; however, modern role-playing games commonly feature real-time action combat or even non-violent forms of conflict resolution (with some eschewing combat altogether). Furthermore, many games have incorporated role-playing elements such as character advancement and quests while remaining within other genres.

Role-playing video games have their origins in tabletop role-playing games and use much of the same terminology, settings, and game mechanics. Other major similarities with pen-and-paper games include developed story-telling and narrative elements, player-character development, and elaborately designed fantasy worlds. The electronic medium takes the place of the gamemaster, resolving combat on its own and determining the game's response to different player actions. RPGs have evolved from simple text-based console-window games into visually rich 3D experiences.

The first RPGs date to the mid-1970s, when developers attempted to implement systems like Dungeons & Dragons on university mainframe computers. While initially niche, RPGs would soon become mainstream on consoles like the NES with franchises such as Dragon Quest and Final Fantasy. Western RPGs for home computers became popular through series such as Fallout, The Elder Scrolls and Baldur's Gate. Today, RPGs enjoy significant popularity both as mainstream AAA games and as niche titles aimed towards dedicated audiences. More recently, independent developers have found success, with games such as Clair Obscure Expedition 33, Deltarune and Sea of Stars achieving both critical and commercial success.

== Characteristics ==
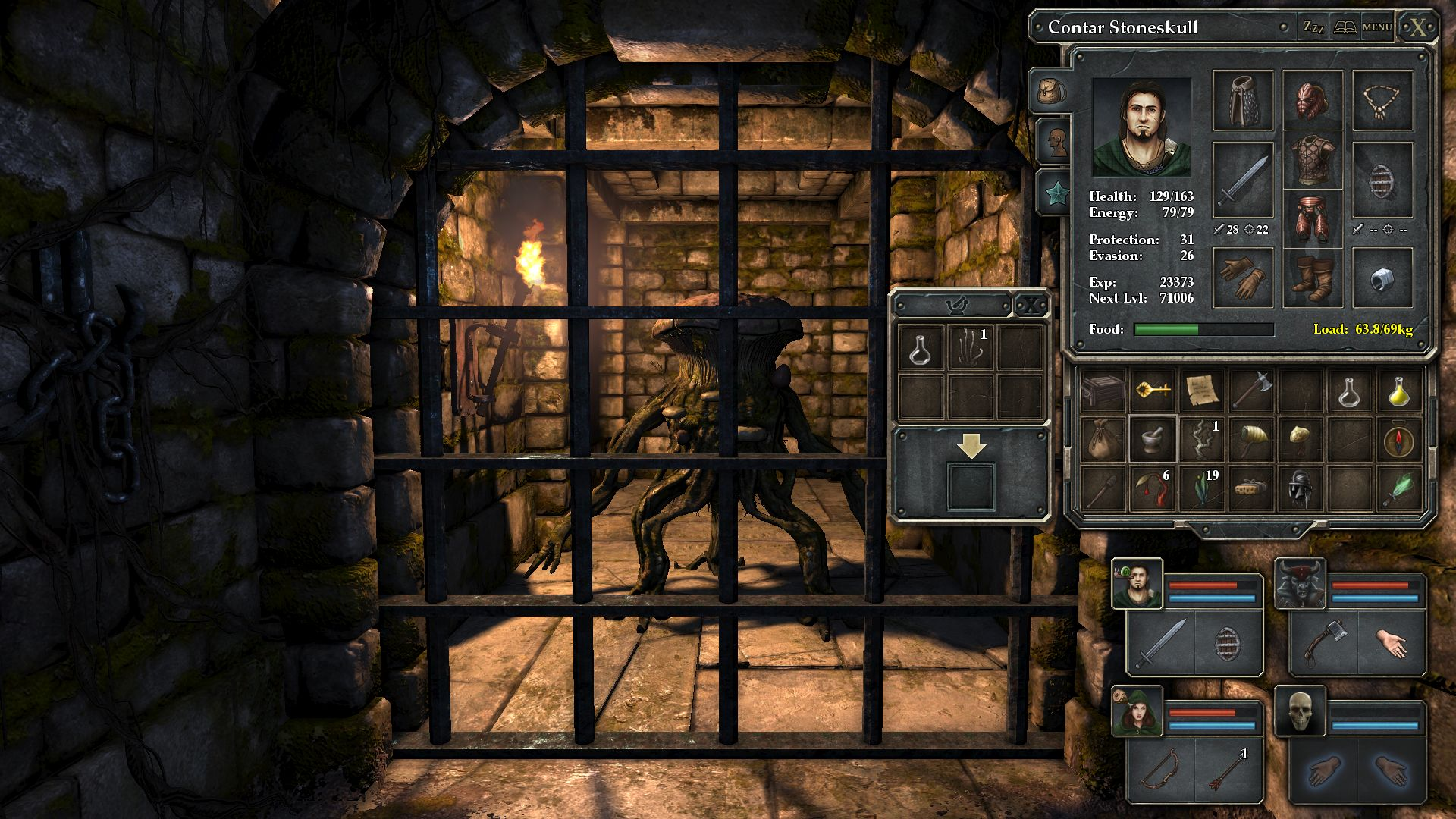
A party of characters approaching a monster in Legend of Grimrock (2012)

Role-playing video games use much of the same terminology, settings and game mechanics as early tabletop role-playing games such as Dungeons & Dragons. Players control a central game character, or multiple game characters, usually called a party. These characters are controlled by issuing commands, which are then performed by the character at an effectiveness determined by that character's numeric attributes. Often these attributes increase each time a character gains a level, and a character's level goes up each time the player accumulates a certain amount of experience. Usually, the characters attain victory by completing a series of quests or reaching the conclusion of a central storyline. Players explore a game world, while solving puzzles and engaging in combat.

Role-playing games are traditionally divided into turn-based RPGs, which rarely challenge a player's physical coordination or reaction time, and action-based RPGs, which do the opposite.

Role-playing video games typically rely on a highly developed story and setting, and characters are typically designed by the player. Role-playing video games also typically attempt to offer more complex and dynamic character interaction than what is found in other video game genres. This usually involves additional focus on the artificial intelligence and scripted behavior of computer-controlled non-player characters.

=== Experience and levels ===
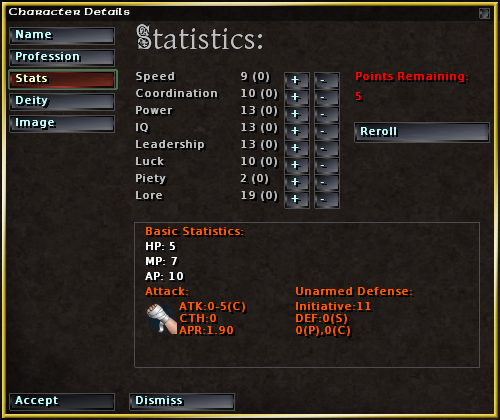
An example of character creation in an RPG. In this particular game, players can assign points into attributes, select a deity, and choose a portrait and profession for their character.

In order to be considered a role-playing game, characters have to become more functionally powerful by gaining new skills, weapons, and magic. This creates a positive-feedback cycle that is central to these games: the player grows in power, allowing them to overcome more difficult challenges, and gain even more power. This is part of the appeal of the genre, where players experience growing from an ordinary person into a superhero with amazing powers. Whereas other games give the player these powers immediately, the player in a role-playing game will choose their powers and skills as they gain experience.

Three different systems of rewarding the player characters for solving the tasks in the game can be set apart: the experience system (also known as the "level-based" system), the training system (also known as the "skill-based" system) and the skill-point system (also known as "level-free" system)

- The experience system, by far the most common, was inherited from pen-and-paper role-playing games and emphasizes receiving "experience points" (often abbreviated "XP" or "EXP") by winning battles, performing class-specific activities, and completing quests. Once a certain amount of experience is gained, the character advances a level. In some games, level-up occurs automatically when the required amount of experience is reached; in others, the player can choose when and where to advance a level. Likewise, abilities and attributes may increase automatically or manually.
- The training system is similar to the way the Basic Role-Playing system works. The first notable video game to use this was Dungeon Master, which emphasized developing the character's skills by using them, meaning that if a character wields a sword for some time, he or she will become proficient with it.
- Finally, in the skill-point system (as used in Vampire: The Masquerade – Bloodlines for example) the character is rewarded with "skill points" for completing quests, which then can be directly used to buy skills and attributes without having to wait until the next level up.

In some video games from the Eighties and Nineties, the score was called "Experience" in-game, but this did not make them role-playing games, if there was no character development.

=== Story and setting ===
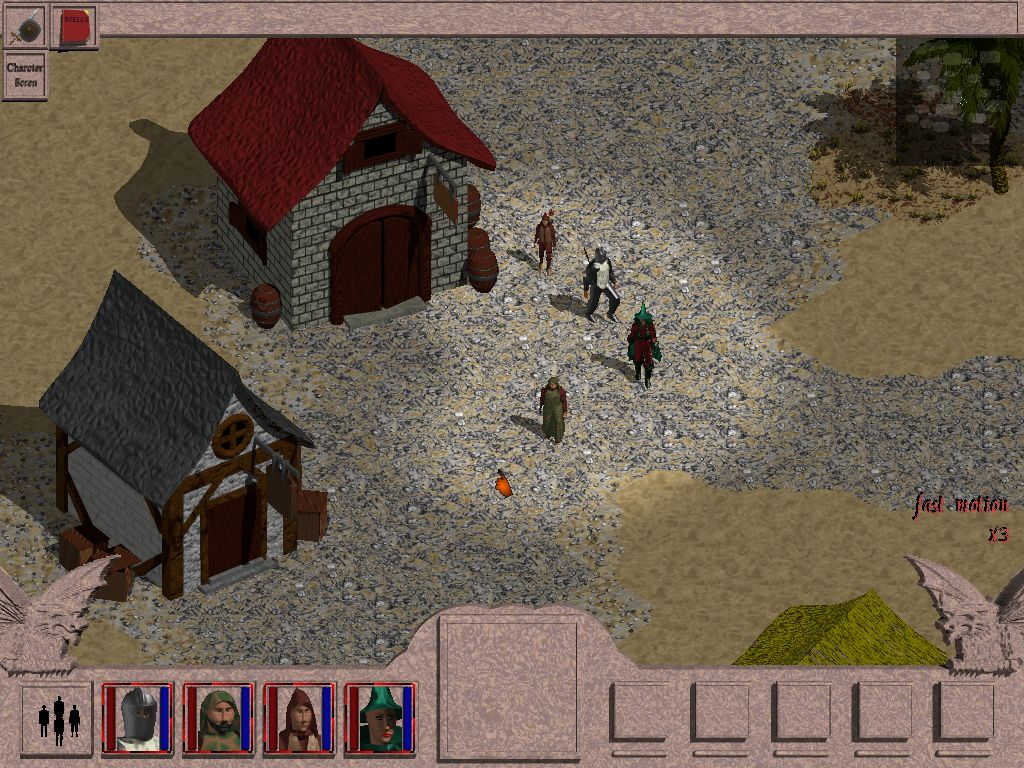
A party of adventurers in Tales of Trolls & Treasures (2002)

The premise of many role-playing games tasks the player with saving the world, or whichever level of society is threatened. There are often twists and turns as the story progresses, such as the surprise appearance of estranged relatives, or enemies who become friends or vice versa. The game world is often rooted in speculative fiction (i.e. fantasy or science fiction), which allows players to do things they cannot do in real life and helps players suspend their disbelief about the rapid character growth. To a lesser extent, settings closer to the present day or near future are possible.

The story often provides much of the entertainment in the game. Because these games have strong storylines, they can often make effective use of recorded dialog and voiceover narration. Players of these games tend to appreciate long cutscenes more than players of faster action games. While most games advance the plot when the player defeats an enemy or completes a level, role-playing games often progress the plot based on other important decisions. For example, a player may make the decision to join a guild, thus triggering a progression in the storyline that is usually irreversible. New elements in the story may also be triggered by mere arrival in an area, rather than completing a specific challenge. The plot is usually divided so that each game location is an opportunity to reveal a new chapter in the story.

Pen-and-paper role-playing games typically involve a player called the gamemaster (or GM for short) who can dynamically create the story, setting, and rules, and react to a player's choices. In role-playing video games, the computer performs the function of the gamemaster. This offers the player a smaller set of possible actions, since computers can't engage in imaginative acting comparable to a skilled human gamemaster. In exchange, the typical role-playing video game may have storyline branches, user interfaces, and stylized cutscenes and gameplay to offer a more direct storytelling mechanism. Characterization of non-player characters in video games is often handled using a dialog tree. Saying the right things to the right non-player characters will elicit useful information for the player, and may even result in other rewards such as items or experience, as well as opening up possible storyline branches. Multiplayer online role-playing games can offer an exception to this contrast by allowing human interaction among multiple players and in some cases enabling a player to perform the role of a gamemaster.

=== Exploration and quests ===
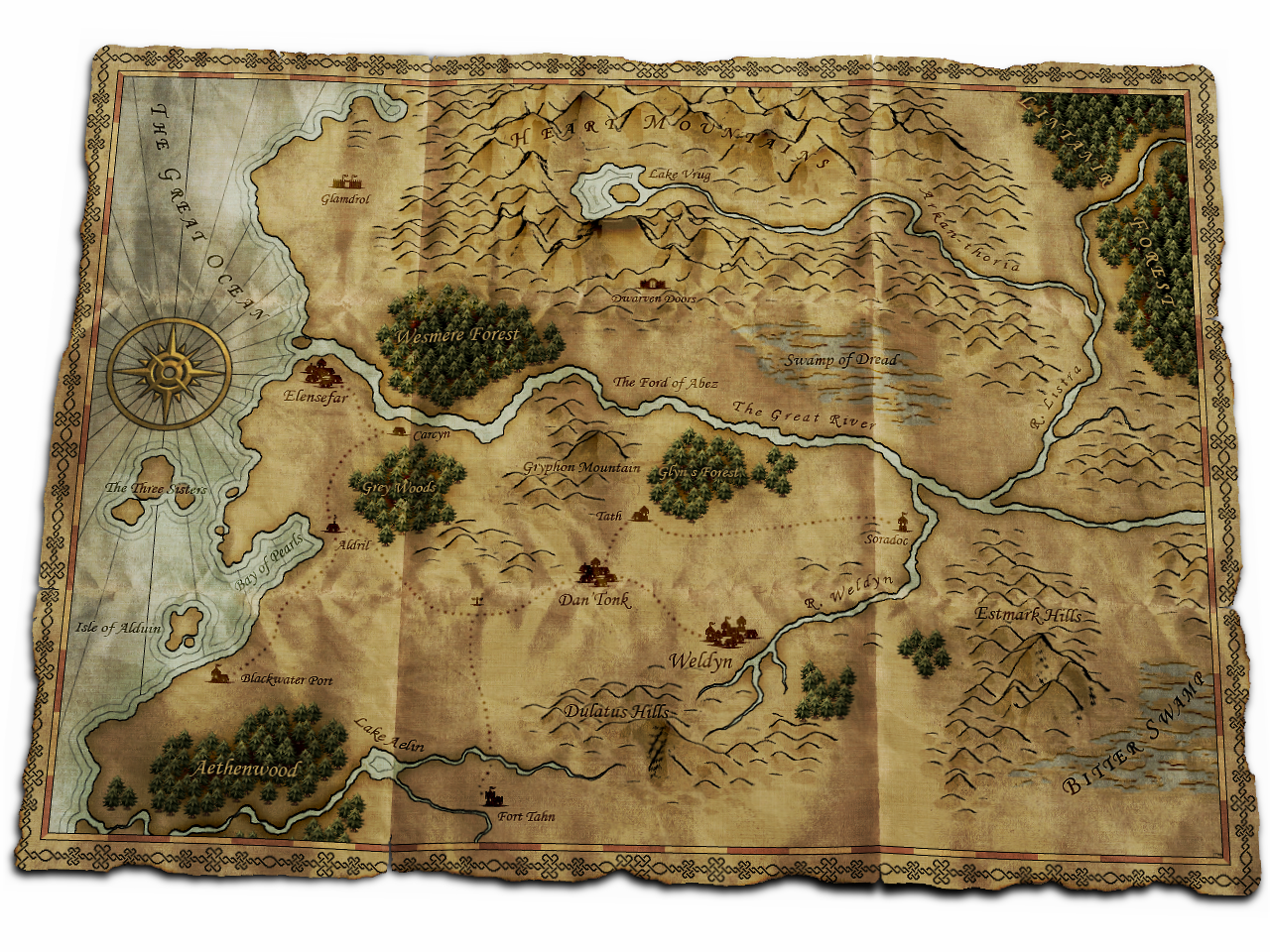
Overworld map from The Battle for Wesnoth (2003)

Exploring the world is an important aspect of many RPGs. Players will walk through, talking to non-player characters, picking up objects, and avoiding traps. Some games such as NetHack, Diablo, and the FATE series randomize the structure of individual levels, increasing the game's variety and replay value. Role-playing games where players complete quests by exploring randomly generated dungeons and which include permadeath are called roguelikes, named after the 1980 video game Rogue.

The game's story is often mapped onto exploration, where each chapter of the story is mapped onto a different location. RPGs usually allow players to return to previously visited locations. Usually, there is nothing left to do there, although some locations change throughout the story and offer the player new things to do in response. Players must acquire enough power to overcome a major challenge in order to progress to the next area, and this structure can be compared to the boss characters at the end of levels in action games.

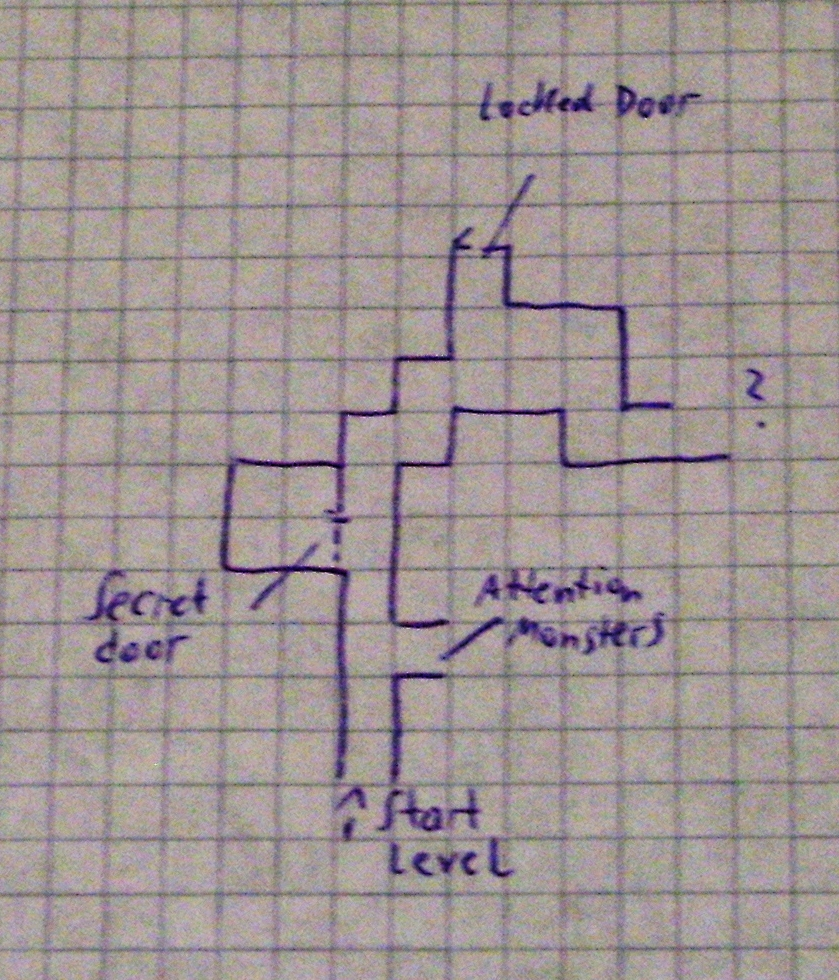
Example of a dungeon map drawn by hand on graph paper. This practice was common among players of early role-playing games, such as early titles in the Wizardry and Might and Magic series. Later on, games of this type started featuring automaps.

The player typically must complete a linear sequence of certain quests in order to reach the end of the game's story. Many RPGs also often allow the player to seek out optional side-quests and character interactions. Quests of this sort can be found by talking to a non-player character, and there may be no penalty for abandoning or ignoring these quests other than a missed opportunity or reward.

=== Items and inventory ===
Players can find loot (such as clothing, weapons, and armor) throughout the game world and collect it. Players can trade items for currency and better equipment. Trade takes place while interacting with certain friendly non-player characters, such as shopkeepers, and often uses a specialized trading screen. Purchased items go into the player's inventory. Some games turn inventory management into a logistical challenge by limiting the size of the player's inventory, thus forcing the player to decide what they must carry at the time. This can be done by limiting the maximum weight that a player can carry, by employing a system of arranging items in a virtual space, or by simply limiting the number of items that can be held.

=== Character actions and abilities ===
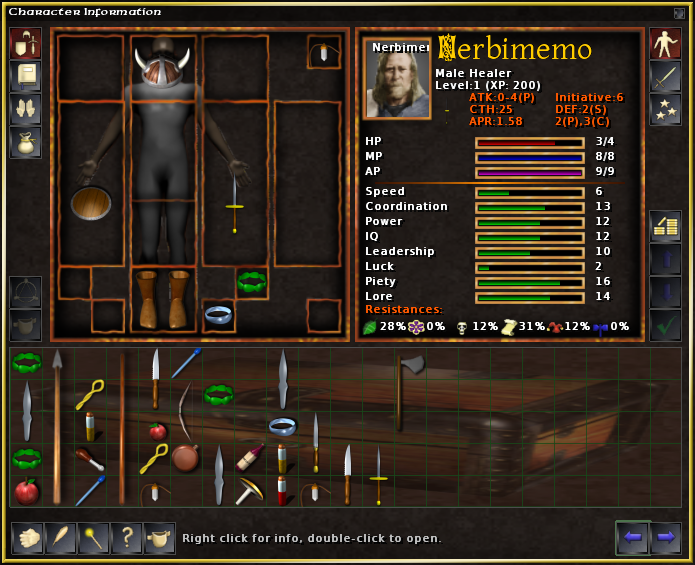
Character information and inventory screen in a typical computer role-playing game. Pictured here is the roguelike-like S.C.O.U.R.G.E.: Heroes of Lesser Renown. Note the paper doll in the top left portion of the image.

Most of the actions in a Role-Playing Game are performed indirectly, with the player selecting an action and the character performing it by their own accord. Success at that action depends on the character's numeric attributes. Role-playing video games often simulate dice-rolling mechanics from non-electronic role-playing games to determine success or failure. As a character's attributes improve, their chances of succeeding at a particular action will increase.

Many role-playing games allow players to play as an evil character. Although robbing and murdering indiscriminately may make it easier to get money, there are usually consequences in that other characters will become uncooperative or even hostile towards the player. Thus, these games allow players to make moral choices, but force players to live with the consequences of their actions. Games often let the player control an entire party of characters. However, if winning is contingent upon the survival of a single character, then that character effectively becomes the player's avatar. An example of this would be in Baldur's Gate, where if the character created by the player dies, the game ends and a previous save needs to be loaded.

Although some single-player role-playing games give the player an avatar that is largely predefined for the sake of telling a specific story, many role-playing games make use of a character creation screen. This allows players to choose their character's sex, their race or species, and their character class. Although many of these traits are cosmetic, there are functional aspects as well. Character classes will have different abilities and strengths. Common classes include fighters, spellcasters, thieves with stealth abilities, and clerics with healing abilities, or a mixed class, such as a fighter who can cast simple spells. Characters will also have a range of physical attributes such as dexterity and strength, which affect a player's performance in combat. Mental attributes such as intelligence may affect a player's ability to perform and learn spells, while social attributes such as charisma may limit the player's choices while conversing with non-player characters. These attribute systems often strongly resemble the Dungeons & Dragons ruleset.

Some role-playing games make use of magical powers, or equivalents such as psychic powers or advanced technology. These abilities are confined to specific characters such as mages, spellcasters, or magic-users. In games where the player controls multiple characters, these magic-users usually complement the physical strength of other classes. Magic can be used to attack, defend, or temporarily change an enemy or ally's attributes. While some games allow players to gradually consume a spell, as ammunition is consumed by a gun, most games offer players a finite amount of mana which can be spent on any spell. Mana is restored by resting or by consuming potions. Characters can also gain other non-magical skills, which stay with the character for as long as the character lives.

Role-playing games may have the player focus only on a single character throughout the game; the character may be joined by computer-controlled allies outside of the player's control. Other games feature a party that the player can create at the start or gather from non-player characters in the game, coming into partial or full control of the player during the game.

=== Combat ===
Ranged magical combat in the party-based graphical roguelike-like Dungeon Monkey Eternal. The fireball being cast by the wizard in the image is an area of effect (AoE) attack, and damages multiple characters at once.

Older games often separated combat into its own mode of gameplay, distinct from exploring the game world. More recent games tend to maintain a consistent perspective for exploration and combat. Some games, especially earlier video games, generate battles from random encounters; more modern RPGs are more likely to have persistent wandering monsters that move about the game world independently of the player. Most RPGs also use stationary boss monsters in key positions, and automatically trigger battles with them when the PCs enter these locations or perform certain actions. Combat options typically involve positioning characters, selecting which enemy to attack, and exercising special skills such as casting spells.

In a classical turn-based system, only one character may act at a time; all other characters remain still, with a few exceptions that may involve the use of special abilities. The order in which the characters act is usually dependent on their attributes, such as speed or agility. This system rewards strategic planning more than quickness. It also points to the fact that realism in games is a means to the end of immersion in the game world, not an end in itself. A turn-based system makes it possible, for example, to run within range of an opponent and kill them before they get a chance to act, or duck out from behind hard cover, fire, and retreat back without an opponent being able to fire, which are of course both impossibilities. However, tactical possibilities have been created by this unreality that did not exist before; the player determines whether the loss of immersion in the reality of the game is worth the satisfaction gained from the development of the tactic and its successful execution. Fallout has been cited as being a good example of such a system.

Real-time combat can import features from action games, creating a hybrid action RPG game genre. But other RPG battle systems such as the Final Fantasy battle systems have imported real-time choices without emphasizing coordination or reflexes. Other systems combine real-time combat with the ability to pause the game and issue orders to all characters under their control; when the game is unpaused, all characters follow the orders they were given. This "real-time with pause" system (RTwP) has been particularly popular in games designed by BioWare. The most famous RTwP engine is the Infinity Engine. Other names for "real-time with pause" include "active pause" and "semi real-time". Tactical RPG maker Apeiron named their system Smart Pause Mode (SPM) because it would automatically pause based on a number of user-configurable settings. Fallout Tactics: Brotherhood of Steel and Arcanum: Of Steamworks and Magick Obscura offered players the option to play in either turn-based or RTwP mode via a configuration setting. The latter also offered a "fast turn-based" mode, though all three game modes were criticized for being poorly balanced and oversimplified.

Early Ultima games featured timed turns: they were strictly turn-based, but if the player waited more than a second or so to issue a command, the game would automatically issue a pass command, allowing the monsters to take a turn while the PCs did nothing.

There is a further subdivision by the structure of the battle system; in many early games, such as Wizardry, monsters and the party are arrayed into ranks, and can only attack enemies in the front rank with melee weapons. Other games, such as most of the Ultima series, employed duplicates of the miniatures combat system traditionally used in the early role-playing games. Representations of the player characters and monsters would move around an arena modeled after the surrounding terrain, attacking any enemies that are sufficiently close.

=== Interface and graphics ===
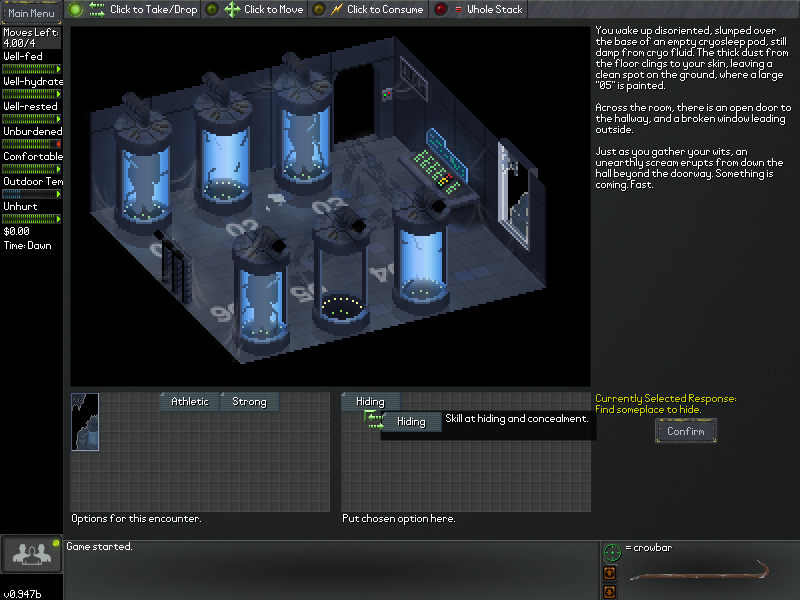
The graphical roguelike-like NEO Scavenger has text on the right indicating what events have transpired, and gives the players options (bottom) based on their character's abilities. At left is the character's current stats.

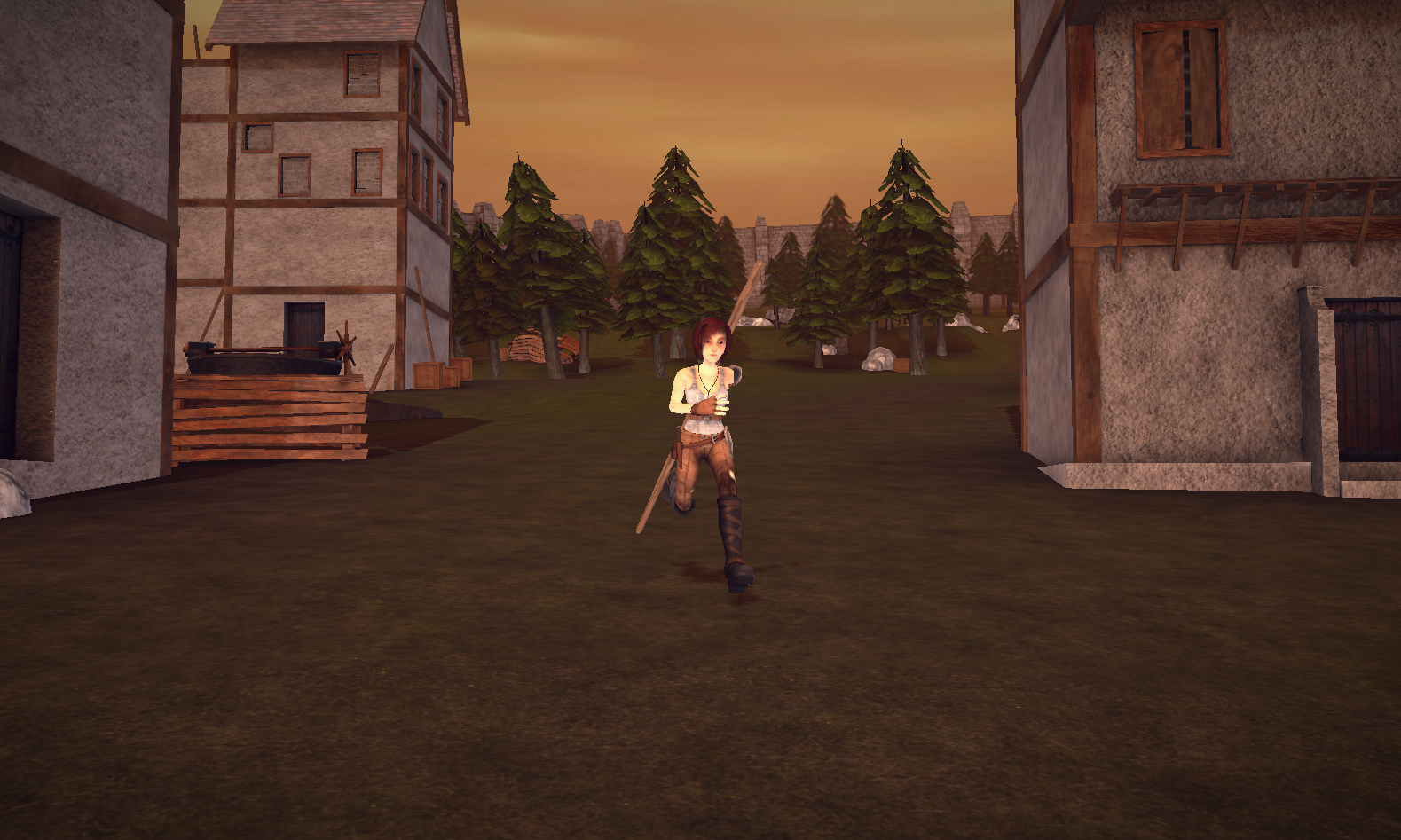
Starting in the mid-1990s with the advent of 3D graphics accelerators, real-time first- and third-person polygonal graphics also became common in CRPGs. Pictured here is Sintel The Game.

Earlier role-playing video games used a two-dimensional top-down view or tile-based first-person view. Early action-based role-playing games often used a side-scrolling view. Most notably since Ultima Underworld (1992), role-playing games started implementing true three-dimensional (3D) graphics, where players typically navigate the game world from a first or third-person perspective. However, an isometric or aerial top-down perspective is common in party-based RPGs, in order to give the player a clear view of their entire party and their surroundings.

Role-playing games require the player to manage a large amount of information and frequently use a windowed interface. For example, spell-casting characters will often have a menu of spells they can use. On the PC, players typically use the mouse to click on icons and menu options, while console games have the player navigate through menus using a game controller.

== History and classification ==
The role-playing video game genre began in the mid-1970s on mainframe computers, inspired by pen-and-paper role-playing games such as Dungeons & Dragons. Several other sources of inspiration for early role-playing video games also included tabletop wargames, sports simulation games, adventure games such as Colossal Cave Adventure, fantasy writings by authors such as J. R. R. Tolkien, traditional strategy games such as chess, and ancient epic literature dating back to Epic of Gilgamesh which followed the same basic structure of setting off in various quests in order to accomplish goals.

Originally, role-playing video games were classified into three main styles: roguelikes (named after Rogue, 1980) that focused on exploration of procedurally created mazes; dungeon crawlers (popularized by Wizardry, 1981), that took place within one or few dungeons, with little or no interaction with an outer world; and open worlds (popularized by Ultima, 1981), that include an explorable world surface with several dungeons, cities, continents, and more.

After the success of role-playing video games such as Ultima and Wizardry, which in turn served as the blueprint for Dragon Quest and Final Fantasy, the role-playing genre eventually diverged into two styles, Eastern role-playing games and Western role-playing games, due to cultural differences, though roughly mirroring the platform divide between consoles and computers, respectively. Finally, while the first RPGs strictly offered a single player experience, the popularity of multiplayer modes rose sharply during the early to mid-1990s with action role-playing games such as Secret of Mana and Diablo. With the advent of the Internet, multiplayer games have grown to become massively multiplayer online role-playing games (MMORPG), including Lineage, Final Fantasy XI, and World of Warcraft.

=== Mainframe computers ===
The role-playing video game genre began in the mid-1970s, as an offshoot of early university mainframe text-based RPGs on PDP-10 and Unix-based computers, such as Dungeon, pedit5 and dnd. In 1980, a very popular dungeon crawler, Rogue, was released. Featuring ASCII graphics where the setting, monsters and items were represented by letters and a deep system of gameplay, it inspired a whole genre of similar clones on mainframe and home computers called "roguelikes".

=== Personal computers ===
One of the earliest role-playing video games on a microcomputer was Dungeon n Dragons, written by Peter Trefonas and published by CLOAD (1980). This early game, published for a TRS-80 Model 1, is just 16K long and includes a limited word parser command line, character generation, a store to purchase equipment, combat, traps to solve, and a dungeon to explore. Other contemporaneous CRPGs (Computer Role Playing Games) were Temple of Apshai, Odyssey: The Compleat Apventure and Akalabeth: World of Doom, the precursor to Ultima. Some early microcomputer RPGs (such as Telengard (1982) or Sword of Fargoal) were based on their mainframe counterparts, while others (such as Ultima or Wizardry, the most successful of the early CRPGs) were loose adaptations of D&D. They also include both first-person displays and overhead views, sometimes in the same game (Akalabeth, for example, uses both perspectives). Most of the key features of RPGs were developed in this early period, prior to the release of Ultima III: Exodus, one of the prime influences on both computer and console RPG development. For example, Wizardry features menu-driven combat, Tunnels of Doom features tactical combat on a special "combat screen", and Dungeons of Daggorath features real-time combat which takes place on the main dungeon map.

Starting in 1984 with Questron and 50 Mission Crush, SSI produced many series of CRPGs. Their 1985 game Phantasie is notable for introducing automapping and in-game scrolls providing hints and background information. They also released Pool of Radiance in 1988, the first of several "Gold Box" CRPGs based on the Advanced Dungeons & Dragons rules. These games feature a first-person display for movement, combined with an overhead tactical display for combat. One common feature of RPGs from this era, which Matt Barton calls the "Golden Age" of computer RPGs, is the use of numbered "paragraphs" printed in the manual or adjunct booklets, containing the game's lengthier texts; the player can be directed to read a certain paragraph, instead of being shown the text on screen. The ultimate exemplar of this approach is Sir-Tech's Star Saga trilogy (of which only two games were released); the first game contains 888 "textlets" (usually much longer than a single paragraph) spread across 13 booklets, while the second contains 50,000 paragraphs spread across 14 booklets. Most of the games from this era are turn-based, although Dungeon Master and its imitators have real-time combat. Other classic titles from this era include The Bard's Tale (1985), Wasteland (1988), the start of the Might and Magic (1986 – 2014) series and the continuing Ultima (1981 – 1999) series.

Later, in the middle to late 1990s, isometric, sprite-based RPGs became commonplace, with video game publishers Interplay Entertainment and Blizzard North playing a lead role with such titles as the Baldur's Gate, Icewind Dale and the action-RPG Diablo series, as well as the dialogue-heavy Planescape: Torment and cult classics Fallout and Fallout 2. This era also saw a move toward 3D game engines with such games as Might and Magic VI: The Mandate of Heaven and The Elder Scrolls: Arena. TSR, dissatisfied with SSI's later products, such as Dark Sun: Wake of the Ravager and Menzoberranzan, transferred the AD&D license to several different developers, and eventually gave it to BioWare, who used it in Baldur's Gate (1998) and several later games. By the 2000s, 3D engines had become dominant.

=== Video game consoles ===
The earliest RPG on a console was Dragonstomper on the Atari 2600 in 1982. Another early RPG on a console was Bokosuka Wars, originally released for the Sharp X1 computer in 1983 and later ported to the MSX in 1984, the Nintendo Entertainment System in 1985 and the X68000 as New Bokosuka Wars. The game laid the foundations for the tactical role-playing game genre, or "simulation RPG" genre as it is known in Japan. It was also an early example of a real-time, action role-playing game. In 1986, Chunsoft created the NES title Dragon Quest (called Dragon Warrior in North America until the eighth game), which drew inspiration from computer RPGs Ultima and Wizardry and is regarded as the template for future Japanese role-playing video games released since then.

In 1987, the genre came into its own with the release of several highly influential console RPGs distinguishing themselves from computer RPGs, including the genre-defining Phantasy Star, released for the Master System. Shigeru Miyamoto's Zelda II: The Adventure of Link for the Famicom Disk System was one of the earliest action role-playing games, combining the action-adventure game framework of its predecessor The Legend of Zelda with the statistical elements of turn-based RPGs. Most RPGs at this time were turn-based. Faxanadu was another early action RPG for the NES, released as a side-story to the computer action RPG Dragon Slayer II: Xanadu. Square's Final Fantasy for the NES introduced side-view battles, with the player characters on the right and the enemies on the left, which soon became the norm for numerous console RPGs. In 1988, Dragon Warrior III introduced a character progression system allowing the player to change the party's character classes during the course of the game. Another "major innovation was the introduction of day/night cycles; certain items, characters, and quests are only accessible at certain times of day." In 1989, Phantasy Star II for the Genesis established many conventions of the genre, including an epic, dramatic, character-driven storyline dealing with serious themes and subject matter.

Console RPGs distinguished themselves from computer RPGs to a greater degree in the early 1990s. As console RPGs became more heavily story-based than their computer counterparts, one of the major differences that emerged during this time was in the portrayal of the characters. Console RPGs often featured intricately related characters who had distinctive personalities and traits, with players assuming the roles of people who cared about each other, fell in love or even had families. Romance in particular was a theme that was common in most console RPGs at the time but absent from most computer RPGs. During the 1990s, console RPGs had become increasingly dominant, exerting a greater influence on computer RPGs than the other way around. Console RPGs had eclipsed computer RPGs for some time, though computer RPGs began making a comeback towards the end of the decade with interactive choice-filled adventures.

The next major revolution came in the late 1990s, which saw the rise of optical disks in fifth generation consoles. The implications for RPGs were enormous—longer, more involved quests, better audio, and full-motion video. This was first clearly demonstrated in 1997 by the phenomenal success of Final Fantasy VII, which is considered one of the most influential games of all time. With a record-breaking production budget of around $45 million, the ambitious scope of Final Fantasy VII raised the possibilities for the genre, with its dozens of minigames and much higher production values. The latter includes innovations such as the use of 3D characters on pre-rendered backgrounds, battles viewed from multiple different angles rather than a single angle, and for the first time full-motion CGI video seamlessly blended into the gameplay, effectively integrated throughout the game. The game was soon ported to the PC and gained much success there, as did several other originally console RPGs, blurring the line between the console and computer platforms.

=== Cultural differences ===
Computer-driven role-playing games had their start in Western markets, with games generally geared to be played on home computers. By 1985, series like Wizardry and Ultima represented the state of the art in role-playing games. In Japan, home computers had yet to take as great a hold as they had in the West due to their cost; there was little market for Western-developed games and there were a few Japanese-developed games for personal computers during this time such as The Black Onyx (1984) which followed the Wizardry/Ultima format. With the release of the low-cost Famicom console (called the Nintendo Entertainment System overseas), a new opportunity arose to bring role-playing games to Japan. Dragon Quest (1986) was the first such attempt to recreate a role-playing game for a console, and requires several simplifications to fit within the more limited memory and capabilities of the Famicom compared to computers; players in Dragon Quest controlled only a single character, the amount of control over this character limited due to the simplicity of the Famicom controller, and a less-realistic art style was chosen to better visualize the characters within a tile-based graphics system. Dragon Quest was highly successful in Japan, leading to further entries in the series and other titles such as Final Fantasy that followed the same simplifications made in RPGs for Dragon Quest. Because of these differences, the role-playing genre began to be classified into two fairly distinct styles: computer RPG and console RPG. (Note: The original Dragon Quest game is often cited as the first true role-playing video game for consoles. Further, despite being released later, Western audiences often consider Final Fantasy "more important" than Dragon Quest as it was more commercially successful in those markets.)

By the early 2000s, the distinction between platforms became less pronounced as the same games appeared on both console and computer, but stylistic differences between Western role-playing games (WRPGs) and Japanese role-playing games (JRPGs) remained, rooted in the earlier distinctions. Though sharing fundamental premises, WRPGs tend to feature darker graphics, older characters, and a greater focus on roaming freedom, realism, and the underlying game mechanics (e.g. "rules-based" or "system-based"); whereas JRPGs tend to feature brighter, anime-like or chibi graphics, younger characters, turn-based or faster-paced action gameplay, and a greater focus on tightly orchestrated, linear storylines with intricate plots (e.g. "action-based" or "story-based"). Further, WRPGs are more likely to allow players to create and customize characters from scratch, and since the late 1990s have had a stronger focus on extensive dialog tree systems (e.g. Planescape: Torment). On the other hand, JRPGs tend to limit players to developing pre-defined player characters, and often do not allow the option to create or choose one's own playable characters or make decisions that alter the plot. (Note: This often gives an impression that JRPGs are similar to adventure games.) In the early 1990s, JRPGs were seen as being much closer to fantasy novels, but by the late 1990s had become more cinematic in style (e.g. Final Fantasy series). At the same time, WRPGs started becoming more novelistic in style (e.g. Planescape: Torment), but by the late 2000s had also adopted a more cinematic style (e.g. Mass Effect).

One reason given for these differences is that many early Japanese console RPGs can be seen as forms of interactive manga or anime wrapped around Western rule systems at the time, in addition to the influence of visual novel adventure games. As a result, Japanese console RPGs differentiated themselves with a stronger focus on scripted narratives and character drama, alongside streamlined gameplay. In recent years, these trends have in turn been adopted by WRPGs, which have begun moving more towards tightly structured narratives, in addition to moving away from "numbers and rules" in favor of streamlined combat systems similar to action games. In addition, a large number of Western indie games are modelled after JRPGs, especially those of the 16-bit era, partly due to the RPG Maker game development tools.

Another oft-cited difference is the prominence or absence of kawaisa, or "cuteness", in Japanese culture, and different approaches with respect to character aesthetics. WRPGs tend to maintain a serious and gritty tone, whereas JRPG protagonists tend to be designed with an emphasis on youth or aesthetic beauty, and even male characters are often young, androgynous, shōnen or bishōnen in appearance. JRPGs often have cute characters, juxtaposed with more mature themes and situations; and many modern JRPGs feature characters designed in the same style as those in manga and anime. The stylistic differences are often due to differing target audiences: Western RPGs are usually geared primarily towards teenage to adult males, whereas Japanese RPGs are usually intended for a much larger demographic, including female audiences, who, for example, accounted for nearly a third of Final Fantasy XIII's playerbase. In 2015, IGN noted in an interview with Xenoblade Chronicles X's development team that the label "JRPG" is most commonly used to refer to RPGs "whose presentation mimics the design sensibilities" of anime and manga, that it's "typically the presentation and character archetypes" that signal "this is a JRPG."

Modern JRPGs are more likely to feature turn-based battles; while modern WRPGs are more likely to feature real-time combat. In the past, the reverse was often true: real-time action role-playing games were far more common among Japanese console RPGs than Western computer RPGs up until the late 1990s, due to gamepads usually being better suited to real-time action than the keyboard and mouse.

Some journalists and video game designers have questioned this cultural classification, arguing that the differences between Eastern and Western games have been exaggerated. In an interview held at the American Electronic Entertainment Expo, Japanese video game developer Tetsuya Nomura (who worked on Final Fantasy and Kingdom Hearts) emphasized that RPGs should not be classified by country-of-origin, but rather described simply for what they are: role-playing games. Hironobu Sakaguchi, creator of Final Fantasy and The Last Story, noted that, while "users like to categorise" JRPGs as "turn-based, traditional styles" and WRPGs as "born from first-person shooters," there "are titles that don't fit the category," pointing to Chrono Trigger (which he also worked on) and the Mana games. He further noted that there have been "other games similar to the style of Chrono Trigger," but that "it's probably because the games weren't localised and didn't reach the Western audience." Xeno series director Tetsuya Takahashi, in reference to Xenoblade Chronicles, stated that "I don't know when exactly people started using the term 'JRPG,' but if this game makes people rethink the meaning of this term, I'll be satisfied." The writer Jeremy Parish of 1UP.com states that "Xenoblade throws into high relief the sheer artificiality of the gaming community's obsession over the differences between" Western and Japanese RPGs, pointing out that it "does things that don't really fit into either genre. Gamers do love their boundaries and barriers and neat little rules, I know, but just because you cram something into a little box doesn't mean it belongs there." Nick Doerr of Joystiq criticizes the claim that JRPGs are "too linear", pointing out that non-linear JRPGs are not uncommon—for instance, the Romancing SaGa series. Likewise, Rowan Kaiser of Joystiq points out that linear WRPGs were common in the 1990s, and argues that many of the often mentioned differences between Eastern and Western games are stereotypes that are generally "not true" and "never was", pointing to classic examples like Lands of Lore and Betrayal at Krondor that were more narrative-focused than the typical Western-style RPGs of the time.

==== Criticisms ====
Due to the cultural differences between Western and Japanese variations of role-playing games, both have often been compared and critiqued by those within the video games industry and the press.

In the late 1980s, when traditional American computer RPGs such as Ultima and Defender of the Crown were ported to consoles, they received mixed reviews from console gamers, as they were "not perceived, by many of the players, to be as exciting as the Japanese imports", and lacked the arcade and action-adventure elements commonly found in Japanese console RPGs at the time. In the early 1990s, American computer RPGs also began facing criticism for their plots, where "the party sticks together through thick and thin" and always "act together as a group" rather than as individuals, and where non-player characters are "one-dimensional characters", in comparison to the more fantasy novel approach of SquareSoft console RPGs such as Final Fantasy IV. However, in 1994, game designer Sandy Petersen noted that, among computer gamers, there was criticism against cartridge-based console JRPGs being "not role-playing at all" due to popular examples such as Secret of Mana and especially The Legend of Zelda using "direct" arcade-style action combat systems instead of the more "abstract" turn-based battle systems associated with computer RPGs. In response, he pointed out that not all console RPGs are action-based, pointing to Final Fantasy and Lufia. Another early criticism, dating back to the Phantasy Star games in the late 1980s, was the frequent use of defined player characters, in contrast to the Wizardry and Gold Box games where the player's avatars (such as knights, clerics, or thieves) were blank slates.

As Japanese console RPGs became increasingly more dominant in the 1990s, and became known for being more heavily story and character-based, American computer RPGs began to face criticism for having characters devoid of personality or background, due to representing avatars which the player uses to interact with the world, in contrast to Japanese console RPGs which depicted characters with distinctive personalities. American computer RPGs were thus criticized for lacking "more of the traditional role-playing" offered by Japanese console RPGs, which instead emphasized character interactions. In response, North American computer RPGs began making a comeback towards the end of the 1990s with interactive choice-filled adventures.

Several writers have criticized JRPGs as not being "true" RPGs, for heavy usage of scripted cutscenes and dialogue, and a frequent lack of branching outcomes.^{[Turner]} Japanese RPGs are also sometimes criticized for having relatively simple battle systems in which players are able to win by repetitively mashing buttons.^{[Turner]} (Note: Though some argue this has not been the case outside of tactical RPGs, while others argue that combat systems in JRPGs are too complex or lack accessibility.) As a result, Japanese-style role-playing games are held in disdain by some Western gamers, leading to the term "JRPG" being held in the pejorative. Some observers have also speculated that JRPGs are stagnating or declining in both quality and popularity, including remarks by BioWare co-founder Greg Zeschuk and writing director Daniel Erickson that JRPGs are stagnating—and that Final Fantasy XIII is not even really an RPG; criticisms regarding seemingly nebulous justifications by some Japanese designers for newly changed (or, alternately, newly un-changed) features of recent titles; calls among some gaming journalists to "fix" JRPGs' problems; as well as claims that some recent titles such as Front Mission Evolved are beginning to attempt—and failing to—imitate Western titles. In an article for PSM3, Brittany Vincent of RPGFan.com felt that "developers have mired the modern JRPG in unoriginality", citing Square Enix CEO Yoichi Wada who stated that "they're strictly catering to a particular audience", the article noting the difference in game sales between Japan and North America before going on to suggest JRPGs may need to "move forward". This criticism has also occurred in the wider media with an advertisement for Fallout: New Vegas (Obsidian Entertainment) in Japan openly mocked Japanese RPGs' traditional characteristics in favor of their own title. Nick Doerr of Joystiq noted that Bethesda felt that JRPGs "are all the same" and "too linear", to which he responded that "[f]or the most part, it's true" but noted there are also non-linear JRPGs such as the Romancing SaGa series. Such criticisms have produced responses such as ones by Japanese video game developers, Shinji Mikami and Yuji Horii, to the effect that JRPGs were never as popular in the West to begin with, and that Western reviewers are biased against turn-based systems. Jeff Fleming of Gamasutra also states that Japanese RPGs on home consoles are generally showing signs of staleness, but notes that handheld consoles such as the Nintendo DS have had more original and experimental Japanese RPGs released in recent years.

Western RPGs have also received criticism in recent years. They remain less popular in Japan, where, until recently, Western games in general had a negative reputation. In Japan, where the vast majority of early console role-playing video games originate, Western RPGs remain largely unknown. The developer Motomu Toriyama criticized Western RPGs, stating that they "dump you in a big open world, and let you do whatever you like [which makes it] difficult to tell a compelling story." Hironobu Sakaguchi noted that "users like to categorise" WRPGs as "a sort of different style, born from first person shooters." In recent years, some have also criticized WRPGs for becoming less RPG-like, instead with further emphasis on action. Christian Nutt of GameSpy states that, in contrast to JRPGs, WRPGs' greater control over the development and customization of playable characters has come at the expense of plot and gameplay, resulting in what he felt was generic dialogue, lack of character development within the narrative and weaker battle systems.^{[Nutt]} He also states that WRPGs tend to focus more on the underlying rules governing the battle system rather than on the experience itself.^{[Nutt]} Tom Battey of Edge Magazine noted that the problems often cited against JRPGs also often apply to many WRPGs as well as games outside of the RPG genre. BioWare games have been criticized for "lack of innovation, repetitive structure and lack of real choice." WRPGs, such as Bethesda games, have also been criticized for lacking in "narrative strength" or "mechanical intricacy" due to the open-ended, sandbox structure of their games.

Despite the criticisms leveled at both variations, Rowan Kaiser of Joystiq argued that many of the often mentioned differences between Eastern and Western games are stereotypes that are generally not true, noting various similarities between several Western titles (such as Lands of Lore, Betrayal at Krondor, and Dragon Age) and several classic Eastern titles (such as Final Fantasy and Phantasy Star), noting that both these Western and Japanese titles share a similar emphasis on linear storytelling, pre-defined characters and "bright-colored" graphics. The developer Hironobu Sakaguchi also noted there are many games from both that don't fit such categorizations, such as his own Chrono Trigger as well as the Mana games, noting there have been many other such Japanese role-playing games that never released in Western markets.

==== Controversy ====
Christianity is a minority religion in Japan and depictions of Christian symbolism and themes in Japanese media are fraught with potential controversy. This tends to be problematic when JRPGs are exported to Western countries such as the United States where the topics of religion and blasphemy remain sensitive. A JRPG can exhibit elements that would be controversial in the West, such as Xenogears or Final Fantasy Tactics featuring antagonists that bear similarities to the Abrahamic God and the Catholic Church, respectively; negative depictions of organized religions; and "characters banding together and killing God." Nintendo has made efforts in the past to remove references such as these prior to introducing their games into the North American market.

== Subgenres ==
=== Action RPGs ===
Video showing typical gameplay of an isometric point-and-click action RPG

Typically action RPGs feature each player directly controlling a single character in real-time, and feature a strong focus on combat and action with plot and character interaction kept to a minimum. Early action RPGs tended to follow the template set by 1980s Nihon Falcom titles such as the Dragon Slayer and Ys series, which feature hack and slash combat where the player character's movements and actions are controlled directly, using a keyboard or game controller, rather than using menus. This formula was refined by the action-adventure game, The Legend of Zelda (1986), which set the template used by many subsequent action RPGs, including innovations such as an open world, nonlinear gameplay, battery backup saving, and an attack button that animates a sword swing or projectile attack on the screen. The game was largely responsible for the surge of action-oriented RPGs released since the late 1980s, both in Japan and North America. The Legend of Zelda series would continue to exert an influence on the transition of both console and computer RPGs from stat-heavy, turn-based combat towards real-time action combat in the following decades.

A different variation of the action RPG formula was popularized by Diablo (1996), where the majority of commands—such as moving and attacking—are executed using mouse clicks rather than via menus, though learned spells can also be assigned to hotkeys. In many action RPGs, non-player characters serve only one purpose, be it to buy or sell items or upgrade the player's abilities, or issue them with combat-centric quests. Problems players face also often have an action-based solution, such as breaking a wooden door open with an axe rather than finding the key needed to unlock it, though some games place greater emphasis on character attributes such as a "lockpicking" skill and puzzle-solving.

One common challenge in developing action RPGs is including content beyond that of killing enemies. With the sheer number of items, locations and monsters found in many such games, it can be difficult to create the needed depth to offer players a unique experience tailored to his or her beliefs, choices or actions. This is doubly true if a game makes use of randomization, as is common. One notable example of a game which went beyond this is Deus Ex (2000) which offered multiple solutions to problems using intricately layered story options and individually constructed environments. Instead of simply bashing their way through levels, players were challenged to act in character by choosing dialog options appropriately, and by using the surrounding environment intelligently. This produced an experience that was unique and tailored to each situation as opposed to one that repeated itself endlessly.

At one time, action RPGs were much more common on consoles than on computers. Though there had been attempts at creating action-oriented computer RPGs during the late 1980s and early 1990s, often in the vein of Zelda, very few saw any success, with the 1992 game Ultima VII being one of the more successful exceptions in North America. On the PC, Diablo's effect on the market was significant: it had many imitators and its style of combat went on to be used by many games that came after. For many years afterwards, games that closely mimicked the Diablo formula were referred to as "Diablo clones". Three of the four titles in the series were still sold together as part of the Diablo Battle Chest over a decade after Diablo's release. Other examples of action RPGs for the PC include Dungeon Siege, Sacred, Torchlight and Hellgate: London—the last of which was developed by a team headed by former Blizzard employees, some of whom had participated in the creation of the Diablo series. Like Diablo and Rogue before it, Torchlight and Hellgate: London made use of procedural generation to generate game levels.

Also included within this subgenre are role-playing shooters—games that incorporate elements of role-playing games and shooter games (including first-person and third-person). Recent examples include the Mass Effect series, Fallout: New Vegas, Borderlands 2 and The 3rd Birthday.

=== Dungeon crawlers ===
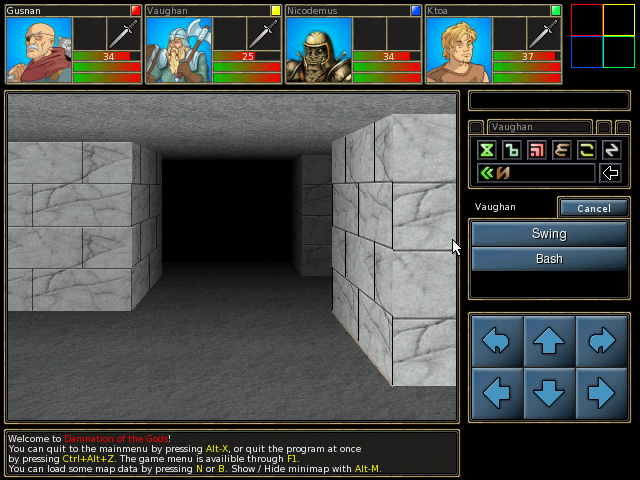
Screenshot of Damnation of Gods, a Dungeon Master clone. All four members of the players' party move around the game world as a single unit, or "blob", in first-person perspective.

This subgenre consists of RPGs where the player leads a party of adventurers in first-person perspective, typically through a dungeon or labyrinth in a grid-based environment. Examples include the aforementioned Wizardry, Might and Magic and Bard's Tale series; as well as the Etrian Odyssey and Elminage series. Games of this type are sometimes called "blobbers", since the player moves the entire party around the playing field as a single unit, or "blob".

Most "blobbers" are turn-based, but some titles such as the Dungeon Master, Legend of Grimrock and Eye of the Beholder series are played in real-time. Early games in this genre lacked an automap feature, forcing players to draw their own maps in order to keep track of their progress. Environmental and spatial puzzles are common, meaning players may need to, for instance, move a stone in one part of the level in order to open a gate in another part of the level.

=== MMORPGs ===
Though many of the original RPGs for the PLATO mainframe system in the late 1970s also supported multiple, simultaneous players, the popularity of multiplayer modes in mainstream RPGs did not begin to rise sharply until the early to mid-1990s. For instance, Secret of Mana (1993), an early action role-playing game by Square, was one of the first commercial RPGs to feature cooperative multiplayer gameplay, offering two-player and three-player action once the main character had acquired his party members. Later, Diablo (1997) would combine CRPG and action game elements with an Internet multiplayer mode that allowed up to four players to enter the same world and fight monsters, trade items, or fight against each other.

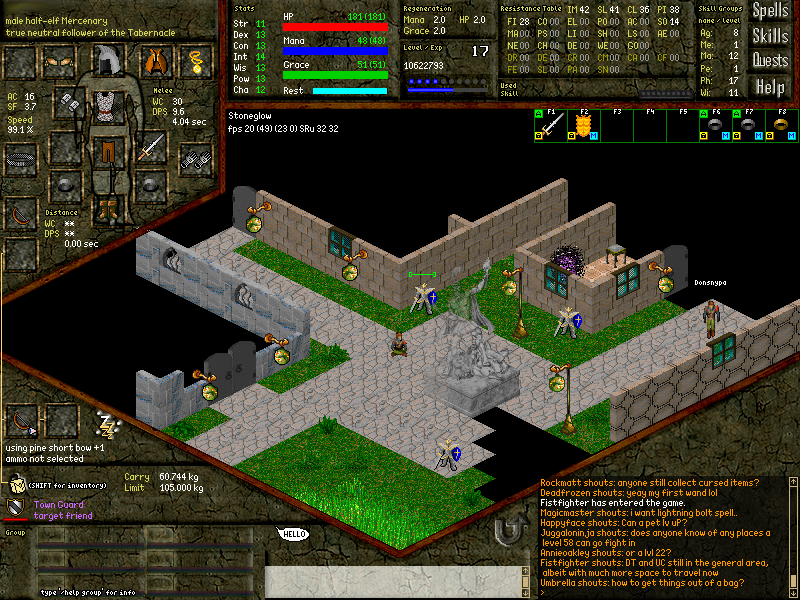
Multiple people chat and play online in the MMORPG Daimonin.

Also during this time period, the MUD genre that had been spawned by MUD1 in 1978 was undergoing a tremendous expansion phase due to the release and spread of LPMud (1989) and DikuMUD (1991). Soon, driven by the mainstream adoption of the Internet, these parallel trends merged in the popularization of graphical MUDs, which would soon become known as massively multiplayer online role-playing games or MMORPGs, beginning with games like Meridian 59 (1995), Nexus: The Kingdom of the Winds (1996), Ultima Online (1997), Lineage (1998), and EverQuest (1999), and leading to more modern phenomena such as RuneScape (2001), Ragnarok Online(2002), Final Fantasy XI (2003), Eve Online (2003) Disney's Toontown Online (2003) and World of Warcraft (2004).

Although superficially similar to single-player RPGs, MMORPGs lend their appeal more to the socializing influences of being online with hundreds or even thousands of other players at a time, and trace their origins more from MUDs than from CRPGs like Ultima and Wizardry. Rather than focusing on the "old school" considerations of memorizing huge numbers of stats and esoterica and battling it out in complex, tactical environments, players instead spend much of their time forming and maintaining guilds and clans. The distinction between CRPGs and MMORPGs and MUDs can as a result be very sharp, likenable to the difference between "attending a renaissance fair and reading a good fantasy novel".

Single-player games are great, and I love them. They have a great feature. Your life is very special. You are the hero and you get to save the whole world. (...) [Tabula Rasa] is like Disney World... You can go to shops and get food, but when you get on the boat for the pirate ride, you're in your own version of reality. Once the ride starts, you are blissfully unaware of the boats in front of you and behind you.

— Richard Garriott, regarding the use of instancing in Tabula Rasa (2007)

Further, MMORPGs have been criticized for diluting the "epic" feeling of single-player RPGs and related media among thousands of concurrent adventurers. Stated simply: every player wants to be "The Hero", slay "The Monster", rescue "The Princess", or obtain "The Magic Sword". But when there are thousands of players all playing the same game, clearly not everyone can be the hero. This problem became obvious to some in the game EverQuest, where groups of players would compete and sometimes harass each other in order to get monsters in the same dungeon to drop valuable items, leading to several undesirable behaviors such as kill stealing, spawn camping, and ninja looting. In response—for instance by Richard Garriott in Tabula Rasa (2007)—developers began turning to instance dungeons as a means of reducing competition over limited resources, as well as preserving the gaming experience—though this mechanic has its own set of detractors.

Lastly, there exist markets such as Korea and China that, while saturated with MMORPGs, have so far proved relatively unreceptive to single-player RPGs. For instance, Internet-connected personal computers are relatively common in Korea when compared to other regions—particularly in the numerous "PC bangs" scattered around the country, where patrons are able to pay to play multiplayer video games—possibly due to historical bans on Japanese imports, as well as a culture that traditionally sees video games as "frivolous toys" and computers as educational. As a result, some have wondered whether the stand-alone, single-player RPG is still viable commercially—especially on the personal computer—when there are competing pressures such as big-name publishers' marketing needs, video game piracy, a change in culture, and the competitive price-point-to-processing-power ratio (at least initially) of modern console systems. (Note: Though things like downloadable content can stem piracy to some degree, and MMO and single-player RPGs may to some degree attract different audiences—and thus not interfere with each other financially.)

=== Monster-taming ===
A monster-taming game (also known as a monster-catching game) is a subgenre of role-playing games that most notably includes the Pokémon franchise. While Pokémon is the most recognizable example of such a game to Western audiences, the origins of the genre were in the Megami Tensei series, which involved fighting, negotiating with, and recruiting demons and other mythological beings.

=== Roguelikes and roguelites ===
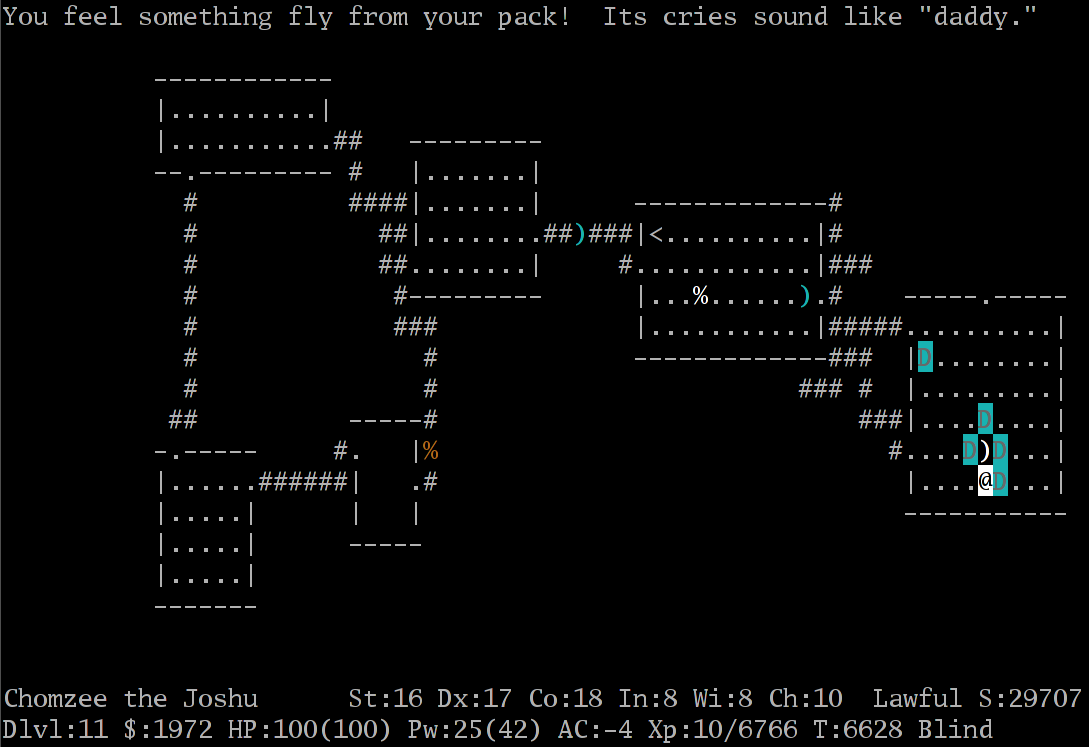
NetHack and other roguelikes often use ASCII text characters to represent objects in the game world. The position of the main character in this image is indicated by the symbol @.

Roguelike is a subgenre of role-playing video games, characterized by procedural generation of game levels, turn-based gameplay, tile-based graphics, permanent death of the player-character, and typically based on a high fantasy narrative setting. Roguelikes descend from the 1980 game Rogue, particularly mirroring Rogue's character- or sprite-based graphics. These games were popularized among college students and computer programmers of the 1980s and 1990s, leading to a large number of variants but adhering to these common gameplay elements. Some of the more well-known variants include Hack, NetHack, Ancient Domains of Mystery, Moria, Angband, and Tales of Maj'Eyal. The Japanese series of Mystery Dungeon games by Chunsoft, inspired by Rogue, also fall within the concept of roguelike games.

More recently, with more powerful home computers and gaming systems, new variations of roguelikes incorporating other gameplay genres, thematic elements and graphical styles have become popular, typically retaining the notion of procedural generation. These titles are sometimes labeled as "roguelike-like", "rogue-lite", or "procedural death labyrinths" to reflect the variation from titles which mimic the gameplay of traditional roguelikes more faithfully. Other games, like Diablo and UnReal World, took inspiration from roguelikes.

=== Sandbox RPGs ===
Sandbox RPGs, or open world RPGs, allow the player a great amount of freedom and usually feature a more open free-roaming world (meaning the player is not confined to a single path restricted by rocks or fences etc.). Sandbox RPGs possess similarities to other sandbox games, such as the Grand Theft Auto series, with a large number of interactable NPCs, large amount of content and typically some of the largest worlds to explore and longest play-times of all RPGs due to an impressive amount of secondary content not critical to the game's main storyline. Sandbox RPGs often attempt to emulate an entire region of their setting. Popular examples of this subgenre include the Dragon Slayer series by Nihon Falcom, the early Dragon Quest games by Chunsoft, The Legend of Zelda and Pokémon Scarlet and Violet by Nintendo, Wasteland by Interplay Entertainment, the SaGa and Mana series by SquareSoft, System Shock and System Shock 2 by Looking Glass Studios and Irrational Games, Deus Ex by Ion Storm, The Elder Scrolls and Fallout series by Bethesda Softworks and Interplay Entertainment, Fable by Lionhead Studios and Playground Games, the Gothic series by Piranha Bytes, the Xenoblade series by Monolith Soft, and the Dark Souls series by FromSoftware.

=== Tactical RPGs ===
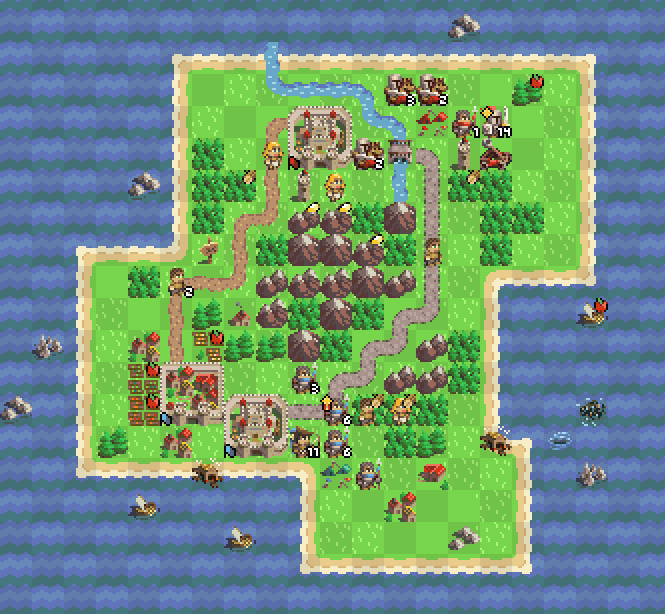
Tactical role-playing games often involve moving troops turn by turn across a map to defeat foes or capture territory, as depicted similarly in this illustration.

This subgenre of turn-based role-playing games principally refers to games which incorporate elements from strategy games as an alternative to traditional role-playing game (RPG) systems. Tactical RPGs are descendants of traditional strategy games, such as chess, and table-top role-playing and strategic war games, such as Chainmail, which were mainly tactical in their original form. The format of a tactical CRPG is also like a traditional RPG in its appearance, pacing and rule structure. Like standard RPGs, the player controls a finite party and battles a similar number of enemies. And like other RPGs, death is usually temporary, albeit some have permanent death of party members. But this genre incorporates strategic gameplay such as tactical movement on an isometric grid. Tactical RPGs tend not to feature multiplayer play.

A number of early Western role-playing video games used a highly tactical form of combat, including parts of the Ultima series, which introduced party-based, tiled combat in Ultima III: Exodus (1983). Ultima III would go on to be ported to many other platforms and influence the development of later titles, as would Bokosuka Wars (1983), considered a pioneer in the strategy/simulation RPG genre, according to Nintendo. Conventionally, however, the term tactical RPG (known as simulation RPG in Japan) refers to the distinct subgenre that was born in Japan; as the early origins of tactical RPGs are difficult to trace from the American side of the Pacific, where much of the early RPG genre developed.

Many tactical RPGs can be both extremely time-consuming and extremely difficult. Hence, the appeal of most tactical RPGs is to the hardcore, not casual, computer and video game player. Traditionally, tactical RPGs have been quite popular in Japan but have not enjoyed the same degree of success in North America and elsewhere. However, the audience for Japanese tactical RPGs has grown substantially since the mid-90s, with PS1 and PS2 titles such as Final Fantasy Tactics, Suikoden Tactics, Vanguard Bandits, and Disgaea enjoying a surprising measure of popularity, as well as hand-held war games like Fire Emblem. (Final Fantasy Tactics for the PS1 is often considered the breakthrough title outside Japan.) Older TRPGs are also being re-released via software emulation—such as on the Wii Virtual Console—and on handheld game consoles, giving games a new lease on life and exposure to new audiences. Japanese video games such as these are as a result no longer nearly as rare a commodity in North America as they were during the 1990s.

Western video games have utilized similar mechanics for years, as well, and were largely defined by X-COM: UFO Defense (1994) in much the same way as Eastern video games were by Fire Emblem. Titles such as X-COM have generally allowed greater freedom of movement when interacting with the surrounding environment than their Eastern counterparts. Other similar examples include the Jagged Alliance (1994 – 2013) and Silent Storm (2003 – 2005) series. According to a few developers, it became increasingly difficult during the 2000s to develop games of this type for the PC in the West (though several had been developed in Eastern Europe with mixed results); and even some Japanese console RPG developers began to complain about a bias against turn-based systems. Reasons cited include Western publishers' focus on developing real-time and action-oriented games instead.

Lastly, there are a number of "full-fledged" CRPGs which could be described as having "tactical combat". Examples from the classic era of CRPGs include parts of the aforementioned Ultima series; SSI's Wizard's Crown (1985) and The Eternal Dagger (1987); the Gold Box games of the late '80s and early '90s, many of which were later ported to Japanese video game systems; and the Realms of Arkania (1992 – 1996) series based on the German The Dark Eye pen-and-paper system. More recent examples include Wasteland 2, Shadowrun: Dragonfall and Divinity: Original Sin—all released in 2014. Partly due to the release of these games 2014 has been called "the first year of the CRPG renaissance".

=== Turn-based RPGs ===
Turn-based RPGs have actions take place in a sequence which can be determined by various factors. Unlike other genres, actions by others characters cannot be performed unless it is their turn to perform them. This can be limited to just battles in games or even movement around the overworld depending on the game mechanic or subgenre. This genre started off on PC with series like Ultima and then become very popular on console with releases like Dragon Quest. Turn-based RPGs may have been considered outdated, but in 2026, the success of Baldur's Gate 3 and Clair Obscur: Expedition 33 seems to have brought about a resurgence of the genre.

=== Hybrid genres ===
A steadily increasing number of other non-RP video games have adopted aspects traditionally seen in RPGs, such as experience point systems, equipment management, and choices in dialogue, as developers push to fill the demand for role-playing elements in non-RPGs. The blending of these elements with a number of different game engines and gameplay styles have created a myriad of hybrid game categories formed by mixing popular gameplay elements featured in other genres such as first-person shooters, platformers, and turn-based and real-time strategy games. Examples include first-person shooters such as parts of the Deus Ex (starting in 2000) and S.T.A.L.K.E.R. (starting in 2007) series; real-time strategy games such as SpellForce: The Order of Dawn (2003) and Warhammer 40,000: Dawn of War II (2009); puzzle video games such as Castlevania Puzzle (2010) and Puzzle Quest: Challenge of the Warlords (2007); and turn-based strategy games like the Steel Panthers (1995 – 2006) series, which combined tactical military combat with RPG-derived unit advancement. As a group, hybrid games have been both praised and criticized; being referred to by one critic as the "poor man's" RPG for omitting the dialogue choices and story-driven character development of major AAA titles; and by another critic as "promising" for shedding the conventions of more established franchises in an attempt to innovate.

=== Relationship to other genres ===
RPGs seldom test a player's physical skill. Combat is typically a tactical challenge rather than a physical one, and games involve other non-action gameplay such as choosing dialog options, inventory management, or buying and selling items.

Although RPGs share some combat rules with wargames, RPGs are often about a small group of individual characters. Wargames tend to have large groups of identical units, as well as non-humanoid units such as tanks and airplanes. Role-playing games do not normally allow the player to produce more units. However, the Heroes of Might and Magic series crosses these genres by combining individual heroes with large numbers of troops in large battles.

RPGs rival adventure games in terms of their rich storylines, in contrast to genres that do not rely upon storytelling such as sports games or puzzle games. Both genres also feature highly detailed characters, and a great deal of exploration. However, RPGs also feature a combat system, which adventure games lack. In doing so, RPGs tend to emphasize complex internal mechanics where characters are defined by increasing numerical attributes.

Gameplay elements strongly associated with this genre, such as statistical character development, have been widely adapted to other video game genres. For example, Grand Theft Auto: San Andreas, an action-adventure game, uses resource statistics (abbreviated as "stats") to define a wide range of attributes including stamina, weapon proficiency, driving, lung capacity, and muscle tone, and uses numerous cutscenes and quests to advance the story.

Warcraft III: Reign of Chaos, a real-time strategy game, features heroes that can complete quests, obtain new equipment, and "learn" new abilities as they advance in level. A community-created mod based on Warcraft III, Defense of the Ancients (DotA), served as significant inspiration for the multiplayer online battle arena (MOBA) genre. Due to its Warcraft III origins, MOBA is a fusion of role-playing games, real-time strategy games, and action games, with RPG elements built in its core gameplay. A key features, such as control over one character in a party, growth in power over the course of match, learning new thematic abilities, using of mana, leveling and accumulation of experience points, equipment and inventory management, completing quests, and fighting with the stationary boss monsters, have resemblance with role-playing games.

According to Satoru Iwata, former president of Nintendo, turn-based RPGs have been unfairly criticized as being outdated, and action-based RPGs can frustrate players who are unable to keep up with the battles. According to Yuji Horii, creator of the popular Dragon Quest series and Ryutaro Ichimura, producer of Square Enix, turn-based RPGs allow the player time to make decisions without feeling rushed or worry about real-life distractions.

== Popularity ==
The best-selling RPG series worldwide is Pokémon, which has sold over 300 million units, with over 30 million sales for Pokémon Red, Blue, and Green alone. The second and third best-selling RPG franchises worldwide are Square Enix's Final Fantasy and Dragon Quest series, with over 110 million units and over 64 million units sold as of March 31, 2014, respectively. Nearly all the games in the main Final Fantasy series and all the games in the main Dragon Quest series (as well as many of the spin-off games) have sold over a million copies each, with some games selling more than four million copies. Square Enix's best-selling title is Final Fantasy VII, which has sold over 10 million copies worldwide as of 2010.

Among the best-selling PC RPGs overall is the massively multiplayer online game World of Warcraft with 11.5 million subscribers as of May 2010. Among single player PC RPGs, Diablo II has sold the largest amount, with the most recently cited number being over 4 million copies as of 2001. However, copies of the Diablo: Battle Chest continued to be sold in retail stores, with the compilation appearing on the NPD Group's top 10 PC games sales, list as recently as 2010. Further, Diablo: Battle Chest was the 19th best-selling PC game of 2008—a full seven years after the game's initial release; and 11 million users still played Diablo II and StarCraft over Battle.net in 2010. As a franchise, the Diablo series has sold over 20 million copies, not including Diablo III which was released for Windows and OS X in 2012. (Note: Diablo III was also released for PlayStation 3 and Xbox 360 on September 3, 2013, as well as the PlayStation 4 and Xbox One on August 19, 2014.)

The Dragon Quest series was awarded with six world records in the 2008 Gamer's Edition of the Guinness Book of World Records, including "Best Selling Role Playing Game on the Super Famicom", "Fastest Selling Game in Japan", and "First Video Game Series to Inspire a Ballet". Likewise, the Pokémon series received eight records, including "Most Successful RPG Series of All Time". Diablo II was recognized in the 2000 standard edition of the Guinness Book of World Records for being the fastest selling computer game ever sold, with more than 1 million units sold in the first two weeks of availability; though this number has been surpassed several times since. A number of RPGs are also being exhibited in the Barbican Art Gallery's "Game On" exhibition (starting in 2002) and the Smithsonian's "The Art of Video Games" exhibit (starting in 2012); and video game developers are now finally able to apply for grants from the US National Endowment of the Arts.

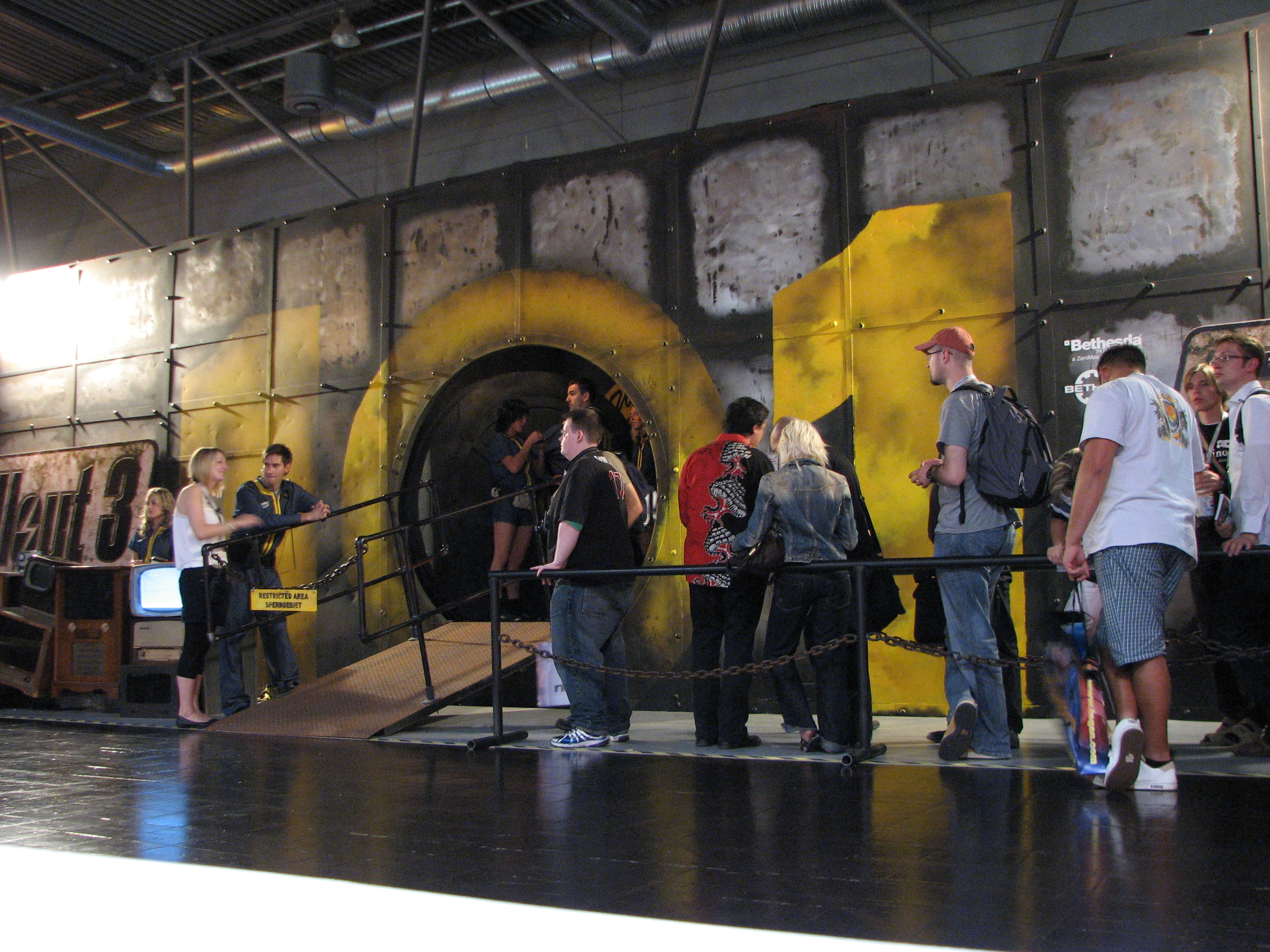
Bethesda Softworks' Fallout 3 booth at the Games Convention 2008

According to Metacritic, as of May 2011, the highest-rated video game by reviewers is the Xbox 360 version of Mass Effect 2, with an average metascore of 96 out of 100. (Note: Review aggregation sites like GameRankings and Metacritic omit reviews from many older print magazines.) According to GameRankings, the four top-rated video game RPGs, as of May 2010, are Mass Effect 2 with an average rating of 95.70% for the Xbox 360 version and 94.24% for the PC version; Fallout 3: Game of the Year Edition with an average rating of 95.40% for the PlayStation 3 version; Chrono Trigger with an average rating of 95.10%; and Star Wars: Knights of the Old Republic with an average rating of 94.18% for the Xbox version. Sales numbers for these six aforementioned titles are 10 million units sold worldwide for Final Fantasy VII as of May 2010; 161,161 units of Xenoblade Chronicles sold in Japan as of December 2010; 1.6 million units sold worldwide for Mass Effect 2 as of March 2010, just three months after release; 4.7 million units for Fallout 3 on all three platforms as of November 2008, also only a few months after publication; 3 million units for both the Xbox and PC versions of Star Wars: Knights of the Old Republic as of November 2004; and more than 2.65 million units for the SNES and PlayStation versions of Chrono Trigger as of March 2003, along with 790,000 copies for the Nintendo DS version as of March 31, 2009. Among these titles, none were PC-exclusives, three were North American multi-platform titles released for consoles like the Xbox and Xbox 360, and three were Japanese titles released for consoles like the SNES, PlayStation and Wii.

Final Fantasy VII topped GamePro's "26 Best RPGs of All Time" list in 2008, IGN's 2000 "Reader's Choice Game of the Century" poll, and the GameFAQs "Best Game Ever" audience polls in 2004 and 2005. It was also selected in Empire magazine's "100 Greatest Games of All Time" list as the highest-ranking RPG, at #2 on the list. On IGN's "Top 100 Games Of All Time" list in 2007, the highest ranking RPG is Final Fantasy VI at 9th place; and in both the 2006 and 2008 IGN Readers' Choice polls, Chrono Trigger is the top ranked RPG, in 2nd place. Final Fantasy VI is also the top ranked RPG in Game Informer's list of its 200 best games of all time list, in 8th place; and is also one of the eight games to get a cover for the magazine's 200th issue. The 2006 Famitsu readers' poll is dominated by RPGs, with nearly a dozen titles appearing in the top twenty; while most were Japanese, a few Western titles also made a showing. The highest-ranking games on the list were Final Fantasy X, followed by Final Fantasy VII and Dragon Warrior III. For the past decade, the Megami Tensei series topped several "RPGs of the Decade" lists. RPGFan's "Top 20 RPGs of the Past Decade" list was topped by Shin Megami Tensei: Digital Devil Saga & Digital Devil Saga 2 followed by Persona 3, while RPGamer's "Top RPGs of the Decade" list was topped by Persona 3, followed by Final Fantasy X and World of Warcraft.

Lastly, while in recent years Western RPGs have consistently been released on consoles such as the Xbox and Xbox 360, these systems have not shown as much market dominance in Eastern markets such as Japan, and only a few Western RPG titles have been localized to Japanese. (Note: For instance, The Elder Scrolls IV: Oblivion, which is the only Western RPG to have been awarded a near-perfect score by Japanese gaming magazine Famitsu.) Further, RPGs were not the dominant genre on the most popular of the seventh generation video game consoles, the Wii, although their presence among handheld systems such as the Nintendo DS is considerably greater.

=== Notable developers ===
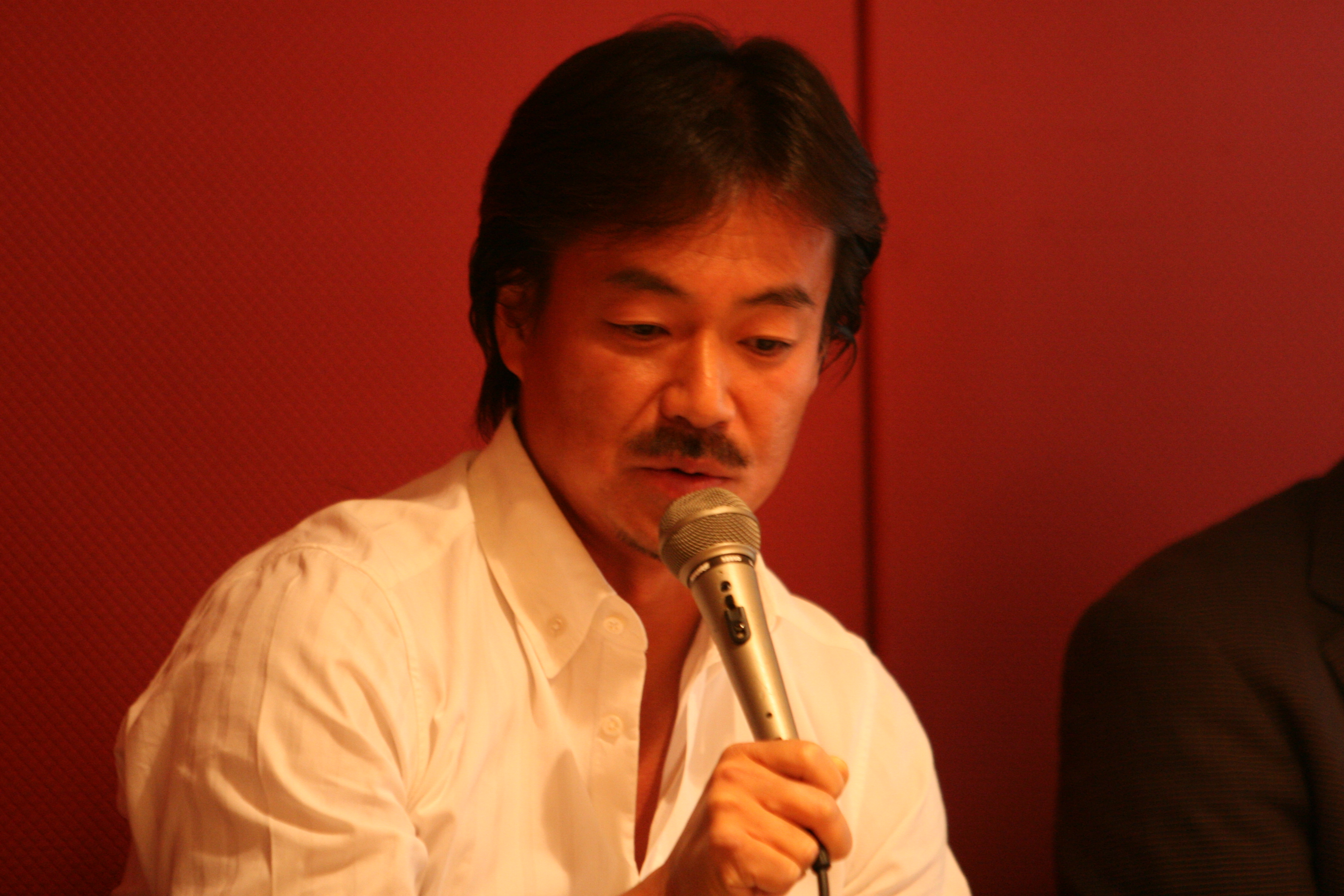
Hironobu Sakaguchi at the Game Developers Conference in San Francisco, California, in 2007

Notable early RPG developers include Don Daglow for creating the first role-playing video game, Dungeon, in 1975; Yuji Horii for creating the Dragon Quest series; Hironobu Sakaguchi for creating the Final Fantasy series; Richard Garriott for creating the Ultima series; and Brenda Romero for writing and design work on the Wizardry series. Other notable RPG developers include Bethesda Game Studios, creators of Fallout 3, Fallout 4, and The Elder Scrolls series; Ray Muzyka and Greg Zeschuk for founding BioWare; and CD Projekt, creators of The Witcher series and Cyberpunk 2077. Finally, Ryozo Tsujimoto (Monster Hunter series) and Katsura Hashino (Persona series) were cited as "Japanese Game Developers You Should Know" by 1UP.com in 2010.

=== Crowdfunding ===
Since 2009 there has been a trend of crowdfunding video games using services such as Kickstarter. Role-playing games that have been successfully crowdfunded include Serpent in the Staglands (2015), The Banner Saga series (2015 – 2018), Dead State (2014), Wasteland 2 (2014), Undertale (2015), Shadowrun Returns and its sequels (2012 – 2015), the Pillars of Eternity series (2015 – 2018), the Divinity: Original Sin series (2014 – 2017) and Torment: Tides of Numenera (2017). Due to the release of Wasteland 2, Divinity: Original Sin, The Banner Saga and Dead State (as well as some more traditionally funded titles such as Might and Magic X, Lords of Xulima and The Dark Eye: Blackguards) 2014 was called "the first year of the CRPG renaissance" by PC Gamer. However, it has been speculated that the spike in funded projects at around this time was the result of a "Kickstarter bubble", and that a subsequent slump in project funding was due to "Kickstarter fatigue".

The highest crowdfunded CRPG as of May 2017 is Torment: Tides of Numenera with $4,188,927 raised via Kickstarter. Kickstarted games have been released for the personal computer, video game console, and mobile platforms.
