= List of role-playing video games: 1988 to 1989 =

This is a comprehensive index of commercial role-playing video games (RPGs), sorted chronologically by year. Information regarding release platform, release type, RPG subgenre, game setting, developers, publishers, and country of origin is provided where available. The table can be sorted by clicking on the small boxes next to the column headings.

This list includes all RPG subgenres, including MMORPGs, Action RPGs and Tactical RPGs. This list does not include MUDs and Roguelikes by default, unless they have an additional RPG subgenre. For standalone lists on these subgenres, see List of MUDs and List of roguelikes

== Legend ==
Video game platforms
AMI	Amiga	APPII	Apple II	APPGS	Term not found
ATRST	Atari ST, Atari Falcon	C64	Commodore 64	CPC	Amstrad CPC
DOS	PC DOS / MS-DOS, Windows 3.X	FMT	FM Towns	GB	Game Boy
GEN	Genesis / Mega Drive	MAC	Classic Mac OS, 2001 and before	MSX	MSX
MSX2	MSX2	NES	Nintendo Entertainment System / Famicom	PC88	PC-8800 series
PC98	PC-9800 series	PCD	TurboGrafx-CD / PC Engine CD-ROM²	PCE	TurboGrafx-16 / PC Engine
SMS	Master System	T1000	Tandy 1000	X68K	X68000
ZX	ZX Spectrum				

Types of releases
Compilation	A compilation, anthology or collection of several titles, usually (but not always) belonging to the same series
Early access	A game launched in early access is unfinished and thus might contain bugs and glitches or have some of the content missing
Episodic	An episodic video game that is released in batches over a period of time
Expansion	A large-scale DLC to an already existing game that adds new story, areas and additions and/or changes to the game's mechanics
Full release	A full release of a game that launched in early access first
Limited	A special release (often called "Limited" or "Collector's Edition") with bonus collector's material. Often provided to people who pre-order a game
Port	The game first appeared on a different platform and a port was made. The game is like the original, with few or no differences
Remake	The game is an enhanced remake of an original, made using a new engine and/or assets and thus containing completely new sound, graphics and possibly changes to the story and/or gameplay
Remaster	The game is a remaster of an original, released on the same or different platform, with (usually minor) changes to graphics, sound and/or gameplay
Rerelease	The game was re-released on the same platform with no or only minor changes

Video game genres
Action RPG	Action role-playing game	Dungeon crawl	Dungeon crawl	JRPG	Japanese-style role-playing game
MMORPG	Massively multiplayer online RPG	Monster tamer	Monster-taming game	MUD	Multi-user dungeon
Real-time	Real-time game	Roguelike	Roguelike, Roguelite	Sandbox	Sandbox game
Soulslike	Soulslike	Tactical RPG	Tactical role-playing game	Turn-based	Turn-based game

== List ==
Year	Title	Developer	Publisher	Setting	Platform	Subgenre	Series/Notes	COO
1988 (NA)	2400 A.D.	Origin	Origin	Sci-Fi	DOS (Port)			US
1988 (NA/UK); 1991 (UK)	Advanced Dungeons and Dragons: Heroes of the Lance; Dragonlance: Heroes of the Lance	U.S. Gold; Adventure Soft	SSI; U.S. Gold	Fantasy	AMI, CPC, ATRST, ZX	Action RPG/Platformer	Advanced Dungeons and Dragons: Dragonlance franchise	US
1988 (NA/UK)	Alternate Reality: The City	Datasoft	Datasoft; Grandslam	Sci-Fi	AMI (Port), DOS (Port)	WRPG	Alternate Reality: The City	US
1988 (NA/UK)	Bards Tale, The	Interplay	EA	Fantasy	CPC (Port), ZX (Port)	WRPG	The Bards Tale	US
1988 (NA)	Bard's Tale II, The: The Destiny Knight	Interplay	EA	Fantasy	AMI (Port), APPGS (Port), DOS (Port)	WRPG	The Bard's Tale	US
1988 (NA)	Bard's Tale III, The: Thief of Fate	Interplay	EA	Fantasy	APPII, C64	WRPG	The Bard's Tale	US
1988 (NA)	BattleTech: The Crescent Hawk's Inception	Westwood	Infocom	Sci-Fi	APPII, AMI, C64, DOS, ATRST	Tactical RPG	Based on the BattleTech franchise by FASA.	US
1988 (JP)	Deep Dungeon: Madō Senki (JP) ディープダンジョン 魔洞戦記 (JP)	Scaptrust	Scaptrust	Fantasy	MSX (Port)	Dungeon crawl	Deep Dungeon	JP
1988 (JP)	Deep Dungeon III: Yūshi heno Tabi (JP) ディープダンジョンIII 勇士への旅 (JP)	HummingBird	Square	Fantasy	NES	Dungeon crawl	Deep Dungeon	JP
1988 (NA)	Demon's Winter	SSI; Novotrade	SSI	Fantasy	APPII, C64, DOS, ATRST	Tactical RPG	Shard of Spring	US
1988 (JP)	Dragon Ball: Daimaou Fukkatsu (JP) ドラゴンボール大魔王復活 (JP)	TOSE	Bandai	Fantasy	NES	Board game/RPG hybrid	Based on the manga Dragon Ball	JP
1988 (JP)	Dragon Quest II Akuryo no Kamigami (JP) ドラゴンクエストII 悪霊の神々 (JP)	Enix	Enix	Fantasy	MSX (Port)	JRPG	Dragon Quest	JP
1988 (JP)	Dragon Slayer IV: Drasle Family (JP) ドラゴンスレイヤーIVドラスレファミリー (JP)	Nihon Falcom	Nihon Falcom	Fantasy	MSX2	Dungeon crawl Platformer	Dragon Slayer	JP
1988 (JP); 1992 (NA)	Dragon Warrior III (NA); Dragon Quest III Soshite Densetsu e... (JP) ドラゴンクエストIII そして伝説へ... (JP)	Chunsoft	Enix	Fantasy	NES	JRPG	Dragon Quest	JP
1988 (NA/UK)	Dungeon Master	FTL	FTL	Fantasy	AMI (Port)	Dungeon crawler	Dungeon Master	US
1988 (NA)	Eternal Dagger, The	SSI	SSI	Fantasy	C64 (Port)	Tactical RPG	Wizard's Crown	US
1988 (JP)	Final Fantasy II (JP) ファイナルファンタジーII (JP)	Square	Square	Fantasy	NES	JRPG	Final Fantasy	JP
1988 (JP)	Gandhara (JP) ガンダーラ仏陀の聖戦 (JP)	Enix	Enix	Fantasy	MSX2	Action RPG		JP
1988 (JP/NA/PAL)	Golvellius: Valley of Doom (NA/PAL); Shin Maou Golvellius (JP) 真・魔王ゴルベリアス (JP)	Compile	Compile	Fantasy	MSX2, SMS	Action RPG	Golvellius	JP
1988 (JP)	Jaseiken Necromancer (JP) 邪聖剣ネクロマンサー (JP)	Hudson Soft	Hudson Soft	Fantasy	PCE	JRPG		JP
1988 (JP)	Kaijuu Monogatari (JP) 貝獣物語 (JP)	Birthday	Namco	Fantasy	NES	JRPG/WRPG hybrid	Kaijuu Monogatari	JP
1988 (JP)	King of Kings (JP) キング オブ キングス (JP)	Namcot	Namcot	Fantasy	NES	Tactical RPG/Wargame		JP
1988 (JP)	Last Armageddon (JP) ラストハルマゲドン (JP)	Braingrey Mind	Braingrey Mind	Fantasy	MSX2	JRPG		JP
1988 (JP)	Might and Magic Book One: The Secret of the Inner Sanctum (JP) マイトアンドマジック (JP)	New World	New World	Fantasy	MSX2	WRPG	Might and Magic	US
1988 (NA)	Might and Magic II: Gates to Another World	New World	New World	Fantasy	APPII, DOS	WRPG	Might and Magic	US
1988 (JP)	Phantasie: Jelnoa's Chapter (JP) ファンタジージェルノアの章 (JP)	SSI	Bothtec	Fantasy	MSX2 (Port)	WRPG	Phantasie	US
1988 (JP)	Phantasie II: Story of Ferronrah (JP) ファンタジーIIフェロンラの章 (JP)	SSI	Bothtec	Fantasy	MSX2 (Port)	WRPG	Phantasie	US
1988 (NA)	Phantasie III: Wrath of Nikademus	Westwood	SSI	Fantasy	DOS (Port)	WRPG	Phantasie	US
1988 (NA); 1990 (UK)	Pool of Radiance	SSI	SSI; U.S. Gold	Fantasy	C64, DOS, ATRST	Tactical RPG	AD&D: Forgotten Realms campaign setting. First game in the Gold Box series.	US
1988 (JP)	Psychic War: Cosmic Soldier 2 (JP) サイキックウォー (JP)	Kogado	Kogado	Sci-Fi	MSX, MSX2	JRPG	Cosmic Soldier	JP
1988 (NA)	Questron II	Westwood	SSI	Fantasy	AMI, APPII, APPGS, C64, DOS, ATRST		Questron	US
1988 (JP)	Saint Seiya: Ougon Densetsu Kanketsu Hen (JP) 聖闘士星矢 黄金伝説 完結編 (JP)	TOSE	Shinsei	Fantasy (Mythic)	NES	RPG / Fighting game hybrid	Saint Seiya: Ougon Densetsu	JP
1988 (NA)	Sentinel Worlds I: Future Magic	Spaceport Malibu	EA	Sci-Fi	DOS	WRPG		US
1988 (JP)	Star Cruiser	Arsys Software	Arsys Software	Sci-Fi	PC88	Action RPG; FPS/RPG; JRPG		JP
1988 (JP)	Super Black Onyx (JP) スーパーブラックオニキス (JP)	Bullet-Proof	Bullet-Proof	Fantasy	NES	Dungeon crawl	The Black Onyx	JP
1988 (WW)	Times of Lore	Origin Systems	Origin Systems	Fantasy	AMI, APPII, C64, DOS, NES, ZX	Action RPG		US
1988 (JP)	Ultima I: The First Age of Darkness (JP) ウルティマI (JP)	Origin	Pony Canyon	Fantasy	MSX2	WRPG	Ultima	US
1988 (NA)	Ultima IV: Quest of the Avatar	Origin	Origin	Fantasy	AMI (Port)	WRPG	Ultima	US
1988 (NA)	Ultima V: Warriors of Destiny	Origin	Origin	Fantasy	APPII, C64 (Port), DOS (Port)	WRPG	Ultima	US
1988 (NA)	Wasteland	EA	EA	Post-apocalyptic	APPII, C64, DOS	WRPG	Wasteland; Spiritual predecessor of Fallout.	US
1988 (NA)	Wizard Wars	Out of the Blue	Paragon Software	Fantasy	DOS	WRPG		US
1988 (NA)	Wizardry II: The Knight of Diamonds	Sir-Tech	Sir-Tech	Fantasy	C64 (Port)	Dungeon crawl	Wizardry	US
1988 (NA)	Wizardry IV: The Return of Werdna	Sir-Tech	Sir-Tech	Fantasy	DOS (Port)	Dungeon crawl	Wizardry	US
1988 (NA)	Wizardry V: Heart of the Maelstrom	Sir-Tech	Sir-Tech	Fantasy	APPII, C64	Dungeon crawl	Wizardry	US
1988 (JP)	XZR (JP) エグザイル (JP)	Telenet Japan	Telenet Japan	Fantasy (historical)	MSX	Action RPG	Exile	JP
1988 (JP)	XZR II (JP) エグザイルII (JP)	Telenet Japan	Telenet Japan	Fantasy (historical)	MSX2	Action RPG	Exile	JP
1988 (JP/NA/PAL)	Ys I: Ancient Ys Vanished (INT) イースI (JP)	Nihon Falcom	Victor Music Industries	Fantasy	PCE, SMS, NES, PC88, PC98	Action RPG; JRPG	Ys	JP
1988 (JP)	Ys II: Ancient Ys Vanished - The Final Chapter (JP) イースII (JP)	Falcom	Falcom	Fantasy	MSX2	Action RPG; JRPG	Ys	JP
1988 (JP)	Yūshi no Monshō: Deep Dungeon (JP) 勇士の紋章 ディープダンジョン (JP)	Scaptrust	Scaptrust	Fantasy	MSX (Port)	Dungeon crawl	Deep Dungeon	JP
1989 (NA)	Advanced Dungeons and Dragons: Heroes of the Lance	U.S. Gold	SSI	Fantasy	C64 (Port), DOS (Port)	Action RPG/Platformer	Advanced Dungeons and Dragons: Based on the Dragonlance franchise	US
1989 (NA)	Advanced Dungeons and Dragons: Hillsfar	Westwood	SSI	Fantasy	AMI, C64, DOS, ATRST	Action RPG	Advanced Dungeons and Dragons: Forgotten Realms campaign setting	US
1989 (JP)	Arcus II: Silent Symphony (JP) アークスII (JP)	Wolfteam (JP)	Wolfteam (JP)	Fantasy	MSX2	JRPG	Arcus	JP
1989 (NA)	Bards Tale, The	Interplay	EA	Fantasy	MAC (Port)	WRPG	The Bards Tale	US
1989 (NA)	Centauri Alliance	Michael Cranford	Broderbund	Sci-fi	APPII, C64	WRPG		US
1989 (NA); 1986 (JP)	Curse of Babylon; Babylon (J)	XTALSOFT	Kyodai; Broderbund	Fantasy	C64	Action RPG		JP
1989 (NA/UK)	Curse of the Azure Bonds	SSI	SSI; U.S. Gold	Fantasy	APPII, C64, DOS	Tactical RPG	AD&D: Forgotten Realms campaign setting. Gold Box series.	US
1989 (NA/UK)	Death Bringer	Pandora	Spotlight (Cinemaware)	Fantasy	AMI, C64, DOS, ATRST	Dungeon crawl		UK
1989 (NA)	Demon's Winter	Novotrade	SSI	Fantasy	AMI (Port)	Tactical RPG	Shard of Spring	US
1989 (JP); 1990 (NA)	Destiny of an Emperor (NA); Tenchi o Kurau (JP) 天地を喰らう (JP)	Capcom (NA/JP)	Capcom (NA/JP)	Fantasy	NES	JRPG		JP
1989 (JP); 1990 (NA)	Double Dungeons (NA/JP) ダブルダンジョン (JP)	NCS (JP)	NCS (JP)	Fantasy	PCE	Dungeon crawl		JP
1989 (JP)	Dragon Ball 3: Gokuuden (JP) ドラゴンボール3 悟空伝 (JP)	TOSE (JP)	Bandai (JP)		NES	Board game/RPG	Based on the manga Dragon Ball	JP
1989 (JP)	Dragon Knight ドラゴンナイト	ELF	ELF	Fantasy	DOS	JRPG; Eroge	Dragon Knight	JP
1989 (JP)	Dragon Slayer: The Legend of Heroes (JP) ドラゴンスレイヤー英雄伝説 (JP)	Nihon Falcom (JP)	Nihon Falcom (JP)	Fantasy	PC88, PC98, X68K	JRPG	Dragon Slayer; The Legend of Heroes	JP
1989 (NA)	Dragon Wars	Interplay	Activision	Fantasy	AMI, APPII, APPGS, C64, T1000, DOS	WRPG	Spiritual successor to The Bard's Tale III: Thief of Fate.	US
1989 (NA/UK)	Dragons of Flame	U.S. Gold	SSI; U.S. Gold	Fantasy	AMI, DOS, ATRST	Action RPG	AD&D: Dragonlance franchise	US
1989 (NA/EU)	Drakkhen	Infogrames	Data East; Infogrames	Fantasy	AMI, DOS, ATRST	WRPG/Adventure game hybrid	Drakkhen	FR
1989 (JP/NA)	Dungeon Explorer (NA/JP) ダンジョンエクスプローラー (JP)	Atlus Co.	Hudson Soft; NEC	Fantasy	PCE	Action RPG		JP
1989 (JP); 1990 (NA)	Dungeon Magic: Sword of the Elements (NA); Dungeon & Magic: Swords of Element (JP) ダンジョン&マジック ソード オブ エレメント (JP)	Natsume	Natsume; Taito	Fantasy	NES	Dungeon crawl		JP
1989 (NA); 1992 (EU)	Dungeon Master	FTL	FTL	Fantasy	APPGS, DOS (Port)	Dungeon crawl Action RPG	Dungeon Master	US
1989 (NA/JP)	Dungeon Master: Chaos Strikes Back	FTL	FTL	Fantasy	AMI, ATRST, FMT, PC98, X68K	Dungeon crawl Action RPG	Dungeon Master	US
1989 (JP)	Emerald Dragon (JP) エメラルドドラゴン (JP)	Glodia (JP)	Bashou House (JP)	Fantasy	PC88	JRPG		JP
1989 (JP)	Famicom Jump: Hero Retsuden (JP) ファミコンジャンプ 英雄列伝 (JP)	TOSE (JP)	Bandai (JP)	Sci-Fi	NES	Action RPG	Based on the anime and manga, JoJo's Bizarre Adventure	JP
1989 (JP); 1990 (NA)	Faria: A World of Mystery and Danger (NA); Faria: Fuuin no Tsurugi (JP) ファリア 封印の剣 (JP)	Game Arts; Hi-Score	Nexoft	Fantasy	NES	Action RPG		JP
1989 (JP)	Final Fantasy (JP) ファイナルファンタジー (JP)	Square (JP)	Microcabin (JP)	Fantasy	MSX2 (Port)	JRPG	Final Fantasy	JP
1989 (JP); 1990 (NA)	Final Fantasy Legend, The (NA); Makai Toushi Sa•Ga (JP) 魔界塔士 Sa・Ga (JP)	Square (NA/JP)	Square (NA/JP)	Fantasy	GB	JRPG	SaGa	JP
1989 (JP)	Hercules no Eikō II: Titan no Metsubō (JP) ヘラクレスの栄光II タイタンの滅亡 (JP)	Data East (JP)	Data East (JP)	Fantasy	NES	JRPG	Hercules no Eikō	JP
1989 (NA)	Hero's Quest: So You Want to Be a Hero; Quest for Glory: So You Want to Be a Hero	Sierra	Sierra	Fantasy	DOS	WRPG/Adventure game hybrid	Quest for Glory	US
1989 (JP)	Hydlide 3: Yami Kara no Houmonsha (JP) ハイドライド 3 (JP)	T&E (JP)	Namco (JP)	Fantasy	NES	Action RPG	Hydlide	JP
1989 (JP)	Jajamaru Ninpou Chou (JP) じゃじゃ丸忍法帳 (JP)	NMK (JP)	Jaleco (JP)		NES	JRPG	Ninja Jajamaru-kun	JP
1989 (EU)	Kayden Garth	Mentrox Goldline	EAS Software	Sci-Fi	C64, ATRST	WRPG		DE?
1989 (NA)	Knights of Legend	Todd Porter	Origin	Fantasy	APPII, C64, DOS	WRPG		US
1989 (JP)	Laplace no Ma (JP); Laplace's Evil Spirit (JP) ラプラスの魔 (JP)	HummingBird (JP)	HummingBird (JP)	Survival horror	MSX2		Laplace no Ma	JP
1989 (JP)	La Salle Ishii no Child's Quest (JP) ラサール石井のチャイルズクエスト (JP)	Namco (JP)	Namco (JP)	Music/Comedy	NES	JRPG		JP
1989 (JP); 1992 (NA)	Legend of the Ghost Lion (NA); White Lion Densetsu: Pyramid no Kanata ni (JP) ホワイトライオン伝説 (JP)	Kemco	Kemco	Fantasy	NES	JRPG		JP
1989 (NA)	Legends of the Lost Realm: The Gathering of Heroes (NA)	Avalon Hill Microcomputer Games Division	Avalon Hill	Fantasy	MAC	WRPG	Legends of the Lost Realm	US
1989 (NA)	Legends of the Lost Realm II: Wilderlands (NA)	Avalon Hill Microcomputer Games Division	Avalon Hill	Fantasy	MAC	WRPG	Legends of the Lost Realm	US
1989 (JP); 1990 (NA); 1991 (PAL)	Little Ninja Brothers; Super Chinese 2: Dragon Kid スーパーチャイニーズ2 ドラゴンキッド	Culture Brain	Culture Brain	Fantasy	NES	Action-RPG	Super Chinese	JP
1989 (NA)	Magic Candle, The	Mindcraft	Mindcraft	Fantasy	APPII, C64, DOS		The Magic Candle	CA
1989 (JP)	Master of Monsters マスターオブモンスターズ	SystemSoft	SystemSoft	Fantasy	MSX	Tactical RPG	Master of Monsters	JP
1989 (JP)	Master of Monsters Map Collection マスターオブモンスターズマップコレクション	SystemSoft	SystemSoft	Fantasy	MSX	Tactical RPG	Resource pack for Master of Monsters.	JP
1989 (NA/JP)	Might and Magic II: Gates to Another World マイトアンドマジックブック2	New World	StarCraft; New World	Fantasy	MSX2, C64	WRPG	Might and Magic	US
1989 (JP)	Mother	Ape; Nintendo	Nintendo	Modern	NES	JRPG	Mother	JP
1989 (JP)	Phantasie III: Wrath of Nikademus ファンタジーIIIニカデモスの怒り	SSI	Bothtec	Fantasy	MSX2	WRPG	Phantasie	US
1989 (JP)	Phantasy Star II ファンタシースター II 還らざる時の終わりに	Sega-AM7	Sega	Sci-Fi	GEN	JRPG	Phantasy Star	JP
1989 (NA); 1989 (JP)	Pool of Radiance	SSI	SSI; Pony Canyons (JP port)	Fantasy	APPII (Port), MAC (Port) PC88 (Port)	Tactical RPG	AD&D: Forgotten Realms campaign setting. First game in the Gold Box series.	US JP (PC88)
1989 (JP)	SD Snatcher; SDスナッチャー	Konami	Konami	Sci-Fi	MSX2	JRPG	Snatcher	JP
1989 (NA)	Sentinel Worlds I: Future Magic	Novotrade	EA	Sci-Fi	C64 (Port)			US
1989 (JP)	Shiryou Sensen: War of the Dead 死霊戦線		Victor Music Industries	Fantasy; Survival horror	PCE	Action RPG	Shiryou Sensen: War of the Dead	JP
1989 (NA)	Space Rogue	Origin	Origin	Sci-Fi	C64, DOS, MAC, APPII	Combination space sim and WRPG		US
1989 (JP)	Square no Tom Sawyer スクウェアのトムソーヤ	Square	Square		NES			JP
1989 (NA)	Starflight	Binary Systems; MicroMagic	EA	Sci-Fi	AMI (Port), C64 (Port)	Combination space sim and WRPG	Starflight	US
1989 (NA)	Starflight 2: Trade Routes of the Cloud Nebula	Binary Systems	EA	Sci-Fi	DOS	Combination space sim and WRPG	Starflight	US
1989 (JP); 1990 (NA); 1991 (EU)	Super Hydlide スーパーハイドライド	T&E	Seismic	Fantasy	GEN	Action RPG	Hydlide	JP
1989 (JP)	Sweet Home スウィートホーム	Capcom	Capcom	Fantasy; Survival horror	NES	JRPG	Spiritual precursor to Resident Evil	JP
1989 (JP); 1991 (NA/PAL)	Sword Of Hope, The; Selection: Erabareshi Mono セレクション 選ばれし者	Kemco	Kemco; Seika Corp.	Fantasy	GB	Action RPG		JP
1989 (JP); 1990 (NA)	Sword of Vermilion; Vermilion ヴァーミリオン	Sega-AM2	Sega	Fantasy	GEN	Action-RPG		JP
1989 (NA)	Swords of Twilight	Free Fall Associates	Electronic Arts, Inc.	Fantasy	AMI	Action-RPG		US
1989 (JP)	Tao 究極の世紀末ロープレ 道	Vap	Vap	Fantasy	NES			JP
1989 (JP)	Tengai Makyō: Ziria 天外魔境 ZIRIA	Red Ent.	Hudson Soft	Fantasy	PCD	JRPG	Tengai Makyou	JP
1989 (JP)	Tenkaichi Bushi Keru Nagūru ケルナグール	Game Studio	Namco		NES	Fighting/RPG hybrid		JP
1989 (JP)	Ultima IV: Quest of the Avatar; Ultima: Seisha he no Michi ウルティマ 聖者への道	Origin	Pony Canyon	Fantasy	NES (Port)	WRPG	Ultima	US
1989 (NA)	Ultima V: Warriors of Destiny	Origin	Origin	Fantasy	ATRST (Port)	WRPG	Ultima	US
1989 (NA)	Ultima Trilogy	Origin	Origin	Fantasy	APPII (Comp), C64 (Comp), DOS (Comp)	WRPG	Ultima compilation	US
1989 (NA)	WiBArM	Arsys Software	Broderbund	Sci-Fi	DOS (Port)	Action RPG; Run-and-gun; JRPG		JP
1989 (JP/NA); 1993 (PAL)	Willow ウィロー	Capcom	Capcom	Fantasy	NES	Action RPG		US/JP
1989 (JP)	Wizardry II: The Knight of Diamonds ウィザードリィ2	Sir-Tech Software	ASCII	Fantasy	MSX2 (Port)	Dungeon crawl	Wizardry	US
1989 (NA/JP)	Wizardry II: Llylgamyn no Isan ウィザードリィII リルガミンの遺産	Sir-Tech Software	ASCII; Sir-Tech	Fantasy	NES (Port), C64 (Port)	Dungeon crawl	Wizardry	US
1989 (JP)	Xak: The Art of Visual Stage サーク	Microcabin	Microcabin	Fantasy	MSX2, PC88, PC98, X68K	Action RPG	Xak	JP
1989 (NA)	Ys I: Ancient Ys Vanished	Nihon Falcom; Unlimited	Kyodai; Broderbund	Fantasy	APPGS (Port), DOS (Port)	Action RPG; JRPG	Ys	JP
1989 (JP); 1990 (NA)	Ys I & II イースI・II	Nihon Falcom; Hudson Soft	Hudson Soft	Fantasy	PCD(Comp)	Action RPG	Ys	JP
1989 (JP)	Ys III: Wanderers from Ys イースIII -ワンダラーズフロムイース-	Nihon Falcom	Nihon Falcom	Fantasy	PC88, PC98, X68K, MSX2	Action RPG; Platformer	Ys	JP
