= List of HummingBirdSoft games =

The following is a list of computer and video games developed or published by the defunct company HummingBirdSoft.

== NEC PC-8801 ==
- 1984
  - Abyss
  - 地獄の練習問題
- 1985
  - Abyss II: Tears of Emperor
- 1987
  - The Stone of Agni
  - Laplace no Ma ラプラスの魔

== NEC PC-88VA ==
- 1988
  - Record of Lodoss War: The Grey Witch

== NEC PC-9801 ==
- 1987
  - Laplace no Ma ラプラスの魔
- 1988
  - Record of Lodoss War: The Grey Witch
- 1990
  - Record of Lodoss War: 福神漬
- 1991
  - Record of Lodoss War II: 五色の魔竜
- 1992
  - Record of Lodoss War: 福神漬3
- 1994
  - Paracelsus no Maken パラケルススの魔剣

== NEC PC-9821 ==
  - Record of Lodoss War: The Grey Witch

== Sharp X68000 ==
- 1987
  - ラプラスの魔
- 1988
  - Record of Lodoss War: The Grey Witch
- 1990
  - Record of Lodoss War: 福神漬
- 1991
  - Record of Lodoss War II: 五色の魔竜

== Fujitsu FM-7 ==
- 1983
  - The Palms
  - The Knight of Wonderland
- 1984
  - Abyss
  - Recapture
  - 地獄の練習問題
  - Rock'n Roller
- 1985
  - Tape Abyss
  - Abyss II: Tears of Emperor
- 1987
  - ラプラスの魔

== Fujitsu FM-8 ==
- 1983
  - The Palms
  - The Knight of Wonderland
- 1984
  - Abyss
  - Recapture
  - 地獄の練習問題
  - Rock'n Roller
- 1985
  - Tape Abyss

== Fujitsu FM-77 ==
- 1983
  - The Knight of Wonderland
- 1984
  - Abyss
  - 地獄の練習問題

== Fujitsu FM-77AV ==
- 1987
  - Fire Ball

== FM Towns ==
- 1994
  - Record of Lodoss War: The Grey Witch

== MSX2 ==
- 1987
  - Fire Ball
  - The Stone of Agni
- 1988
  - Record of Lodoss War: The Grey Witch
- 1990
  - Record of Lodoss War: Fuku Zinduke

== MSX2+ ==
- 1988
  - Record of Lodoss War: The Grey Witch

== Famicom Disk System ==
- 1986
  - Deep Dungeon: The Heretic War
- 1987
  - Deep Dungeon II: The Crest of the Hero

== Nintendo Entertainment System ==
- 1988
  - Deep Dungeon III: The Journey to the Hero
- 1990
  - Deep Dungeon IV: The Black Sorcerer

== Super Nintendo Entertainment System ==
- 1995
  - Laplace no Ma ラプラスの魔
  - Record of Lodoss War

== 3DO ==
- 1994
  - Kurokishi no Kamen
