= Dai Senryaku VII: Modern Military Tactics =

2001 video game

- North American cover art
- Developer: SystemSoft
- Publishers: JP: SystemSoft; NA: Kemco (Xbox); NA: Valcon Games (PlayStation 2)
- Series: Daisenryaku
- Platforms: Windows, Xbox, PlayStation 2, PlayStation Portable
- Release: Windows: JP: December 20, 2001; Xbox: JP: May 29, 2003; NA: February 16, 2005; PlayStation 2: JP: December 14, 2006; NA: December 19, 2007; PlayStation Portable: JP: May 22, 2008
- Genre: Turn-based strategy
- Modes: Single-player, Multiplayer

Dai Senryaku VII: Modern Military Tactics, known as Daisenryaku VII in Japan, is a turn-based tactics video game, originally released for the Windows on December 20, 2001. It is a part of the Daisenryaku series of war strategy games. An expansion pack was released for the PC version. The game was ported to the Xbox on May 29, 2003 as a part of Microsoft's push in the Japanese market. It was translated and published by Kemco in North America on February 16, 2005. It was ported to the PlayStation 2 and released in Japan in 2006. The PlayStation 2 version was released as Dai Senryaku VII: Modern Military Tactics Exceed in North America in 2007. A PlayStation Portable port was released in Japan in 2008.

== Gameplay ==
The game can be played as one of eight countries consisting of the United States, Japan, France, Germany, Russia, United Kingdom, Israel, or China. For the first time in the series, the game map is rendered in 3D and can be rotated. There is a Missions mode, Campaign (PS2 only), Free Play, and Map Editor available to players.

Missions mode acts as the game's story mode, documenting a war between the Blue and Red armies. There are 25 missions in total, with unlockable maps and additional units becoming available as a completion bonus. The PlayStation exclusive campaign mode features numerous maps featuring real-life locations and scenarios. One such campaign, the "East Mediterranean War", has the player commanding Russian forces in an attempt to secure a Mediterranean base in Cyprus and aiding Syrian forces in Lebanon fighting the US and Israel. The campaign missions allow PS2 players to unlock units that were originally blocked behind passcodes on the Xbox.

== Reception ==
Reception

Aggregate score
| Aggregator | Score |
|---|---|
| Metacritic | 74/100 |

Review scores
| Publication | Score |
|---|---|
| GameSpot | 8/10 |
| IGN | 5.8/10 |
| TeamXbox | 7/10 |

On its release, Dai Senryaku VII was met with "mixed or average" reviews from critics, with an aggregate score of 74/100 on Metacritic for Xbox.
