= Sub Battle Simulator =

1987 video game

- Developer: TX Digital Illusions
- Publishers: NA: Epyx; EU: U.S. Gold
- Platforms: Amiga, Apple IIGS, Commodore 64, Atari ST, Macintosh, MS-DOS, Tandy Color Computer 3.
- Release: 1987
- Genre: Submarine simulator

Sub Battle Simulator is a naval combat simulation game released by Epyx in 1987. The game was developed by Digital Illusions, Inc. It was released for the Amiga, Apple IIGS, Commodore 64, Atari ST, Macintosh, MS-DOS, and the Tandy Color Computer 3.

== Description ==
Sub Battle Simulator sets the action in times of World War 2, with the player on the American or German side. There are 36 German missions and 24 American missions in which the player can command six different submarines. The player is responsible for navigation, using five different levels of mapping, attacks' planning based on weather and surroundings as well as paying attention to the radar. The game gives the possibility to play underwater or on the surface. A player can choose target practice, individual missions or war commands as either a German or an American submarine Captain.

== Reception ==
Game reviewers Hartley and Pattie Lesser complimented the game in their "The Role of Computers" column in Dragon #122 (1987), calling it "the finest of the submarine simulation games" and stating "This is a real winner for wargaming enthusiasts!" Computer Gaming World was less positive, stating that "the taste is a little disappointing ... as a game, Sub Battle is fast and fun. As a simulation, it falls far from reality". The review as examples of its flaws being able to see Iceland with binoculars from 500 miles away; sinking an aircraft carrier with a deck gun; and multiple bugs. 1991 and 1993 surveys of strategy and war games gave it three stars out of five. David Plotkin of STart liked the game, stating that it was not too difficult for novices but very challenging at higher difficulty levels. Jerry Pournelle criticized a pre-release version of Sub Battle for being both too realistic (reproducing the long, uneventful periods of submarine service) and not realistic enough (too powerful on the surface against aircraft, unrealistic binoculars, buggy navigation). His review included an addendum that his complaints had been addressed by an updated version that "turns a boring simulation into an exciting game".
