= P.T.O. II =

1993 video game

- North American cover art
- Developer(s): Koei
- Publisher(s): Koei
- Platform(s): PC-98, Super NES, Saturn, PlayStation, MS-DOS, Windows
- Release: PC-98: JP: 1993; MS-DOS: JP: 1993; Super NES: JP: February 17, 1995; NA: December 1995; Saturn: JP: February 23, 1996; NA: November 20, 1996; Windows: NA: May 25, 1996; PlayStation: JP: August 23, 1996
- Genre(s): Turn-based strategy, tactical wargame
- Mode(s): Single-player, multiplayer

P.T.O. II (Pacific Theater of Operations II), released as Teitoku no Ketsudan II (提督の決断II) in Japan, is a Koei strategy video game that depicts the conflict between the US and Japan during World War II. The video game is a sequel to P.T.O. It was originally released in 1993 for the NEC PC-9801 and had been ported to various platforms since, such as the Super Nintendo Entertainment System.

The NEC PC-9801 version came with an enhancement pack. A version was released exclusively in Japan for the MS-DOS operating system; it also works on Windows operating systems from 3.1 through Windows ME.

== Gameplay ==
The Japanese fighter planes are fighting against a fleet of U.S. Air Force planes that outnumber them slightly.

P.T.O. II is a turn-based game, with each turn consisting of a move phase and a plan phase. During the move phase, the player maneuvers their ships along a non-grid-based map.

Japanese players may now invade all sides of North America through the Panama Canal; bringing a transport of troops to invade Washington, D.C. Restrictions apply in this game as the Japanese players are unable to replenish their troops in a non-Japanese harbor like Bangkok, for example. Due to limitations, there is no way to recover damage for the Air Force. Players cannot shift the older model airplanes with the newer ones. If the number of aircraft of Air Corps base units and aircraft carriers have been significantly reduced in battle, the troops can only be reorganized into different patterns.

Taking control of the naval forces of both nations, each side tries to outsmart each other. Naval forces can be equipped with new technology when it becomes available. They can handle anti-aircraft weapons, radar, aiming devices, decryption units, incendiary weapons, flamethrowers, and missile weapons. However, with the perpetual victories at the conference along with the fighting power of the units, national power for the Japanese has been enhanced. A lot of units and a dedicated infrastructure could exceed the national power of the United States a few years after starting a war against them, causing a collapse in the game balance.

The final mission in the game has an extreme level of difficulty for the player controlling the Japanese side. During the course of the scenario, the Japanese forces become increasingly suicidal and reliant on the famous Japanese battleship Yamato in a desperate attempt to turn the tide against the Anglo-American forces. When playing the entire campaign from 1940 to the bitter end of World War II in Asia, the average player can complete the game in approximately 40 hours.

== Reception ==
Famitsu magazine scored the Super Famicom version of the game a 23 out of 40. GamePro's Bro' Buzz called it "an interesting war simulation that's definitely for mature gamers with a yen for history, a mind for numbers, and plenty of time to kill", but found the graphics too limited and criticized the repetitive music.

Art Angel of GamePro praised the full motion videos and animations of the Saturn version, saying they "convey a sense of history and fantasy". He was also pleased with the intricate options and controls, and concluded that while it is slightly slower-paced than Iron Storm, P.T.O. II is still a worthwhile and enjoyable strategy game. Jeff Kitts of GameSpot similarly praised the intricate yet easy-to-use interface and high attention to detail, and concluded: "P.T.O. II may not be the most graphically-riveting war sim around, but for those interested in a nice, long, full-scale war, this game is just the ticket". Despite this, he gave it a 5.3 out of 10.
