= Kurokishi no Kamen =

1994 video game

- Developers: Group SNE; HummingBirdSoft
- Publisher: Matsushita Electric Industrial
- Series: Ghost Hunter
- Platform: 3DO Interactive Multiplayer
- Release: JP: May 28, 1994
- Genres: Dungeon crawler, role-playing
- Mode: Single-player

Kurokishi no Kamen (Note: Japanese: 黒き死の仮面; lit. "Mask of Black Death") is a video game developed by HummingBirdSoft and published by Matsushita for the 3DO Interactive Multiplayer. The game was released exclusively in Japan in 1994 as part of the Ghost Hunter dungeon crawler series, which also includes Laplace no Ma and Paracelsus no Maken from the same developer.

== Plot and gameplay ==
Kurokishi no Kamen is set in 1930's London in the abandoned Guilford Mansion. Thirty years prior to the start of the game, the mansion owner's wife, child, and three friends were brutally murdered in a kind of ritual. The case was closed when the owner hanged himself. However, rumors of strange, supernatural occurrences surrounding the structure persisted to the present day and four ghost hunters go to investigate. They are the mystic Kenichiro Kusakabe, the detective Alex Quinn, the journalist Morgan Dylan, and the scientist Vincent Hoffman. The player uses this group to explore the mansion in a first-person perspective. Tank controls allow for movement in four directions while a cursor allows for interactions with objects and the scenery.

The game features role-playing elements that are more simplified than its predecessors in the Ghost Hunter series. It features no character creation or customization as characters have fixed stats (HP, strength, etc.), equipment, and special abilities throughout its length. Encounters with malevolent spirits play out in a turn-based format. In battles, the player can choose from a number of commands including physical attacks, defending, using items, and escaping. Some commands are exclusive to certain characters. Although a powerful melee user, Kenichiro is the only character with mental power (MP) and the only one capable of psychic spells. Vincent is a weak melee attacker but is the only character who can use spirit machines to harm enemies.

== Development and release ==
Kurokishi no Kamen was developed by the Japanese studio HummingBirdSoft in association with Group SNE. The project was led by Hitoshi Yasuda, the creator of the Ghost Hunter series, which originated on NEC PCs with Laplace no Ma and Paracelsus no Maken. Characters from those games have gone on appear in books and other media attached to the franchise. Kenichiro was introduced as a powerful ghost hunter midway through Laplace no Ma because the designers were afraid its main protagonist would not be able to become one on their own. Kenichiro, Alex, Morgan, and Vincent would all reprise their roles in Kurokishi no Kamen. The game makes extensive use of full-motion video with live actors. Kurokishi no Kamen was published exclusively in Japan for the 3DO Interactive Multiplayer by Matsushita Electric Industrial on May 28, 1994.

== Reception ==
Reception

Review scores
| Publication | Score |
|---|---|
| Consoles + | 68% |
| Next Generation | 3/5 |

Next Generation reviewed the game as "Ghost Hunter", rating it three stars out of five, and stated that "it's important to being mention that, being from Japan, it's entirely in Japanese. If you don't understand the language, you won't get very far, but if you even understand a little, it's definitely worth it." The French magazine Consoles + gave a similar score of 68%, but was less kind regarding the language barrier and recommended fans of Japanese horror games stick with Doctor Hauzer to get the most out of the expensive 3DO console. Kurt Kulata of Hardcore Gaming 101 compared Kurokishi no Kamen to Mansion of Hidden Souls, another horror-themed, interactive film game.
