= TX Digital Illusions =

Video game developer

TX Digital Illusions was a video game developer located in Bryan, Texas. It was formed in the mid 1980s by Gordon Walton, Mike Jones, Rob Brannon, Don Gilman and others from Applied Computing Services about 1986, a small IT service firm. It ended up merging into Three-Sixty Pacific about 1989.

== Games ==
- Sub Battle Simulator (Epyx) - Mac/PC/Atari 800/Amiga/Apple
- PT-109 (Spectrum Holobyte) - Mac/PC
- Shard of Spring (SSI) - PC
- F-15 Strike Eagle (MicroProse) - Amiga
- Harpoon (Three-Sixty Pacific) - PC/Mac
