= Master of Monsters =

1988 video game

- PC-9801 cover art
- Developer: SystemSoft
- Publisher: SystemSoft
- Composer: Hayato Matsuo
- Platforms: MSX, PC-8801, Sharp X1, PC Engine CD, PC-9801, Genesis
- Release: JP: 1988; NA: 1991
- Genre: Turn-based strategy
- Mode: Single-player

Master of Monsters (Note: Japanese: マスターオブモンスターズ, Hepburn: Masuta obu Monsutazu) is a turn-based strategy game developed by SystemSoft for the MSX and NEC PC8801. It was ported to a variety of consoles and PCs including the PC Engine CD, NEC PC9801, and Sega Genesis/Mega Drive. While it never had the same success as its SystemSoft stablemate Daisenryaku, the game garnered a loyal following. Its success in the North American market on the Sega Genesis proved sufficient for a version on the Sega Saturn titled Master of Monsters: Neo Generations, and an anime art-style enhanced PlayStation version titled Disciples of Gaia with a Japanese role-playing game feel. Master of Monsters: Disciples of Gaia was released in 1998.

== Gameplay ==
Gameplay engages players by permitting them to summon and move monsters around a board in an effort to capture towers and to eventually defeat the opponents (which are controlled either by other humans or by the computer program). Moves are based on a hexagonal board structure, such that every tile on the board is adjacent to six other tiles. Other notable features were the large variety of monsters, upgrading ("leveling up") of veteran units and control of a "Master" character who, if killed, can end the game for that player.

The focus of the game is strategic, despite the fantasy-type characters that might imply an RPG element. Other than the existence of the Master character and magic in the game, the gameplay is very similar to System Soft's more hardcore modern warfare strategic wargame series Daisenryaku, with the exception that some versions of the Master of Monsters (such as Master of Monsters – Final) series allow equippable items, weapons and armor.

== Comparisons ==
The later Lords of Chaos by Julian Gollop of Mythos Games shares many of the same elements of summoning and tactics, along with the earlier title Chaos from 1985. David White, creator of the open-source turn-based strategy game The Battle for Wesnoth, cited Master of Monsters as an inspiration. Master of Monsters was also compared to later games such as the role-playing video game series Pokémon (which also revolves around commanding monsters) and the real-time strategy game StarCraft.

== Versions ==
System Soft Alpha returned the game to its strategy-based roots, and the two entries in the Master of Monsters series as originally popularized on the NEC 9801 PC were updated by System Soft Alpha with new graphics and gameplay features. Two more sequels were made for Japanese Windows. Released on Japanese language Windows-based systems, the remakes include マスターオブモンスターズIII Special Edition, マスターオブモンスターズ4 ～光と闇の争覇～, Master of Monsters Value Edition, and 真・マスターオブモンスターズ Final. A spin-off of the game targeted towards the younger audience was titled Masumon Kids. A mobile version of the game was released in Japan.

An updated version named Master of Monsters SSB was released for Nintendo Switch, PlayStation 4, PlayStation 5 and Windows on June 26, 2025 only in Japan.

== Re-release ==
On August 25, 2025, D4 Enterprise published the PC-9801 version of Master of Monsters Final on Project EGG.

The PlayStation version was re-released by Hamster Corporation as part of Console Archives. It was released for PlayStation 5 on May 14, 2026, and for Nintendo Switch 2 on 15 May. The re-release only supports the Japanese version regardless of region published.

== Reception ==
RPGFan gave the Sega Genesis version a negative review, finding the game "excruciatingly repetitive".
