= Legends of the Lost Realm =

1989 video game

- Developer(s): Avalon Hill
- Publisher(s): Avalon Hill
- Designer(s): David Cooke, Charles Collins
- Platform(s): Macintosh
- Release: 1989
- Genre(s): Role-playing video game
- Mode(s): Single-player

Legends of the Lost Realm is a 1989 role-playing video game published by Avalon Hill for the Macintosh. An expansion pack, Legends of the Lost Realm II: Wilderlands, was released in 1993.

== Gameplay ==
Legends of the Lost Realm is a game in which an ancient castle has recently been reclaimed by supporters of the High Kings. The game is a turn-based first-person role-playing game with a party of up to six characters. The four base character classes can be upgraded to nine specialty classes once a player character reaches a certain level.

== Reception ==
Dennis Owens reviewed the game for Computer Gaming World, and stated that "despite its problems, Legends of the Lost Realm is a fascinating, complex, and rewarding gaming experience. It is a must buy for all Mac users who are desperately wailing for role-playing games and intricate adventures."

Macworld inducted Legends of the Lost Realm into its 1990 Game Hall of Fame in the Best Role-Playing Game category, calling the game a "role-playing epic that tops Wizardry."

Lisa Stevens reviewed Legends of the Lost Realm in White Wolf #26 (April/May, 1991), rating it a 2 out of 5 and stated that "this game is fine for a romp in the dungeon, but for those people who are used to more sophisticated adventure games, you will end up being disappointed. I don't feel the game measured up to the hype on the back of the box".
