= Daisenryaku =

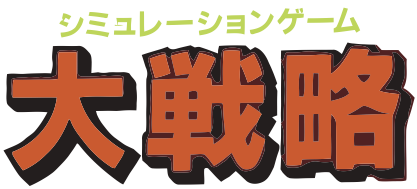

Daisenryaku (大戦略, Great Strategy) is a series of war strategy video games by SystemSoft and SystemSoft Alpha in Japan. The series debuted in Japan in 1985 with Gendai Daisenryaku (現代大戦略, Modern Great Strategy) exclusively for the NEC PC-98.

Games in the franchise have been released for many platforms including the PC-88, X1, FM-7, MSX, Famicom, Mega Drive, Turbo CD, Game Boy, Game Gear, Super Famicom, Sega Saturn, Dreamcast, Game Boy Advance, Nintendo DS, PlayStation, PlayStation 2, PlayStation Portable, PlayStation 3, PlayStation Vita, PlayStation 4, Windows, Macintosh and other mobile devices.

In April 1993, Famicom Tsūshin (Famitsu) magazine awarded the Daisenryaku series a world record for being ported to the most game consoles. It was ported to seven consoles up until then, including the Game Boy and Mega Drive.

== Daisenryaku titles ==
=== Personal computer ===
Name	Released	Platform
Gendai Daisenryaku	November 1985	PC-98
Daisenryaku 88	August 1986	PC-88
Daisenryaku X1	December 1986	X1
Daisenryaku II	March 20, 1987	PC-98
Daisenryaku FM	August 1987	FM-7
Daisenryaku	November 1987	MSX2
Super Daisenryaku	1988	PC-88
Campaign-ban Daisenryaku II	November 1988	PC-88
Super Daisenryaku	May 1989	MSX2
Daisenryaku III: Great Commander	June 24, 1989	PC-98
Campaign-ban Daisenryaku II	December 1989	PC-98
Daisenryaku III '90	October 1990	PC-98
Daisenryaku III '90	December 1991	X68000
Campaign-ban Daisenryaku II	June 1992	MSX2
Daisenryaku IV	June 1992	PC-98
Advanced Daisenryaku 98	April 2, 1998	PC
Advanced Daisenryaku 98 II	August 5, 1999	PC
Advanced Daisenryaku 2001	April 26, 2001	PC
Daisenryaku VII	December 20, 2001	PC
Daisenryaku Perfect	March 20, 2003	PC
Advanced Daisenryaku IV	August 21, 2003	PC
Daisenryaku Centurion	June 15, 2006	PC
Advanced Daisenryaku 5	June 29, 2006	PC
Shin Daisenryaku: Battle of Soldier	March 13, 2009	PC
Daisenryaku Perfect 2.0	November 20, 2009	PC
Daisenryaku: Dai Tōa Kōbōshi: Nii Takayama no Bore - Ichini Maru Hachi	November 20, 2009	PC
Daisenryaku: Dai Tōa Kōbōshi - Dainijisekaitaisen Boppatsu - Sūjiku Sentai Rengougun Zensekaisen	November 22, 2009	PC
Daisenryaku SSB	February 3, 2022	PC
Daisenryaku SSB2	February 26, 2026	PC

=== Console ===
Name	Release dates	Platforms
Daisenryaku	JP: October 11, 1988	Famicom
Super Daisenryaku	JP: April 29, 1989	Mega Drive
Advanced Daisenryaku: Deutsch Dengeki Sakusen	JP: June 21, 1991	Mega Drive
Lord of Wars	JP: November 21, 1991	Turbo CD
Campaign-ban Daisenryaku II	JP: May 29, 1992	Turbo CD
Daisenryaku Expert	JP: September 25, 1992	Super Famicom
Barbarossa	JP: November 27, 1992	Super Famicom
World Advanced Daisenryaku Kōtetsu no Senpū	JP: September 22, 1995	Sega Saturn
World Advanced Daisenryaku: Sakusen File	JP: March 15, 1996	Sega Saturn
Daisenryaku: Players Spirit	JP: March 29, 1996	PlayStation
Iron Storm	NA: May 8, 1996	Sega Saturn
Daisenryaku Expert WWII: War in Europe	JP: August 30, 1996	Super Famicom
Advanced World War Sennen Teikoku no Kōbō: Last of the Millennium	JP: March 20, 1997	Sega Saturn
Daisenryaku Strong Style	JP: June 27, 1997	Sega Saturn
Daisenryaku: Master Combat	JP: December 12, 1998	PlayStation
Cyber Daisenryaku: Shutsugeki! Harukatai	JP: February 4, 1999	PlayStation
Advanced Daisenryaku: Europe no Arashi - Doitsu Dengeki Sakusen	JP: June 22, 2000	Dreamcast
Advanced Daisenryaku 2001	JP: April 26, 2001	Dreamcast
Daisenryaku VII / Dai Senryaku VII: Modern Military Tactics	Xbox: JP: May 29, 2003; NA: February 16, 2005; PlayStation 2: JP: December 14, 2006; NA: December 19, 2007	Xbox, PlayStation 2
Daisenryaku 1941: Gyakuten no Taiheiyō	JP: November 3, 2003	PlayStation 2
Standard Daisenryaku: Dengekisen	JP: November 11, 2004	PlayStation 2
Standard Daisenryaku: Ushinawareta Shōri	JP: June 2, 2005	PlayStation 2
Sega Ages Vol. 22 Advanced Daisenryaku Doitsu Dengeki Sakusen	JP: February 26, 2006	PlayStation 2
Daisenryaku VII Exceed	JP: December 14, 2006; NA: December 19, 2007	PlayStation 2
Daisenryaku: Dai Tōa Kōbōshi - Tora Tora Tora Ware Kishuu Ni Seikou Seri	JP: September 25, 2008	PlayStation 2
Gendai Daisenryaku: Isshoku Sokuhatsu - Gunji Balance Hōkai	JP: August 27, 2009	PlayStation 2
Daisenryaku: Dai Tōa Kōbōshi - Tora Tora Tora Ware Kishuu Ni Seikou Seri	JP: June 20, 2013	PlayStation 3
Daisenryaku Perfect: Senjō no Hasha	JP: February 6, 2014	PlayStation 3
Daisenryaku: Dai Tōa Kōbōshi - Dainijisekaitaisen Boppatsu - Sūjiku Sentai Rengougun Zensekaisen	JP: March 26, 2015	PlayStation 3
Daisenryaku Exceed II	JP: July 30, 2015	PlayStation 3
Daisenryaku: Daitoua Kōbōshi 3 - Dai-ni-ji Sekai Taisen Boppatsu!	JP: December 17, 2015	PlayStation 4
Daisenryaku Perfect 4.0	PlayStation 4: JP: April 26, 2018; Nintendo Switch: JP: September 20, 2018	PlayStation 4, Nintendo Switch
Gendai Daisenryaku 2020: Shaking World Order! Ambition of the Great Powers and World War	PlayStation 4: JP: February 27, 2020; Nintendo Switch: JP: June 24, 2021	PlayStation 4, Nintendo Switch
Daisenryaku SSB	PS4, Switch: JP: December 8, 2022; PlayStation 5: JP: July 17, 2025	PlayStation 4, Nintendo Switch, PlayStation 5
Daisenryaku SSB2	JP: February 26, 2026	Nintendo Switch, Nintendo Switch 2, PlayStation 5

=== Handheld ===
Name	Release dates	Platform
Daisenryaku	JP: June 12, 1991	Game Boy
Taisen-gata Daisenryaku G	JP: September 28, 1991	Game Gear
Daisenryaku for Game Boy Advance	JP: December 7, 2001	Game Boy Advance
Daisenryaku Portable	JP: December 22, 2005	PlayStation Portable
Daisenryaku DS	JP: May 25, 2006	Nintendo DS
Daisenryaku Portable 2	JP: December 14, 2006	PlayStation Portable
Daisenryaku VII Exceed	JP: May 22, 2008	PlayStation Portable
Daisenryaku: Dai Tōa Kōbōshi - Tora Tora Tora Ware Kishuu Ni Seikou Seri	JP: September 25, 2008	PlayStation Portable
Gendai Daisenryaku: Isshoku Sokuhatsu - Gunji Balance Hōkai	PlayStation Portable: JP: August 27, 2009; Nintendo DS: JP: February 25, 2010	PlayStation Portable, Nintendo DS
Daisenryaku Perfect: Senjō no Hasha	JP: June 24, 2010	PlayStation Portable
Daisenryaku: Dai Tōa Kōbōshi - Dainijisekaitaisen Boppatsu - Sūjiku Sentai Rengougun Zensekaisen	PlayStation Portable: JP: July 31, 2014; Vita: JP: March 26, 2015	PlayStation Portable, Vita
Daisenryaku Exceed II	JP: July 30, 2015	Vita
Daisenryaku Perfect: Senjō no Hasha	JP: March 3, 2016	Vita
Daisenryaku: Daitoua Kōbōshi DX -DainiJi Sekai Taisen	JP: May 23, 2019	3DS

=== Mobile phone ===
Name	Released	Platform
Daisenryaku ONLINE	i-mode: JP: March 20, 2006; EZweb: JP: May 22, 2008	i-mode, EZweb

== Notable games ==
=== Early titles ===
Gendai Daisenryaku (現代大戦略, Modern Great Strategy) is the first title in the series, released in November 1985 exclusively for the NEC PC-98. It sold 20,000 copies.

Its successor, Daisenryaku II, modified game systems including the order of unit's move, the defence statistic of cities, indirect fire, warships, and increased a variety of weapons. It sold 50,000 copies. Daisenryaku II was too rich and complex for 8-bit computers, so it was ported to them and gaming consoles as a simplified version titled Super Daisenryaku.

Daisenryaku III changed the game system from turn-based strategy to real-time strategy. Daisenryaku titles for the PC-98 had been developed for its built-in BASIC interpreter (N88-BASIC (86), a variant of Microsoft BASIC). Daisenryaku III was very slow, so it was superseded by the pre-compiled distribution of Daisenryaku III '90.

=== Advanced Daisenryaku: Deutsch Dengeki Sakusen ===
Advanced Daisenryaku: Deutsch Dengeki Sakusen
- Developer: Sega
- Publisher: Sega
- Series: Daisenryaku
- Platforms: Mega Drive, PlayStation 2
- Release: Mega Drive: JP: June 17, 1991; PlayStation 2: JP: February 23, 2006
- Genre: Strategy
- Modes: Single-player, multiplayer

Advanced Daisenryaku: Deutsch Dengeki Sakusen is a Mega Drive war game. The game takes place during World War II, and the player can either play as Germany, its allies or its opponents. Multiplayer games are possible, using the modem that was sold for the Sega Mega Drive.

=== Daisenryaku Expert WWII: War in Europe ===
Daisenryaku Expert WWII: War in Europe
- Developer: SystemSoft
- Publisher: ASCII Entertainment
- Series: Daisenryaku
- Platform: Super Famicom
- Release: JP: August 30, 1996
- Genre: Strategy
- Modes: Single-player, multiplayer

Daisenryaku Expert WWII: War in Europe (大戦略エキスパートWWII; "Great Strategy Expert WWII") is a Super Famicom game that takes place during World War II at either the Eastern Front or the Western Front. There is a scenario mode and a campaign mode. By default, the player controls the Third Reich but it can be changed prior to starting the game.

An remake of the game was released in 2006 for the PlayStation 2 as a part of the Sega Ages 2500 series.

=== Iron Storm ===
Iron Storm is the 1996 North American release of World Advanced Daisenryaku: Kōtetsu no Senpū (ワールドアドバンスド大戦略 〜鋼鉄の戦風〜) for the Sega Saturn. The game takes place within the context of World War II. The game is played as either United States, Nazi Germany, or Japan. The outcomes of certain battles result in a change in the path of the war.

Electronic Gaming Monthly gave the game an 8 out of 10, praising the ability to view the outcome of each battle in cinematic view and the use of experience points.

=== Advanced Daisenryaku 2001 ===
Advanced Daisenryaku 2001
- Developer: SystemSoft
- Publisher: Sega
- Series: Daisenryaku
- Platforms: Dreamcast, PC
- Release: Dreamcast: JP: April 26, 2001; Windows PC: JP: November 26, 2001
- Genre: Turn-based strategy
- Mode: Single-player

Advanced Daisenryaku 2001 is a sequel to the World War II strategy game Advanced Daisenryaku: Europe no Arashi - Doitsu Dengeki Sakusen. This title included some bug fixes and improved graphics.

=== Dai Senryaku VII: Modern Military Tactics ===
Dai Senryaku VII: Modern Military Tactics (known simply as Daisenryaku VII in Japan) is a turn-based tactics videogame for the Microsoft Xbox, which was produced by Kemco and released in 2004 (in the United States). In December 2007 the game was ported to the PlayStation 2 by Valcon Games.

=== Daisenryaku Portable ===
Daisenryaku Portable
- Developer: Genki
- Publisher: Genki
- Series: Daisenryaku
- Platform: PlayStation Portable
- Release: JP: December 22, 2005
- Genre: Turn-based strategy
- Modes: Single-player, multiplayer

Daisenryaku Portable is a military turn-based strategy game for the PlayStation Portable published by Genki.

The game takes place on a battlefield of hexagons, upon which the player assembles an army. The aim is to capture cities and factories, in order to increase available resources. The hexagons are rendered in an isometric view with no rotation supported, but the individual attacks are rendered in 3D. The game supports use of the ad hoc wireless mode of the PlayStation Portable for two player multiplayer. The main campaign takes place in the Far East in the twenty-first century. The factions in the game are fictional versions of Japan, USA, Russia, China, South Korea, and North Korea.

==== Daisenryaku Portable 2 ====
Daisenryaku Portable 2
- Developer: Genki
- Publisher: Genki
- Series: Daisenryaku
- Platform: PlayStation Portable
- Release: JP: December 14, 2006
- Genre: Turn-based strategy
- Modes: Single-player, multiplayer

Daisenryaku Portable 2 is a military turn-based strategy game for the PlayStation Portable published by Genki. It is a sequel to Daisenryaku Portable, and is set in the Middle East. The player does not control any country, instead controlling the supranational army named "Wild Geese".

=== Moe moe 2-ji Daisen (ryaku) ===
Moe moe 2-ji Daisen (ryaku) (Taiwan) 萌萌2次大戰(略)
- Developer: SystemSoft Alpha
- Publishers: JP: SystemSoft Alpha; TWN: TWTTIME Technology Co., Ltd
- Series: Daisenryaku
- Platforms: Windows 98, PlayStation 2, PlayStation Portable, Nintendo DS, Xbox 360, i-mode
- Release: JP: 21 December 2007 (Win); JP: 27 November 2008 (PS2/PSP); TWN: 12 July 2008 (Win); JP: 18 March 2009 (Nintendo DS); JP: 18 March 2010 (Xbox 360)
- Genre: Turn-based strategy
- Mode: Multiplayer

This version of the franchise features World War II, but using mecha musume. It includes units from Japan, Germany, America, Britain, and Soviet. The game grid is hexagonal, but characters are in isometric view. The game separated into strategy and adventure mode. Player can play the Pacific Ocean (as Japanese), or the Europe (as German) campaigns. The strategy mode is played in turn-based mode.

The Deluxe version for PlayStation 2 and PSP added a new campaign for allied forces, new characters, and made a few gameplay and visual adjustments.

=== Daisenryaku Perfect: Senjō no Hasha ===
Daisenryaku Perfect: Senjō no Hasha
- Developer: SystemSoft Alpha
- Publisher: SystemSoft Alpha
- Series: Daisenryaku
- Platforms: PlayStation 3 PlayStation Portable
- Release: JP: June 2011
- Genre: Turn-based strategy
- Modes: Single-player, multiplayer

Daisenryaku Perfect: Senjō no Hasha is a turn-based military simulation set in the modern era. The player can selects from 22 countries and then becomes either an ally or attacking country.

== Localized titles ==
While the vast majority of titles in the Daisenryaku series were never released outside of Japan, a few titles were officially localized and others were partially translated by fans.

The series saw its first release in English when Working Designs partnered with SystemSoft Alpha to translate and release Iron Storm for the Sega Saturn in North America in 1996.

A second entry in English was realized when Kemco released Dai Senryaku VII: Modern Military Tactics in North America for the Microsoft Xbox in 2005. The PlayStation 2 port also saw a North American release in 2007.

The mecha musume spin-off of Daisenryaku, Moe moe 2-ji Daisen (ryaku), was translated into Chinese and released by Taiwanese publisher TWTTIME Technology Co., Ltd for the PC in 2008.

Daisenryaku Perfect 4.0 saw a worldwide release on Steam in 2018 with a partial English translation done by SystemSoft themselves. Users have criticized the translation calling it "machine translation" and many units' names remain in Japanese.

Fans have partially translated various entries in the series. Advanced Daisenryaku for the Sega Mega Drive, Advanced Daisenryaku 2001 for the Sega Dreamcast, and Daisenryaku VII for the PC all saw translations of various levels released unofficially.
