= Laplace no Ma =

1987 Japanese video game

- PC-98 cover art
- Developers: Group SNE, Vic Tokai (SFC)
- Publishers: HummingBirdSoft (PC-88, PC-98); Human Entertainment (PCE CD); Vic Tokai (SFC)
- Platforms: PC-88; PC-98; MSX; X68000; PC Engine CD; Super Famicom
- Release: PC-88, PC-98: JP: July 4, 1987; PC Engine Super CD-ROM²: JP: March 26, 1993; Super Famicom: JP: July 14, 1995
- Genre: Role-playing game
- Mode: Single-player

Laplace no Ma (Note: Japanese: ラプラスの魔; Rapurasu no Ma lit. Laplace's Demon) is a horror-themed role-playing video game released in 1987 by HummingBirdSoft for the NEC PC-8801 and NEC PC-9801. The game was also ported to various Japanese computers and later to consoles with Super Famicom and PC Engine Super CD-ROM². It became the first part of the Gōsuto Hantā series which includes both Kurokishi no Kamen (1994), Paracelsus no Maken (1994), and Gōsuto Hantā Arukeringa no Ma Umi (2020).

== Gameplay ==
Laplace no Ma is a dungeon crawler-styled role-playing video game (RPG). Dungeon crawlers generally involve players running navigating through enclosed labyrinthine environments, fighting against enemies, collecting items and money, solving puzzles, and unlocking doors to progress. The game was a horror-themed RPG at a time when the genre was predominantly set in fantasy-based worlds.

== Development and release ==
Laplace no Ma was Hitoshi Yasuda first game he made and the first he made for Group SNE. He said in an interview with Login that when making the game he said there was a trend of splatter film-styled works and wanted to make a game with a more "haunted house" style. He noted that even outside Japan, there were few horror-oriented RPGs as well as tabletop ones outside of computers such as Call of Cthulhu, but wanted to make a more original title.

Laplace no Ma was first released in July 4, 1987 for NEC PC-88 and PC-98 computers. It received several ports to other computers such as the MSX and X68000 and consoles like the PC Engine Super CD-ROM² and Super Famicom. All of these releases were exclusively released to the Japanese market.

Scenario writer for the game Keiko Shimomura said that the first thing they wanted to do with the console versions was the lower the difficulty of the original game. While originally scheduled for August 10, 1993, Laplace no Ma was released for the Super Famicom in Japan on July 14, 1995. Famicom Tsūshin wrote in June 1993 that the Super Famicom port of Laplace no Ma was at 75% completion. Yasuda described the Super Famicom version as a complete remake of the original game. The Super Famicom version features all new maps than any previously released version. A fan translation of the Super Famicom version was released in 2001 but was removed after the translator felt it did not meet their own quality standards. A new English fan translation was released in 2018.

== Reception and legacy ==
Reception

Review scores
Publication	Score
Dengeki PC Engine	70/100, 45/100, 75/100, 90/100 (PCE-CD)
Famicom Tsūshin	7/10, 7/10, 7/10, 7/10 (PCE-CD) 8/10, 7/10, 6/10, 5/10 (SFC)

During the development of the Super Famicom version, Yasuda was developing a follow-up to the original game titled Parakerususu no Ma Ken (Note: パラケルススの魔剣 lit.Paracelsus' Magic Sword).

In a retrospective review in Denfaminico Gamer, a reviewer found the game to be difficult as the slightest mistake could lead to a game over. They commented that the visuals in the game did not change much and that it had the vagueness that was like other games of the era where gaining bonus experience felt like pure luck. They found the game mostly stood out for being a horror-themed RPG instead of a fantasy-themed one that dominated the market and that it had appropriately eerie sound design.

Laplace no Ma became the first game in the groups Gōsuto Hantā (Note: ゴースト ハンター lit.Ghost Hunter) series. Both Parakerususu no Ma Ken and Kurokishi no Kamen and the tabletop role-playing game Gōsuto Hantā RPG (Note: ゴーストハンターRPG lit.Ghost Hunter RPG) were released in 1994. While remakes of games and novels were released, there was no new Gōsuto Hantā video game until Gōsuto Hantā Arukeringa no Ma Umi (Note: ゴーストハンター アルケリンガの魔海 lit.Ghost Hunter: The Demon Sea of Alkerinaga) released on June 22, 2020. The game is not an RPG, but a hidden object game for smartphones. It was developed by Yasuda and the original author and illustrator of the first game Hiroshi.
