= SystemSoft Alpha =

Japanese software development company

SystemSoft Beta Corporation
- Industry: Video games
- Founded: April 1, 1999; 27 years ago (as SystemSoft Alpha)
- Headquarters: Hakata, Fukuoka, Japan
- Products: Daisenryaku; Master of Monsters
- Website: www.ss-beta.co.jp

SystemSoft Beta Corporation (Japanese: 株式会社システムソフト・ベータ, Hepburn: Kabushiki-gaisha Shisutemu Sofuto Beeta), formerly known as SystemSoft Alpha Corporation, is a Japanese software development company.

Formerly just "SystemSoft", they have a long series of mainly military strategic simulation games (generally hex-based) popular in the Japan market. Notable among these are the many Daisenryaku and Master of Monsters series games that have been ported to multiple platforms from PCs to consoles. It has produced many wargames that are from the perspective of the Japanese Military, circa World War II. These games fill a niche in the hex wargaming market that Japanese Military enthusiasts cannot expect from Western game developers who often portray the Japanese as the "enemy" in games, if at all. Similarly, if less controversial, is the guaranteed inclusion of the Japanese Self Defense Forces in modern wargames like the Daisenryaku series.

== History ==
In 1998, SystemSoft spun off their video game business into SystemSoft Production. In 1999, Alpha Shock was founded, and SystemSoft invested 25.1% of the initial capital. In 2001, SystemSoft sold all investments of Alpha Shock, and they transferred the video game business from SystemSoft Production to Alpha Shock. Alpha Shock were renamed to SystemSoft Alpha, although they are independent from SystemSoft. The main website for the game division, regardless of platform, is now SystemSoft Alpha, but "Alpha" still is not seen in the logo of the company on game boxes.

Only a handful of the dozens of games in their portfolio have ever been translated to make it to English-speaking markets, including two Master of Monsters games for the Sega Genesis and Sony PlayStation (Disciples of Gaia), and some of the Daisenryaku games (Iron Storm, Daisenryaku VII, Daisenryaku VII Exceed). Part of the reason for this is that the main platform for their games for almost a decade was the NEC PC-9801. However, several of their games were remakes of Infocom games for the PC-98 system. Since Infocom was an American company, these games were released to English-speaking markets first.

In 2019, the company changed the name from SystemSoft Alpha to SystemSoft Beta.

== Notable games ==
- Daisenryaku series
- Barbarossa
- Enchanter (originally developed by Infocom)
- Master of Monsters series
- Moonmist (originally developed by Infocom)
- Planetfall (originally developed by Infocom)
- Zork I (originally developed by Infocom)
