= Deep Dungeon =

Deep Dungeon (ディープダンジョン) is a series of role-playing video games developed by HummingBirdSoft. The first two installments were released on the Family Computer Disk System by Square's label Disk Original Group (DOG); the third one was released on the regular Family Computer by Square directly and the final one by Asmik.

== Games in the series ==
=== Madō Senki ===
Deep Dungeon: Madō Senki
- Developer: HummingBirdSoft
- Publisher: DOG
- Platforms: Famicom Disk System, MSX
- Release: JP: December 19, 1986
- Genre: Role-playing
- Mode: Single-player

Deep Dungeon: Madō Senki (ディープダンジョン 魔洞戦記; lit. Deep Dungeon: Demon Cave War Chronicles) is a dungeon crawler presented in a first person perspective, similar to Wizardry. Players navigate undistinguished, maze-like corridors in their bid to find the princess. The game was released exclusively in Japan, but on April 15, 2006, Deep Dungeon was unofficially translated into English.

Madō Senki is set in the town of Dorl. One day, monsters raided the town, stealing both the treasures and Princess Etna's soul. Despite the attempts of brave warriors to retrieve her soul, none have been successful.

In the dungeon, the player is given a command list. The player can choose to attack if an enemy is in the vicinity, view allocated items, escape from battle, examine the area for items, and talk if there are people nearby. The character's effectiveness in battle is largely determined by numerical values for attacking power (AP), defensive power (AC), and health (HP). These values are determined by the character's experience level (LEVEL), which raises after the character's accumulated experience (EX) reaches a certain point.

=== Reception ===
Reception

Review score
Publication	Score
Famicom Tsūshin	5/10, 5/10, 8/10, 6/10 (FDS)

In Famicom Hisshoubon one reviewer said the game lacked the fun exploration and gathering information elements of Dragon Quest, but had the same deep gameplay. The second reviewer said that more hardcore players might complain about the lack of items or variety of spells or fun characters, they recommend it for beginners new to the genre.

In Famicom Tsūshin two reviewers compared it to Wizardry with one saying that it was a miniature version of that game and another saying "for better and worse", the games were similar. While one reviewer said it lacked originality and another said the game felt a bit empty another said its a game players would not get bored of. One reviewer complimented the extra features such as being able to turn off the games music allowing them to play after hours.

=== Yūshi no Monshō ===
Yūshi no Monshō: Deep Dungeon
- Developer: HummingBirdSoft
- Publishers: DOG (Famicom Disk System); Scap Trust (MSX)
- Platforms: Disk System, MSX (as Deep Dungeon II)
- Release: JP: May 30, 1987
- Genre: Role-playing video game
- Mode: Single-player

Yūshi no Monshō: Deep Dungeon (勇士の紋章 ディープダンジョン; lit. The Crest of the Hero: Deep Dungeon), also called Deep Dungeon II: Yūshi no Monshō, is the second installment of the Deep Dungeon series. According to Square Enix, it was the first 3D dungeon crawler RPG for the Famicom console. In this game, the villain Ruu has returned. The player will need to explore an eight floor tower (consisting of four ground floors and four underground floors) to find and defeat him. Battles were much quicker in this sequel. The first game could get slow because of the very high miss rate for the player and the enemies. It also has a much higher encounter rate, and the player is likely to be attacked within seconds if they stand still. A new feature in this game is that if the player has a significantly higher level than the enemies for the current floor, they will not be attacked while randomly walking through the hallways (although they will still be attacked when they step on predetermined spaces on the map). When the player gains an experience level, they are given attribute points to allocate to their character's stats as they wish (unlike most console RPGs of the era, where stat upgrades are usually predetermined or randomized beyond the player's control).

=== Yūshi heno Tabi ===
Deep Dungeon III: Yūshi heno Tabi
- Developer: HummingBirdSoft
- Publisher: Square
- Composer: Kazuya Matsushita
- Platform: Family Computer
- Release: JP: May 13, 1988
- Genre: Role-playing video game
- Mode: Single-player

Deep Dungeon III: Yūshi he no Tabi (ディープダンジョンIII 勇士への旅; lit. Deep Dungeon III: The Journey to the Hero) is the third installment in the Deep Dungeon series and the first to be released on the Famicom. This is the first Deep Dungeon title to offer the player a world to explore spanning multiple dungeons and many towns. It also allows the player to create their own party with up to three companions in addition to the hero character. The player can choose between a ranger, a magician and a priest for each character. Though the player can dismiss a character once the game has started, they will only be able to replace that character if they meet another pre-created playable character in one of the dungeons. The game however will still end as soon as the protagonist "swordsman" character is defeated. This game retains the player-adjustable level-up stats from the first game, as well as the feature that removes randomized encounters if the player is at a significantly higher experience level than needed for their current location. One exclusive feature of this game is that sometimes the player character will fumble (remove) their equipped weapon, wasting that character's turn. If the player wishes to re-arm their weapon, it will use up another turn. This is the only game in the series to award the player money (Gold) when defeating enemies. All other games will force the player to re-enter maps to collect respawning chests for money or items (for resale) if they want to gold farm.

=== Kuro no Yōjutsushi ===
Deep Dungeon IV: The Black Sorcerer
- Developer: HummingBirdSoft
- Publisher: Asmik
- Platform: Family Computer
- Release: JP: April 6, 1990
- Genre: Role-playing video game
- Mode: Single-player

Deep Dungeon IV: Kuro no Yōjutsushi (ディープダンジョンIV 黒の妖術師; lit. Deep Dungeon IV: The Black Sorcerer) is the fourth and final installment in the Deep Dungeon series.

The game has removed the custom character feature of the previous game. Through this game, the player will meet up to two additional playable characters with a predetermined class. This game also reverts to the standard practice or randomizing characters' stat growth when gaining an experience level. New to this engine is that the player can learn to summon two monsters to function as a temporary additional party member for a single battle. It also removed the feature that stops random battles when the player is significantly more powerful than the enemies. The maps in this game are also much smaller (whereas the previous games used multi-floor dungeons up to 32x32 tiles, the dungeons in this game are either single floor, or multiple floors that can fit within a single 32x32 map). In this game, the player can accept "requests" from the non-player characters. These are optional tasks that will reward the player with bonus items, experience or money when finished.
