= Shard of Spring =

1986 video game

- Cover art by Joe Chiodo (revised)
- Developer: TX Digital Illusions
- Publisher: Strategic Simulations
- Designers: Craig Roth; David Stark
- Platforms: Apple II, Commodore 64, MS-DOS
- Release: 1986
- Genre: Role-playing
- Mode: Single-player

Shard of Spring is a role-playing video game developed by TX Digital Illusions and published by Strategic Simulations for the Apple II, Commodore 64, and MS-DOS. Shard of Spring tells the story of a group of adventurers hired to retrieve the titular magical item stolen by a power-hungry evil witch. The game was generally well received upon its release and was followed by a sequel, Demon's Winter, in 1988.

== Gameplay ==
The player's party in Shard of Spring can be made up of at least two human, dwarf, elf, troll or gnome adventurers, each of whom can be either a warrior or a wizard (both classes have very different set of traits to assign points to). The game's game world system is displayed in the top-down view, and the combat system for the fights (mostly random encounters) is similar to turn-based tactical war games. Its spell system is based on five elements: fire, metal, wind, ice and spirit.

== Plot ==
For two centuries, a small island of Ymros enjoyed eternal springtime thanks to the enchanted Shard of Spring, a piece of the long-lost legendary Life Stone. However, three years ago, the land's peace was shattered when a mysterious Siriadne arrived to Ymros and stole the Shard. With the threat of the Shard's destruction, the selfish sorceress and her minions now extort a ruinous and ever-increasing tribute from the people of Ymros. Anyone who might put an end to her tyranny will be a hero for all time to come. The aim of the game is to gain access to Siriadne's castle (which is encircled by a magical force field) and defeat her. The player needs to kill Siriadne's chief followers Devon the Destroyer, Ralith (in Ralith's Tower) and Edrin (in Edrin's Dungeon) so the party can storm Siriadne's Fortress. Siriadne herself transforms into a dragon for the final battle. After the player's victory, the game ends in a cryptic way.

== Publication history ==
Shard of Spring was created by Craig Roth and David Stark and released by SSI in 1986 with art direction by Louis Hsu Saekow, and art and graphic design by Saekow, Kathryn J. Lee, and David Boudreau. Joseph Chiodo created the box cover art.

The sequel Demon's Winter was created by the same team and published by SSI in 1988.

== Reception ==
SSI sold 11,942 copies of Shard of Spring in North America. The game was generally well received upon its release.

According to QuestBusters, "anyone completely burned out on the 'seek and slay' scenario should look elsewhere," but "Phantasie fans who found Wizard's Crown too complex will appreciate this one, which combines the best elements of each - easily making it SSI's best game since the original Phantasie."

Scorpia of Computer Gaming World gave the game a positive review in 1986, noting it as a good hack and slash type. The graphics were considered well-done, even in monochrome, but the reviewer felt leveling in the later part of the game went far too slowly. In 1993, she called Shard of Spring "a typical hack-and-slash romp" but "not bad for its type, and better than some".

On the other hand, Philippa Irving in Zzap!64 criticized the game's "lacklustre" presentation (55%) and "dull" graphics 65%, but nevertheless gave Shard of Spring a high overall rating of 88%, calling it "just short of brilliant" due to its "absorbing, tantalizing, and satisfying" playability.

Rick Teverbaugh of RUN also gave it a positive review, even as he opined it was not "exactly a frontrunner in the Game of the Year voting."

Mark Patters of Commodore User gave Shard of Spring a rating of 6/10.

In Issue 79 of Space Gamer/Fantasy Gamer, Tim Bailey commented "if you have the money to spare, and Ultima IV is not available, and you can't wait, Shard of Spring is a good, but inferior imitation."

In Issue 5 of Gateways, Thomas and Cynthia Than commented "While this is not a drastically new idea, it is well executed and the graphics are both interesting to look at and easy on the eyes." The Thans felt that the game's biggest asset was its multiple attack feature. However, they didn't like using the keyboard during combat, noting, "Due to the multi-attack ability, you are often hitting many buttons per character per round in a relatively tedious pattern." Despite this, the Thans concluded, "The game is paced, planned and has a smooth feel to it. Playing it was a challenge."

According to a retrospective review by John Gorenfeld in Allgame, "unlike Wizard's Crown, SSI's RPG Shard of Spring has none of the company's characteristic war game detail. In fact, it feels like a low-rent version of Ultima III, with the latter's simple tactical combat, but less atmosphere."

Computist reported that the game had a balance problem because the players received too few experience points for their victories; this problem was fixed in the sequel.
