= Demon's Winter =

1988 video game

- Developer: Strategic Simulations
- Publisher: Strategic Simulations
- Designers: Craig Roth; David Stark
- Platforms: Amiga, Apple II, Atari ST, Commodore 64, MS-DOS
- Release: August 1988
- Genre: Role-playing
- Mode: Single-player

Demon's Winter is a role-playing video game developed and published by Strategic Simulations in 1988. It is a sequel to SSI's 1986 Shard of Spring, set two hundred years after the events of the original, featuring a game world 32-times the size of the previous one.

== Plot ==
The evil sorceress Siriadne has been slain, the Shard of Spring has been recovered, and peace and prosperity returned to the fantasy island of Ymros. Two centuries later, however, great numbers of aggressive monsters have suddenly appeared, devastating the region and its inhabitants. A party of five adventurers must band together in order to combat this threat, starting only with meager skills and supplies after a kobold attack on the now-ruined village of Ildryn. Ultimately, they must uncover the source of the beasts, as well as the unnatural cold that plagues the land, and ultimately put an end to both.

== Reception ==
Computer Gaming World's Scorpia in 1988 described Demon's Winter as a general improvement over Shard of Spring, although not without its own flaws. Combat was described as "uneven", with opponents either being trivial or quite difficult to defeat, while mapping was noted as being quite difficult in some areas. On the other hand, the addition of new classes and changes to the skill system were received favorably. In 1993 she stated that Demon's Winter had "many improvements over the previous game and an interesting plot, although combat is not as balanced as it could be", and approved of the "refreshing" ending. ST/Amiga Format in 1989 felt that the game took several steps forward to enhance the genre, but not without suffering in presentation. The reviewer concluded, "Unfortunately so much has been done to make the game play well that the appearance has fallen by the wayside, it looks and sounds awful which is a terrible shame, because Demon’s Winter is one of the best computer role-playing games to date." This earned the title an overall grade of 68%. Compute! agreed, calling the game "unsatisfactory" because of graphics and gameplay.
