= Iron Storm (1995 video game) =

- Developer: Sega
- Publishers: JP: Sega; NA: Working Designs
- Series: Daisenryaku
- Platform: Sega Saturn
- Release: JP: September 22, 1995; NA: May 8, 1996
- Genre: Turn-based strategy
- Modes: Single-player, multiplayer

Iron Storm, originally released in Japan as World Advanced Daisenryaku: Koutetsu no Senpuu, (Note: (Japanese: ワールドアドバンスド大戦略 〜鋼鉄の戦風〜)) is a 1995 turn-based strategy video game for the Sega Saturn. It was released in 1996 in North America. It is part of the Daisenryaku series which was developed and published by Sega.

== Story ==
Iron Storm is a strategy game that takes place within the context of World War II. The game's general premise is to allow players to pick a side (United States, Nazi Germany, or Imperial Japan) and then work their way across several battles within the war. The game takes place in both the Pacific Theatre and European Theatres. In addition, if a player wins certain battles then the path of the war changes. For example, Nazi Germany winning the Battle of Britain will allow for an eventual invasion of America, as will Japan defeating the United States at the Battle of Midway.

== Gameplay ==
During battles in campaign mode, the player mobilizes a large variety of customizable units (tanks, aircraft, submarines, and warships) across a hexagon-shaped grid in order to defeat the opposing Allied or Axis forces controlled by the game's AI. In addition, as time progresses players can upgrade individual units either based on experience levels or as a blanket technology upgrade. Experimental weaponry is used in some later battles, including some German jet aircraft like the Messerschmitt Me 262. The map system itself is static, but real-time 3-D animations are used to recreate encounters between various types of units, an option that can also be toggled off.

== Release ==
The game's North American publisher, Working Designs, donated 50 cents of every copy sold to the National Holocaust Museum in Washington, D.C.

== Reception ==
Reception

Review scores
Publication	Score
AllGame	4/5
Electronic Gaming Monthly	8/10
Next Generation	4/5

Iron Storm was a minor hit in Japan.

The game was positively received by critics. Electronic Gaming Monthly gave the game an 8 out of 10, praising the ability to view the outcome of each battle in cinematic view and the use of experience points. A Next Generation critic found that the cinematic sequences at least initially dispel the perception of strategy games as "dry", and noted that they can be turned off once their novelty fades and they become simply a means of slowing down the gameplay. He was pleased that the gameplay is more straightforward and simple than other offerings in the genre such as P.T.O. II, and found the game overall "ranks with the best of its strategy companions." GamePro's Scary Larry also found the game more accessible than other war simulators. He complimented the ability to name the commander for each country, the numerous unit types, the sounds, and the brutal depiction of warfare. He called the game "the best war sim to date ... and one of the most fun sims ever."

Electronic Gaming Monthly named Iron Storm a runner-up for Strategy Game of the Year (behind Dragon Force).
