= HummingBirdSoft =

Japanese video game developer

- Industry: Video games
- Founded: 1982
- Fate: Defunct
- Headquarters: Japan

HummingBirdSoft (ハミングバードソフト) was a Japanese video game developer. The company was established in 1982 as a real estate agent, but in 1983 began to develop video games. The company heavily participated in the Disk Original Group, a collective publishing house for Famicom Disk System games headed by Square. Many of HummingBirdSoft's games are either traditional role-playing video games or adventure games, although they also developed a couple of pinball video games. While none of their games were published in North America, some have been unofficially translated by fans.
