= List of Nihon Falcom video games =

Nihon Falcom logo

Nihon Falcom is a Japanese video game developer and publisher founded in 1981. Their works include the Ys, Dragon Slayer, The Legend of Heroes, and Trails series. While Falcom has actively developed video games since their inception, their games were not consistently localized and published until the 2010s. The company originally focused on developing games for Japanese personal computers. In the 2000s, the company moved into developing games for Sony's PlayStation brand, particularly the PlayStation Portable, while continuing development on PCs on Windows, to reach a broader demographic. The move was internally seen as a success, and broadened their fanbase in Western territories, leading the company to put greater emphasis into English translations and releases of their games in the 2010s. Since the 2010s, the company generally releases one game per year. In November 2021, the company announced it started developing games for the Nintendo Switch in-house, following a period of Switch ports and remasters of their games handled by other companies.

== Video games ==
List of games
Year	Title	System(s)	JP	NA	EU	Ref.
1982	Galactic Wars	PC-8801	Yes			
1983	Super Mahjong	Sharp X1	Yes			
1983	Computer the Golf	PC-8801	Yes			
1983	Horror House	PC-8801	Yes			
1983	Private Stripper	PC-8801, PC-9801, FM-7	Yes			
1983	Panorama Toh	PC-8801	Yes			
1983	Horror House Part-II	PC-8801	Yes			
1984	Monster House	Sharp MZ	Yes			
1984	Demon's Ring	PC-8801, FM-7, PC-9801	Yes			
1984	Asteka	PC-8801, FM-7, PC-9801	Yes			
1984	Escape from Twilight Zone	FM-7	Yes			
1984	Dragon Slayer	PC-8801, FM-7, Sharp X1, MSX	Yes			
1985	Dragon Slayer II: Xanadu	Sharp X1, PC-8801, FM-7, PC-9801, MSX, MSX 2	Yes			
1986	Xanadu Scenario II	PC-8801, FM-7, PC-9801	Yes			
1986	Dragon Slayer Jr: Romancia	Sharp X1, PC-8801, PC-9801, MSX, MSX 2	Yes			
1986	Tombs & Treasure	Sharp X1, PC-8801, PC-9801, FM-7, MSX 2	Yes	Yes		
1987	Ys I	PC-8801, Sharp X1, PC-9801, FM-7, MSX2, Master System, Famicom	Yes	Yes	Yes	
1987	Dragon Slayer IV - Drasle Family	MSX, MSX2, Famicom	Yes			
1987	Sorcerian	PC-8801, PC-9801, Sharp X1, MSX2, MS-DOS, PC Engine CD, Sega Genesis	Yes	Yes		
1988	Ys II	PC-8801, PC-9801, FM-7, Sharp X1, MSX2, Famicom	Yes			
1989	Legacy of the Wizard	Nintendo Entertainment System	Yes	Yes		
1989	Star Trader	PC-8801, PC-9801	Yes			
1989	Ys III: Wanderers from Ys	PC-8801, PC-9801, MSX2, Famicom, Sega Genesis, Super NES, X68000, TurboGrafx-CD	Yes	Yes		
1989	Dragon Slayer: The Legend of Heroes	PC-8801, PC-9801, FM Towns, MSX2 Sega Genesis, Super NES, TurboGrafx-CD, Windows	Yes	Yes		
1990	Dinosaur	PC-8801, PC-9801, FM Towns	Yes			
1991	Lord Monarch	PC-9801, FM Towns	Yes			
1991	Brandish	PC-9801, FM Towns, Super NES, PC Engine CD	Yes	Yes		
1991	Popful Mail	PC-8801, PC-9801, Super NES, Sega CD, PC Engine CD	Yes	Yes		
1992	Dragon Slayer: The Legend of Heroes II	PC-8801, PC-9801, Sega Genesis, Super NES, PC Engine CD	Yes			
1993	Brandish 2: The Planet Buster	PC-9801, Super NES	Yes			
1994	The Legend of Xanadu	PC Engine CD, Windows	Yes			
1994	The Legend of Heroes III: The White Witch	PC-9801, Sega Saturn, PlayStation, Windows, PlayStation Portable	Yes	Yes		
1994	Brandish 3: Spirit of Balcan	PC-9801	Yes			
1994	Revival Xanadu	PC-9801	Yes			
1995	The Legend of Xanadu II	PC Engine CD, Windows	Yes			
1995	Revival Xanadu II Remix	PC-9801	Yes			
1995	Ys V: Lost Kefin, Kingdom of Sand	Super NES	Yes			
1996	The Legend of Heroes IV: A Tear of Vermilion	PC-9801, PlayStation, Windows, PlayStation Portable	Yes	Yes		
1996	Lord Monarch Original	Windows	Yes			
1996	Brandish VT	PC-9801	Yes			
1997	Lord Monarch First	Windows	Yes			
1997	Lord Monarch Pro	Windows	Yes			
1997	Sorcerian Forever	Windows	Yes			
1997	Vantage Master	Windows	Yes			
1998	Ys I Eternal	Windows	Yes			
1998	Vantage Master V2	Windows	Yes	Yes		
1998	Monarch Monarch	Windows	Yes			
1999	Brandish 4	Windows	Yes			
1999	The Legend of Heroes V: Cagesong of the Ocean	Windows, PlayStation Portable	Yes	Yes		
2000	Ys II Eternal	Windows	Yes			
2000	Sorcerian Original	Windows	Yes			
2001	Ys I & II Complete	Windows, PlayStation Portable, PlayStation 2, Nintendo DS, iOS, Android	Yes	Yes	Yes	
2001	Zwei: The Arges Adventure	Windows, PlayStation Portable, PlayStation 2	Yes	Yes	Yes	
2002	VM Japan	Windows	Yes			
2002	Dinosaur Resurrection	Windows	Yes			
2003	Ys VI: The Ark of Napishtim	Windows, PlayStation 2, PlayStation Portable, iOS, Android	Yes	Yes	Yes	
2004	The Legend of Heroes: Trails in the Sky	Windows, PlayStation Portable, PlayStation Vita, PlayStation 3	Yes	Yes	Yes	
2004	Gurumin	Windows, PlayStation Portable, Nintendo 3DS	Yes	Yes	Yes	
2005	Rinne	Windows	Yes			
2005	Ys: The Oath in Felghana	Windows, PlayStation Portable, PlayStation 4, PlayStation 5, Nintendo Switch	Yes	Yes	Yes	
2005	Xanadu Next	Windows, N-Gage	Yes	Yes	Yes	
2006	The Legend of Heroes: Trails in the Sky SC	Windows, PlayStation Portable, PlayStation Vita, PlayStation 3	Yes	Yes	Yes	
2006	Ys Origin	Windows, PlayStation Vita, PlayStation 4, Nintendo Switch, Xbox One	Yes	Yes	Yes	
2007	The Legend of Heroes: Trails in the Sky the 3rd	Windows, PlayStation Portable, PlayStation Vita, PlayStation 3	Yes	Yes	Yes	
2008	Vantage Master Portable	PlayStation Portable	Yes			
2008	Zwei: The Ilvard Insurrection	Windows	Yes	Yes	Yes	
2009	Brandish: The Dark Revenant	PlayStation Portable	Yes	Yes	Yes	
2009	Ys I & II Chronicles	PlayStation Portable, Windows, iOS, Android	Yes	Yes	Yes	
2009	Ys Seven	PlayStation Portable, Windows	Yes	Yes	Yes	
2010	Ys vs. Trails in the Sky	PlayStation Portable, Windows, Nintendo Switch, PlayStation 4, PlayStation 5	Yes	Yes	Yes	
2010	The Legend of Heroes: Trails from Zero	PlayStation Portable, Windows, PlayStation Vita, PlayStation 4, PlayStation 5, Nintendo Switch, Nintendo Switch 2	Yes	Yes	Yes	
2011	The Legend of Heroes: Trails to Azure	PlayStation Portable, Windows, PlayStation Vita, PlayStation 4, PlayStation 5, Nintendo Switch, Nintendo Switch 2	Yes	Yes	Yes	
2012	The Legend of Nayuta: Boundless Trails	PlayStation Portable, PlayStation 4, Windows, Nintendo Switch	Yes	Yes	Yes	
2012	Ys: Memories of Celceta	PlayStation Vita, Windows, PlayStation 4, Nintendo Switch	Yes	Yes	Yes	
2013	The Legend of Heroes: Trails of Cold Steel	PlayStation Vita, PlayStation 3, Windows, PlayStation 4, Nintendo Switch	Yes	Yes	Yes	
2014	The Legend of Heroes: Trails of Cold Steel II	PlayStation Vita, PlayStation 3, Windows, PlayStation 4, Nintendo Switch	Yes	Yes	Yes	
2015	Tokyo Xanadu	PlayStation Vita, PlayStation 4, Windows, Nintendo Switch	Yes	Yes	Yes	
2016	Ys VIII: Lacrimosa of Dana	PlayStation Vita, PlayStation 4, Windows, Nintendo Switch, PlayStation 5	Yes	Yes	Yes	
2017	The Legend of Heroes: Trails of Cold Steel III	PlayStation 4, Nintendo Switch, Windows, PlayStation 5	Yes	Yes	Yes	
2018	The Legend of Heroes: Trails of Cold Steel IV	PlayStation 4, Nintendo Switch, Windows, PlayStation 5	Yes	Yes	Yes	
2019	Ys IX: Monstrum Nox	PlayStation 4, Windows, Nintendo Switch, PlayStation 5	Yes	Yes	Yes	
2020	The Legend of Heroes: Trails into Reverie	PlayStation 4, Nintendo Switch, Windows, PlayStation 5	Yes	Yes	Yes	
2021	The Legend of Heroes: Trails Through Daybreak	PlayStation 4, PlayStation 5, Windows, Nintendo Switch	Yes	Yes	Yes	
2022	The Legend of Heroes: Trails Through Daybreak II	PlayStation 4, PlayStation 5, Windows, Nintendo Switch	Yes	Yes	Yes	
2023	Ys X: Nordics	PlayStation 4, PlayStation 5, Nintendo Switch, Windows	Yes	Yes	Yes	
2024	The Legend of Heroes: Trails Beyond the Horizon	PlayStation 4, PlayStation 5, Windows, Nintendo Switch, Nintendo Switch 2	Yes	Yes	Yes	
2025	Ys X: Proud Nordics	Nintendo Switch 2, PlayStation 5, Windows	Yes	Yes	Yes	
2025	Trails in the Sky 1st Chapter	Nintendo Switch, Nintendo Switch 2, PlayStation 5, Windows	Yes	Yes	Yes	
2026	Kyoto Xanadu	Nintendo Switch, Nintendo Switch 2, PlayStation 5, Windows	Yes	Scheduled	Scheduled	
2026	Trails in the Sky 2nd Chapter	Nintendo Switch, Nintendo Switch 2, PlayStation 5, Windows	Yes	Yes	Yes	

== See also ==
- Faxanadu - a game in the Xanadu series that was outsourced to Hudson Soft.
- Ys IV's original releases were outsourced to other companies, and not developed by Falcom. This includes Ys IV: The Dawn of Ys, developed by Hudson Soft for the PC Engine in 1993, Ys IV: Mask of the Sun by Tonkin House for the Super Famicom, and Ys IV: Mask of the Sun – A New Theory by Taito for the PlayStation 2. The only version of Ys IV to be developed by Falcom was Ys: Memories of Celceta.
- Ys Strategy - a 2006 entry into Falcom's Ys series outsourced to another development team for release on the Nintendo DS.
