= List of Ys media =

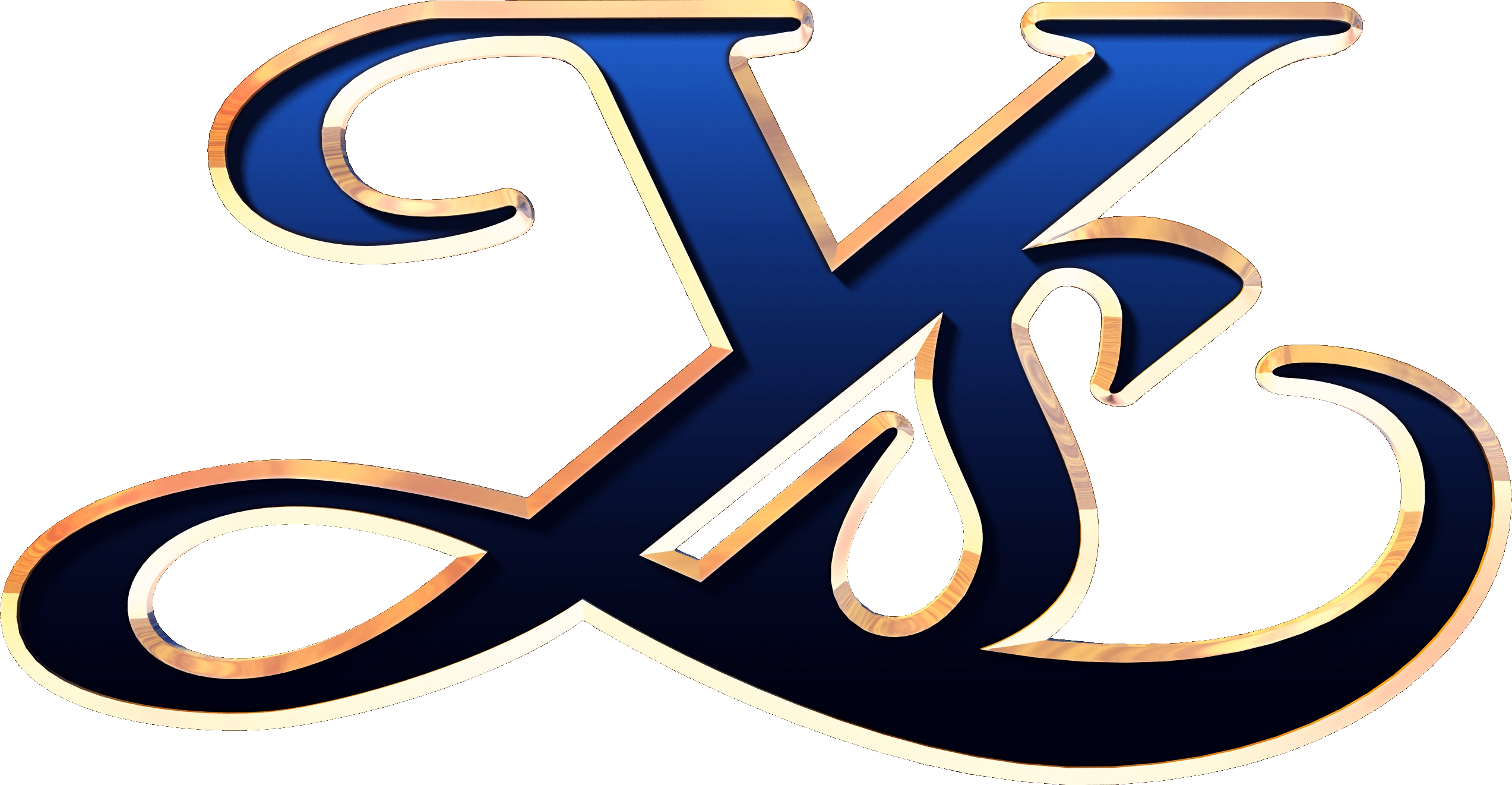
Logo of the Ys series

Ys is a Japanese role-playing video game series and one of Nihon Falcom's flagship franchises. The series started on the PC-8801 in 1987. The games take place in a fictional world with substantial geographical resemblance to Earth, and chronicle the adventures of Adol Christin, a red-haired swordsman, and his companions. Two separate OVA anime series of Ys have also been released, as well as many soundtracks featuring the game's music.

== Video games ==
=== Main series ===
Title	Original release date		
Title	Japan	North America	PAL region
Ys I	June 21, 1987	1988 (Master System)	1988 (Master System)
Notes: Originally released on PC-8801, later ported to X1 (1987), PC-9801 (1987), FM-7 (1987), MSX2 (1987), Famicom (1988), Master System (1988), MS-DOS (1989), X68000 (1991)
Ys II	June 24, 1988	none	none
Notes: Originally released on PC-8801 and PC-9801, later ported to FM-7 (1988), X1 (1988), MSX2 (1988), Famicom (1990)
Ys III: Wanderers from Ys	July 28, 1989	1991 (TurboGrafx-CD)	none
Notes: Originally released on PC-8801 and PC-9801, later ported to MSX2 (1989), X68000 (1990), TurboGrafx-CD (1991), SNES (1991), Famicom (1991), Sega Genesis (1991), PlayStation 2 (2005)
Ys IV: Mask of the Sun	November 19, 1993	none	none
Notes: Originally released on Super Famicom, later ported to PlayStation 2 (2005), Mobile (2006)
Ys V: Lost Kefin, Kingdom of Sand	December 29, 1995	none	none
Notes: Originally released on Super Famicom, later ported to PlayStation 2 (2006); Re-released same year as an "Expert" edition
Ys VI: The Ark of Napishtim	September 27, 2003	February 22, 2005 (PlayStation 2)	September 16, 2005 (PlayStation 2)
Notes: Originally released on Windows, later ported to PlayStation 2 (2005), Mobile (2005), PlayStation Portable (2006)
Ys Origin	December 21, 2006	May 31, 2012	May 31, 2012
Notes: Originally released on Windows, later ported to PlayStation 4 (2017), PlayStation Vita (2017), Xbox One (2018), Nintendo Switch (2020); It was only released digitally in North America and Europe.
Ys Seven	September 16, 2009	August 17, 2010	December 29, 2010
Notes: Originally released on PlayStation Portable, later ported to Windows (2012); It was only released digitally in Europe
Ys VIII: Lacrimosa of Dana	July 21, 2016	September 12, 2017	September 15, 2017
Notes: Originally released on PlayStation Vita, later ported to PlayStation 4 (2017), Windows (2018), Nintendo Switch (2018), Google Stadia (2021), PlayStation 5 (2022)
Ys IX: Monstrum Nox	September 26, 2019	February 2, 2021	February 5, 2021
Notes: Originally released on PlayStation 4, later ported to Google Stadia (2021), Windows (2021), Nintendo Switch (2021), PlayStation 5 (2023)
Ys X: Nordics	September 28, 2023	October 25, 2024	October 25, 2024
Notes: Originally released on Nintendo Switch, PlayStation 4, PlayStation 5 and Windows, later ported to Nintendo Switch 2 (2025)

=== Spin-offs ===
Title	Original release date		
Title	Japan	North America	PAL region
Ys IV: The Dawn of Ys	December 22, 1993	none	none
Notes: Released on PC Engine CD-ROM²; Developed by Hudson Soft
Ys Strategy	March 23, 2006	none	December 7, 2006
Notes: Released on Nintendo DS; Developed by Future Creates
Ys Online: The Call of Solum	December 25, 2009	none	2009
Notes: Released on Windows; Online MMORPG developed by Falcom and released by CJ Internet in 2007 in Korea and was in open-beta in Japan; takes place a couple centuries after Ys VI: The Ark of Napishtim.; An English version was available in Europe in January 2009 for beta-testing, before being shut down in November the same year. The servers were shut down in China and Korea in 2010, in Japan in October 2011, and in Taiwan in October 2012.
Ys vs. Trails in the Sky	July 29, 2010	none	none
Notes: Released as Ys vs. Sora no Kiseki: Alternative Saga only in Japan for the PlayStation Portable; Later ported to Nintendo Switch, PlayStation 4, PlayStation 5 and Windows (2025); Fighting game crossover featuring characters from Falcom's Ys and Trails series
Ys Online: The Ark of Napishtim	July 20, 2021	August 30, 2022	August 30, 2022
Notes: Released on Android and iOS; Free-to-play MMORPG based on Ys VI: The Ark of Napishtim

=== Remakes ===
Title	Original release date		
Title	Japan	North America	PAL region
Ys I & II	December 21, 1989	1990	February 23, 2011 (PlayStation Portable)
Notes: Released on TurboGrafx-CD; Developed by Alfa System; Also available on TurboDuo (1992), Windows (1997), PlayStation 2 (2003), Nintendo DS (2008), PlayStation Portable (2009), Android (2015), iOS (2015), X68000 (2021); PC remakes known as Ys Eternal and later Ys I Complete. Japan-only Nintendo DS remake known as Ys: The Vanished Omen.; Pack-in game for TTi's TurboDuo console was a re-pressing of the TurboGrafx-CD version, but with new silk-screening on the CD-ROM (i.e. the TG-CD logo was replaced by the new "TurboDuo" logo, among other changes).; The PC Complete version was re-released as "Cheap Edition" in 2005.; A PlayStation 2 "Limited Edition" was also released.; The Nintendo DS version was a North American exclusive compilation, as it was released as separate games in Japan.; The PlayStation Portable version is based on the first remake for the 2001 Windows version
Ys: The Oath in Felghana	July 4, 2005	November 2, 2010 (PlayStation Portable)	January 27, 2011 (PlayStation Portable)
Notes: Released on Windows; Developed by Nihon Falcom; Also available on Mobile (2005), PlayStation Portable (2010), Nintendo Switch (2023), PlayStation 4 (2024), PlayStation 5 (2024); Ys: The Oath in Felghana is a "re-imagined" remake of Ys III: Wanderers from Ys, intended largely to make the game's events fit in better with the overarching plot threads introduced in later games.
Ys: Memories of Celceta	September 27, 2012	November 26, 2013	February 21, 2014
Notes: Released on PlayStation Vita; Developed by Nihon Falcom; Also available on Windows (2015), PlayStation 4 (2020), Nintendo Switch (2025); Ys: Memories of Celceta, released in Japan as Ys: Foliage Ocean in Celceta, is a "re-imagined" remake of Ys IV, intended largely to make the game's events fit in better with the overarching plot threads introduced in later games.

== Other media ==
Game	Details
Ys: Book One & Book Two 1989–1991 – anime	Notes: Follows the plot of Ys I
Ys: Castle in the Heavens 1992–1993 – anime	Notes: Loosely follows the plot of Ys II
Ys: Age of Heroes October 1, 2024 – tabletop game	Notes: Designed by Promethium Books
