= YS =

Ys is a mythical sunken city in Brittany, France.

Ys, YS or ys may also refer to:

== Arts and entertainment ==
=== Games and anime ===
- Ys (series), a video game series
- Ys I, or simply Ys, the first game in the series
- Ys (OVA), anime series based on the first two Ys video games
- Other Ys media

=== Music ===
- ¥$, a hip-hop supergroup composed of Kanye West and Ty Dolla Sign
- Ys (album), a 2006 album by Joanna Newsom
- Ys, a 1972 album by Neapolitan progressive rock band Il Balletto di Bronzo
- "Ys", a 1972 song by Alan Stivell from Renaissance of the Celtic Harp

=== Other media ===
- Your Sinclair, a British computer magazine

== Businesses and organizations ==
- Confederation of Vocational Unions, abbreviated YS in Norwegian
- Esat Young Scientist and Technology Exhibition, an Irish annual school students' science competition
- Proteus Airlines (IATA airline code YS)
- Régional (IATA airline code YS)
- Youngstown and Southeastern Railroad (reporting mark YS)

== People ==
- Etienne Ys (born 1962), Netherlands Antilles politician
- Kim Young-sam, 14th president of Republic of Korea

== Other ==
- Y.S. River, in the island of Jamaica
- Yoctosecond, or ys, a unit of time equal to 10^{−24} seconds
- Yottasecond, or Ys, a unit of time equal to 10^{24} seconds
- A US Navy hull classification symbol: Stevedoring barge (YS)
- Y.S., abbreviation for yimakh shemo

== See also ==
- YSS (disambiguation)
- Y (disambiguation) for the singular of Ys
