= Popful Mail =

1991 video game

- PC-8801 cover art
- Developer: Nihon Falcom (Note: Ported to Sega CD by Sega Falcom, PC Engine Super CD-ROM² by HuneX, and mobile phones by Bothtec.)
- Publishers: Nihon Falcom: Sega CD; JP: Sega; NA: Working Designs; NEC Home Electronics (PCE SCD-ROM²); Bothtec (mobile phones)
- Director: Yoshio Kiya
- Producer: Masayuki Kato
- Programmer: Jun Nagashima
- Artists: Hiroyuki Imai; Kunihiko Tanaka; Yuichi Shiota
- Composers: Atsushi Shirakawa; Mieko Ishikawa
- Platforms: PC-8801, PC-9801, Sega CD, Super Famicom, PC Engine Super CD-ROM², Mobile phone
- Release: December 20, 1991: PC-8801; JP: December 20, 1991 PC-9801; JP: May 22, 1992 Sega CD; JP: April 1, 1994; NA: February 23, 1995 Super Famicom; JP: June 10, 1994 PC Engine Super CD-ROM²; JP: August 12, 1994 Mobile phone; JP: September 9, 2003
- Genres: Action-adventure, platform
- Mode: Single-player

Popful Mail: Magical Fantasy Adventure (Note: Japanese: ぽっぷるメイル, Hepburn: Poppuru Meiru) is a 1991 action-adventure platform video game developed and published by Nihon Falcom for the PC-8801. It was later ported to the PC-9801 and Super Famicom by Falcom, to the Sega CD by Sega and Sega Falcom, to the PC Engine Super CD-ROM² by NEC Home Electronics and HuneX, and to DoJa mobile phones by Bothtec.

Most versions of Popful Mail are for the most part similar to each other, but the Sega CD and Super Famicom versions differ significantly both from each other and from the other releases. The Sega CD version was going to be reworked even further to be part of Sega's Sonic the Hedgehog series, but this did not end up happening. This version was localized by Working Designs and released in North America in early 1995, and was the only version available outside Japan prior to July 2024.

== Gameplay ==
The player, as Mail, battles the first major boss, Wood Golem, in the PC-8801 version.

The Sega CD version has larger, more detailed sprites, and shows large character portraits during dialogue.

Popful Mail is a 2D platform game with several RPG elements - excluding the ability to level-up characters. The controls allow the player to jump, attack, open doors or treasure chests, and speak to another character. Additionally, the player can summon a menu to change some of the game's attributes, the current character, the current character's equipment, use or activate an item, read the game's status, save, load and quit.

At the start of the game, the only playable character is Mail; as the game progresses, Tatt and Gaw will be available, and the player may switch between them at any time through the use of the "character" option in the menu (except in the middle of cutscenes). Each character has different attacks and armor, as well as differences in walking speed and jump. Mail is the fastest character, but is the one whose jump is lowest. Tatt is balanced - slower than Mail but faster than Gaw - and his jump is similarly in between. Gaw is the slowest of the three, but can jump the highest and usually has the strongest attacks.

The character encounters enemies as well as non-playable characters. Often, when encountering an important character, the dialogue scenes begins immediately, with the player having differing levels of control over it depending on the version. Varying amounts of these scenes are voiced in the Sega CD and Super CD-ROM² versions, and the voiced parts cannot be skipped over as quickly as the non-voiced parts. In the Sega CD version, the voiced speech can be turned off in the options menu if so desired.

The character has 100 health points, and attacks from enemy characters diminish it according to the strength of the attacker. Similarly, all enemies have a 100 health point bar that has to be brought down to 0 for the enemy to be defeated. How much damage is dealt depends on the strength of the character, although an attack always causes the same amount of damage to the same enemy. The character also has a blue-grey bar that is depleted as a distance weapon or a magical attack is used. When the bar reaches 0, the character can still perform the weapon motion, but the magical or long range portion of the attack will fail. The bar regenerates quickly if given time to do so (if the character uses no attacks or switches to a melee weapon). Use of a distance weapon or magical attack while the bar is regenerating halts the regeneration, which resumes if no attacks that deplete it are made.

Each character can acquire up to five different weapons and various items. Each subsequent weapon is stronger than the preceding one, although the player may switch to any weapons possessed at any time if so desired, through the menu. Weapons include a sword, dagger, boomerang, staff, fireball, and claw. Items, different from weapons and armor, either affect the health bar or the character's status or serve as plot devices. They may confer invulnerability at a price, stability in snow, or replenish health, among other things. They can be obtained from other characters, treasure chests, shops, or bosses.

The game has a save game feature. Games may usually be saved and loaded at any point in the game (except during dialogues, world map travels, and the animated sequences); if a game that was previously saved in a room with a boss is loaded, the game resumes just before the battle, before the character has entered the room. The state of the game, including the hours played and the level, will be displayed. Three save slots are supplied, for storing up to three different states.

== Plot ==
Portrayed differently from port to port, set in an unnamed fantasy world, a prologue tells of a grand legend related to the realm. Long ago, three fallen gods of darkness known as the Masters of Evil attempted to lay siege to the mortal plane. They were Morgal, the Lord of Beasts, commander of the feral and the most voracious of monsters and beasts; Necros, the Master of War, corruptor of men and the inciter of temptation and vice; and Ulgar, the Overlord, the leader of the Masters of Evil and wielder of the most evil of magics. At the end of a great war that threatened all who lived, the Masters of Evil were sealed away in a floating tower far from the reach of anyone, with only three warriors - an elf, a human, and a dwarf - surviving to tell the tale.

In the present day, the main character and local bounty hunter Popful Mail makes her rounds. Her day escalates to the point where she squares off with her bounty, the criminal golem maker and technomancer, Nuts Cracker, into a nearby forest. Though defeated, Nuts Cracker's body manages to escape, and Mail cannot claim any bounty. Frustrated, she indifferently takes Nuts Cracker's head and wanders back into town. At the bounty post she attempts to trade the head in for cash, but like with many who have sought to capture Nuts Cracker before her, duplicates of his head are all they could retrieve, making the attempt a failure. She becomes reinvigorated when she spots a 2,000,000 gold reward poster for the wizard turned criminal, Muttonhead, near the post. With sword in hand and hope in heart, Mail makes leads into the nearby forest for clues. Her quest to undertake the biggest catch of her career will turn out greater, more perilous, more dangerous - and more rewarding - than she imagined.

== Characters ==
- The main playable character is Popful Mail (usually called "Mail" by other characters), a female elf bounty hunter who has not had much luck lately. Mail's main target Nuts Cracker always seems to escape after she defeats him. Mail has red hair and elven ears stick outward from her head. Her personality is rather confrontational, and she is never drawn as humorous or morose. Her main and starting weapon is a sword, though she can acquire a dagger and boomerang as the game progresses.
- Tatt is a magician, a former apprentice of Muttonhead. Tatt chases after his master, who has left him and his fellow students, in order to dissuade him from his path. Tatt is kind, polite, a bit timid and is sometimes ridiculed. His main weapon is a magical staff. He has blue hair and wears a red hat, perhaps to present him as neither a black magician nor a white one or possibly a red mage (a combination of the two).
- Gaw is a small, round, winged, cave-dwelling purple creature. He is almost identical to all the others of his species, who both call themselves "Gaw" and often use the word as an interjection when speaking. Mail and Tatt meet Gaw in the second level, the Caves, but Gaw joins them later still. Gaw's first main attack is a fireball; subsequent attacks include a tail swipe and clawing.
- Nuts Cracker, the first villain seen in the game, is the leader of a dangerous criminal gang known as the Gingerbread Grifter Gang. He specializes in manufacturing explosives, especially exploding dolls. Only appearing to be human, Nuts Cracker is fashioned like a nutcracker, wood and all, implying he had himself transformed into a machination. He speaks in a goofy, exaggerated Italian accent. When defeated, he will often throw his head - which explodes - while his body runs away. Mail has been trying to catch Nuts Cracker for a long time and has faced him on many occasions, but he always escapes.
- Muttonhead was formerly a well-known and respected magician before unexpectedly disappearing from public view and turning to crime, a move that left his apprentices puzzled. He is dangerous and his goals are unknown. A 2,000,000 gold bounty is offered for his capture.
- Slick is an elf acquaintance of Mail's. He often wants to tag along with Mail on her adventures, which, along with his bad jokes and obnoxious demeanor, annoys her to no end. He often causes more trouble than he solves and is especially infamous for his use of homemade bombs, which his grandfather taught him how to make.
- Glug is a kindly dwarf from the mines. Unlike everyone else, he enjoys Slick's company and they are both friends. It is hinted that Glug suffers from mental problems as a result of a strong knock on the head, which might also explain his naiveté and short memory.

== Development ==
Falcom developed the NEC PC versions of Popful Mail with features used in previous games in the company's Dragon Slayer and Ys series. They use the battle system of Ys, magic attacks like those of Ys II, and a side-scrolling view similar to that of Ys III. Characters react with pain when they fall from high places, as in Dragon Slayer IV (released as Legacy of the Wizard in North America). The original releases incorporate features from the popular game Xanadu (Dragon Slayer II) as well. The gameplay of Popful Mail was compared to the Metroid series by some critics, and is retroactively considered part of Metroidvania genre.

The game was originally released for the PC-8801 computer on December 20, 1991, and for the PC-9801 in 1992. A soundtrack titled Popful Mail Sound Box '94 (ぽっぷるメイル・サウンドボックス'94) containing music from the game in the CD format was published by Falcom Sound Team on August 24, 1994, in Japan.

=== Sega CD version ===
Popful Mail for the Sega CD was developed by Sega Falcom (a joint venture between Sega and Nihon Falcom) and published by Sega. It was initially conceptualized as an unorthodox remake of Popful Mail that would reimagine the game as a spin-off of Sonic the Hedgehog, titled Sister Sonic, which would replace the characters with characters from the Sonic franchise. Sister Sonic was to star Sonic's female family relative who would take the role as the main character, and was roughly described as a "mature and flirtatious bounty hunter". Sister Sonic was first announced in the November 1992 issue of the Japanese magazine Beep! MegaDrive in an interview with the then director of Sega Falcom. The rationale for the title was that Sega Falcom had not just translated but reinterpreted Nihon Falcom's hit titles, and Sister Sonic would have more international appeal. It was also rumored that this reinterpretation would be shown off at the upcoming 1993 Tokyo Toy Show. Upon hearing the announcement that the game was a rework of Popful Mail, fans in Japan sent letters to Sega urging them to instead release a remake of Popful Mail that was more faithful to the original. Due to this feedback, Sister Sonic was cancelled in Japan in favor of a more faithful remake of Popful Mail, and this was ultimately what was previewed at the 1993 Tokyo Toy Show. This version incorporated Japanese voice acting, which was recorded at a studio in Shinjuku on May 17, 1993. The title was released by Sega in Japan on April 1, 1994, and plans to release the Sister Sonic rebrand outside of Japan were still in place as of November 1993.

The localization of this version of Popful Mail was handed to Working Designs, with the Sister Sonic rebrand having been cancelled by the time the game reached them. Several changes and adjustments for the North American Sega CD release were made, including making difficulty higher. Downsampling and variable bitrates were used to compress the game's sounds from full 44.1 kHz CD quality to fit on the game disc. In animated sequences, waveform analysis was used to make characters' mouths match their dialogue. Two teams worked on the English translation for four months. This version was released in North America in early 1995.

=== Other versions ===
The Super Famicom remake of Popful Mail was the first game Falcom developed for the platform, and it was programmed and co-written by Jun Nagashima. Nagashima recalled in an interview that the team learned a lot from their initial mistakes, and gave the impression that the Super Famicom was not as easy to develop for as NEC's computers. This version was originally slated for release in December 1993, and was eventually released by Falcom on June 10, 1994.

A PC Engine Super CD-ROM² version of Popful Mail was revealed to be in the works by NEC Home Electronics by July 1993, with development handled by HuneX. Arcade Card support was confirmed by March 1994, the first screenshots were revealed about 10 months after the initial reveal, and the title was exhibited at the 1994 Tokyo Toy Show's NEC Booth. This version was released by NEC Home Electronics on August 12, 1994.

A mobile phone version similar to the original PC-8801 release for DoJa-supported systems was published in five parts from 2003 to 2004 by Bothtec. An emulated PC-8801 version was released by D4 Enterprise as part of their Project EGG series on December 28, 2006 in Japan. The latest releases of the game are an emulated Sega CD version on the Mega Drive Mini 2 and another emulated PC-8801 version for the Nintendo Switch, also part of Project EGG, which was released in Japan, North America, and Europe on July 11, 2024.

== Reception ==
Reception

Aggregate score
Aggregator	Score
GameRankings	93%

Review scores
Publication	Score
Electronic Gaming Monthly	8/10, 8/10, 7/10, 8/10 (SCD)
Famitsu	6/10, 7/10, 6/10, 5/10 (SFC); 23/40 (PCE); 6/10, 6/10, 5/10, 5/10 (SCD)
Next Generation	3/5 (SCD)

Award
Publication	Award
Retro Gamer	Top Ten Mega CD Games

In Electronic Gaming Monthly, the reviewers described the "cinema scenes" as a highlight. GamePro likewise gave their greatest praise to the cinema scenes and extensive voice acting, saying they "add great color to the game, setting these quirky characters apart from the standard mold of RPG heroes and villains." They also commented positively on the game's linear, undemanding gameplay. Retro Gamer included it on their list of top ten Mega CD games.

Next Generation reviewed the Sega CD version of the game, rating it three stars out of five, and stated that "If your sense of humor is off-kilter enough, it shouldn't matter how old you are."

== Legacy ==
Falcom used Popful Mail and its characters in various other media.

Popful Mail was adapted into a manga released by Mediaworks on Dengeki Comic Gao! in July 1996. It was written by Yuu Aizaki.

The company created two Mail drama CD series published by King Records: Popful Mail Paradise (ぽっぷるメイルパラダイス), a series of five CDs released between 1994 and 1995; and Popful Mail The Next Generation (ぽっぷるメイル－ザネクストジェネレーション), two CDs released beginning in 1996. Falcom created Tarako Pappara Paradise (TARAKOぱっぱらパラダイス), another drama CD published by King that features Mail, on 22 November 1995. GameMusic.com sells Tarako and Paradise dramas 2 through 5 in the United States.

As with Ys IV, an attempt was made to pitch an anime OVA based on the game to various anime studios, but the pilot failed to garner interest. The promotional video imagines Mail and friends finding themselves in Tokyo upon fighting a new foe. The theme song for the unreleased OVA, "No No Pessimist", was adapted with new lyrics into "Shinshin o Tobikoete" (星を飛び越えて; 'Leaping Over the Stars') by Megumi Hayashibara, which appeared on her 1994 album Sphere and in episode 8 of the anime Blue Seed.

Mail and Gaw, along with other Falcom characters, would return as secret "Masters" in the 1997 Falcom game Vantage Master. Mail's outfit is featured as a downloadable costume for Tina Armstrong in Tecmo Koei's Dead or Alive 5: Last Round.
