= Ys IV =

Ys IV may refer to:

- Ys IV: The Dawn of Ys, a video game in the Ys series developed for the PC Engine by Hudson Soft
- Ys IV: Mask of the Sun, a video game in the Ys series developed for the Super Famicom by Tonkin House, and later remade for the PlayStation 2
- Ys: Memories of Celceta, a video game in the Ys series developed for the PlayStation Vita by Nihon Falcom
