= YSII =

YSII or Ys II may refer to:

- Ys II, a 1988 video game
- NAMC YS-11, a commercial airliner
- Saibai Island Airport, Saibai Island, Queensland, Australia
- the second Ys anime series
