= Ys VIII: Lacrimosa of Dana =

2016 video game

- Developer: Nihon Falcom (Note: PC and Nintendo Switch versions ported by Nippon Ichi Software.)
- Publisher: NIS America (Note: Nintendo Switch version published by Nippon Ichi Software in Japan.): JP: Nihon Falcom
- Director: Takayuki Kusano
- Producer: Toshihiro Kondo
- Programmers: Hideyuki Yamashita; Noriyuki Chiyoda; Atsushi Oosaki
- Writers: Toshihiro Kondo; Yoshihiro Konda; Syunsei Shikata; Yuuta Miyazaki
- Composers: Hayato Sonoda; Takahiro Unisuga; Yukihiro Jindo; Mitsuo Singa
- Series: Ys
- Platforms: PlayStation Vita; PlayStation 4; Windows; Nintendo Switch; Stadia; PlayStation 5; Android; iOS; Nintendo Switch 2
- Release: July 21, 2016: PlayStation Vita; JP: July 21, 2016; NA: September 12, 2017; EU: September 15, 2017 PlayStation 4; JP: May 25, 2017; NA: September 12, 2017; EU: September 15, 2017 Windows; WW: April 16, 2018 Nintendo Switch; NA: June 26, 2018; JP: June 28, 2018; PAL: June 29, 2018 Amazon Luna; US: October 20, 2020 Stadia; WW: April 1, 2021 PlayStation 5; NA: November 15, 2022; EU: November 18, 2022; AU: November 25, 2022; JP: July 31, 2025 Nintendo Switch 2; WW: February 25, 2027 Android, iOS; WW: TBA
- Genre: Action role-playing
- Mode: Single-player

Ys VIII: Lacrimosa of Dana (Note: Japanese: イース VIII -Lacrimosa of DANA-, Hepburn: Īsu Eito -Rakurimosa obu Dāna-) is a 2016 action role-playing game developed by Nihon Falcom and published by NIS America. A part of the Ys series, it was first released in Japan by Falcom for the PlayStation Vita in July 2016, with later worldwide releases for PlayStation 4, Windows, Nintendo Switch, Amazon Luna, Stadia, PlayStation 5, and Nintendo Switch 2. An abridged version for Android and iOS, Ys VIII Mobile, is also scheduled for release. Ys VIII had sold over 500,000 copies by the end of 2018. The game was followed up by Ys IX: Monstrum Nox in 2019.

In 2023, the official novelization of the game by Anna Kashina was released.

== Plot ==
Adol is on a passenger ship called the Lombardia that is headed from Xandria to the continent of Eresia, but the ship is attacked in the archipelagos of the Gaete Sea by a giant creature and is sunk. When Adol wakes up, he realizes he landed on the shore of a cursed island known as the Isle of Seiren. On his search for other survivors, he teams up with the noblewoman, Laxia von Roswell, and fisherman Sahad Nautilus to help his fellow castaways to survive and find a way to get off the island. At the same time, he wants to find out what lies behind his dreams about Dana Iclucia, a mysterious girl from a prehistoric era who seemingly has a connection to the Isle of Seiren and Adol's fate.

Adol's party is soon expanded to include Hummel Trabaldo, a transporter who was a passenger on the Lombardia, and Ricotta Beldine, a resident of the Isle of Seiren. While exploring the island for additional castaways, Laxia notes the creatures on the island are unlike anything known to the outside world. Citing her father's academic research, she concludes that the monsters are an extinct group of animals known as Primordials. Further exploration in the north of the island leads the group to the ruins of an ancient civilization known as Eternia, whose residents possessed a power known as Essence. It is here where the party discovers Dana, waking from a deep slumber, telling the group she is the last of the Eternians, but does not know why, nor why she is alive in the current era, as she is suffering from amnesia.

The castaways begin to build a ship to escape the island; Adol's party continues to explore the island for clues to what sank the Lombardia. After research into the matter, it is discovered that a Primordial known as the Oceanus was responsible for the sinking of their ship, as it has historically attacked ships since before Dana's era. The castaways band together and defeat the Oceanus, allowing for safe travel in the surrounding sea, but questions surrounding the Primordials and Dana's situation lead the group to continue to explore the island. By doing this, Dana begins to slowly regain her memories. She discovers that multiple meteorites crashed into Eternia long ago, killing many people and triggering events akin to a nuclear winter, which led to the extinction of Eternians. This event was brought forth by a process called the Lacrimosa, which triggers an extinction event after the primary species on earth has run its course. During each Lacrimosa, one member of the species is chosen to survive and become an immortal Warden of Evolution, one who watches over the Lacrimosa and ensures the process is successfully carried out. Dana was chosen to be the protector representing Eternians; she resisted and put herself into a deep sleep until the next Lacrimosa would occur. Dana awoke in the present because the current Lacrimosa was beginning: the extinction of humans, to be accomplished through the revival of Primordials as the primary species. Consequently, Adol is selected to be the next Warden of Evolution, representing the human species.

With Dana's help, Adol's crew becomes the first group to resist the Lacrimosa, ending the process and ensuring the continued survival of the human race. Stopping the Lacrimosa does not go as planned, and the world begins to collapse. Dana uses her essence to disrupt the end of the world, but seemingly dies in the process. Shortly thereafter, while mourning the loss of Dana, the goddess of the world, Maia, makes an appearance, telling the group that Dana's sacrifice has led her to become the Goddess of Evolution, tasked with watching over the world. Dana and the other protectors appear; Dana wishes goodbye to Adol's group, while the other Protectors inform Adol the Lacrimosa may still need to be used in the future to prevent the world from collapsing. After the Protectors and Goddesses disappear, the castaways finish construction of their ship and sail home, parting ways and returning to their normal lives.

== Gameplay ==
Ys VIII: Lacrimosa of Dana is an action role-playing game played from a third-person perspective. It builds on the gameplay foundation of Ys Seven and Ys: Memories of Celceta, where players control multiple main characters that can be switched between on-the-fly, each with their own play styles and unique skills. The player collects a variety of materials by defeating local wildlife and opening chests. These materials can be crafted into items that the player can use on their journey, such as healing items and stronger weapons. Various fellow shipwrecked passengers can be rescued and brought to the village where they will provide valuable services.

There are three damage types, determined by a character's weapon: Slash, Strike, and Pierce. Enemies will take more damage from a damage type they are vulnerable against. Skills can be assigned to a corresponding button and using skills requires SP, which can be refilled mainly by landing a fully-charged attack against an enemy. Each character has a powerful move called an EXTRA Skill that can only be used when the EXTRA Gauge is filled.

Furthermore, players can attempt to parry attacks or evade them shortly before the attack lands. Successfully parrying an attack will activate Flash Guard for a short period of time, where all damage from enemies is nullified and all attacks will deliver critical damage. Similarly, successfully evading an attack by performing a dodge roll will activate Flash Move for a short period of time, where everything but the player will move in slow motion.

As the story progresses, the game continuously switches perspectives between its two protagonists—Adol and Dana. Adol's exploration of the Isle of Seiren can be affected by Dana's actions in her world, such as opening a new path or altering the landscape. An experimental co-op multiplayer feature was added to the PC version in January 2020.

== Development ==
Ys VIII was announced in August 2014 for PlayStation Vita and PlayStation 4. It was released in Japan on July 21, 2016. It is the first game in the Ys series to be released for PlayStation 4, as well as the first time that Falcom worked on a PlayStation 4 game. First-print copies and pre-orders for the game included an art book. The game was localized in English and French.

Initially to be released in 2017, NIS America delayed the Windows version to a later date to improve its performance and localization, where it was released on April 16, 2018. The game was released for the Nintendo Switch worldwide in June 2018. A version for Amazon Luna was released on October 20, 2020. It came in both standard edition and a limited edition with several collectibles. A PlayStation 5 version was released worldwide in November 2022.A Nintendo Switch 2 version is set to release on February 25, 2027.

The game's animated opening was produced by Studio 3Hz, and was directed by Masayuki Sakoi. The CGI in the opening was produced by animation studio Orange. A port for Android and iOS, developed by Linekong Entertainment, was announced in April 2019 with a release date originally set for 2020 before being delayed. Known as Ys VIII Mobile, it will feature a new party member named Rucol and reimagined locations.

== Reception ==
Reception

Aggregate score
Aggregator	Score
Metacritic	PS4: 85/100; PC: 69/100; NS: 82/100; PS5: 83/100

Review scores
Publication	Score
Destructoid	9/10
Easy Allies	4/5
Famitsu	34/40
Game Informer	8.25/10
GameSpot	8/10
Hardcore Gamer	4/5
Nintendo Life	9/10
Nintendo World Report	8.5/10
Push Square	PS4: 8/10; PS5: 8/10
RPGamer	VITA: 4.0/5; PS4: 4.5/5
RPGFan	PS4: 82/100; VITA: 80/100; NS: 75/100

Ys VIII: Lacrimosa of Dana received "generally favorable" reviews for most platforms, according to review aggregator Metacritic; the Windows version received "mixed or average" reviews. Famitsu scored the game a 34/40. They stated that the story is better than predecessors, and liked the pace of battle.

The game's original English localization was met with criticism for its quality. In October 2017, Takuro Yamashita, the president and CEO of NIS America, issued a statement personally apologizing for it and announced intentions to fix it. An update addressing these concerns, including fully rerecorded dialogue, was released in January 2018. The game's release on Windows was also met with criticism due to its poor technical performance. A patch addressing the issues was released in January 2020.

The game won the award for "Best Action Combat System" at Game Informer's 2017 RPG of the Year Awards.

=== Sales ===
On its first week of release in Japan, the PlayStation Vita version of Ys VIII: Lacrimosa of Dana reached second place in game sales charts with 43,753 units sold. The PlayStation 4 version sold 27,741 units in its first week, surpassing Mario Kart 8 Deluxe. Falcom president and game producer Toshihiro Kondo stated that the Nintendo Switch version met sales expectations outside of Japan. By October 2018, sales of the game surpassed over 500,000 copies, and by August 2019, had reached over 600,000 copies worldwide.
