= Ys X: Nordics =

2023 video game

- Cover featuring Karja Balta and Adol Christin
- Developer: Nihon Falcom (Note: Windows version ported by PH3 Games)
- Publisher: NIS America: JP: Nihon Falcom
- Artist: toi8
- Series: Ys
- Platforms: PlayStation 4; PlayStation 5; Nintendo Switch; Windows; Proud Nordics; Nintendo Switch 2; PlayStation 5; Windows
- Release: September 28, 2023: PS4, PS5, Switch; JP: September 28, 2023; WW: October 25, 2024; Windows; AS: March 14, 2024; WW: October 25, 2024; Proud Nordics; Switch 2; JP: July 31, 2025; AS: August 21, 2025; WW: February 20, 2026; AU: February 27, 2026; Windows; AS: August 21, 2025; WW: February 20, 2026; AU: February 27, 2026; PS5; JP: February 19, 2026; WW: February 20, 2026; AU: February 27, 2026
- Genre: Action role-playing
- Mode: Single-player

Ys X: Nordics (Note: Japanese: イースX -NORDICS-, Hepburn: Īsu Ten Nōdikusu) is a 2023 action role-playing game developed by Nihon Falcom. A part of the Ys series, it was released in Japan for the PlayStation 4, PlayStation 5, and Nintendo Switch in September 2023 and was released worldwide by NIS America, including a Windows port, in October 2024. The game follows Adol Christin who gets introduced to the seafaring warrior Karja Balta and the conflict between the Normans, her people, and monsters known as the Griegr.

An enhanced version, Ys X: Proud Nordics, (Note: Japanese: イースX -Proud NORDICS-, Hepburn: Īsu Ten Puraudo Nōdikusu) was released in Japan for the Nintendo Switch 2 in July 2025 and was released worldwide in February 2026, also for the PlayStation 5 and Windows.

== Gameplay ==
Ys X: Nordics is an action role-playing game played from a third-person perspective. It breaks away from the party system used in Ys Seven (2009), Ys: Memories of Celceta (2012), Ys VIII: Lacrimosa of Dana (2016), and Ys IX: Monstrum Nox (2019) by only featuring two playable characters. The game features sailing and ship combat, a first for the series.

== Development and release ==
Ys X: Nordics, the tenth main entry in the Ys series, was developed by Nihon Falcom and released for the PlayStation 4, PlayStation 5, and Nintendo Switch in Japan on September 28, 2023. A Windows port was released in Asian markets on March 14, 2024. The game was released worldwide on all four platforms by NIS America, localized in English and French, on October 25, 2024.

An enhanced version, Ys X: Proud Nordics, was released in Japan on July 31, 2025, for the Nintendo Switch 2, followed by a Chinese and Korean release on Switch 2 and Windows on August 21, 2025. It was released worldwide by NIS America for both platforms and PlayStation 5 on February 20, 2026, with a Japanese PS5 release a day earlier. Proud Nordics adds new character abilities, bosses, and levels.

== Reception ==
Reception

Aggregate scores
Aggregator	Score
Metacritic	PS5: 80/100 (Note: Based on 28 critic reviews); NS: 77/100; PC: 80/100; Proud Nordics; NS2: 83/100; PS5: 83/100
OpenCritic	78% recommend (Note: Based on 69 critic reviews)

Review scores
Publication	Score
Famitsu	34/40
GameStar	75/100
Hardcore Gamer	4.0/5
HobbyConsolas	80/100
Nintendo Life	8/10
Nintendo World Report	8.5
RPGamer	4.5/5
RPGFan	93/100
Shacknews	7/10
The Games Machine (Italy)	8/10

Ys X: Nordics has a score of 80/100 on Metacritic. It has a 79/100 top critic average and a 78% recommendation score on OpenCritic. It was given the Editor's Choice award by RPGFan. In Japan, four critics from Famitsu gave the game a total score of 34 out of 40.
