= YSS (disambiguation) =

YSS is Young–Simpson syndrome, a rare congenital disorder.

YSS may also refer to:

== Groups, organizations ==
- Yayasan Sukarelawan Siswa (Malay: Student Volunteer Foundation), Ministry of Higher Education (Malaysia)
- Yogoda Satsanga Society of India, a non-profit nonsectarian spiritual organization
- Yorkshire Subterranean Society, a caving club
- Young Scottish Socialists, the youth wing of the Scottish Socialist Party

== Places ==
- Yengema Secondary School, Sierra Leone
- Yishun Secondary School, Singapore

== Other uses ==
- Yessan-Mayo language (ISO 639 language code yss), a language found in Papua New Guinea
- Yi Sun-sin, 16th century Korean admiral

== See also ==
- YS (disambiguation) for the singular of YSs
