= Ys IX: Monstrum Nox =

2019 video game

- Developer: Nihon Falcom (Note: Nintendo Switch version ported by Engine Software. Windows version ported by Engine Software and PH3 Games.)
- Publisher: NIS America: JP: Nihon Falcom (Note: Nintendo Switch version published by Nippon Ichi Software in Japan.)
- Directors: Takayuki Kusano; Hisayoshi Takeiri
- Producer: Toshihiro Kondo
- Programmers: Hideyuki Yamashita; Noriyuki Chiyoda
- Writers: Toshihiro Kondo; Yoshihiro Konda; Syunsei Shikata
- Composers: Hayato Sonoda; Takahiro Unisuga; Yukihiro Jindo; Mitsuo Singa
- Series: Ys
- Platforms: PlayStation 4; Stadia; Windows; Nintendo Switch; PlayStation 5
- Release: September 26, 2019: PlayStation 4; JP: September 26, 2019; NA: February 2, 2021; EU: February 5, 2021; AU: February 12, 2021 Stadia, Windows; WW: July 6, 2021 Nintendo Switch; NA: July 6, 2021; EU: July 9, 2021; AU: July 16, 2021; JP: September 9, 2021 PlayStation 5; NA: May 9, 2023; EU: May 12, 2023; AU: May 19, 2023; JP: July 31, 2025
- Genre: Action role-playing
- Mode: Single-player

Ys IX: Monstrum Nox (Note: Japanese: イースIX -Monstrum NOX-) is a 2019 action role-playing game developed by Nihon Falcom. A part of the Ys series, it was released for the PlayStation 4 in Japan in September 2019 and worldwide by NIS America in February 2021. The game received additional releases for Windows, Nintendo Switch and Stadia in July 2021, and PlayStation 5 in May 2023. Ys IX received generally positive reviews from critics. The game was followed up by Ys X: Nordics in 2023.

In 2026, the official novelization of the game by Anna Kashina was released.

== Gameplay ==
Ys IX: Monstrum Nox is an action role-playing game played from a third-person perspective. It further builds on the gameplay foundation of Ys VIII: Lacrimosa of Dana, where players control multiple main characters that can be switched between on-the-fly, each with their own play styles and unique skills. Players collect a variety of weapons and items by defeating enemies and opening chests.

Players can consume SP to unleash a character's unique skill attack, and SP can be restored by landing hits on enemies or it can regenerate faster when the player is not attacking. Boost mode, a returning game mechanic from Ys: The Oath in Felghana and Ys Origin, temporarily increases damage dealt, decreases damage received, and increases attack and movement speeds.

New to Ys IX, each party member has traversal abilities, called Monstrum Gifts, such as gliding and running up walls. Players can reach various places and locate hidden secrets in the city of Balduq and dungeons by utilizing these actions.

== Development ==
Ys IX: Monstrum Nox was initially teased as Project N.O.X. before being revealed in December 2018. Nihon Falcom president Toshihiro Kondo said that he wanted the next Ys game to lean more towards the adventure genre, with Dana's arc in Ys VIII: Lacrimosa of Dana as a hint. In another interview, Kondo said that he wanted to take the new axis of direction and movement introduced in Ys VIII: Lacrimosa of Dana to the next level, citing examples such as an air dash or a hook shot.

The game was developed by Nihon Falcom and released for the PlayStation 4 in Japan on September 26, 2019. It was released by NIS America for the PlayStation 4 in North America, Europe and Australasia in February 2021, with additional releases for Windows, Nintendo Switch, and Stadia in July. The first three versions have English and French localizations. Nippon Ichi Software released the Switch version in Japan on September 9, 2021. The Windows version was ported by Engine Software and PH3 Games. The Switch version was ported by Engine Software. A PlayStation 5 version was released in May 2023 for North America, Europe, and Australasia. Traditional Chinese and Korean localizations were published by Clouded Leopard Entertainment in February 2020.

== Reception ==
Reception

Aggregate score
Aggregator	Score
Metacritic	PS4: 80/100; NS: 76/100

Review scores
Publication	Score
Famitsu	35/40
IGN	8/10
RPGamer	4/5
RPGFan	81/100

Ys IX: Monstrum Nox received "generally favorable" reviews, according to review aggregator Metacritic. Japanese magazine Famitsu scored the PlayStation 4 version a 35 out of 40. 4gamer.net recommended the game for players who enjoy exploration, while remarking upon the game's difficulty as being well-balanced.

=== Sales ===
The game sold 45,378 copies during its launch week in Japan.
