= Ys vs. Trails in the Sky =

2010 video game

Ys vs. Trails in the Sky: Alternative Saga
- Developer: Nihon Falcom
- Publishers: JP: Nihon Falcom; WW: Refint/games
- Director: Toshihiro Kondo
- Producer: Masayuki Kato
- Writers: Toshihiro Kondo; Yoshihiro Konda; Yuuta Miyazaki
- Composer: Yukihiro Jindo
- Series: Ys; Trails
- Platforms: PlayStation Portable, Nintendo Switch, PlayStation 4, PlayStation 5, Windows
- Release: PlayStation Portable: JP: July 29, 2010; Switch, PS4, PS5, Windows: WW: October 10, 2025
- Genre: Fighting
- Modes: Single-player, multiplayer

Ys vs. Trails in the Sky: Alternative Saga (Note: Japanese: イースvs.空の軌跡 オルタナティブ・サーガ, Hepburn: Īsu vs. Sora no Kiseki: Orutanatibu Sāga) is a 2010 crossover fighting game by Nihon Falcom. The game involves players choosing a character and participating in up to four-player fights against other characters from Falcom's Ys and Trails role-playing game series. It was released in Japan for the PlayStation Portable in 2010, with an English version released by Refint/games for Nintendo Switch, PlayStation 4, PlayStation 5, and Windows in 2025.

== Gameplay ==
Ys vs. Trails in the Sky plays as a crossover fighting game, similar in concept the Super Smash Bros., Dissidia Final Fantasy, and Tales of VS, in which the player chooses characters taken from a series and directs them in a fight against characters from other franchises. It takes its roster from two of Nihon Falcom's series, Ys and Trails, and is played from a top-down perspective.

The game contains a story mode, where a player goes through a series of battles while experiencing story sequences in between. Five separate difficulty settings are available. Additionally, local multiplayer of up to four players is also available via an ad hoc connection. Battles may be played both competitively and cooperatively.

=== Characters ===
Adol Christin, Dogi, Elk, Mishera, Aisha, Geis, Cruxie, and Chester Stoddart are sourced from Ys, with Estelle Bright, Joshua Astray, Tita Russell, Agate Crosner, Olivier Lenheim, Kloe Rinz, Renne, Leonhardt, and Lloyd Bannings sourced from Trails. The game also employs a support character system, which entails choosing a character who temporarily assists the player's character by applying a status effect. Some of these characters come from other Falcom games, such as Jurio and Chris from The Legend of Heroes II: Prophecy of the Moonlight Witch, Dela from Brandish, and Gurumins from Gurumin.

== Development ==
Ys vs. Trails in the Sky was first announced in an issue of Dengeki PlayStation in November 2009. The game was created due to Nihon Falcom's desire to make use of the PlayStation Portable's wireless ad hoc local multiplayer function, something they had not been able to work into prior JRPG titles. They also felt that both series, Trails and Ys, while JRPGs, both had many themes in them related to battle and conflict that they felt lent to a natural transition to a fighting game. The game's engine was based on the one first used in Ys Seven. The game contains the full Japanese voice acting. Additionally, the game's music was a mix of original compositions and arrangements from the Ys and Trails games by Yukihiro Jindo.

Ys vs. Trails in the Sky was released in Japan on July 29, 2010. In addition to the standard version, a special limited edition was also released, which in addition to the game, contained the game's soundtrack, an album of selected music from Falcom's library, a special booklet of game information, and special card for a promotional Victory Spark trading card game. Website Siliconera had speculated that the game would be likely to get an English localization due to Xseed Games's relationship with Falcom, Falcom's stated intention to focus further on Western markets around 2010, and the fact that the game would be a smaller undertaking to translate than the typical text-heavy JRPG. An English patch by the fan translation group Geofront was released in October 2021, with an official version released by Refint/games for Nintendo Switch, PlayStation 4, PlayStation 5, and Windows on October 10, 2025.

== Reception ==
Reception

Aggregate score
Aggregator	Score
OpenCritic	59% recommend

The game debuted eighth on the Media Create Japanese video game charts, selling 30,047 copies in its opening week, and seventh on the Famitsu charts. The game was one of many in the release week that IGN cited as being drivers in PSP hardware as well, with the system itself doubling the sales of its prior week. The game sold well enough to warrant a "The Best" budget re-release in July 2011.
