= Ys IV: Mask of the Sun =

1993 video game

- Developers: Tonkin House; Arc System Works (PS2)
- Publishers: Tonkin House; Taito (PS2)
- Composers: Yoshiaki Kubodera; Masanori Hikichi; Miyoko Takaoka; Naoyuki Ito; Tomohiro Endo; Hiroo Tengenji
- Series: Ys
- Platforms: Super Famicom, PlayStation 2
- Release: Super Famicom: JP: November 19, 1993; PlayStation 2: JP: May 26, 2005
- Genre: Action role-playing
- Mode: Single-player

Ys IV: Mask of the Sun (Note: Japanese: イースIV - Mask of the Sun -, Hepburn: Īsu Fō) is a 1993 action role-playing game developed by Tonkin House for the Super Famicom. It is the fourth game in the Ys video game series.

Mask of the Sun was one of two games released under the title of Ys IV, the other being Hudson Soft's Ys IV: The Dawn of Ys for the PC Engine CD-ROM. The two games share the same basic story, but many changes were made in the Hudson-produced Dawn of Ys. Of the two, Mask of the Sun was the official Ys IV storyline before the release of Ys: Memories of Celceta.

== Plot ==
Ys IV takes place between the events of Ys II and Ys III: Wanderers from Ys. After returning to the town of Minea, Adol comes across a message in a bottle. The message is from the far-off land of Celceta, asking for help. Adol decides to take the offer and boards a ship to the land of Celceta.

In this version of Ys IV, Adol's departure occurs immediately at the start of the game; there are no initial events occurring in the actual town of Minea, as there were in The Dawn of Ys.

== Gameplay ==
Ys IV returns to the style of play used in Ys I and II. Adol is viewed from a top-down perspective, and he attacks enemies by running into them to cause damage. Adol gains experience from defeating enemies, and gaining experience serves to raise his strength, as in the previous games. A new Magic system is introduced as well, in which Adol can equip elemental swords to cast various types of attack spells.

== Music ==
The original Ys IV music was composed by Falcom's Sound Team JDK, and was arranged for the Super Famicom by the Cube Corporation sound team. Mask of the Sun generally draws from the same source music as The Dawn of Ys, though much of it is used differently between the two games. In addition, there are a number of new compositions which are used exclusively in Mask of the Sun.

The PlayStation 2 remake of Mask of the Sun only used the original Ys IV music, with none of the tracks composed for the Super Famicom version being present. This version's usage of the music also differs from the original Mask of the Sun and The Dawn of Ys in many places.

== Development ==
Ys series creators Nihon Falcom licensed its development to Tonkin House. A Mega-CD version of Mask of the Sun was planned to be developed by Sega Falcom, a joint-venture between Nihon Falcom and Sega, but this version was ultimately canceled. In 2005, Taito developed a remake of Mask of the Sun for the PlayStation 2, titled Ys IV: Mask of the Sun – A New Theory.

== Reception ==
Reception

Review score
Publication	Score
Famitsu	(SFC) 24/40

Japanese gaming magazine Famitsu gave the PS2 version of the game a 25 out of 40 score.

== Legacy ==
A novel prequel was written by Waku Ōba and two different manga versions were done by Hitoshi Okuda and Nozomu Tamaki.
