= Ys: Memories of Celceta =

2012 video game

- Developer: Nihon Falcom (Note: PC version ported by Hyde, Inc.)
- Publishers: JP: Nihon Falcom; NA: Xseed Games; PAL: NIS America (PSV), Marvelous Europe (PS4); WW: Xseed Games (Win)
- Series: Ys
- Platforms: PlayStation Vita; Windows; PlayStation 4; Nintendo Switch
- Release: September 27, 2012: PlayStation Vita; JP: September 27, 2012; NA: November 26, 2013; AU: February 20, 2014; EU: February 21, 2014 Windows; CHN: October 28, 2015; WW: July 25, 2018 PlayStation 4; JP: May 16, 2019; NA: June 9, 2020; EU: June 19, 2020 Memoire Switch; JP: May 22, 2025; WW: April 28, 2026
- Genre: Action role-playing
- Mode: Single-player

Ys: Memories of Celceta (Note: Ys: Foliage Ocean in Celceta (イース セルセタの樹海, Īsu Seruseta no Jukai) in Japanese) is a 2012 action role-playing game developed by Nihon Falcom. The game was originally released for the PlayStation Vita in Japan and later in North America by Xseed Games in November 2013, and in PAL regions by NIS America in February 2014. A Windows version was released in China in 2015, and worldwide in July 2018. A PlayStation 4 version was released in Japan in May 2019, and in North America and Europe in June 2020. A version for the Nintendo Switch called Ys Memoire: Revelations in Celceta was released in May 2025 in Japan, featuring an option to switch to a newly arranged soundtrack.

Memories of Celceta is identified by Nihon Falcom as the 4th canonical game in the series, after they had outsourced the development of Ys IV: Mask of the Sun and Ys IV: The Dawn of Ys in the 1990s. The game follows the usual series protagonist Adol Christin, who begins the game with amnesia, as he explores the forests of Celceta with his companions.

== Gameplay ==
Gameplay of Memories of Celceta is similar to other Ys titles, as it is an action role-playing game featuring real-time combat. In addition to a standard attack button, special moves called Skills can be utilized by pressing certain button combinations. Throughout most of the game, the main protagonist Adol is accompanied by Duren, but other party members also join at different times. Each member has a specific attack type classified into three types: Slash, Strike, and Pierce. Some enemies are weak against a certain type of attack and are resistant to the other two; other enemies have no particular weakness and thus any attack type is effective. A maximum of three characters can be used at a time, and can be switched on-the-fly. Each character has a powerful move called an EXTRA move that can only be used when the meter is filled. Various accessories can be equipped giving various passive bonuses. The eight different statistics of weapons and armor can be customized by reinforcing with different minerals, plant and animal materials. Furthermore, players can attempt to parry attacks, evade them shortly before the attack lands, or take a defensive stance to reduce damage taken. A successful parry is known as a flash guard, nullifies only the parried hit's damage, earns skill points, and turns any successful ripostes into critical attacks. A successful evasion shortly before they would land is known as a flash move, makes the party temporarily invincible, and slows down the enemy. Also, the game makes use of both the touchscreen and rear touch pad to provide useful features.

== Plot ==
The game takes place a year after the events of Ys X: Nordics, and about a year before Ys: The Oath in Felghana. The game is set in the land of Celceta, and begins when the series's protagonist, Adol Christin, arrives in the town of Casnan with amnesia for unknown reasons. Then, he meets an information dealer, Duren, who claims to have met him before. Governor-General Griselda, the local ruler, then hires Adol and Duren to explore Celceta and draw a map of it because neither she nor her government has a full map of the area.

While exploring the forest, Adol slowly recovers his memories of his previous encounters. He and Duren explore local villages and meet Karna, a warrior from Comodo Village, and Ozma, the village leader from Selray Village. Adol had previously met both but had no memory of meeting them. Both Karna and Ozma join Adol. They also meet antagonistic characters Bami, a witch who had been abducting villagers from Comodo and controlling them with magic masks, including Karna's brother Remnos, and Gadis, a beast tamer who attacked Selray and tried to take their Spardas, beasts the Selray villagers consider sacred. Adol also meets Gruda, an officer of the Romun army, who is sympathetic towards Adol's exploration.

Eventually, Adol's group arrives in Highland, a town near something called the Tower of Providence, where a mysterious being, referred to as a "god" by the locals, called Eldeel lives. They also meet Calilica, the daughter of the village chief, and Leeza, an apostle of Eldeel. Leeza explains Adol's memory loss is because of Eldeel, but that he should not have lost all of his memories. With Calilica's help, who also joins the group, they reach the Tower and meet Eldeel, a white winged being. Eldeel reveals he is an actual god and has helped humanity advance in the past, and has also already met Adol, but is currently sick. He briefly transforms into a black winged being with a malevolent personality, demanding Adol return something called the "Mask of the Sun", and passes out, his wings turning white again.

Immediately after, Adol and the group return to Highland and find it under attack by Gruda, Bami, Gadis, and an army of masked men, including Karna's brother Remnos, who is acting on his own volition. Adol's group repels the attack, but not before learning the masks Bami created are copies of the Mask of the Sun, which is hidden somewhere in the forest. The group arrives in Danan village and meet Frieda, a warrior from the village. It is revealed Danan is home to a group of Darklings, people who rebelled against the gods centuries ago and are trying to repent for their crimes. Duren reveals he is from Danan and has actually been protecting Adol the entire time. They are also shown that the Mask of the Sun is sealed in Danan. Shortly after, Gruda appears, revealing his is also from Danan and wants to use the Mask to access something called the Akashic Records, or the blueprints of the world, and rewrite reality to benefit humans. Gruda steals the mask and the group, along with Frieda, chase him to Elduke, where the Records are sealed.

At Elduke, it is shown Gruda and Eldeel are working together. Using the Mask, they enter Elduke but leave Adol and the group locked outside. They also learn from a being called the Grand Roo of the Mask of the Moon, which can turn Eldeel back to normal. They collect the Mask of the Moon, fighting and defeating Bami and Gadis along the way. Remnos also reveals he was on Adol's side the entire time and tried stopping Gruda's group from the inside but failed. Adol and the group use the Mask of the Moon to enter Elduke and confront and defeat Eldeel, using the moon mask to heal him, sealing away his evil personality. Adol and the party also ultimately defeat Gruda, who had used the Mask of the Sun to absorb the power of the Akashic Records into himself.

With no other options, Eldeel has the group destroy the Mask of the Sun by throwing it into Mt. Vesuvio, a volcano. If they destroy the mask, no one else will be able to access the Records again. They fight their way to the volcano. At the top, Adol fights and destroys a shade of Gruda, permanently destroying him. He also succeeds with destroying the mask. Adol is rescued from the volcano before it explodes. In a flashback, Eldeel grants Adol the title of "adventurer", which Adol is referred to subsequently in his adventures. After which the party parts ways and goes on with their regular lives.

== Reception ==
Reception

Aggregate score
Aggregator	Score
Metacritic	VITA: 82/100; PC: 74/100; PS4: 75/100

Review scores
Publication	Score
Destructoid	9.5/10
Game Informer	8.50/10
GameSpot	8/10
Hardcore Gamer	4.5/5
IGN	7.5/10
GamingUnion.net	9/10

Ys: Memories of Celceta received "generally positive" reception, according to review aggregator Metacritic.

Destructoid's Wesley Ruscher scored the game 9.5/10. He praised the writing, music, and colorful graphics, and described the combat as a more "fast and frantic" version of what is found in the Zelda series, without becoming "overly complicated". Ruscher appreciated the "streamlined and efficient" gameplay, such as simplified crafting and quest systems, one-button special moves, and a fast-travel and waypoint mechanic that kept backtracking from becoming tedious.

Game Informer's Kimberley Wallace gave Memories of Celceta 8.50/10. She appreciated that combat required strategy and thoughtfulness, rather than mindless button-mashing, yielding different effects and rewards based on play style while remaining "easy to pick up". Wallace found that her decisions in the "easy-to-grasp" crafting system allowed her to "make battles play out quickly", while the party members' unique skills were well-utilized both in dungeons and during combat. She however thought that the plot was "clichéd" and "uninteresting", and that the fast-travel system was too cumbersome until partway through the game.

Bradly Hale of Hardcore Gamer gave the game a 4.5/5, calling it "one of the Vita’s most prized RPGs, and realistically, one of its best titles".

The PlayStation 4 version of Ys: Memories of Celceta was the bestselling retail game during its first week of release in Japan, with 13,895 physical copies being sold.
