= Ys Strategy =

2006 video game

- Developer: Future Creates
- Publishers: JP: Marvelous Interactive; PAL: Rising Star Games
- Composer: Kinji Nomura
- Series: Ys
- Platform: Nintendo DS
- Release: JP: March 23, 2006; EU: November 17, 2006; AU: December 7, 2006
- Genre: Real-time strategy
- Mode: Single-player

Ys Strategy is a 2006 real-time strategy video game. A part of the Ys series, it was developed by Future Creates and published by Marvelous Interactive in Japan and Rising Star Games in Europe and Australia.

== Reception ==
Reception

Aggregate score
Aggregator	Score
Metacritic	51/100

Review score
Publication	Score
Famitsu	25/40

The game received "mixed or average" reviews, according to video game review aggregator Metacritic. In Japan, Famitsu gave it a score of one six, one five, and two sevens, for a total of 25 out of 40.
