= Ys (OVA) =

Two Japanese anime series

- Cover artwork from the DVD Legacy collection of the anime series Ys

イース (Īsu)
- Genre: Fantasy, adventure
- Original video animation
- Directed by: Jun Kamiya (#1–4); Takashi Watanabe (#5–11)
- Produced by: Katsuhiko Hasegawa (#1–7); Haruki Kadokawa (#8–11); Masayuki Katō
- Written by: Tadashi Hayakawa (#1–7); Katsuhiko Chiba (#8–11)
- Music by: Falcom Sound Team J.D.K.
- Studio: Urban Product (#1–4); Tokyo Kids (#5–11)
- Released: November 21, 1989 – July 21, 1993
- Runtime: 30 minutes (each)
- Episodes: 11

Ys (イース, Īsu) consists of two separate original video animation (acronym: OVA) series based on the Ys video game franchise.

Ys I: Ancient Ys Vanished is the first OVA series. It spans seven episodes and adapts the plot of the debut game, Ys I. However, it is released as two separate retail volumes. The first volume (called Book One) features episodes 1-4, while the second volume (called Book Two) features episodes 5-7. The story follows adventurer Adol Christin after he arrives on the isolated island of Esteria. There, he discovers that a rogue priest named Dark Fact is tearing the land apart to find six mystical artifacts known as the Books of Ys.

The four-episode sequel series, Ys II: Castle in the Heavens, adapts the second game, Ys II, and begins immediately after Dark Fact's defeat. Adol is transported to the floating island of Ys to uncover the true origin of the magical books. Upon arrival, he is nursed back to health by a local girl named Lilia. Together with his allies, Adol must stop the wizard Dalles from resurrecting the ancient demon god Darm.

While the OVA series are anime adaptations of the video games (Ys I & Ys II), they do not share respective names. The sequel series has a completely different name to avoid confusion because "Book Two" is already used in the first series.

== Episodes ==
=== Book One (episodes 1–4) ===
1. "Prologue" – Overrun by monsters, the island of Esteria has become isolated from the rest of the world. A dark vortex surrounds the island, preventing any ships from entering or leaving its waters. A young adventurer, Adol Christin, hears of this and journeys to the port town of Proma Rock and seeks passage to the island. In the town he meets a sea captain named Norton who gives him a job on the docks, promising to help Adol get to Esteria in return. After working for Norton for some time, Norton gives Adol a small boat with which to sail to Esteria. Adol heads that way, but the vortex destroys his ship. He is shortly after found on the shores of Esteria by a local named Slaghf and nursed back to health. When he awakes, he is sent to speak with the fortuneteller Sarah Tovah who recognizes him as the hero of legend who will liberate Esteria from the forces of darkness. She gives him a crystal dagger, of which she knows nothing about but feels it will be important.
2. "The Book of Hadal" – Although somewhat skeptical of Sarah's story, Adol agrees to journey to the town of Zepik to meet with Sarah's aunt Jebah Tovah. He soon comes to a destroyed village and fears that it is all that remains of Zepik. A traveling poet, Luther Gemma, who tells him Zepik is some distance away and this village is actually former mining town, Rastin, that was destroyed when the monsters first appeared years before. Together they head to Zepik, but not before Luther wonders aloud why monsters would be so bent on stealing every last piece of silver from the destroyed village when they first struck. After arriving in Zepik, Adol meets Jevah, who is skeptical of Sarah's claim that he is the hero of legend. Despite this, she tells Adol of six ancient tomes, the Books of Ys. Each was guarded by a priest of the two goddesses that formed the island of Esteria, at that time known as Ys. Now they are each locked away in shrines throughout the island, but Jevah only knows the location of one, the Shrine of Solomon. Adol agrees to go there and, after fighting through a horde of the undead, arrives to find a young woman chained to the wall of the shrine. As he tries to free her a giant millipede (called Nygtilger in the game) attacks him. Adol defeats it, frees the young woman, and claims the first book, the Book of Hadal.
3. "The Book of Tovah" – Following after Adol, Sarah is accompanied by her cousin Goban Tovah, her friend Otto, and a girl named Leah. They arrive in Zepik before Adol returns from the Shrine of Solomon. Meanwhile, Adol learns the young woman he saved's name, Feena, and that she has amnesia and can remember nothing else. They return to Zepik and meet with Jevah. She takes the Book of Huddale and deciphers some of it, discovering that long ago there was a metal used by the ancients in their society. Adol remembers that Ruben mentioned that the monsters have sought out silver and wonders if there is a connection. Elsewhere, Sarah does some soul-searching and begins to feel guilty about getting Adol involved, but feels that fate is guiding him. Otto also helps to comfort her, revealing that the two of them are descendants of the six priests who once ruled the island. Outside of the village, two dark wizards, Jenocres and Dalles, convene and approach. Jenocres attacks two of the guards in the center of town, prompting an alarm. Once everyone is present, he smirks and makes a note of how foolish it is that every guard came to fight him. As this occurs, Dalles comes to the room Sarah is in and attacks her, turning her to stone. Both wizards then vanish. The next day, Adol is consumed with guilt over Sarah's fate when Goban appears and tells him to buck up. He gives Adol the Book of Tovah, saying Sarah had been guarding it and wanted Adol to have in case of her death. As Adol accepts the book, Jenocres appears and attacks. The two battle and Adol is about to be defeated when the crystal dagger begins to glow and strips Jenocres of his power. Adol takes the chance to finish him off, but the dagger shatters in the process. Goban hears people approaches and vanishes, but not before he informs Adol that he cannot stay because he is a thief. The next day, the town is holding a harvest festival, but Otto, Slaghf, and Adol aren't interested, instead staying in Sarah's room bemoaning her fate and trying to figure out what to do next. As they discuss, Leah appears and is drawn to Sarah's crystal ball. As she gazes into it, she declares that Adol must go to the Mines of Rastin in order to recover the third book, the Book of Dabby.
4. "The Book of Dabby" – In his dark fortress, Dark Fact is seen speaking with Dalles. Dalles informs him of Adol, but Dark Fact blows him off, stating he doesn't believe in "moldy old legends". One of Dalles' familiars enters the sanctuary and informs the wizard that Adol has journeyed to the Mines of Rastin. Dark Fact wonders how he would know to go there, but doesn't worry because his guardian, Vajullion, should be able to handle a single warrior. Elsewhere, Feena is seen praying to the goddesses when she is struck by a vision of a statue of the older one that looks exactly like her. Frightened, she flees the temple, both wanting to know who she is and simultaneously fearing that knowledge. Meanwhile, deep in the mines, Adol is accompanied by his friend Dogi. The two fight their way through a number of skeletons. After the fight, Adol tells Dogi that Reah asked him to try to find her silver harmonica which she lost in these mines years ago. The two continue on, but soon run into some human-like soldiers. During this fight, they punch a hole in the ceiling and the mine begins to flood. The two are washed through the mine, down to its lowest level. There, they find an underground shrine. They enter and are immediately attacked by the demon Vajullion. After a lengthy battle, the two defeat the monster and claim the Book of Dabby, along with Leah's silver harmonica. The two return to Zepik and return to Leah her silver harmonica. As soon as she touches it a flood of memories hit her. She thanks Adol and offers to play him a song, which in turn restores to Feena her memories as she cries outside the temple. Remembering everything, Feena has a look of worry on her face.

=== Book Two (episodes 5–7) ===
1. "The Book of Messa" – In the Tower of Darm, Dark Fact realizes that the goddesses have returned. Elsewhere, Adol meets back up with Goban and asks about the Tower of Darm. Adol is convinced the remaining books are there, but Goban tries to dissuade him from going there. Adol decides to drop it for the night and goes to bed, but is visited in his dreams by a being called Loda. He asks Goban about it the next morning and is told Loda is a tree with a soul that houses the memories of the goddesses. As they talk, Dogi arrives and informs them that Luther has gone missing. Immediately Dark Fact appears and informs Adol that he has captured Luther, along with the Book of Messa. Dark Fact challenges Adol to retrieve it from an abandoned temple in the nearby forest. Adol accepts and the party sets out. Meanwhile, Feena and Leah, now with their memories restored, decide it is time to "awaken". Cutting back to Adol and his party, the trio journeys to the Tree of Loda. There, Loda recounts the history of Esteria and the metal claria. Claria, it seems, is a type of silver that has magical properties, but also has the drawback of summoning evil to it. It can, however, do great damage against evil beings. Loda then bestows upon Adol an armor of Cleria and tells him to recover the remaining three books. The group moves on to the old temple and are attacked by a giant praying mantis (called Pictimos in the game). Elsewhere, Jevah discovers that Feena is one of the goddesses, as she disappears into the night in order to hook up with Leah and fulfill their destiny. Back at the temple, Adol defeats the giant beast and recovers the Book of Messa. As he looks at the cover, he comes to the realization that he can now read the ancient text.
2. "The Book of Gemma" – As the goddesses fly towards the Tower of Darm, Dark Fact and Dalles discuss the nature of evil. Dark Fact contends that wherever there is good, there must be evil and good will never be able to fully overcome the darkness. Dalles agrees, then attacks the two goddesses as they are some distance off, capturing Leah. Back in the forest, Adol decides it is time to go to the Tower of Darm and is accompanied by Dogi and Goban. They enter the tower and are immediately in combat. Meanwhile, back in the village, Slaghf futilely argues against disbanding the army. Most of the villagers believe that the monsters are gone and that Adol must have already succeeded. In actuality, Dark Fact withdrew his forces hoping for that conclusion and plans to attack later that night. Back in the tower, Adol becomes separated from the others when he is sucked into a mirror, but finds Luther. Luther tells Adol the names of all six priests, including Fact, and how Dark Fact was once one of the most devoted followers of the goddesses, but was corrupted by the Cleria. He then tells Adol about the legend in detail of the hero who will save the island. When he finishes, Luther gives Adol the Book of Gemma and the two continue on through the tower. They soon are reunited with Dogi and Goban and fight through the floors. Eventually they encounter a snake-like rock monster (called Khonsclard in the game). Adol utilizes the power of the Cleria to defeat it, but once it is destroyed Luther, Dogi, and Goban vanish. Adol is left alone, but the voice of Feena urges him to press onward and tells him the way to the top of the tower.
3. "The Book of Fact" – Dark Fact's army begins their assault on the remaining human settlements as Adol continues up the Tower of Darm. In his throne room, Dark Fact tells Dalles that he turned to evil because he feels that humans do not deserve to be saved. Below them, Adol reaches the second highest floor. Feena tells Adol to touch one of the mirrors in this room to teleport to the throne room, but before he can Dalles appears and attacks. Adol defeats Dalles, who is apparently vaporized, and continues on. He finds Leah and saves her, allowing her to return to her sister. The two goddesses then teleport to another section of the tower where Dogi, Luther, and Goban are and thank them for all they've done. The five then teleport to the throne room and confront Dark Fact. Dark Fact accuses the goddesses of causing all this evil by giving humans the Black Pearl, the artifact that allowed them to harvest Cleria in the first place. Goban and Luther step up and argue that it is human mistakes that caused the evil, not the goddesses. Dark Fact laughs and teleports out of his throne room, saying he must go fight Adol and doesn't care about the rest of them. On top of the tower, Adol and Dark Fact battle while below the goddesses destroy Dark Fact's throne and reveal the Black Pearl. They sacrifice themselves in order to destroy it, which instantly kills every monster on the island. Back atop the tower, Dark Fact realizes this and drops his sword. He tells Adol that the world is saved and that good has triumphed. He then asks Adol to kill him as that is want he wanted as well, and if he is not killed than the darkness will force him to continue to fight for evil. Adol hesitates, but then kills Dark Fact, prompting the priest to thank him before he expires. The final tome, the Book of Fact, appears and Adol claims it. The six books light up and their power destroys the vortex around the island, restores Sarah, and teleports Adol to the floating island of Ys.

=== Castle in the Heavens (episodes 8–11) ===
1. "Fallen Paradise" (失楽園) – Adol is flown to the floating island of Ys by the twin goddesses, Feena and Reah. After a violent arrival, he sees a bunch of monsters, and passes out. When he comes to, he awakes in the Doctor's office in the village of Lance with all his equipment and armor are gone except for the six books of Ys. His injuries have healed, and the doctor, noticing the books, comments about the mine. A young girl by the name of Lilia (Lilian in the English dub) tells about the abandoned mines of Rastini, and how she found a shrine in there. She offers to guide Adol, but he declines her offer, claiming it to be too dangerous. He travels off, but before he leaves, a villager named Sadah gives him a sword. While Adol's in the mines, he falls down a chasm, and ends up in the shrine he was looking for in the first place. At the same time, a group of monsters arrive in Lance Village to select the next human sacrifice. At the last moment, Lilia shields the intended victim and is chosen as the sacrifice. Despite the objections of her mother Banoa and the other villagers, Lilia goes with the monsters of her own free will. Deep in the underground Toal Sanctuary, Dark Fact appears before Adol. Instead of the evil sorcerer terrorizing Esteria in the previous OVA, he has reformed to the side of good, and gives Adol some more back story about the Black Pearl. He then gives Adol the power of the Six Priests, enabling him to use magic. When Adol returns to Lance Village, he finds out that the villagers have been offering human sacrifices to monsters to maintain peace. When he finds out Lilia's going to be the next sacrifice, he's determined to rescue her, much to the chagrin of the village elder. He reaches Lilia, who by that point is willing to sacrifice herself for the good of the village. Adol charges in and starts attacking the monster who's in charge of the sacrifice, Velagunder. Velagunder tosses Adol aside easily, and destroys his sword. Adol hears Fact's voice, and uses a fire spell against Velagunder, destroying him. When he brings Lilia back to the village, everyone is enraged because of the defiance against the monsters. Adol proceeds to tell them about the world outside of Ys, which enrages the villagers further to the point of knocking him unconscious and preparing Adol to be offered as a sacrifice.
2. "The End of the World" (世界果つるところ) – Feena and Reah, the two goddesses of Ys, their fate is revealed as they arrive in a destroyed shrine located in the glacier part of Ys, known as the Noltia Ice Wall. Lilia springs Adol out of his imprisonment in the village, as repayment for rescuing her previously, and the two run towards the glacier which is forbidden for the rest of the villagers to enter. Four villagers defy this law, and pursue Adol and Lilia into the glacier. Adol convinces the four to spare the lives temporarily so they may see for themselves past the glacier that the world does not end, but continues far into the horizon. They rest at the shrine where Feena and Reah made themselves home at. Lilia stays to rest with Feena and Reah while the four villagers and Adol head to the other side of the glacier. While they're away, the girls are attacked by Dalles, a wizard working for Darm. Feena and Reah tell Lilia to run, and give her a pendant to give to Adol when she sees him again. Lilia runs while Feena and Reah are taken before Darm, and are imprisoned inside a crystal. While Lilia's running, a group of monsters attack her, but one of the beasts turns on his comrades, allowing Lilia to escape from them and run where Adol was bound to be. Meanwhile, Adol and the villagers reach the other side, only to have their view of the surface be blocked by clouds. The villagers are about to smite Adol, when a monster comes up and tells the villagers to leave Adol to him, and to walk away. Adol begs for a sword, but the villagers comply to the monster's wishes, and leave Adol to his fate. Adol calls upon the power of the priests once again, and fights with magic fire balls. One of the villagers gets a change of heart, and decides to run back to help Adol out. The others follow suit, and as Adol and the monster are colliding projectiles, the clouds clear away to prove to the villagers that there is a world outside of Ys. The villagers start helping Adol fight the monster, to which Adol finishes off with a huge fire ball. Once they're done, a fatigued Lilia approaches the gang, and tells them the fate of the goddesses, and that they've been taken to Temple of Solomon. Adol gets determined to rescue them, and heads towards the village of Ramia and the Temple of Solomon. A jealous Lilia holds on to the pendant, and the villagers head back to Lance, carrying the injured Lilia.
3. "Wandering and Straying" (彷徨、そして迷走...) – It opens with a flashback of Keith's sister being sacrificed to the monsters by the tolling of the bells. Keith rushes in and slays the beast who turns out to be his sister that was transformed into the beast. The monsters laugh at his folly, and transform Keith into a beast. Back in the present, Adol approaches a bridgeman who won't let the bridge down for Adol to go to the village of Ramia because his son, Tarf, has been kidnapped. Adol rushes off to rescue Tarf, who meanwhile has befriended his cellmate, the traitorous monster Keith who's been chained up in the prison. Adol sneaks his way into the prison, steals a sword from a guard, and slices everyone down. Adol finds Tarf, and is about to rescue the boy when he's attacked by a slug monster. Adol's sword is immediately dissolved by the monster's blood, and Adol starts throwing energy balls at the creature. Keith sees Adol in peril, and breaks out to help him. He attacks the monster and holds him off long enough for Adol to cast a huge energy ball into the mouth of the creature, killing it. Keith rushes off afterwards while Adol takes Tarf back to the bridgeman who gladly lets him cross, and also gives him some Cleria armor as a reward. On the other side, Adol finds Ramia destroyed, and finds out the monsters had come and captured most of the villagers of Ramia. One of the villagers from Lance that travelled with Adol rushes into Ramia, and tells Adol he and another villager, Sadah, had escaped from Lance which had also been attacked by monsters, and most of the villagers including Lilia were captured as well. Sadah took a Cleria sword, and rushed off by himself towards the Temple of Solomon. Adol resolves to head to Solomon Shrine with nothing but his spells. Adol meets with Sada, and Sadah informs Adol that his girlfriend, Maria, is the next to be sacrificed, and that if the bell rings five times, she's a goner. Adol and Sadah reach the top, but not in time, and Adol finds the wizard, Dalles, up there. Adol wonders how he's still alive, and Dalles sneers and turns all the prisoners and Sada to stone. Lilia's the only one who's not turned to stone because of the goddess pendant she's carrying. Dalles runs off after Adol's barrage of spells that had no effect. Adol, enraged, picks up the Cleria sword, and declares his intent to kill all the monsters. Feena and Reah who are still crystallized hear Adol's thoughts, and start to panic because Adol is starting to go corrupt and evil with those kinds of thoughts. They summon Dogi, Goban Tovah, and Luther Genma to Ys to seek out Adol and help him. Meanwhile, Lilia runs into Keith who she recognizes as the monster who saved her last episode, and Keith tries to stop Lilia from going after Adol, but they are interrupted when they see Dogi, Goban, and Luther being teleported to a room nearby.
4. "On the Path to Destiny" (運命の流れる中で) – Darm begins powering up to bring evil to the world while Dogi, Goban, and Luther arrive in Ys, and start conversing with the goddesses who communicate with them through a goddess statue. They ultimately decide to destroy the black pearl to eliminate evil altogether. They hand Luther a golden harmonica, and tell him to climb to the top of the bell tower, and play the goddess tune that Adol knows. Keith and Lilia walk into the room, and Keith goes berserk after hearing the plan to destroy evil. Dogi holds off Keith, and Lilia begs them all to stop fighting. When Luther tells them he doesn't know the goddess tune, they tell him to seek out Adol. Dalles enters the room and destroys the goddess statue. Keith breaks up his fight with Dogi and starts attacking Dalles. Dalles quickly fends off Keith, and goes off to meet Adol. Keith almost attacks Lilia, but calms himself down at the last minute. Lilia tells Luther to give her the harmonica because she knows the tune the goddesses spoke of. She runs off to climb the tower while Keith chases after her to try to stop her. The other three head off to find Adol. Dalles finds Adol's first, and attacks him relentlessly. Adol finds out from Dalles that Darm is the one in charge, and just as Dalles is about to kill Adol, Darm kills Dalles for outliving his usefulness, and tries to tempt Adol to join him in creating an evil utopia. Keith catches up to Lilia, and reveals to her that if she succeeds in destroying evil, she will disappear as well since Keith reveals that her mother came to him in the past when Lilia was an extremely ill baby, and he fell in love with the mother immediately. He agreed to help save Lilia's life, and to do so, he had to sacrifice a monster, and infuse her with monster blood, which is the reason she didn't turn to stone. Darm starts trying to take complete control of ALL monsters, and Keith starts going berserk while Lilia gets affected as well from the monster blood in her, and starts going weak. Keith loses himself, and starts to attack Lilia, but regains a little bit of consciousness at the last moment, and kills himself before he hurts Lilia. Lilia works past the pain, and works her way to the top where she sees the stone Sadah. She starts playing the melody which allows Adol to regain himself, and turns all the petrified villagers back to normal. Darm gains full power, and decides to have Lilia be his new ally instead of Adol, so he transports Lilia to him. Lilia still had a good heart though, and with the help of the goddess pendant, dispels the power of the Black Pearl, destroying Darm and his magic. Ys starts going back to the ground with the power of the Black Pearl that was keeping it afloat gone. Goban, Dogi, and Luther call on the power of the Priests to help guide Ys back to the original crater it came from in Esteria. Ys safely lands back in Esteria, and the goddesses take the Black Pearl and ascend to the heavens instead of destroying the pearl and becoming human. Maria ends up being revived, and her and Sadah get married. As Lilia watches the wedding parade, Maria tosses her the bouquet, and Lilia catches it. It ends with Lilia seeing Adol sail off to a new adventure.

== Book Three ==
Nihon Falcom Corporation and Marvelous Entertainment were producing a new, four episode OVA series based on the Ys universe. The first episode was set for a late 2006 debut in Japan, but was never released.

== Availability ==
Both series are available on DVD in English, having been released by Anime Works / Media Blasters. They can be purchased separately, or in a three-disc box set, entitled Ys Legacy. The English releases are the subject of some contention, since the dubbed audio track has multiple and frequent changes to the music and character names ("Dark Fact" changed to "Dark Factor" and "Lilia" changed to "Lillian", for instance), and pronunciations of various names are inconsistent, sometimes within the same scene.

Included on one of the discs is what appears to be a preview for an anime based around Ys IV: The Dawn of Ys. This was created by Falcom as a "pitch" trailer to shop around to various animation studios, to see if anyone was interested in producing the series. They had no takers, however, so this trailer is all that exists of the rumored Ys TV series.

The series was released in Japan as a Laserdisc 4-disc box set.
