= Ys Origin =

2006 video game

- Developer: Nihon Falcom
- Publishers: JP: Nihon Falcom; WW: Xseed Games; WW: Dotemu (consoles)
- Director: Toshihiro Kondo
- Producer: Masayuki Kato
- Programmers: Takayuki Kusano; Kazuhiko Onoda; Homare Karusawa
- Writers: Hisayoshi Takeiri; Shinichiro Sakamoto; Yoshihiro Konda
- Composers: Hayato Sonoda; Takahiro Unisuga; Ryo Takeshita
- Series: Ys
- Platforms: Windows; PlayStation 4; PlayStation Vita; Xbox One; Nintendo Switch
- Release: December 21, 2006: Windows; JP: December 21, 2006; WW: May 31, 2012 PlayStation 4; WW: February 21, 2017 PlayStation Vita; WW: May 30, 2017 Xbox One; WW: April 11, 2018 Switch; WW: October 1, 2020
- Genre: Action role-playing
- Mode: Single-player

Ys Origin is a 2006 action role-playing game by Nihon Falcom. It was first released for Windows in Japan with an English release by Xseed Games in 2012. Dotemu later released the game for PlayStation 4 and PlayStation Vita in 2017, for Xbox One in 2018, and for Nintendo Switch in 2020.

Ys Origin is a prequel to the previous installments of the Ys video game series. It takes place 700 years before the events of Ys I, and tells much of the backstory of Ys, Darm Tower, the Black Pearl, the twin goddesses, and the six priests. The game has three playable characters: Yunica Tovah, Hugo Fact, and Toal Fact. By completing the game with each of the characters, the player sees more dimensions to the story. Each player character has a distinctive story, combat style and skillset. Ys Origin is the first game in the Ys series in which Adol Christin is not the protagonist. The game also differs in some respect as it is a straightforward dungeon crawl, taking place entirely within a single location.

== Gameplay ==
Ys Origin features three characters with various fighting styles. Yunica is able to wield axes and greatswords with ease. In addition to standard hack-and-slash combos, Yunica is also able to perform various aerial maneuvers such as the down-thrust and up-thrust from previous Ys games, as well as a crippling lunge attack. Hugo Fact can fire energy from his wand and his "Eyes of Fact" alike, he can often fill the screen with destructive power, mowing down all enemies in his path before they have a chance to get anywhere near him. With good timing, he can pull off a crippling "power shot", generating a debilitating pillar of pure magic with a wider area of effect. The Claw is a short-range/high damage character geared towards the more experienced players.

All playable characters have a "Boost Meter" that slowly fills as the game progresses. Once this meter has reached capacity, that character can be temporarily "Boosted" for quicker and stronger attacks and far greater defense. Once certain conditions have been reached during gameplay, boosted characters can utilize a special move called "Burst" that quickly depletes their Boost meter in favor of an ultra-powerful, extremely wide-ranging release of highly destructive energy.

== Story ==
=== Setting ===
There once was a wildly prosperous land named Ys, ruled by the twin Goddesses Reah and Feena and their six priestly retainers. It was a veritable paradise, with all its residents able to enact miracles at will through the use of magic – a power granted them by a holy artifact known as the Black Pearl. One day, without warning, enormous demons marched upon the land, bringing death and devastation in their wake. Their numbers and their might were too much for the knights and sorcerers of Ys to handle, so the people sought shelter within their holiest of temples at the top of the tallest mountain. In a desperate attempt to keep these people safe, the twin Goddesses used the power of the Black Pearl to tear this temple from the ground and raise it into the heavens, away from the ever-growing threat below.

The demons were determined, however. They erected an enormous tower from which further attacks were launched, bringing the battle into the skies. An all-out war had begun, with forces concentrated in Solomon Shrine above and the Devil's Tower below. And it was amidst this chaos that the twin Goddesses stole away into the night. No one was told of their departure – not even the Six Priests who served them. It seemed clear that they'd gone back to the surface, but no one knew exactly why. Only one thing was certain: without the Goddesses, Ys could not survive. Intent on finding their missing deities, the Six Priests organized a search party of the most elite knights and sorcerers in the land. These soldiers were given a single mission: secure the safety of Ladies Reah and Feena, and bring them back to Solomon Shrine alive and well, but in the desolate, ruined remains of Ys, there's only one place they could have gone: the Devil's Tower itself.

=== Characters ===
- Yunica Tovah (ユニカ＝トバ, Yunika Toba): Yunica is the granddaughter of Priest Tovah, one of the six priests of Ys. She begins the game armed with a battle axe, but later acquires a fire sword. The axe allows for rapid attack sequences, whereas the sword affords a wider reach. Although unable to cast any kind of magic by herself, she can use wind or thunder magic with her axe when she has the required magical artifacts that contain the spells to be cast, and fire magic with her sword when she finds it. Yunica's gameplay is comparable to Adol's in The Oath in Felghana and The Ark of Napishtim.
- Hugo Fact (ユーゴ＝ファクト, Yūgo Fakuto): The magician Hugo attacks by emitting magic missiles from his staff and from his two small satellites, the Eyes of Fact.
- The Claw (鉤爪の男, Kagizume no Otoko): The Claw is a character surrounded in mystery; he attacks rapidly, wielding two large metal claws.
- Adol Christin (アドル＝クリスティン, Adoru Kurisutin): The expansion disk and later editions of the game add Adol to the roster of player characters in the Time Attack and Arena Mode bonus games. The player can choose to play Adol as he appeared either in The Ark of Napishtim or in The Oath in Felghana. Each variation plays as it did in the original game, but with control mechanics adjusted for parity with the other three characters.

== Release ==
Ys Origin was originally released on December 21, 2006, for Windows XP. An expansion disc was made available to owners of the first edition (a serial number had to be provided to request the upgrade). The expansion disc added two new difficulty levels, an arena mode, alternate versions of the three main characters with upgraded skills, the ability to play as Adol Christin (in Time Attack and Arena Mode only), and a few additional secrets. The retail version has been re-released three times in order to support new Windows operating systems: Vista in 2007, 7 in 2010, and 8 in 2013.

Xseed Games released the game through Steam on May 31, 2012. On top of the enhancements from the expansion disc, this release added a fully localized translation, proper widescreen support, Steam achievements, enhanced game pad support, and cloud save support. By January 2015, this version of the game had sold over 200,000 copies worldwide. The game was later released DRM-free on GOG.com and Humble Store as well.

Developer and publisher Dotemu ported Ys Origin to various consoles. Featuring most enhancements from the Steam release, the ports also add localization to French, Italian, German, and Spanish, in addition to English (using Xseed's translation) and Japanese. The PlayStation 4 version was released on February 21, 2017. The PlayStation Vita version was planned to release alongside it, but was delayed to May 30. A version for Xbox One launched on April 11, 2018 with new content, such as blood level options and a speedrun mode. The Nintendo Switch version followed on October 1, 2020, both digitally, and in limited standard and collector's editions.

== Reception ==
Reception

Aggregate score
| Aggregator | Score |
|---|---|
| Metacritic | PC: 76/100; PS4: 77/100; XONE: 81/100; NS: 82/100 |

Review scores
| Publication | Score |
|---|---|
| Destructoid | 8.5/10 |
| Eurogamer | 7/10 |
| PC Gamer (UK) | 71/100 |

The game received "generally favorable reviews" across all platforms according to review aggregator Metacritic. Richard Cobbett from PC Gamer rated Ys Origin a 71 out of 100 and called it "a cute, quirky anime dungeon crawl that will cheerfully kick your arse until your nose starts bleeding". Dale North from Destructoid awarded it an 8.5 out of 10 and commented that "$20 gets you a thoroughly enjoyable PC RPG that both looks and sounds great, despite its age. You'll get about 10 hours of entertaining gameplay, really strong narrative (for a Ys game [sic]), and a great localization to go with it".
