= Ys VI: The Ark of Napishtim =

2003 video game

- Developer: Nihon Falcom (Note: Konami developed the PlayStation 2 and PSP versions.)
- Publishers: Nihon Falcom; Konami (PS2 & PSP); Taito (Mobile); Xseed Games (PC)
- Composers: Hayato Sonoda; Wataru Ishibashi
- Series: Ys
- Platforms: Windows; Mobile; PlayStation 2; PlayStation Portable
- Release: September 27, 2003: Windows; JP: September 27, 2003; WW: April 28, 2015 Mobile; JP: July 2, 2004 (SoftBank); JP: March 22, 2005 (i-mode); JP: January 19, 2006 (EZweb) PlayStation 2; NA: February 22, 2005; JP: March 10, 2005; EU: September 16, 2005 PlayStation Portable; JP: January 19, 2006; NA: February 28, 2006; EU: September 29, 2006; AU: October 6, 2006
- Genre: Action role-playing
- Mode: Single-player

Ys VI: The Ark of Napishtim (Note: Ys VI: The Ark of Napishtim (イース6 -ナピシュテムの匣-, Īsu Shikkusu -Napishutemu no Hako-)) is a 2003 action role-playing game developed by Nihon Falcom. It was first released for Windows before being ported by Konami to the PlayStation 2 in 2005 and the PlayStation Portable in 2006.

The Ark of Napishtim was the first English release of the series since Ys III: Wanderers from Ys in the early 1990s and the first to be released in Europe since Ys I: Ancient Ys Vanished. A Windows version was released by Xseed Games in 2015. Ys VI was used as a base for Ys Online: The Ark of Napishtim, a free-to-play MMORPG that was released in the early 2020s.

== Gameplay ==
Ys VI expands on the mechanics introduced in Ys III and V, in that players are given much more control over Adol including the ability to jump and control his attacks and various magics. Areas are presented in 3D graphics. Character, monster and minor bosses are presented using pre-rendered 3D sprites. Larger bosses are presented using full 3D models.

== Plot ==
The story begins after Adol's ship is attacked by a fleet of Romun ships. Forced to sail into an unknown area, they encounter a large storm. Adol is swept off the vessel while trying to rescue a fellow sailor and washed ashore by the vortex that surrounds the Canaan Islands. He is found, unconscious, by the nieces of the chieftain of the nearby Rehda village, Olha and Isha, who are the daughters of his brother that died when battling with fellow Redha against the Wandering Calamity. The girls take him to their village and lay him to rest in their Uncle Ord's house. Adol hears them talking about him and wakes up briefly, afterwards going back to sleep because of his exhaustion. His adventure then begins.

== Releases ==
=== Windows ===
The initial release of the game was the "Limited Edition". After this sold out, Falcom released a standard edition of the game with some new features. Two new difficulties and a Time Attack mini-game where the player fights through all the game's bosses were added. No patch or upgrade was released to initial buyers however, so players wanting these new features had to buy the game again. Years later, Falcom would similarly add features to Ys Origin; this time, initial buyers were offered an upgrade disc for the cost of shipping. The game was later released by Xseed Games via Steam on April 28, 2015.

=== PlayStation 2 ===
Konami made several additions and changes when porting the game to the PlayStation 2. The most notable were the inclusion of both English and Japanese voice acting to all characters (including NPCs) and several new optional areas referred to as "Alma's Trials". While the Japanese voice acting could be selected in the NTSC-U version, the PAL version had all Japanese voice acting removed. Konami also added new FMV sequences, though the original animated sequences could still be selected through a code. Blood and gore effects were removed due to console games requiring a rating. Lastly, they changed the character and monster graphics from pre-rendered 3D sprites to fully polygonal 3D models. While this allowed for much better animation, it also changed Adol's appearance based on his equipment.

=== PlayStation Portable ===
The PlayStation Portable port does not include any of the changes of the PS2 port except for the removal of blood and gore effects. The European and North American versions came with a new set of bonuses including some extra fetch-quests that unlock a few mini-games and an image/media gallery. These were later included in a "Special Edition" re-release in Japan, although the game is noted for having particularly long and frequent load times. Voice-acting was never included in this version. It is not available digitally on the PlayStation Store, only through a physical UMD copy, which has no PlayStation trophies attached.

=== Ys Online: The Ark of Napishtim ===
Ys Online: The Ark of Napishtim is a free-to-play MMORPG based on Ys VI, produced by Restar Games (Fosun Group), which comprised the Japan-facing publishing team of Beijing Rekoo. It was first released as Ys VI Online on Android and iOS in Japan on July 20, 2021. A Southeast Asian version published by VNG Games was released on May 6, 2022, followed by a global version published by ZLONGAME on August 30, 2022.

== Reception ==
Reception

Aggregate score
Aggregator	Score		
Aggregator	PC	PS2	PSP
Metacritic	76/100	72/100	64/100

Review scores
Publication	Score		
Publication	PC	PS2	PSP
Electronic Gaming Monthly	N/A	7.33/10	N/A
Eurogamer	N/A	6/10	N/A
Famitsu	N/A	24/40	N/A
Game Informer	N/A	7.5/10	6.75/10
GamePro	N/A	4/5 stars	N/A
GameRevolution	N/A	C	N/A
GameSpot	N/A	7.5/10	6.7/10
GameSpy	N/A	4/5 stars	2.5/5 stars
GameZone	N/A	7.9/10	6.8/10
IGN	N/A	7.8/10	5.6/10
Official U.S. PlayStation Magazine	N/A	3.5/5 stars	3/5 stars
Detroit Free Press	N/A	3/4 stars	N/A

The PS2 and PSP versions received "mixed or average reviews", while the PC version later received "generally favorable reviews", all according to video game review aggregator Metacritic. In Japan, Famitsu gave the PS2 version a score of one six, one seven, one six, and one five, for a total of 24 out of 40.
