= Ys V: Lost Kefin, Kingdom of Sand =

1995 video game

- Super Famicom cover art
- Developers: Nihon Falcom; Access (PS2)
- Publishers: Nihon Falcom; Koei (Ys V Expert); Taito (PS2)
- Director: Tadashi Hayakawa
- Producer: Masayuki Kato
- Artists: Minako Iwasaki; Kazuo Nakamura
- Composers: Naoki Kaneda; Satoshi Arai; Atsushi Shirakawa
- Series: Ys
- Platforms: Super Famicom, PlayStation 2
- Release: Super Famicom: JP: December 29, 1995; JP: March 22, 1996 (Ys V Expert); PlayStation 2: JP: March 30, 2006
- Genre: Action role-playing
- Mode: Single-player

Ys V: Lost Kefin, Kingdom of Sand is a 1995 action role-playing game developed by Nihon Falcom. It is the fifth game in the Ys series of video games and was released for the Super Famicom in December 1995. A remake by Access and Taito was released for the PlayStation 2 in 2006.

== Plot ==
Adol is traveling through new lands, in search of more adventure, when he hears of the vanished desert city of Kefin. He sets off to investigate this ancient city's disappearance.

== Gameplay ==
The RPG-style statistical elements and the overhead view of most of the previous games are retained in Ys V. As in Ys III, there is no auto-attack; the player must press a button to swing Adol's sword. Adol is also given the ability to jump and defend with his shield. A new magic system is introduced in Ys V as well, which requires the player to charge up spells by holding a button before they can be cast. Adol must level up physical skills and magical skills separately.

== Release ==
Reception

Review scores
Publication	Score
Famitsu	8/10, 7/10, 6/10, 5/10
Super GamePower	4/5

Ys V was originally released on December 29, 1995 in Japan for the Super Famicom. The following year, Falcom released a second version of the game with a higher difficulty level, known as Ys V Expert. A remake was developed by Access and published by Taito for the PlayStation 2 on March 30, 2006. An English fan translation of the SNES version was created by Aeon Genesis and released in 2013. An English fan translation of the PS2 version led by Kaisaan was released in 2026.

D4 Enterprise plans to re-release the SNES version as part of a collection in 2026 for the Microsoft Windows.

Four writers for Famitsu reviewed the Super Famicom version of the game. One reviewer complimented the game with its story being well paced and that it would likely be overshadowed by more popular titles. Other reviewers commented on the gameplay. While on applauded the alchemy system, they found the combat to be repetitive. Another said that compared to Zelda, the action elements are weak. One reviewer said the game just had the impression of an old-fashioned RPG, specifically with the graphics and sound quality and dated gameplay like not knowing armor and weapons would increase your stats compared to the equipped armor or not.

== Reception ==
Japanese publication Famitsu gave the original SFC version of the game a score of 26 out of 40. Famitsu also scored the PS2 release of Ys V a 28 out of 40. Super GamePower gave it a 4/5.
