= Ys: The Oath in Felghana =

2005 video game

- Developer: Nihon Falcom
- Publisher: Xseed Games: JP: Nihon Falcom
- Director: Takayuki Kusano
- Producer: Masayuki Kato
- Writers: Hisayoshi Takeiri; Toshihiro Kondo; Shinichiro Sakamoto; Hirotaka Sato
- Composer: Yukihiro Jindo
- Series: Ys
- Platforms: Windows, PlayStation Portable, Nintendo Switch, PlayStation 4, PlayStation 5
- Release: June 30, 2005: Windows; JP: June 30, 2005; WW: March 19, 2012 PlayStation Portable; JP: April 22, 2010; NA: November 2, 2010; EU: January 27, 2011 Memoire Switch; JP: April 27, 2023; WW: January 7, 2025 PlayStation 4, PlayStation 5; JP: May 23, 2024; WW: January 7, 2025
- Genre: Action role-playing
- Mode: Single-player

Ys: The Oath in Felghana is a 2005 action role-playing game developed by Nihon Falcom. A part of the Ys series, it is a remake of Ys III: Wanderers from Ys (1989). The Oath in Felghana was first released for Windows in Japan in June 2005, with an English localization by Xseed Games in March 2012. A PlayStation Portable version was also released in Japan in April 2010 and later in North America and Europe. A remaster, Ys Memoire: The Oath in Felghana, released in Japan in April 2023 for the Nintendo Switch and in May 2024 for PlayStation 4 and PlayStation 5. Memoire was later released internationally in January 2025.

== Synopsis ==
The basic plot was slightly modified from the original and expanded through the use of additional scenes.

== Gameplay ==
The gameplay follows the new model from Ys VI: The Ark of Napishtim, with several improvements; the original platformer-based gameplay was ditched in favor of a more conventional gameplay model. Many things from the previous game were streamlined to keep the focus on the action as opposed to equipment and item management. For example, healing item and stat bonuses are no longer carried as items or accessories; instead, these bonuses are dropped from defeated enemies and are used upon pickup along with an experience bonus for attack combos. These bonuses are maintained through constant combat.

== Development and release ==
The Oath in Felghana was first released in Japan for Windows on June 30, 2005; an unrelated remaster of the original game for the PlayStation 2 was released by Taito months prior. It later received a port for the PlayStation Portable in Japan on April 22, 2010, with an English release by Xseed Games on November 2. In order to help offset localization costs, XSEED licensed and paid for the use of a fan translation that had been produced previously for the PC version. Xseed later added the localization to the Windows version, releasing it on March 19, 2012. This version is the same as the original Japanese PC release, but added achievements and leaderboards. The English voice acting was later added to the Windows version via a free update in February 2020, along with the ability to change the soundtrack to the PC-88 or X68000 version. A remaster, Ys Memoire: The Oath in Felghana, was released in Japan for the Nintendo Switch on April 27, 2023. It features voiced dialogue for Adol, higher-quality textures and character illustrations. It was released on May 23 for PlayStation 4 and PlayStation 5. Memoire was released internationally on January 7, 2025.

The soundtrack from Ys III: Wanderers from Ys was re-arranged for this game by Yukihiro Jindo. The full 2-CD soundtrack, Ys - The Oath in Felghana - Original Sound Track, was released in 2005. Released at the same time was Ys - The Oath in Felghana - Super Arrange Version, a disc with 10 additional Oath in Felghana arrangements. The Original Sound Track and Super Arrange Version were also released together in a package known as the Ys - The Oath in Felghana - Perfect Collection. Ys: The Oath in Felghana Musical Selections is a collection of 23 songs from the game that Xseed Games released with the Premium Edition of the North American release of the PSP port of the game.

== Reception ==
Reception

Aggregate score
Aggregator	Score
Metacritic	PSP: 80/100; PC: 73/100

Review scores
Publication	Score
GameSpot	PSP: 7.5/10
GamesRadar+	PSP: 4/5

Ys: The Oath in Felghana for PSP received "generally favorable" reviews, according to review aggregator Metacritic, garnering a score of 80/100 based on 25 critic reviews.
