= Ys (series) =

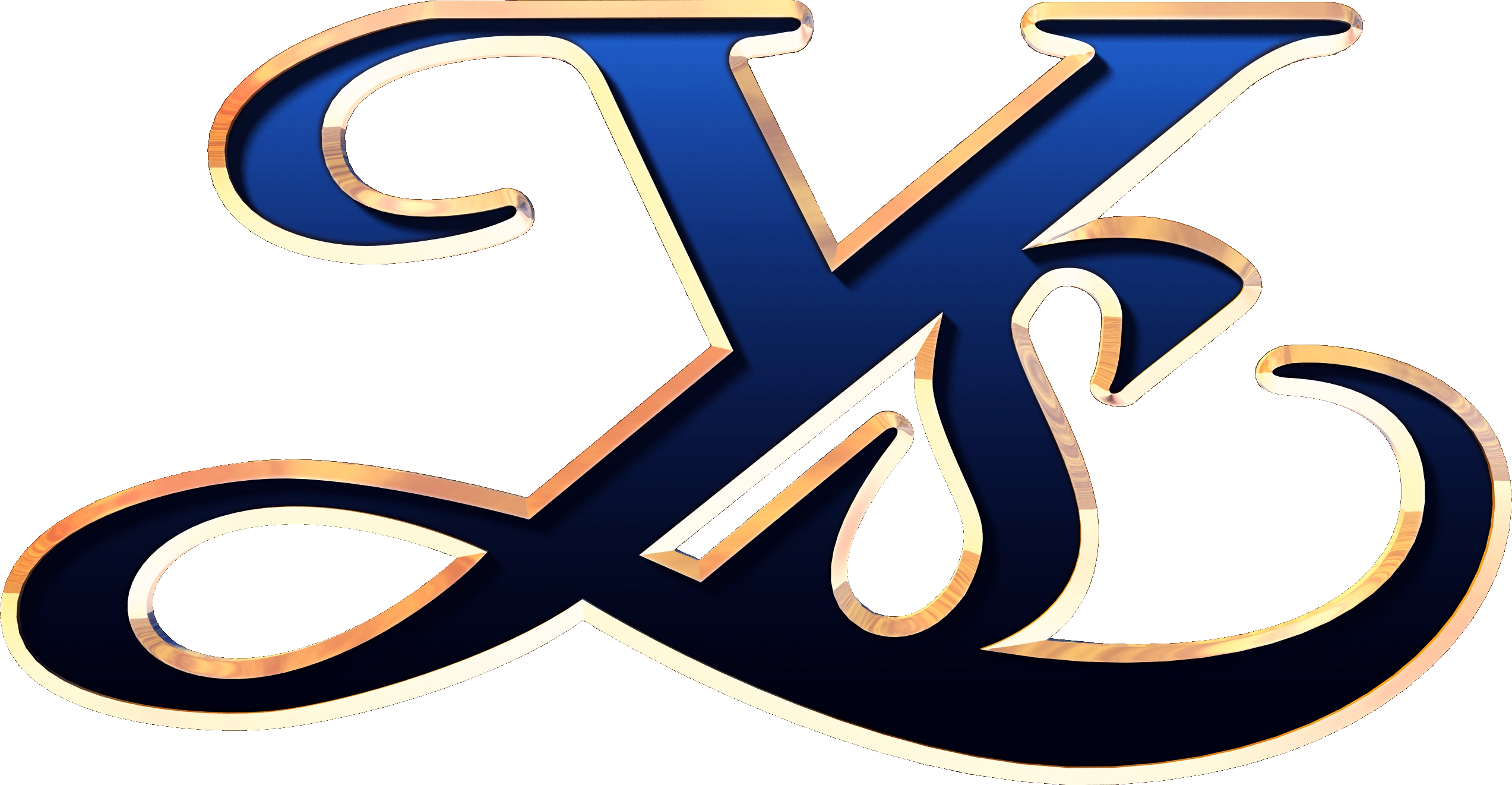
- Genre: Action role-playing
- Developer: Nihon Falcom
- Publisher: Various
- Creators: Masaya Hashimoto; Tomoyoshi Miyazaki
- Composer: Falcom Sound Team jdk
- Platforms: PC-88, PC-98, Sharp X1, MSX2, FM-7, X68000, Master System, Genesis, Saturn, NES, Super NES, Nintendo DS, Windows, PlayStation 2, PlayStation Portable, TurboGrafx-CD, Apple IIGS, mobile phones, PlayStation Vita, PlayStation 4, Nintendo Switch, Xbox One, Stadia, PlayStation 5, Nintendo Switch 2
- First release: Ys I 21 June 1987
- Latest release: Ys X: Proud Nordics; 31 July 2025

Ys (イース, Īsu; IPA: [iːsɯ]) (/ˈiːs/) is a Japanese series of action role-playing games developed by Nihon Falcom. The series chronicles the life of the adventurer Adol Christin.

The first game in the series, Ys I, was released on the NEC PC-8801 in 1987. Ys games have since been ported and released on many other platforms. As of 2017, Ys had sold over 4.8 million copies worldwide.

== Common elements ==
=== Plot ===
The Ys series chronicles the life of Adol Christin, a young man obsessed with adventure. Gameplay usually revolves around Adol, though his comrade, Dogi, is a frequent companion in his travels. More recent games in the series include several other playable party members.

A feature of the early Ys games is the Darm Tower. In the story, it is an unfinished and deserted tower, built with the intention of touching the sky. The tower houses a small annex, titled "the Tower of Rado" (or simply "Rado's Annex"), three quarters of the way up. According to in-game lore, the normally immortal ancient Ys aged because humans overused the magic power of an ancient artifact, known as the Black Pearl. The result of this misuse was evil magical energy bringing forth millions of cruel demons. The people of Ys fled to Solomon Shrine and used the Black Pearl to lift the palace into the sky, creating a safe haven. The demons, focused on controlling the Black Pearl for their own intentions, began building the Darm Tower, day and night, attempting to connect to Solomon Shrine with their construction. As in-game-events transpired, however, the demons' efforts were thwarted. Later games feature a variety of plots.

The world the series takes place in is notably geographically very similar to real-life Earth. The series is named after Ys, the floating island featured in some of the games, which was inspired by the mythical city Ys.

=== Gameplay ===
In early games, the player uses only the directional pad to fight. The player must run Adol into enemies, hitting them on the side, back or slightly off-center of the front. This was created with accessibility in mind; while other RPGs at the time had either turn-based combat or a manually activated sword, Ys had Adol automatically attack when walking into enemies. While most Ys titles do not use the 'bump attack' system, it has become one of the series' defining features. Falcom staff have compared this style of gameplay to the enjoyment of popping air bubble sheets, in the sense that it took the tedious task of level-grinding and turned it into something similar to a high-score-based arcade game.

A feature that has been used in nearly every Ys title is the health regeneration mechanism, which had previously only been used in the Hydlide series. Recharging health has since become a common mechanism used in many video games today.

Ys II introduced magic spells to the series (e.g. shooting fireballs), and the ability to transform into a monster, which allows the player to both scare human non-player characters for unique dialogues, and interact with non-boss monsters.

Ys III: Wanderers from Ys adopted side-scrolling action-adventure gameplay, similar to Falcom's own Dragon Slayer series and Nintendo's Zelda II: The Adventure of Link, with an attack button and a variety of different attacks.

Ys IV: The Dawn of Ys and Ys IV: Mask of the Sun returned to the original control scheme, while Ys IV: Mask of the Sun - A New Theory requires the player to press buttons to attack.

Ys V: Lost Kefin, Kingdom of Sand uses a top-down viewpoint and requires the player to press buttons to attack or defend with a shield.

Ys VI: The Ark of Napishtim graphically departed from its predecessors, using a mix of three-dimensional graphics and sprites. Gameplay is hack and slash generally without the ability to actively block. Ys: The Oath in Felghana and Ys Origin share this gameplay style.

Ys Seven brought back the ability to actively block, with skills, stun meters for enemies, weapon types, super combos known as EXTRA skills, and the ability to parry hits from attacks with a flash guard system. Failed flash guards result in the player character taking extra damage compared to failing to defend at all. Ys: Memories of Celceta introduces a flash dodge where a player character dodges just before a hit. Ys VIII and IX continued this style.

== Games ==
Release timeline
| 1987 | Ys I |
| 1988 | Ys II |
| 1989 | Ys III: Wanderers from Ys |
| 1989 | Ys I & II |
1990–1992
| 1993 | Ys IV: Mask of the Sun |
| 1993 | Ys IV: The Dawn of Ys |
1994
| 1995 | Ys V: Lost Kefin, Kingdom of Sand |
1996–2002
| 2003 | Ys VI: The Ark of Napishtim |
2004
| 2005 | Ys: The Oath in Felghana |
| 2006 | Ys Strategy |
| 2006 | Ys Origin |
2007–2008
| 2009 | Ys Seven |
| 2010 | Ys vs. Trails in the Sky |
2011
| 2012 | Ys: Memories of Celceta |
2013–2015
| 2016 | Ys VIII: Lacrimosa of Dana |
2017–2018
| 2019 | Ys IX: Monstrum Nox |
2020–2022
| 2023 | Ys X: Nordics |

The Ys series has its roots in the Japanese computer system NEC PC-8801. Each of the first three games was released on that platform first. Ports of the games to console platforms have usually been handled by various other licensee companies, such as Hudson Soft, Tonkin House and Konami.

The first two games in the series were originally intended as a single game, but the creators, Masaya Hashimoto and Tomoyoshi Miyazaki, eventually decided to split it into two separate games: Ys I (1987) and Ys II (1988). They were later re-released together in the enhanced remake Ys I & II (1989). It was one of the first video games to use CD-ROM, which was utilized to provide enhanced graphics, animated cutscenes, a Red Book CD-DA soundtrack, and voice acting. Its English localization was also one of the first to use voice dubbing. The game received the Game of the Year award from OMNI Magazine in 1990, as well as many other awards. The X68000 remake of Ys I released in 1991 was notable for its early use of 3D pre-rendering for the boss sprites. An MS-DOS remake called Ys II Special was also released exclusively for the South Korean market in 1994; it was a mash-up of Ys II with the anime Ys II: Castle in the Heavens (1992) along with a large amount of new content.

After completing Ys III: Wanderers from Ys (1989), Hashimoto and Miyazaki left Nihon Falcom and founded Quintet. Two versions of the fourth game were released, and Falcom licensed both versions out: the Super Famicom version to Tonkin House (who had handled the Super NES port for Ys III), titled Ys IV: Mask of the Sun; and the PC Engine CD version to Hudson Soft (who had ported all three previous games to that platform), titled Ys IV: The Dawn of Ys. Hudson Soft took certain liberties with the game, and as a result, it is very different from Mask of the Sun. They share the same setting, cast, and much of the basic plot, but the actual structure of the story plays out in a completely different manner, as do the game's levels and enemies. Mask of the Sun is the official continuation of the series, while Falcom have deemed The Dawn of Ys to be essentially an "alternate universe" take on the events in Celceta. A PS2 remake of Mask of the Sun was released in May 2005, further subtitled A New Theory.

Falcom released Ys V as a Super Famicom exclusive. A standalone title, it gave Adol a jump and manual attack. It was criticized as being too easy; in response to this, Falcom put out Ys V Expert, a harder version of the game. A PS2 remake of Ys V by Taito was released 2006 in Japan.

After this, the series remained dormant for eight years (except for remakes such as Ys Eternal), during which time Falcom abandoned console development altogether, choosing instead to focus on the Windows platform. The sixth game in the series, entitled Ys VI: The Ark of Napishtim, was released in September 2003. Ys: The Oath in Felghana, a remake of Ys III, was released in 2005. A spin-off game called Ys Strategy was released in March 2006 in Japan for the Nintendo DS. Unlike the rest of the series, it is a real-time strategy game. It received lackluster reviews and general disdain from fans.

Ys Origin was released in December 2006. It takes place 700 years before the events of the first game, following the separation of Ys from Esteria. The two initial playable characters are Yunica Tovah and Hugo Fact. The two characters' stories play out somewhat differently during character interactions. Adol appears only as a hidden bonus character. Falcom has since released a new version of the game that required a copy's registration serial number sent to Falcom along with shipping charges to get an extra enhancement disc for the game. With this disc the player would be able to play as Adol, along with various other new features. Ys Seven was released in Japan in 2009 for the PlayStation Portable. Unlike the previous entries in the series, this time the player has a party of characters fighting simultaneously against enemies on the field, and can change the controlled character on the fly with the press of a button. This system has been maintained in all subsequent games in the series. The graphics also had a significant upgrade compared to Ys Origin.

In September 2012, Ys: Memories of Celceta, a canonical remake of Ys IV, was released for the PlayStation Vita. Ys VIII: Lacrimosa of Dana was released in Japan in July 2016 for the PlayStation Vita, and was later ported to the PlayStation 4, Windows, and Nintendo Switch. Ys IX: Monstrum Nox was released on the PlayStation 4 in Japan in September 2019. It was released in North America and Europe in 2021. Ys X: Nordics was released in Japan for the PlayStation 5, PlayStation 4 and Nintendo Switch in September 2023. It features naval exploration and combat for the first time in the series.

=== English releases ===
Until 2005, only three Ys games were available in North America: Ys I (Master System, MS-DOS, Apple IIGS), Ys I & II (TurboGrafx CD), and Ys III: Wanderers from Ys (SNES, Genesis, TurboGrafx CD). The original PC-8801, PC-9801, X1 and MSX2 versions, as well as the Famicom ports, remain exclusive to Japan. English ports of the Japanese PC game Ys VI: Ark of Napishtim were released by Konami in 2005 and 2006 for the PS2 and PSP, respectively, marking the first English release of the series in 13 years.

At one point, NEC Interchannel proposed bringing DigiCube's Ys I & II: Eternal Story to North America, but the idea was rejected by Sony Computer Entertainment America.

The original Windows PC remakes were Ys Eternal and Ys II Eternal. Later, there was a compiled re-release called Ys I & II Complete, which bumped up Ys Eternal visuals to Ys II Eternal level (more color depth, primarily) and made the soundtrack sound more cohesive between the two. Once this was out of print, Falcom began selling the two separately again, as Ys I Complete and Ys II Complete. Falcom changed the "Eternal" to "Complete" on all external packaging and advertisements, but not in the actual games themselves. In one of the English patches, the internal bitmaps are edited to reflect the external change for the packages.

In 2002, Nicolas Livaditis, an avid Ys fan and software engineer, spearheaded an English fan translation project for the first PC remake, Ys I Complete. This led to other projects for Ys II Complete, Ys IV: The Dawn of Ys, Ys VI: The Ark of Napishtim, Ys: The Oath in Felghana and Ys Origin, though not all were completed; the Ys VI project for example, was cancelled to respect Konami's licensing rights. Completed translation patches were made for Ys I & II Complete and Ys IV: The Dawn of Ys. In 2010, Xseed Games purchased the fan-translated script for Ys: The Oath in Felghana from Jeff Nussbaum, the actual translator, an act considered historic and unprecedented, as unlicensed translations are technically copyright infringements as unauthorized derivative works. XSEED went on to purchase three more fan-translated scripts for Ys I, Ys II, and Ys Origin.

Nintendo added Ys Book I & II to the US Virtual Console in August 2008, the first release of the Ys series on a 7th generation home console. Atlus released the games in one package entitled Legacy of Ys: Books I & II in February 2009 on the Nintendo DS.

Xseed Games localized the PlayStation Portable games Ys I & II Chronicles, Ys: The Oath in Felghana, and Ys Seven in North America.

In 2012, Xseed Games began publishing Japanese PC games through Steam, starting with the PC version of Ys: The Oath in Felghana on 19 March. On 31 May, Xseed Games released an English version of Ys Origin on Steam. Ys I & II were also released via Steam in February 2013 as Ys I & II Chronicles+ – Xseed managed to combine Falcom's PC port of Ys I & II Chronicles with the earlier PC release Ys I & II Complete, effectively mixing all the best features of both versions like selectable soundtracks (PC-88 original, Complete and Chronicles) and art styles from both Chronicles and Complete, alongside the visual flexibility of Complete, such as greater viewing area, togglable screen frame and support for windowed mode.

Ys: Memories of Celceta was released in North America in November 2013 by Xseed Games. The American release was also released as a limited edition called Silver Anniversary Edition, which features a 3-CD collection of both original and arranged music spanning the history of the franchise, a cloth map of the land of Celceta, a logo-emblazoned compass and Adol's Travel Journal, containing around 120+ pages of adventuring strategies and artwork. Ys: Memories of Celceta was released by NIS America in Europe in February 2014.

=== MMORPG ===
Ys Online: The Call of Solum, developed by the South Korean game maker CJ Internet and taking place more than a hundred years after the main series, was launched on 5 November 2007 in South Korea, and in 2009 as an open beta for Chinese, Japanese and European players, but was discontinued in all regions in October 2012.

Ys Online: The Ark of Napishtim (2021) – A mobile MMORPG adaptation of Ys VI. It was developed by Random Games under the initiative of Restar Games (Fosun Group), which comprised the Japan-facing publishing team of Beijing Rekoo.

== Animation ==
There are two separate OVA series of Ys, with the first spanning seven episodes and covering the events of the first game, and the second running for four episodes and loosely covering the events of the second game. The first anime expands on the relatively thin storyline of Ys I, including a retelling and expansion of the prologue found in the game's original Japanese manual.

Both series were released on DVD in English by Media Blasters' anime label "AnimeWorks", packaged both separately and in a three-disc box set. The dubbed/audio tracks have changes to some character names ("Dark Fact" becoming "Dark Factor", "Adol" becoming "Adle", and "Lilia" becoming "Lillian", for instance). Pronunciations of various names are inconsistent, sometimes within the same scene.

Included on one of the discs is what appears to be a preview for an anime based around Ys IV: Dawn of Ys. This was created by Falcom as a "pitch" trailer to shop around to various animation studios to see if anyone was interested in producing the series, but they had no takers, so this trailer is all that exists of the rumored Ys IV: Dawn of Ys anime.

== Music ==
The first two games were composed by Yuzo Koshiro, Mieko Ishikawa, and Hideya Nagata, whereas Mieko Ishikawa handled the soundtrack for Ys III. The composers' works have been remixed for each subsequent release, for instance, by Japanese musician Ryo Yonemitsu for Hudson Soft's Ys I & II, Ys III: Wanderers from Ys and Ys IV: The Dawn of Ys releases for TurboGrafx-CD. The TurboGrafx versions made use of Red Book audio.

The Ys series is seen in the video game music industry as some of the finest and most influential role-playing video game scores of all time, demonstrated by an extensive series of CD releases based on the series' music, with numerous variations on its themes. It has also inspired video game composers outside Japan, such as German musician Chris Huelsbeck.

The later games in the series were composed by Falcom Sound Team jdk, the collective name of Falcom's internal sound production staff (not to be confused with the jdk Band – a band made of freelance musicians who works for Falcom and performs Sound Team jdk's music live and for arranged albums).
