= Ys III: Wanderers from Ys =

1989 video game

- Developer: Nihon Falcom
- Publisher: Nihon Falcom
- Director: Masaya Hashimoto
- Designer: Tomoyoshi Miyazaki
- Programmer: Masanori Hoshino
- Artist: Mika Ishii
- Writer: Katsutoshi Eguchi
- Composer: Mieko Ishikawa
- Series: Ys
- Platforms: PC-8801, PC-9801, MSX2, X68000, TurboGrafx-CD, Super NES, Famicom, Genesis/Mega Drive, PlayStation 2
- Release: July 21, 1989: PC-8801; JP: July 21, 1989 PC-9801; JP: July 28, 1989 MSX2; JP: October 20, 1989 X68000; JP: March 24, 1990 TurboGrafx-CD; JP: March 22, 1991; NA: November 1991 Super NES; JP: June 21, 1991; NA: January 1992 Famicom; JP: September 27, 1991 Genesis/Mega Drive; JP: November 1, 1991; NA: 1991 PlayStation 2; JP: March 24, 2005
- Genre: Action role-playing
- Mode: Single-player

Ys III: Wanderers from Ys (Note: Japanese: イースIII – ワンダラーズフロムイース, Hepburn: Īsu Surī – Wandarāzu Furomu Īsu) is a 1989 action role-playing game developed by Nihon Falcom. It is the third game in the Ys series.

Ys III was initially released for the PC-8801 and PC-9801 in 1989 under the title Wanderers from Ys, and versions for the MSX2 and X68000 soon followed. In 1991, a number of console ports were produced: versions for the TurboGrafx-CD, Famicom, Super NES, and Sega Genesis; all of them aside from the Famicom version were released internationally. A remaster for the PlayStation 2 was released by Taito in 2005. A remake Ys: The Oath in Felghana, was released the same year for Windows.

The gameplay of Ys III diverged significantly from other games in the series; it utilizes a side-scrolling camera angle and platformer elements similar to that of Zelda II: The Adventure of Link. This is also the final game in the series with the involvement of Masaya Hashimoto and Tomoyoshi Miyazaki before they left to form Quintet.

== Plot ==
Three years after the events of Ys I and II, Adol Christin and his friend, Dogi, return to the latter's hometown of Redmont, where they learn the town is under threat from the forces of Valestein castle; Adol agrees to aid them. Adol rescues the mayor of Redmont, Edgar, from a quarry and retrieves a mysterious statue. In Redmont, Adol's friend, Elena, explains that these statues are being sought after by Lord MacGuire, the King of Felghana province. Adol retrieves the second statue from Illsburn Ruins and finds two townspeople, Father Pierre and Chester - who is Elena's brother - already there. Adol is kicked into a pit by Chester, must fight his way past a fire dragon to escape and finds the second statue. Adol meets with Edgar, who informs him that men from Valestein (Ballacetine in the SNES version) Castle are also seeking the statues.

After retrieving the third statue, Adol returns to Redmont to inform Edgar and finds him in conversation with MacGuire and Bishop Garland. The three reveal that the statues were once used to seal Galbalan, a demon of great power that ruled Felghana long ago, until he was defeated by a hero using the four statues. Adol meets a mountain hermit, also Dogi's martial arts instructor, who tells him the location of the fourth statue further up the mountain, and he defeats its guardian and retrieves it. Chester arrives and tries to force Adol to hand over the statues, but the pair are trapped by a cave-in and saved by Dogi. Adol and Dogi return to Redmont and find it abandoned, save for a handful of citizens, who explain the rest were abducted by soldiers from Valestein Castle to hold them hostage in exchange for the statues. Adol sets out for the castle.

Adol confronts Garland and defeats him, then moves on to confront MacGuire, but he is repentant and agrees to make reparations for his actions. Adol then meets Elena on his way out, but she is abducted by Galbalan, whose seal has weakened, and he tells Adol to bring him the statues on his island fortress. With encouragement from Edgar and Dogi, Adol sets off to rescue Elena. At Galbalan's fortress, he finds Elena and Chester talking to each other, when Galbalan speaks to them. Adol agrees to hand over the statues if he does not harm Chester or Elena, and Galbalan agrees and brings Adol into his realm. Galbalan is freed, but Adol defeats him. Afterward, he learns from Elena that Chester has gone to the center of the island to sink it and seal it away, as their village are descended from the hero that sealed Galbalan and only Chester knows how to do this. Adol and Elena flee the island while Chester sacrifices himself to sink it.

In Redmont, Adol and Dogi prepare to continue their adventures in the morning. That night, Elena admits to Dogi she loves Adol and, in the morning, she runs to wave goodbye to them, crying as they wave back and depart.

== Gameplay ==
Instead of the top-down camera view used in previous Ys games, Ys III uses a side-scrolling platformer presentation reminiscent of Zelda II: The Adventure of Link. Auto-attack is removed; the player must push a button to make Adol attack enemies.

Otherwise, the gameplay mechanics are identical to previous entries in the series. The statistics, equipment, shopping, experience system, and magic all function the same as in Ys I and II (though spells are represented by rings instead of wand icons, and MP is renamed "Ring Power"); further, neither the player character nor the enemies have temporary invincibility.

== Music ==
The soundtrack to the original version of Ys III was entirely composed by Mieko Ishikawa. The X68000 version of the game introduced a number of additional compositions, which were composed by Masaaki Kawai. Kawai was also responsible for the arrangements of Ishikawa's existing compositions for this version.

Falcom has released a number of music CDs dedicated to the music of Ys III. They include:

- Music from Ys III: Wanderers from Ys (1989): Soundtrack to the original PC-8801 edition of Ys III, along with three tracks from the X68000 edition.
- Wanderers from Ys Super Arrange Version (1989): A collection of arranged tracks from Ys III by Hiroyuki Nanba and Atsushi Yokozeki.
- Ys III J.D.K. Special (1990): The complete soundtrack to the X68000 version of Ys III, along with four rock music arrangements from Falcom's J.D.K. Band.
- Perfect Collection Ys III (1990): A two-CD set entirely dedicated to Ys III. The first disc is a complete arrangement of the Ys III soundtrack, including the X68000-introduced tracks, by Ryo Yonemitsu (who also arranged the TurboGrafx-CD version's CD-DA tracks), Yoshio Tsuru and Kanji Saito. The second disc contains additional Ys III arrangements in various musical styles.

To commemorate the release of the Ys III remake The Oath in Felghana in 2005, Falcom released Ys Premium Music CD Box in Felghana, a boxed set with most of all Ys III music produced.

== Release ==
The X68000 version was re-released in 2022 in Japan by BEEP with the physical floppy disks. On April 23, 2026, BEEP will launch a compilation, Ys Legacy Collection ~Ys I&II&III For X68000 Z~, that contains this version of Ys III and BEEP's 2021 port of Ys I & II for the X68000. The bundle includes the games on an SD card.

The PC-8801 version was globally re-released in 2024 on the Nintendo Switch by D4 Enterprise via the Eggconsole emulation software. D4 Enterprise plans to re-release the PC-8801, PC-9801, X68000, and MSX2 versions as part of a collection for the Microsoft Windows in 2026.

== Ys: The Oath in Felghana ==
In 2005, Falcom released Ys: The Oath in Felghana for Microsoft Windows, a remake of Ys III. The Oath in Felghana slightly modifies and greatly expands on the story of the original Ys III, and expands the dungeons to extend the gameplay time. The original side-scroller was also replaced with a 3D game engine, based on that used in Ys VI: The Ark of Napishtim.

In 2010, Falcom released a version of Ys: The Oath in Felghana for the PlayStation Portable, which Xseed Games officially released in English later the same year. This was followed in 2012 by a newly localized version of the original 2005 PC release.

== Reception ==
Reception

Aggregate score
Aggregator	Score
GameRankings	Genesis: 60% SNES: 64% TurboGrafx-CD: 80%

Review scores
Publication	Score
Electronic Gaming Monthly	TG16: 30/40
Famitsu	PCE: 7/10, 8/10, 8/10, 6/10
GamePro	SNES: 20/25
Nintendo Power	SNES: 15.2/20
PC Engine Fan	PCE: 24.63/30
RPGFan	SNES: 81%
Video Games (DE)	SMD: 68% SNES: 66%
VideoGames & Computer Entertainment	SMD: 7/10; TG16: 8/10
Entertainment Weekly	SNES: C+

=== SNES ===
Entertainment Weekly criticized the inability to control the storyline and described the combat as tedious and repetitive.
