= Ys IV: The Dawn of Ys =

1993 video game

- Developer: Hudson Soft
- Publisher: Hudson Soft
- Director: Tomonori Matsunaga
- Designer: Taiichi Matsuda
- Composers: Atsushi Shirakawa; Naoki Kaneda; Takahiro Tsunashima; Masaru Nakajima
- Series: Ys
- Platform: PC Engine CD-ROM²
- Release: JP: December 22, 1993
- Genre: Action role-playing
- Mode: Single-player

Ys IV: The Dawn of Ys (Note: Japanese: イースIV -ザ ドーン オブ イース-, Hepburn: Īsu Fō -Za Dōn obu Īsu-) is an action role-playing game by Hudson Soft for the PC Engine CD-ROM². It is the fourth game in the Ys video game series. The Dawn of Ys was one of two games released under the title of Ys IV, the other being Tonkin House's Ys IV: Mask of the Sun for the Super Famicom. The two games share the same setting, but Hudson took more liberties with its presentation in The Dawn of Ys, and two unique games resulted.

== Plot ==
Ys IV takes place two years after the events of Ys II, and before the events of Ys III: Wanderers from Ys. As the game begins, Adol has returned to the town of Minea, where Ys I began. After hanging around for a while and conversing with old friends, he decides to set sail for the overseas land of Celceta.

== Gameplay ==
Ys IV returns to the style of play used in Ys I and II. The gameplay area is viewed from a top-down perspective, and the player attacks enemies by running into them to cause damage. Adol gains experience from defeating enemies, and gaining experience serves to raise his strength, as in the previous games. The Magic system introduced in Ys II is also brought back for this game.

== Development ==
Ys series creators Nihon Falcom licensed its development to Hudson Soft.

The original music was composed by Falcom Sound Team J.D.K. members Atsushi Shirakawa, Naoki Kaneda, Takahiro Tsunashima, and Masaru Nakajima. As was the case with Hudson's CD-ROM² versions of Ys I & II and Ys III: Wanderers from Ys, The Dawn of Ys CD-DA tracks were arranged by Ryo Yonemitsu. Yonemitsu did not arrange the entire soundtrack for the game itself, as many tracks were programmed for the console's internal sound chip by Osamu Narita, but he did cover every track for the Perfect Collection Ys IV CD series.

== Release ==
Ys IV: The Dawn of Ys was released on December 22, 1993 for the PC Engine CD-ROM² in Japan. An English fan translation was created by NightWolve and released in 2004.

In 2025, Edia announced it would release ports of Nihon Falcom's TurboGrafx-CD titles, including Ys IV: The Dawn of Ys. It will be released between fiscal years 2026 and 2027.

== Reception ==
Reception

Review score
Publication	Score
Famitsu	8/10, 6/10, 8/10, 7/10

French magazine Joypad gave it 96%.
