= Ys Seven =

2009 video game

- Developer: Nihon Falcom (Note: PC version ported by Hyde, Inc.)
- Publisher: Xseed Games: JP: Nihon Falcom
- Director: Toshihiro Kondo
- Producer: Masayuki Kato
- Programmer: Hideyuki Yamashita
- Artist: Katsumi Enami
- Writers: Hisayoshi Takeiri; Syunsei Shikata; Yuuta Miyazaki
- Composers: Hayato Sonoda; Takahiro Unisuga; Saki Momiyama; Masanori Osaki
- Series: Ys
- Platforms: PlayStation Portable, Windows
- Release: PlayStation Portable: JP: September 17, 2009; NA: August 17, 2010; EU: November 3, 2010; AU: February 20, 2013; Windows: CHN: July 26, 2012; WW: August 30, 2017
- Genre: Action role-playing
- Mode: Single-player

Ys Seven (Note: Japanese: イース7) (stylized as Ys SEVEN) is a 2009 action role-playing game developed by Nihon Falcom. An installment in the Ys series, it was first released in Japan for the PlayStation Portable in September 2009. Xseed Games released the game in 2010 in North America in August, and Europe in November. The game was later released in Australia in February 2013. It was also released for Windows in China in June 2012, and worldwide by Xseed Games in August 2017.

== Plot ==
Adol and Dogi reach the kingdom of Altago in an attempt to find more adventure. While exploring the town, they get into trouble trying to save two sisters who were being harassed by the local Dragon Knights, which is the army force of Altago. They are thrown into the cells, but thanks to their reputation as adventurers, they get a request from the king to help him investigate some strange earthquakes going on lately, as his men have not been able to find anything. On their way, they find out the Five Dragons are awakening once again to prevent a great catastrophe, lending their power to Adol to help stop it.

== Gameplay ==
In previous Ys games, players had to switch between elemental weapons or magic types to damage monsters and bosses. In this game, weapon types are used to determine whether damage is enhanced or minimized. Slashing weapons deal enhanced damage to soft enemies. Striking weapons deal enhanced damage to hard and armored enemies. Piercing weapons deal enhanced damage to flying enemies, lightweight enemies, and/or agile enemies. If an enemy other than a boss has a weakness against a weapon type, it will take an insignificant amount of damage or no damage at all from attacks that do not match that weakness. There are also enemies that are not weak or strong against any weapon types, so all weapons will deal normal amounts of damage from any weapon type.

A party can have up to three characters in it with the player controlling one of them. The two other members are controlled by the AI while in combat and it is possible to set how they attack. All playable characters except for Adol must use weapons that fit a damage type assigned to that character, while Adol can use swords which are usually assigned any one of the three weapon types. For example, Dogi can only use punching weapons which all deal striking damage.

Hitting enemies with charged attacks fills a skill point meter that allows characters to perform skills. Skills are taught by using different weapons, and are permanently learned by using those skills enough, allowing the skill to be used with any weapon the character uses. Further use of a skill allows the user to enhance the skill. There is also an extra meter that when filled, allows the character the player controls to perform a super attack. Landing finishing blows with skills is the normal way to fill the extra meter.

Players can also parry attacks in order to reduce damage. A parry is known as a "flash guard". If the player attempts to parry at the same time or shortly before a hit in an attack connects, that hit in the attack is nullified, the SP and extra meters are significantly filled, and successful ripostes are guaranteed to be critical attacks. Attempting to parry with the wrong timing will result in the player taking a critical hit.

== Reception ==
Reception

Aggregate score
Aggregator	Score
Metacritic	PSP: 79/100; PC: 80/100

Review scores
Publication	Score
Destructoid	8/10
GameSpot	7.5/10
IGN	8/10

The game received generally positive reception. Ryan Clements from IGN has praised the game's skill and battle system, calling it "unlike any JRPG I've played in recent memory. Even more surprising are the game's boss encounters, which require extreme focus to beat". He also noted that the music is "very enjoyable" and that, while the story is simple, the sincerity "keeps it from being boring". Still, he criticized the need to backtrack to the dungeons and the "modest" graphics. RPGamer awarded Ys Seven "Best PSP RPG of 2010".

RPGFan named it "Overall Best RPG of E3".
