= Ys II =

1988 video game

- Developer: Nihon Falcom
- Publisher: Nihon Falcom
- Director: Masaya Hashimoto
- Producer: Masayuki Kato
- Designer: Masaya Hashimoto
- Writers: Takahiro Ōura; Tomō Yamane; Tomoyoshi Miyazaki
- Composers: Yuzo Koshiro; Mieko Ishikawa; Hideya Nagata
- Series: Ys
- Platforms: PC-8801, PC-9801, FM-7, X1, MSX2, Famicom, MS-DOS, Sega Saturn, Windows
- Release: April 22, 1988: PC-8801; JP: April 22, 1988 PC-9801, X1; JP: June 24, 1988 FM-7; JP: July 8, 1988 MSX2; JP: July 15, 1988 Famicom; JP: May 25, 1990 MS-DOS; KO: 1994 Saturn; JP: October 29, 1998 Windows; JP: July 6, 2000 i-mode; JP: June 2003
- Genre: Action role-playing
- Mode: Single-player

Ys II, titled on-screen as Ancient Ys Vanished: The Final Chapter, is a 1988 action role-playing game developed by Nihon Falcom. It is a sequel to Ys I: Ancient Ys Vanished and takes place immediately following it. The game was first released for the PC-8801 and PC-9801 and has seen several ports and remakes since.

Picking up almost immediately after the events of the first game, the story opens with Adol being transported to the titular civilization, which is now a floating island in the heavens. There, Adol learns the truth behind the first game's events, being part of a larger conspiracy orchestrated by a greater evil, as well as the kingdom of Ys itself.

Ys II was later adapted into an OVA series Ys II: Castle in the Heavens. DotEmu has released the game on Android with the following localizations: English, French, German, Italian, Korean, Japanese and Chinese.

== Versions ==
Like its predecessor, Ys II was ported to various other platforms following its first release, such as the FM-7, X1, MSX2, and Famicom.

It was released along with its predecessor as part of the enhanced compilation, Ys I & II, for the TurboGrafx-CD by Hudson Soft in 1989. For many years this was the only version of Ys II that received an official English release.

An MS-DOS remake called Ys II Special, developed by Mantra, was released exclusively for the South Korean market in 1994. It was a mash-up of Ys II with the OVA Ys II: Castle in the Heavens along with a large amount of new content, including more secrets than any other version of the game. The game was a success in Korea, despite competition from the Korean RPG Astonishia Story that same year.

A Sega Saturn version for Japan only was released in 1998 in a compilation called Falcom Classics II.

A third remake was released for Microsoft Windows-based PCs as Ys II Eternal, and later as Ys II Complete. Versions of the game have also been developed for mobile phone platforms.

Ys II was also remade in 2008 for the Nintendo DS. An English translation of this version was released by Atlus in North America, along with the DS version of Ys I on a single card, as Legacy of Ys: Books I & II in 2009. The Japanese version had been released as a single game when it came out in 2008.

== Plot ==
Ys II picks up immediately where Ys I left off. Adol Christin is transported to the floating island of Ys, where he meets a young woman named Lilia. She takes Adol to her home, Lance Village. It is here that he will begin his quest to unravel the secrets of Ys, and finally, rid it and Esteria of evil.

== Gameplay ==
The player controls Adol as he battles his way across the land of Ys. As in the first game, Adol's strength is measured in a typical RPG fashion: he has numerical statistics such as HP, attack power, and defense power that determine his strength. These stats are increased by raising his experience level through battling.

Also returning from the first game is the 'bump' combat system. The player attacks enemies by running into them, and the enemy takes damage according to Adol's stats, the enemy's stats, Adol's position, and the enemy's position. A new addition to Ys II is the magic system: Adol can acquire several different spells he can use throughout the course of play, such as a fire spell for attack and a time spell which can stop enemies as long as it is active. The use of magic consumes Adol's MP stat. Another major change in combat in this game compared to the previous game is that the bump combat system cannot be used against most bosses. Crashing into all but two of the bosses in this game in an attempt to damage them will only result in Adol taking damage. These bosses must be defeated with the fire spell.

== Music ==
The soundtrack to Ys II was composed by Yuzo Koshiro, Mieko Ishikawa, and Hideya Nagata.

Several music CDs dedicated to the music of Ys II have been released by Falcom. They include:

- Music from Ys II (1988): Contains the soundtrack to the original PC-8801 edition of Ys II, along with four Ys II tracks arranged by Hiroyuki Namba and one vocal track.
- Perfect Collection Ys II (1990): A two-CD set, the first of which is a complete arrangement of the Ys II soundtrack by Ryo Yonemitsu. The second disc contains assorted arrangements from Ys I, II and III.
- Music from Ys II Renewal (1995): The entire Ys II soundtrack, reproduced on more advanced synthesizer equipment.

== Reception ==
Reception

Review score
Publication	Score
Famitsu	27/40 (NES); 35/40 (TGCD)

Japanese game magazine Famitsu gave the Famicom (NES) version a score of 27 out of 40. Famitsu gave the PCE-CD (TurboGrafx-CD) version a score of 35 out of 40.
