= List of Trails media =

Franchise of video games and media

Trails, known as Kiseki (軌跡) in Japan, is a science fantasy series of role-playing video games by Nihon Falcom. Trails is a part of their larger The Legend of Heroes franchise and began with the release of Trails in the Sky in 2004. The games were released exclusively in Asia until the 2010s, with Xseed Games handling its English localization and global publishing until being replaced by NIS America in 2019. Trails games primarily feature turn-based combat, with some spin-offs and later entries featuring other styles of gameplay. The series is commonly praised for its character arcs and worldbuilding. It has also seen adapted and original manga, audio drama, and anime works, with the games selling 9 million copies by 2025.

== Video games ==
=== Main series ===
Game	Details
Trails in the Sky Original release date(s): JP: June 24, 2004; NA: March 29, 2011; EU: November 4, 2011	Release years by system: 2004 – Windows; 2006 – PlayStation Portable; 2008 – FOMA; 2012 – PlayStation 3; 2015 – PlayStation Vita; 2016 – iOS, Android
Trails in the Sky Original release date(s): JP: June 24, 2004; NA: March 29, 2011; EU: November 4, 2011	Notes: First game of the Liberl arc; Known as Eiyū Densetsu VI: Sora no Kiseki in Japan; Published outside Japan by Xseed Games
Trails in the Sky SC Original release date(s): JP: March 9, 2006; WW: October 29, 2015	Release years by system: 2006 – Windows; 2007 – PlayStation Portable; 2013 – PlayStation 3; 2015 – PlayStation Vita; 2016 – iOS, Android
Trails in the Sky SC Original release date(s): JP: March 9, 2006; WW: October 29, 2015	Notes: Second game of the Liberl arc; Known as Eiyū Densetsu VI: Sora no Kiseki SC in Japan; SC standing for "Second Chapter"; Published outside Japan by Xseed Games
Trails in the Sky the 3rd Original release date(s): JP: June 28, 2007; WW: May 3, 2017	Release years by system: 2007 – Windows; 2008 – PlayStation Portable; 2013 – PlayStation 3; 2016 – iOS, Android, PlayStation Vita
Trails in the Sky the 3rd Original release date(s): JP: June 28, 2007; WW: May 3, 2017	Notes: Third and final game of the Liberl arc; Known as Eiyū Densetsu: Sora no Kiseki the 3rd in Japan; Published outside Japan by Xseed Games
Trails from Zero Original release date(s): JP: September 30, 2010; NA: September 27, 2022; EU: September 30, 2022	Release years by system: 2010 – PlayStation Portable; 2011 – Windows; 2012 – PlayStation Vita; 2020 – PlayStation 4; 2021 – Nintendo Switch; 2026 – Nintendo Switch 2, PlayStation 5
Trails from Zero Original release date(s): JP: September 30, 2010; NA: September 27, 2022; EU: September 30, 2022	Notes: First game of the Crossbell arc; Known as The Legend of Heroes: Zero no Kiseki in Japan; Published outside Japan by NIS America; based on a fan translation
Trails to Azure Original release date(s): JP: September 29, 2011; NA: March 14, 2023; EU: March 17, 2023	Release years by system: 2011 – PlayStation Portable; 2013 – Windows; 2014 – PlayStation Vita; 2020 – PlayStation 4; 2021 – Nintendo Switch; 2026 – Nintendo Switch 2, PlayStation 5
Trails to Azure Original release date(s): JP: September 29, 2011; NA: March 14, 2023; EU: March 17, 2023	Notes: Second and final game of the Crossbell arc; Known as The Legend of Heroes: Ao no Kiseki in Japan; Published outside Japan by NIS America; based on a fan translation
Trails of Cold Steel Original release date(s): JP: September 26, 2013; NA: December 22, 2015; EU: January 29, 2016	Release years by system: 2013 – PlayStation 3, PlayStation Vita; 2017 – Windows; 2018 – PlayStation 4; 2021 – Nintendo Switch
Trails of Cold Steel Original release date(s): JP: September 26, 2013; NA: December 22, 2015; EU: January 29, 2016	Notes: First game of the Erebonia arc and first to be rendered in 3D; Known as The Legend of Heroes: Sen no Kiseki in Japan; Published outside Japan by Xseed Games
Trails of Cold Steel II Original release date(s): JP: September 25, 2014; NA: September 6, 2016; EU: November 11, 2016	Release years by system: 2014 – PlayStation 3, PlayStation Vita; 2018 – Windows, PlayStation 4; 2021 – Nintendo Switch
Trails of Cold Steel II Original release date(s): JP: September 25, 2014; NA: September 6, 2016; EU: November 11, 2016	Notes: Second game of the Erebonia arc; Known as The Legend of Heroes: Sen no Kiseki II in Japan; Published outside Japan by Xseed Games
Trails of Cold Steel III Original release date(s): JP: September 28, 2017; WW: October 22, 2019	Release years by system: 2017 – PlayStation 4; 2020 – Nintendo Switch, Windows; 2022 – Stadia; 2024 – PlayStation 5
Trails of Cold Steel III Original release date(s): JP: September 28, 2017; WW: October 22, 2019	Notes: Third game of the Erebonia arc; Known as The Legend of Heroes: Sen no Kiseki III in Japan; Published outside Japan by NIS America
Trails of Cold Steel IV Original release date(s): JP: September 27, 2018; WW: October 27, 2020	Release years by system: 2018 – PlayStation 4; 2021 – Nintendo Switch, Windows, Stadia; 2024 – PlayStation 5
Trails of Cold Steel IV Original release date(s): JP: September 27, 2018; WW: October 27, 2020	Notes: Fourth game of the Erebonia arc; Known as The Legend of Heroes: Sen no Kiseki IV – The End of Saga in Japan; Published outside Japan by NIS America
Trails into Reverie Original release date(s): JP: August 27, 2020; WW: July 7, 2023	Release years by system: 2020 – PlayStation 4; 2021 – Nintendo Switch, Windows; 2022 – PlayStation 5
Trails into Reverie Original release date(s): JP: August 27, 2020; WW: July 7, 2023	Notes: Concludes the Crossbell and Erebonia arcs; Known as The Legend of Heroes: Hajimari no Kiseki in Japan; Published outside Japan by NIS America
Trails Through Daybreak Original release date(s): JP: September 30, 2021; WW: July 5, 2024	Release years by system: 2021 – PlayStation 4; 2022 – PlayStation 5, Windows; 2024 – Nintendo Switch
Trails Through Daybreak Original release date(s): JP: September 30, 2021; WW: July 5, 2024	Notes: First game of the Calvard arc; Known as The Legend of Heroes: Kuro no Kiseki in Japan; Published outside Japan by NIS America
Trails Through Daybreak II Original release date(s): JP: September 29, 2022; WW: February 14, 2025	Release years by system: 2022 – PlayStation 4, PlayStation 5; 2023 – Windows; 2024 – Nintendo Switch
Trails Through Daybreak II Original release date(s): JP: September 29, 2022; WW: February 14, 2025	Notes: Second game of the Calvard arc; Known as The Legend of Heroes: Kuro no Kiseki II -Crimson Sin- in Japan; Published outside Japan by NIS America
Trails Beyond the Horizon Original release date(s): JP: September 26, 2024; WW: January 15, 2026	Release years by system: 2024 – PlayStation 4, PlayStation 5; 2025 – Windows; 2026 – Nintendo Switch, Nintendo Switch 2
Trails Beyond the Horizon Original release date(s): JP: September 26, 2024; WW: January 15, 2026	Notes: Third game of the Calvard arc; Known as The Legend of Heroes: Kai no Kiseki -Farewell, O Zemuria- in Japan; Published outside Japan by NIS America

=== Remakes ===
Game	Details
Trails in the Sky 1st Chapter Original release date(s): WW: September 19, 2025	Release years by system: 2025 – Nintendo Switch, Nintendo Switch 2, PlayStation 5, Windows
Trails in the Sky 1st Chapter Original release date(s): WW: September 19, 2025	Notes: 3D remake of Trails in the Sky using the Daybreak engine; First game in the series to release worldwide simultaneously; Published in North America by GungHo and in Europe by Clear River Games
Trails in the Sky 2nd Chapter Original release date(s): WW: September 17, 2026	Release years by system: 2026 – Nintendo Switch, Nintendo Switch 2, PlayStation 5, Windows
Trails in the Sky 2nd Chapter Original release date(s): WW: September 17, 2026	Notes: 3D remake of Trails in the Sky SC; To be published in North America by GungHo and in Europe by Clear River Games

=== Spin-offs ===
Game	Details
Ys vs. Trails in the Sky Original release date(s): JP: July 29, 2010; WW: October 10, 2025	Release years by system: 2010 – PlayStation Portable; 2025 – Nintendo Switch, PlayStation 4, PlayStation 5, Windows
Ys vs. Trails in the Sky Original release date(s): JP: July 29, 2010; WW: October 10, 2025	Notes: Subtitled Alternative Saga; known as Ys vs. Sora no Kiseki in Japan; Crossover fighting game featuring characters from Trails and Falcom's Ys series; English release based on a 2021 fan translation
The Legend of Nayuta: Boundless Trails Original release date(s): JP: July 26, 2012; NA: September 19, 2023; EU/AU: September 22, 2023	Release years by system: 2012 – PlayStation Portable; 2021 – PlayStation 4, Windows; 2022 – Nintendo Switch
The Legend of Nayuta: Boundless Trails Original release date(s): JP: July 26, 2012; NA: September 19, 2023; EU/AU: September 22, 2023	Notes: Known as Nayuta no Kiseki in Japan; Action role-playing game set outside Zemuria with implied narrative connections
Yume no Kiseki Original release date(s): JP: July 6, 2013	Release years by system: 2013 – Android, iOS
Yume no Kiseki Original release date(s): JP: July 6, 2013	Notes: Developed by Vanguard; Discontinued in May 2014; Unofficially translated as Trails of Dreams
Trails at Sunrise Original release date(s): JP: August 31, 2016	Release years by system: 2016 – Browser game, PlayStation Vita; 2017 – PlayStation 4; 2018 – Android, iOS; 2019 – Nintendo Switch
Trails at Sunrise Original release date(s): JP: August 31, 2016	Notes: Known as Akatsuki no Kiseki in Japan; Gacha game developed by UserJoy Technology; Originally released as a Unity Web Player game; console ports were discontinued in 2022
Trails in the Sky: Kizuna Original release date(s): SG/MY: March 5, 2018; TW: April 12, 2018	Release years by system: 2018 – Android, iOS
Trails in the Sky: Kizuna Original release date(s): SG/MY: March 5, 2018; TW: April 12, 2018	Notes: Developed by Changyou for Asia regions; Card battle game
Trails in the Sky OL Original release date(s): CHN: September 17, 2019	Release years by system: 2019 – Android, iOS
Trails in the Sky OL Original release date(s): CHN: September 17, 2019	Notes: Developed by Changyou and released exclusively in China; Based on Trails in the Sky
Trails in the Sky: Chapter of Shadows Original release date(s): CHN: October 28, 2022	Release years by system: 2022 – Android
Trails in the Sky: Chapter of Shadows Original release date(s): CHN: October 28, 2022	Notes: Developed by Changyou and released exclusively in China
Trails of Cold Steel: Northern War Original release date(s): JP: December 6, 2023; WW: May 29, 2024	Release years by system: 2023 – Android, iOS
Trails of Cold Steel: Northern War Original release date(s): JP: December 6, 2023; WW: May 29, 2024	Notes: Developed by UserJoy and based on the anime of the same name

== Audio ==
Game	Details
Trails in the Sky Super Arrange Version June 24, 2004 – soundtrack	Notes: Arranged by Yukihiro Jondo
Trails in the Sky Original Soundtrack July 30, 2004 – soundtrack	Notes: Composed by Hayato Sonoda and Wataru Ishibashi
Trails in the Sky SC Original Soundtrack July 30, 2004 – soundtrack	Notes: Composed by Hayato Sonoda, Wataru Ishibashi, Ryo Takeshita, and Takahiro Unisuga
Trails in the Sky Vocal Version August 25, 2006 – soundtrack	Notes: Arranged by Yukihiro Jindo and Kohei Wada
Trails in the Sky FC & SC Super Arrange Version September 15, 2006 – soundtrack	Notes: Arranged by Yukihiro Jindo
Trails in the Sky the 3rd Original Soundtrack September 27, 2007 – soundtrack	Notes: Composed by Ryo Takeshita, Hayato Sonoda, and Takahiro Unisuga
Trails in the Sky Drama CD: Advanced Chapter March 27, 2010 – audio drama	Notes: Set between Trails in the Sky the 3rd and Trails from Zero
Trails from Zero Original Soundtrack December 16, 2010 – soundtrack	Notes: Composed by Hayato Sonoda, Saki Momiyama, Masanori Osaki, and Takahiro Unisuga
Trails from Zero Drama CD: Road to the Future September 29, 2011 – audio drama	Notes: Set between Trails from Zero and Trails to Azure
Trails to Azure Original Soundtrack December 10, 2011 – soundtrack	Notes: Composed by Hayato Sonoda, Saki Momiyama, Masanori Osaki, and Takahiro Unisuga
Hoshi no Arika Zanmai December 30, 2011 – soundtrack	Notes: Compilation of "The Whereabouts of Light" ("Hoshi no Arika") arrangements from Trails in the Sky
Falcom Boss Zanmai August 10, 2012 – soundtrack	Notes: Compilation of boss themes from Falcom games, includes two tracks from the Crossbell duology; Arranged by Yukihiro Jindo, Toshiharu Okajima, and Noriyuki Kamikura
Boundless Trails Original Soundtrack September 27, 2012 – soundtrack	Notes: Composed by Hayato Sonoda, Takahiro Unisuga, Saki Momiyama, Ryo Takeshita, Masanori Osaki
Trails in the Sky Zanmai July 9, 2013 – soundtrack	Notes: Music from the Trails in the Sky trilogy, arranged by Yukihiro Jindo and others
Falcom Field Zanmai August 10, 2013 – soundtrack	Notes: Compilation of overworld themes from Falcom games, includes three Trails tracks; Arranged by Yukihiro Jindo, Toshiharu Okajima, Noriyuki Kamikura, and Satoshi Ohyama
Trails from Cold Steel Drama CD: Returning Home September 26, 2013 – audio drama	Notes: Set during Trails of Cold Steel; Script translated by Xseed Games as promotional material for the English version of Trails of Cold Steel II
Trails of Cold Steel Original Soundtrack December 13, 2013 – soundtrack	Notes: Composed by Hayato Sonoda, Saki Momiyama, Masanori Osaki, Takahiro Unisuga, and Tomokatsu Hagiuda
Trails to Azure Evolution Original Soundtrack August 20, 2014 – soundtrack	Notes: Soundtrack to the PlayStation Portable port; Arranged by Yukihiro Jindo and Toshiharu Okajima
Trails of Cold Steel II Drama CD: The Remote Town of Alster September 25, 2014 – audio drama	Notes: Set during Trails of Cold Steel II; Script translated by Xseed Games as promotional material for the English release of Trails of Cold Steel II
Trails of Cold Steel II Original Soundtrack November 26, 2014 – soundtrack	Notes: Composed by Hayato Sonoda, Saki Momiyama, and Takahiro Unisuga
Trails in the Sky Evolution Original Soundtrack June 11, 2015 – soundtrack	Notes: Soundtrack to the PlayStation Portable port; Arranged by Yukihiro Jindo and Toshiharu Okajima
Trails in the Sky SC Evolution Original Soundtrack January 15, 2016 – soundtrack	Notes: Soundtrack to the PlayStation Portable port; Arranged by Yukihiro Jindo and several others
Trails in the Sky the 3rd Evolution Original Soundtrack August 24, 2016 – soundtrack	Notes: Soundtrack to the PlayStation Portable port; Arranged by Yukihiro Jindo, Mitsuo Singa, Shunsuke Minami, and Toshiharu Okajima
Trails of Cold Steel III Original Soundtrack November 16, 2017 – soundtrack	Notes: Composed by Hayato Sonoda, Takahiro Unisuga, Yukihiro Jindo, and Mitsuo Singa
Trails of Cold Steel IV Original Soundtrack December 13, 2018 – soundtrack	Notes: Composed by Hayato Sonoda, Takahiro Unisuga, Yukihiro Jindo, and Mitsuo Singa
Trails into Reverie Original Soundtrack December 16, 2020 – soundtrack	Notes: Composed by Hayato Sonoda, Takahiro Unisuga, Shuntaro Koguchi, and Mitsuo Singa
Trails through Daybreak Original Soundtrack March 9, 2022 – soundtrack	Notes: Composed by Hayato Sonoda, Shuntaro Koguchi, Yukihiro Jindo, and Mitsuo Singa
Trails through Daybreak II Original Soundtrack February 20, 2023 – soundtrack	Notes: Composed by Hayato Sonoda, Shuntaro Koguchi, Yukihiro Jindo, and Mitsuo Singa
Trails Beyond the Horizon Original Soundtrack January 22, 2025 – soundtrack	Notes: Composed by Hayato Sonoda, Shuntaro Koguchi, Yukihiro Jindo, and Mitsuo Singa

== Literature ==
Game	Details
The Legend of Heroes: Trails in the Sky December 12, 2010 – manga	Notes: Adaptation of Trails in the Sky; Six volumes; the second and third released in 2011, the fourth in 2012, and the fifth and sixth in 2013; Illustrated by Shinki Kitsutsuki and published by Bandai Namco Filmworks
The Ring of Judgment December 18, 2010 – manga	Notes: Full title: The Legend of Heroes: Trails from Zero Pre-Story: The Ring of Judgment (Note: 英雄伝説 零の軌跡プレストーリー -審判の指環-); Set between Trails in the Sky the 3rd and Trails from Zero, the manga follows Estelle and Joshua in an Erebonian town; Written by Falcom, illustrated by Shinki Kitsutsuki, and published by Dengeki Comics
Trails from Zero: The Four Destinies January 18, 2012 – manga	Notes: Full title: The Legend of Heroes: Trails from Zero – The Four Destinies (Note: 英雄伝説 零の軌跡～四つの運命～); Details the lives of the four Special Support Section members prior to them joining; Written by Daisuke Tazawa, illustrated by Tarahi Rakuji, and published by Falcom
Trails in the Sky Gaiden: The Tale of Loewe March 1, 2012 – manga	Notes: Three volumes; the second released later in 2012 and the third released in 2013; Follows Leonhardt during the events of the first two Trails in the Sky games; Written by Falcom and Daisuke Tazawa, illustrated by Tarahi Rakuji, and published by Falcom
The Legend of Heroes: The Characters April 12, 2012 – art book	Notes: Features illustrations and concept art of various characters in the series; Published in Japan by SB Creative and in English worldwide by Udon Entertainment in 2014
The Legend of Heroes: The Illustrations April 12, 2012 – art book	Notes: Features pin-ups, story artwork, and advertising material; Published in Japan by SB Creative and in English worldwide by Udon Entertainment in 2014
Minna Atsumare! Falcom Gakuen July 25, 2012 – manga	Notes: Four-part comedy yonkoma manga; the second released in September 2013, the third in October 2014, and the fourth in October 2015; Written and illustrated by Daisuke Arakubo and serialized in Monthly Falcom Magazine; Adapted into two anime miniseries broadcast on Tokyo MX and Sun TV; part one aired in 2014 and part two in 2015; Unofficially translated as Everyone Assemble! Falcom Academy
The Legend of Heroes: Trails in the Sky SC December 15, 2014 – manga	Notes: Adaptation of Trails in the Sky SC; Three volumes; the second released in 2015 and the third in 2016; Illustrated by Shinki Kitsutsuki and published by Kadokawa
Sept Archive December 25, 2014 – book	Notes: Full title: Trails Series 10th Anniversary Memorial Book Sept Archive (Note: 軌跡シリーズ10周年記念本 セプト=アーカイブ); Book commemorating the 10th anniversary of the franchise featuring plot recaps, a guide to the series' non-game media, additional information on Zemuria and its organizations, an exclusive manga, fan poll results, and an interview with Falcom president Toshihiro Kondo
The Legend of Heroes: Trails of Cold Steel August 18, 2015 – manga	Notes: Adaptation of Trails of Cold Steel; Six volumes; the second, third, and fourth released in 2015, the fifth in 2016, and the sixth in 2018; Written by Mao Emura, illustrated by Riri Sagara, and published by Field Y

== Other ==
Game	Details
Trails in the Sky Material Collection Portable December 20, 2007 – fan disc	Notes: Includes game demos for Trails in the Sky and Falcom's Gurumin, a 147-track soundtrack, wallpapers, and the animated cutscenes from the first two Sky games
The Legend of Heroes: Trails in the Sky November 25, 2011 – original video animation	Notes: Adaptation of Trails in the Sky SC; Two-part OVA; second episode released on February 24, 2012; Produced by Kinema Citrus with a script by Makoto Uezu; Released outside of Japan by Sentai Filmworks in 2012
Trails of Cold Steel the Musical January 8, 2017 – 2.5D musical	Notes: Musical stage play based on the first Trails of Cold Steel game; Performed at the former Zepp Blue Theater Roppongi music hall on January 8–15, 2017; Made use of visual effects by way of 3D glasses given to guests
The Legend of Heroes: Trails of Cold Steel – Northern War January 6, 2023 – anime	Notes: Set in North Ambria between the events of Cold Steel II and III; follows an original cast of characters; 12 episodes produced by Tatsunoko Production and dubbed in English by Crunchyroll
Trails Trading Card Game November 29, 2024 – trading card game	Notes: Designed by TCG Corporation; Made for the 20th anniversary of the series; English version released in September 2025
The Legend of Heroes: Trails of Destiny June 1, 2026 – tabletop game	Notes: Designed by Promethium Books
