= Vantage Master =

1997 video game

- Developer: Nihon Falcom
- Publisher: Nihon Falcom
- Platforms: Windows, PlayStation Portable
- Release: JP: December 12, 1997
- Genre: Tactical RPG
- Modes: Single-player, multiplayer

Vantage Master is a 1997 tactical role-playing game by Nihon Falcom. The game was never released outside of Asia. A sequel, Vantage Master V2, was released in 1998, featuring new maps and adjusted character balance but an unchanged overall game design. The English version of V2 was made available as a free download as of 2002 under the title Vantage Master Online. Another sequel, VM Japan, was released in 2002.

== Gameplay ==
The player takes on the role of a summoner (known as Natial master or just master). A master can summon spirits known as Natials. All masters and Natials have maximum HP of 10. The object of the game is to reduce the opposing master's HP to 0. The game is played on a hex grid map with different types of terrains which affect the gameplay.

In scenario mode, the player must play through 30 stages, divided into 6 phases each containing 4 to 7 stages, against opposing masters. In expert mode, both the player and the enemy are equipped with all Natials and magics available in the game, but the map design is generally disadvantageous for the player. Expert Mode consists of 8 stages. Free Battle allows the player to configure all settings including masters, stats, Natials, magics and the map. Human vs Human, Human vs CPU and CPU vs CPU are also available. Secret characters are available in this mode. There are a total of 27 masters in Vantage Master, of which 18 can be accessed normally.

There are 24 Natials that can be summoned, each of which belongs to one of four attributes: Earth, Water, Fire and Heavens. Each attribute has dominance and a weakness over one another in the following way: Earth beats Water, Water beats Fire, Fire beats Heavens, Heavens beats Earth. A Natial can also be day type or night type, becoming stronger in bright or dark places, respectively. Summoning and maintaining a Natial requires usage of MP. Each attribute has its own "style". For example, Earth units tend to have poor magic resistance with decent attack. They can move very well on land, while some are able to enter a watery terrain, albeit with penalized movement distance.

== Development ==
Falcom announced the development of Vantage Master Portable for the PlayStation Portable (PSP) in 2007, which was released in April 2008. It features new characters from the Trails series of games and a multiplayer mode using the PSP's wireless capabilities. The interface is changed slightly for the PSP, and there is no mouse functionality in the PC port. Otherwise, the game is essentially a complete 3D clone of the original Vantage Master with remastered music and gameplay.

== Legacy ==
A sequel, VM Japan, subtitled Vantage Master – Mystic Far East, was released in 2002 for the PC and later for the PlayStation 2; it changed the setting to feudal Japan and featured different Natials, more differences between masters, a deeper story mode, and improved graphics.

The Legend of Heroes: Trails of Cold Steel III includes a mini-game known as Vantage Masters, based on upon the systems of the game. The game's sequel, Trails of Cold Steel IV, features an updated version of it. The game returns once again in The Legend of Heroes: Trails into Reverie, which serves as finale to the arcs seen in both Trails of Cold Steel and The Legend of Heroes: Trails from Zero and Trails to Azure games.
