= The Legend of Heroes: Trails of Cold Steel – Northern War =

2023 anime series

- Promotional poster

The Legend of Heroes 閃の軌跡 Northern War (The Legend of Heroes: Sen no Kiseki Northern War)
- Created by: Nihon Falcom
- Anime television series
- Directed by: Hidekazu Sato
- Written by: Hideki Ryoga; Mao Emura
- Music by: Tsubasa Ito
- Studio: Tatsunoko Production
- Licensed by: Crunchyroll (Note: The series is distributed in North America, Latin America, United Kingdom through Crunchyroll UK and Ireland, Australia through Madman Anime, and Europe/Middle East/Africa through Crunchyroll EMEA.)
- Original network: Tokyo MX, AT-X, BS12 TwellV
- Original run: January 6, 2023 – March 24, 2023
- Episodes: 12
- Video game
- Developer: UserJoy Technology
- Publisher: Nihon Falcom
- Genre: Role-playing
- Platform: Android, iOS
- Released: JP: December 6, 2023; WW: May 29, 2024

The Legend of Heroes: Trails of Cold Steel – Northern War (Note: Japanese: The Legend of Heroes 閃の軌跡 Northern War, Hepburn: The Legend of Heroes: Sen no Kiseki Northern War) is a 2023 Japanese anime miniseries based on the Trails video game series by Nihon Falcom. The series follows a conflict between the Erebonian Empire and the North Ambria State and is set during the ellipsis between the video games Trails of Cold Steel II and III. It follows Lavian Winslet, who leads a small platoon of Martin Robinson, Iseria Frost, and Talion Drake within the Northern Jaegers mercenary corps.

Northern War was produced by Tatsunoko Production and had twelve episodes aired weekly from early January to late March 2023. The series was licensed and dubbed in English by Crunchyroll. A spin-off mobile gacha game by UserJoy Technology was released in Japan in December 2023 and worldwide in May 2024.

== Premise ==
The Legend of Heroes: Trails of Cold Steel – Northern War depicts the Northern War, a conflict between the Erebonian Empire and the North Ambria State, and placed during the ellipsis between the video games Trails of Cold Steel II and III. It follows Lavian Winslet, a girl born in North Ambria, a poor country in the northwest of Zemurian continent. She enlists in the Northern Jaegers, the largest mercenary corps in Zemuria to protect her hometown, while distinguishing herself from her grandfather, Vlad, the renounced hero who betrayed their country. Prior to the start of the anime, Lavian assembles a platoon with Martin S. Robinson, Iseria Frost and Talion Drake for a secret mission to Erebonia, an imperialistic country to the south, to gather information about an Erebonian hero that spells a threat to their country.

== Characters ==
Characters and voice cast
Character	Japanese actor	English actor	Ref.
Lavian Winslet	Makoto Koichi	Sarah Roach	
Martin S. Robinson	Yuichi Nakamura	Ben Balmaceda	
Iseria Frost	Sarah Emi Bridcutt	Anjali Kunapaneni	
Talion Drake	Yūki Ono	Chris Niosi	
Grak Gromash	Haruhiko Jō	Unknown	
Jeina Storm	Mie Sonozaki	Monica Rial	
Rogan Mugart	Takayuki Kondo	Christopher Wehkamp	
Rean Schwarzer (Note: Protagonist of the Trails of Cold Steel video games.)	Koki Uchiyama	Eric Vale (Note: Sean Chiplock was originally announced to reprise his role from the video games before being replaced.)	
Valimar (Note: Rean's Divine Knight, his sentient personal mecha, of which only seven exist.)	Unknown	Unknown	
Altina Orion	Inori Minase	Unknown (Note: Xanthe Huynh was originally announced to reprise her role from the video games before being replaced.)	
Ivano	Jun Fukushima	Ryan Colt Levy	
Tack	Ryuichi Kijima	Nazeeh Tarsha	
Millium Orion	Unknown	Unknown (Note: Michelle Marie was originally announced to reprise her role from the video games before being replaced.)	
Lechter Arundel	Unknown	Matt Shipman (Note: Max Mittelman voiced the character in episode 5.)	
Giliath Osborne	Unknown	Michael Sorich	
Rufus Albarea	Unknown	D. C. Douglas	
Wallace Bardias	Unknown	Alan Lee	
Aurelia Le Guin	Unknown	Valerie Arem	
Campanella	Unknown	Zach Aguilar	
Sara Valestein	Unknown	Unknown (Note: Carrie Keranen was originally announced to reprise her role from the video games before being replaced.)	

== Episode list ==
No.	Title	Directed by	Written by	Original release date
1	"Appears He… the Hero in Twilight"; Transliteration: "Daresokare wa...... Tasogare no Eiyū" (Japanese: 誰そ彼は...... 黄昏の英雄)	Yusaku Saotome	Chika Suzumura	January 6, 2023
2	"Gathers the Unpleasant Darkness"; Transliteration: "Tsudoishi Fukaina Shikkoku" (Japanese: 集いし不快な漆黒)	Kazuki Yokouchi	Chika Suzumura	January 13, 2023
3	"An Invitation to the Port City Engulfed In Darkness"; Transliteration: "Yami ni Ōwa reta Konpeki e no Shōtai" (Japanese: 闇に覆われた紺碧への招待)	Fumihiro Ueno	Shinsuke Ohnishi	January 20, 2023
4	"Breaking the Blue Crystal Ice"; Transliteration: "Aoi Kesshō no Uchitoke" (Japanese: 青い結晶の打ち解け)	Makoto Sokuza	Masaki Hiramatsu	January 27, 2023
5	"At the End of an Ashen Journey"; Transliteration: "Haiiro no Tabi no Hate ni" (Japanese: 灰色の旅の果てに)	Yusaku Saotome	Chika Shizumura	February 3, 2023
6	"Memories Burning Crimson"; Transliteration: "Guren ni Moesakarishi Kioku" (Japanese: 紅蓮に燃えさかりし記憶)	Kazuki Yokouchi	Shinsuke Ohnishi	February 10, 2023
7	"The Truth Coated in Lead"; Transliteration: "Kasane Nura reta Namariiro no Shinjitsu" (Japanese: 重ね塗られた鉛色の真実)	Hidehiko Kadota	Masaki Hiramatsu	February 17, 2023
8	"Pale White Castle at a Crossroads"; Transliteration: "Ketsui no Ma, Shirachaketa Jōka" (Japanese: 決意の間、白茶けた城下)	Shigeki Awai	Mao Emura	February 24, 2023
9	"The Ashy Curse Continues Past a Sealed Fate"; Transliteration: "Meiun Tsukite Nao Hatenu Sōhakuna Noroi" (Japanese: 命運尽きて尚果てぬ蒼白な呪い)	Hidekazu Sato, Yano Takanori	Shinsuke Ohnishi	March 3, 2023
10	"The Scent of Wheat Ears and the Silver of Revival"; Transliteration: "Minoru no Ka ga Michibiku Saiki no Gin" (Japanese: 穗の香が導く再起の銀)	Fumihiro Ueno	Masaki Hiramatsu	March 10, 2023
11	"The Divine Knight Arrives at the Gray"; Transliteration: "Kami, Nibiiro e Oritatsu" (Japanese: 騎神、鈍色へ降り立つ)	Yusaku Saotome	Mao Emura	March 17, 2023
12	"Dyed in Pure White"; Transliteration: "Masshiro ni Somaru" (Japanese: 真白に染まる)	Ken Ando	Mao Emura	March 24, 2023
