= The Legend of Heroes: Trails from Zero =

2010 video game

- Developer: Nihon Falcom
- Publisher: NIS America: JP: Nihon Falcom
- Director: Toshihiro Kondo
- Producer: Masayuki Kato
- Programmers: Toru Endo; Homare Karusawa; Katsuya Horimoto
- Artist: Katsumi Enami
- Writers: Hisayoshi Takeiri; Nobuhiro Hioki; Syuuji Nishitani
- Composers: Hayato Sonoda; Takahiro Unisuga; Saki Momiyama; Masanori Osaki
- Series: Trails
- Platforms: PlayStation Portable; Windows; PlayStation Vita; PlayStation 4; PlayStation 5; Nintendo Switch; Nintendo Switch 2
- Release: September 30, 2010: PlayStation Portable; JP: September 30, 2010; Windows; CHN: August 28, 2011; TW: September 10, 2011; JP: June 14, 2013; NA: September 27, 2022; EU: September 30, 2022; PlayStation Vita; JP: October 18, 2012; PlayStation 4; JP: April 23, 2020; NA: September 27, 2022; EU: September 30, 2022; AU: October 10, 2022; Nintendo Switch; AS: February 25, 2021; NA: September 27, 2022; EU: September 30, 2022; AU: October 10, 2022; JP: August 31, 2023; PS5, Switch 2; WW: September 10, 2026
- Genre: Role-playing
- Mode: Single-player

The Legend of Heroes: Trails from Zero (Note: Japanese: 英雄伝説 零の軌跡, Hepburn: Eiyū Densetsu: Zero no Kiseki) is a 2010 role-playing video game developed by Nihon Falcom. The game is the fourth installment of the Trails series, itself a part of the larger The Legend of Heroes series, and follows Trails in the Sky the 3rd (2007). Trails from Zero and its 2011 sequel, Trails to Azure, form the Crossbell arc of the series. The game takes place in Crossbell, a city-state located between two great powers fighting for control over it, and follows Lloyd Bannings and his colleagues Elie MacDowell, Randy Orlando, and Tio Plato. The four form the Special Support Section, a newly formed department of the Crossbell police.

Trails from Zero was first released in Japan for the PlayStation Portable before being ported to Windows for release in China in 2011. An enhanced port featuring improved visuals and additional voice acting was released for the PlayStation Vita in Japan as Zero no Kiseki: Evolution in 2012. The game received an English fan translation in 2020, which NIS America used as a base for an official version that was released for Nintendo Switch, PlayStation 4, and Windows in September 2022, with ports to the PlayStation 5 and Nintendo Switch 2 set for release on September 10, 2026.

== Plot ==
Trails from Zero is set three months after the end of The Legend of Heroes: Trails in the Sky the 3rd, in the city-state of Crossbell. Uneasily situated between two great powers—the Erebonian Empire and the Calvard Republic, both of which claim sovereignty over Crossbell—the city is riven by political tensions, corruption, and organized crime.

The protagonist, Lloyd Bannings, is a rookie police detective. Returning to Crossbell after finishing his training, he is assigned to the Special Support Section (SSS), a newly created branch of the city's police department, together with Elie MacDowell, heiress to a political dynasty, Randolph "Randy" Orlando, a laid-back ex-mercenary, and Tio Plato, a young girl and electronics genius. Assisted by Estelle and Joshua Bright, newly promoted bracers who have come to the city in search of their friend Renne, the SSS investigates the organized crime syndicates that dominate Crossbell. Eventually, they strike a major blow against the mafia outfit Revache when they disrupt a black market auction and rescue a child named KeA from being auctioned off. Unable to find information on KeA's background, the SSS care for her themselves.

A month later, the SSS discovers a new drug named Gnosis in circulation which grants supernatural abilities. Their commissioner informs them that Gnosis was pioneered years prior by D∴G, a demon-worshipping cult that experimented on children including Tio and Renne. Local pharmacologist Joachim Guenter reveals himself as the high priest of D∴G and uses magic to take control of the Gnosis users, laying siege to the city in an attempt to kidnap KeA, who he calls the cult's "Divine Child". Along with Estelle and Joshua, the SSS storm Guenter's hideout and fight him. He overdoses on Gnosis and transforms into a demon, trying to take them down with him, but Renne intervenes and defeats him. After Guenter dies, his mind control is lifted. Renne leaves for Liberl with Estelle and Joshua, the SSS are proclaimed the heroes of the city, and KeA remains with her new family.

== Development ==
Trails from Zero was first released in Japan for the PlayStation Portable and was later ported to Windows for release in China in 2011. It was also released for the PlayStation Vita in Japan as Zero no Kiseki: Evolution in October 2012. This version features improved visuals and more voice acting. The Evolution version received a remaster for the PlayStation 4, releasing in Japan as Zero no Kiseki Kai in April 2020. It was also released for the Nintendo Switch in China and South Korea by Clouded Leopard Entertainment in February 2021.

Due to a variety of reasons, Trails from Zero and its sequel, Trails to Azure, were not localized outside of Japan by the time of the Japanese release of Trails of Cold Steel. Falcom subsequently approached Xseed Games, who had previously localized Trails in the Sky, and requested that a localization of Trails of Cold Steel be prioritized instead, resulting in Trails from Zero and Trails to Azure being skipped. An English fan translation was released by a team known as "Geofront" in March 2020. An official English version by NIS America, using this as the base of the translation, was released for Nintendo Switch, PlayStation 4, and Windows in North America and Europe in September 2022, and Australasia on October 10. That version was also released in Japan for the Switch by Falcom on August 31, 2023.

== Reception ==
Reception

Aggregate score
Aggregator	Score
Metacritic	PC: 90/100; PS4: 80/100; NS: 86/100

Review scores
Publication	Score
Destructoid	8.5/10
Hardcore Gamer	4/5
HobbyConsolas	84/100
Nintendo Life	9/10
Nintendo World Report	8/10
Push Square	8/10
RPGamer	4.5/5
RPGFan	90/100
TouchArcade	4.5/5

Trails from Zero received "generally favorable" reviews, according to review aggregator Metacritic, with praise going to its story, cast of characters, combat mechanics, and music. Along with Trails to Azure, Comic Book Resources highlighted the game's "persistent overarching storyline, immersive and detailed settings, masterful character development [and] unique battle system". They noted that despite the lack of an official localization at the time, the plot and characters were integral to understanding later games in the series. Jason Schreier of Bloomberg considered its 2022 English release to be among the best games of the year.
