= The Legend of Heroes: Trails of Cold Steel II =

2014 video game

- Developer: Nihon Falcom (Note: Ported to the Nintendo Switch by Clouded Leopard Entertainment.)
- Publishers: Xseed Games: JP: Nihon Falcom (Note: Nintendo Switch version published by Clouded Leopard Entertainment in Japan.); EU: NIS America (PS3, Vita); EU: Marvelous Europe (PS4)
- Director: Takayuki Kusano
- Producer: Toshihiro Kondo
- Programmers: Nobuhiro Hioki; Toru Endo
- Writers: Hisayoshi Takeiri; Aichiro Miyata; Syuuji Nishitani
- Composers: Hayato Sonoda; Takahiro Unisuga; Saki Momiyama; Yukihiro Jindo; Toshiharu Okajima
- Series: Trails
- Engine: PhyreEngine
- Platforms: PlayStation 3; PlayStation Vita; Windows; PlayStation 4; Nintendo Switch
- Release: September 25, 2014: PlayStation 3, PS Vita; JP: September 25, 2014; NA: September 6, 2016; EU: November 11, 2016; Windows; WW: February 14, 2018; PlayStation 4; JP: April 26, 2018; NA: June 4, 2019; EU: June 7, 2019; Nintendo Switch; JP: August 5, 2021
- Genre: Role-playing
- Mode: Single-player

The Legend of Heroes: Trails of Cold Steel II (Note: Japanese: 英雄伝説 閃の軌跡II, Hepburn: Eiyū Densetsu: Sen no Kiseki Tsū) is a 2014 role-playing video game developed by Nihon Falcom. The game is the seventh installment of the Trails series, itself a part of the larger The Legend of Heroes series, and follows Trails of Cold Steel (2013).

It was first released in Japan for the PlayStation 3 and PlayStation Vita before being localized into English by Xseed Games in 2016. A Windows port by Xseed was released in February 2018, while a remastered version for the PlayStation 4 was released in Japan in April 2018 and worldwide in June 2019. A port for Nintendo Switch was released in Asia in 2021. A sequel, Trails of Cold Steel III, was released in late 2017.

== Gameplay ==
The gameplay of Trails of Cold Steel II is similar to the first Trails of Cold Steel game, being a traditional Japanese role-playing video game with turn-based battles. Game progression is no longer tied to the school schedule structure of the original, with the game now centered around traveling the world rather than attending classes. If the player has a completed game save file from the prior game, it has an effect in Cold Steel II, with certain events and dialogues playing out differently based on choices and relationships built in the first game.

== Plot ==
Beginning one month after the original Trails of Cold Steel and concurrently alongside the final chapter of Trails to Azure, Rean Schwarzer awakens from a month-long coma after being evacuated from Trista by Valimar. He makes it to his hometown of Ymir with the assistance of bracer Toval Randonneur, but quickly finds himself and his loved ones caught in the crossfire of the war. Rean's opponents are the Noble Alliance (backed by the Imperial Liberation Front), and Ouroboros, a secretive crime syndicate. Students from Thors Military Academy, including those from Class VII, have been scattered across the country; Rean resolves to find his classmates, put an end to the civil war, and save those he cares about.

After Rean gathers the scattered students, resolving conflicts across eastern Erebonia in the process, he leads them in liberating Thors from the Noble Alliance. During their journey, they find many parallels between the modern civil war and the War of the Lions, a civil war that took place 250 years ago in Erebonia and was ended by the former Awakener of Valimar, Dreichels the Lionheart who became emperor afterwards. The members of Class VII attack the Erebonian capital of Heimdallr to stop the Noble Alliance and end the war. They succeed, but at the cost of the life of Crow Armbrust, former member of Class VII and leader of the Imperial Liberation Front, who defects from the Alliance to save Erebonia's Crown Prince Cedric from the Divine Knight Testa-Rossa, cursed and corrupted into a monster called the Vermillion Apocalypse. Chancellor Osborne, believed to have been assassinated by Crow at the start of the war, arrives to seize control of the situation. He reveals his intent to take over Ouroboros's "Phantasmal Blaze Plan", annex Crossbell State, and that he is Rean's biological father. After the war, the Noble Faction's power is diminished while the Chancellor's is expanded.

Before the end of the school year, the members of Class VII overcome one final trial in the old schoolhouse. At the end of their first year, all Class VII members except Rean choose to graduate from Thors early, making a vow to improve in their respective specialties and face the impending turbulent times together.

== Development and release ==
Trails of Cold Steel II uses the PhyreEngine game engine. Trails of Cold Steel II was first released in Japan on September 25, 2014, for PlayStation 3 and PlayStation Vita. The game was localized into English by Xseed Games. Work on translating the game began in February 2015, with around 1.45 million characters to be translated. Translation took about a year, being about 95% complete by January 2016. Xseed added approximately 11,000 lines of English dialogue for its English release. The game was released for PS3 and Vita in North America on September 6, 2016, and in Europe on November 11. A port for Windows was released worldwide on February 14, 2018. This version features various enhancements such as support for 4K resolution, various graphical enhancements, and additional English voice acting.

A remastered version for the PlayStation 4, The Legend of Heroes: Trails of Cold Steel II: Kai, was released in Japan on April 26, 2018, and in North America and Europe in June 2019. A port for the Nintendo Switch, developed and published by Clouded Leopard Entertainment, was released in Japan and Asia on August 5, 2021.

== Reception ==
Reception

Aggregate score
Aggregator	Score
Metacritic	PS3: 90/100; VITA: 80/100; PC: 81/100; PS4: 78/100

Review scores
Publication	Score
Famitsu	31/40
Game Informer	8/10
Hardcore Gamer	4.5/5
RPGSite	9/10
RPGFan	88%

The Legend of Heroes: Trails of Cold Steel II received "generally favorable" reviews according to review aggregator Metacritic. Famitsu gave the PS3 and PS Vita versions of the game a score of 31/40. Chris Shrive of Hardcore Gamer strongly praised the game for being "a modern JRPG masterpiece" with "the perfect blend of the classic JRPG formula mixed with contemporary features" concluding that "the emphasis on story telling and immense cast of memorable characters make the large time commitment worthwhile". Kimberly Wallace of Game Informer was similarly positive about the game's story and characters, but complained about the game's dull dungeon design. Despite the shortcomings, she still felt that the game "takes the cast and story in such interesting directions and provides so much to do that it's hard to put down... [the game] makes me care so much about the characters and the world that it becomes easier to look past its flaws". Darren McPhail of RPGSite was similarly positive about the game stating "For fans of the previous Legend of Heroes games and especially the first Trails of Cold Steel, picking up Trails of Cold Steel 2 is a no-brainer easy recommendation. While this sequel is unevenly paced and lacks shocking plot twists until the conclusion, the Trails of Cold Steel games are some of the best of the genre and well worth a look for most hardcore RPG fans". All three reviewers agreed that, while it was possible to enjoy the game's story as a stand-alone experience, the story was better for people who had played the original Trails of Cold Steel first, due to their direct ties to one another.

=== Sales ===
In Japan, the game sold 86,283 physical retail copies on the PlayStation Vita and 65,498 retail copies on the PlayStation 3 within its debut release week. Within that week, the Vita version placed second among all software sales in Japan, while the PS3 version placed fifth. The PlayStation 4 version sold 11,345 copies during its first week on sale in Japan, placing it at number ten on the all format sales chart.
