= The Legend of Heroes: Trails Through Daybreak II =

2022 video game

- Developer: Nihon Falcom
- Publisher: NIS America: JP: Nihon Falcom
- Producer: Toshihiro Kondo
- Designer: Koutaro Honda
- Artist: Katsumi Enami
- Writers: Hisayoshi Takeiri; Yuuta Miyazaki; Yoshihiro Konda
- Composers: Hayato Sonoda; Shuntaro Koguchi; Takahiro Unisuga; Yukihiro Jindo; Mitsuo Singa
- Series: Trails
- Platforms: PlayStation 4; PlayStation 5; Windows; Nintendo Switch
- Release: PS4, PS5: JP: September 29, 2022; WW: February 14, 2025; Windows: AS: January 26, 2023; WW: February 14, 2025; Nintendo Switch: JP: July 25, 2024; WW: February 14, 2025
- Genre: Role-playing game
- Mode: Single-player

The Legend of Heroes: Trails Through Daybreak II (Note: Japanese: 英雄伝説 黎の軌跡Ⅱ -CRIMSON SiN-, Hepburn: Eiyū Densetsu: Kuro no Kiseki II Crimson Sin) is a 2022 role-playing video game developed by Nihon Falcom. The game is the twelfth installment of the Trails series, itself a part of the larger The Legend of Heroes franchise, and is a sequel to Trails Through Daybreak (2021).

Trails Through Daybreak II was released in Japan for the PlayStation 4 and PlayStation 5 in September 2022. A Windows port was released in Asia by Clouded Leopard Entertainment in January 2023, with an English version by NIS America, including a Nintendo Switch version, released in February 2025. A sequel, Trails Beyond the Horizon, was released in 2024.

== Plot ==
Sometime after the fall of Almata, Elaine Auclair recruits Van Arkride in order to investigate a series of bizarre murders which leads them into a mysterious man who can take a monstrous form similar to Van's Grendel. Both are killed in the encounter, but the Oct-Genesis at Agnès Claudel's possession rewinds time, saving their lives. The Arkride Solution Office once again come together to solve this new mystery, joining them are Swin Abel and Nadia Rayne, coming into conflict with the Garden-Master, the last surviving member of the Garden who is in league with the mysterious monster Grendel-Zolga, Cao Lee of Heiyue, and Ellroy Harwood who is training Ixs and Jorda, children of Gerard Dantès, to become enforcers for Ouroboros, with the Oct-Genesis resetting time whenever they hit a horrible dead end.

The group discover that the Garden-Master is Ace Rayne, Nadia's older brother and Swin's partner who was thought to be dead. Though it is eventually revealed to be a clone body possessed by Auguste Aldan, a Calvardian revolutionary who was executed due to ideological differences, with his spirit remaining and feeding on the negativity of all the souls who were wronged throughout history. Seeking to use the eighth and last Oct-Genesis as well as Grendel-Zolga and his AI Carmine Altra, who is a corrupted Lapis Rosenberg, to reshape history but is ultimately thwarted, allowing Swin and Nadia to have a moment with the spirit of the real Ace.

Van's group finally discover Grendel-Zolga as Dingo Brad, a journalist and old friend of Van who was murdered during one of Almata's operations, with his body being cloned to serve the Garden-Master but the personality of the original Dingo eventually took over and would indirectly aid the heroes. After his defeat, Dingo passes away peacefully, and everyone attend the anniversary celebration of Agnès' academy.

== Development and release ==
Trails Through Daybreak II is the sequel to Trails Through Daybreak and was developed by Nihon Falcom and released in Japan for the PlayStation 4 and PlayStation 5 on September 29, 2022. A Windows port in Traditional Chinese and Korean was released by on January 26, 2023.

An English version by NIS America was released in North America and Europe on February 14, 2025, for PlayStation 4, PlayStation 5, Nintendo Switch, and Windows. A demo version was released on January 24 for the PlayStation 4 and PlayStation 5, whose save data can be transferred to the full game.
