= Fan translation of video games =

Unofficially translated media

RPGe's translation of Final Fantasy V was one of the early major fan-translated works. Original Japanese is on the left; RPGe's translation is on the right.

In video gaming, a fan translation is an unofficial translation of a video game made by fans.

The fan translation practice grew with the rise of video game console emulation in the late 1990s. A community of people developed that were interested in replaying and modifying the games they played in their youth. The knowledge and tools that came out of this community allowed them to work with translators to localize video game titles that had never been available outside of their original country of origin.

Fan translations of video game console games are usually accomplished by modifying a single binary ROM image of the game. Fan translations of PC games, on the other hand, can involve translation of many binary files throughout the game's directory which are packaged and distributed as fan patch. In dealing with translations of console games, a console emulator is generally utilized to play the final product, although unofficial hardware, hardware mods or software mods can be used to run the translated ROM image on its native hardware.

== Purpose ==
The central focus of the fan translation community is historically of Japanese-exclusive computer and video games being made playable in English for the first time, and sometimes of games recently released in Japan that are import-worthy and are unlikely to be officially localized to English-speaking countries. It has since expanded to include other languages as well. Fan translations to English have provided a starting point for translations to many other languages.

Fan translations may also be done to titles that have received official localizations that fans perceive as flawed; for example, if the game had controversial content removed (such as Bionic Commando), or there were perceived "unnecessary" changes in plot and character names (such as Phantasy Star).

Some already translated RPGs are available on reproduction cartridges to play on the real hardware for some systems like the SNES.

== Origins ==
The earliest English fan translations were done by Oasis, a group formed by Dennis Lardenoye and Ron Bouwland, two Dutch fans of the MSX system. Konami's RPG SD Snatcher was translated in April 1993, and Dragon Slayer: The Legend of Heroes was translated in 1995. Their other projects include Fray, Rune Master 3, Xak - The Art of Visual Stage, Xak 2, Xak - The Tower of Gazzel, Ys, Ys II: The Final Chapter and Wanderers From Ys.

In Korea, many fan translations of games made by ELF Corporation were produced for DOS PCs, starting around 1996. These patches were successful and ELF hired some of the translations teams for official Korean releases later on.

These were possible before emulation on PCs became popular (or even adequate enough to play games) because the games were on floppy disks, and were therefore easier to distribute to the users, in comparison to ROM cartridges used by video game consoles (the MSX also used cartridges, but methods were discovered to copy the content onto floppy disks and other media too).

== Revival after emulation ==
The development of console emulators led to access to foreign video games. A revival began in 1996 when a group calling themselves Kowasu Ku formed under the lead of one "Hazama". The group stated plans to translate Final Fantasy V, but their efforts were never publicly released. Later that summer, a user called Demi announced work on a Final Fantasy V translation and founded Multiple Demiforce. It was eventually dropped in favor of Final Fantasy II (NES), a more manageable goal at that time. Demi and Som2Freak used Pasofami to post four screenshots of their work to Archaic Ruins, an emulation website. Shortly after, the translation stalled and the group disbanded.

Derrick Sobodash (Shadow) and David Timko both saw the Archaic Ruins website and contacted Som2Freak expressing interest in translating Final Fantasy V. He provided each with some primitive tools, and for the next few months, Shadow and Timko worked against each other. Both projects generated renewed interest in fan translation.

After months of working against each other, Shadow and Timko began cooperating. RPGe, the first major translation group was established on July 8 in the #ff5e IRC channel, on the EsperNet IRC network by Shadow, Timko, Hooie and Thermopyle. The start of RPGe sparked many other efforts to unify and within months, Translation Corporation, DeJap Translations and Starsoft Translations had formed.

RPGe's translation of Final Fantasy V was completed October 16, 1997 (version 0.96).

Notable fan translations include that of Mother 3, Fate/Extra CCC, Dragon Quest X, Final Fantasy II through VI, Seiken Densetsu 3, Bahamut Lagoon, Takeshi's Challenge, Clock Tower: The First Fear, Radical Dreamers, Bishoujo Senshi Sailor Moon: Another Story, Ace Attorney Investigations 2: Prosecutor's Gambit and The Great Ace Attorney: Adventures, Fire Emblem: Shadow Dragon and the Blade of Light through The Binding Blade as well as New Mystery of the Emblem, For the Frog the Bell Tolls, Danganronpa: Trigger Happy Havoc, Kingdom Hearts II Final Mix, Front Mission: Gun Hazard, Live A Live, Ripened Tingle's Balloon Trip of Love, Shining Force III Scenario 2 and Scenario 3 and Policenauts.

== Legal issues ==
It is unusual for copyright holders to object to fan translations. This is probably largely because the electronic games in question are generally not considered commercially viable in the target language, so the translation is rarely seen as a source of lost revenue.

In 1999, one early incident in which copyright holders took action involved the translation of the Windows game development toolkit RPG Maker 95. The Japanese company ASCII had their lawyers send a cease and desist e-mail to the translation group KanjiHack Translations, but unlike most translation groups, KanjiHack was caught linking to a site to illegally download the entire then-recently released RPG Maker 95 software (including a copy-protection crack). The group shut down immediately, but others eventually finished the project. Titles from the RPG Maker series were eventually localized and officially released in the US for the PlayStation and PlayStation 2.

In 2014, publisher Square Enix issued a cease and desist order to Sky, a romhacker who had completed a highly anticipated fan translation of the PSP game Final Fantasy Type 0, soon after they announced an HD version of the game for PlayStation 4 and Xbox One. This forced him to remove all posts and pages pertaining to the project (which were eventually restored months later). Sky claimed that Square Enix had made "threats and false accusations". According to Kotaku, Sky had released the translation early against the team's wishes, possibly to preempt any legal action following a localization announcement at E3, and Square Enix may have been forced to announce the HD version prematurely as a reaction to the patch's release.

In September 2022, translation group ZeroField, responsible for English translation spreadsheet and overlays for Trails games, received a cease and desist order from NIS America.

A popular belief in the fan translation community is that distributing only a binary patch, which must be applied to the full, original game, is legal. The reasoning is that the patch only contains the new data and directives for where it is to be placed, and does not have the original copyrighted material included in any form, and therefore it is useless unless the user applies it to a (copyrighted) ROM, the acquisition and legality of which they are left completely accountable for. This belief is untested in court. Regardless, the patch must still contain a translated script that is derived from the copyrighted script of the original, but this anti-software piracy attitude by the fan translation community may have convinced copyright holders to, by and large, turn a blind eye.

There have never been any legal cases involving fan translation issues, and such projects have been relatively widespread over the Internet for years. In recent years, anime fansubbers have started to attract the attention of some American anime distributors; as of 2004 one manga scanlator has been handed a cease and desist by a Japanese company, but most of this attention has been restricted to polite entreaties asking fan translators to refrain from dealing with licensed material. As with the fansub and scanlation scenes, most sites devoted to translation hacks will not acknowledge projects that compete with commercially available localizations, and respected groups will generally attempt to steer clear of projects that may see localization.

An article of Helbraun law firm remarks in the context of fan translations that redistributing complete games with adaptions most likely does not fall under fair use, while in patch form it might fall under fair use, but this was never tested in court.

== Game company acknowledgments ==
In July 2007, RPGamer released an interview they did with Koichiro Sakamoto, a game producer from Square Enix, acknowledging fan translations: "On a similar note, we told Mr. Sakamoto that a fan translation had been done some years ago for Front Mission 1, and asked how he felt about such efforts. The producer replied that he actually found them very encouraging – it's something the developers should be doing, but because they're not, the fans are doing it instead. He stated that he'd like to be able to give something back to the fans, and would like to thank personally each of the fans that worked on the translation". Clyde Mandelin, a professional localizer and lead of the Mother 3 fan translation project, received letters of thanks from employees of major game development companies for his translation work.

In 2010, publisher Xseed Games licensed and paid for the use of a fan translation of Ys: The Oath in Felghana (PC) in the PlayStation Portable port in order to offset the localization costs of such a "niche" game. Shortly after publishing it, Xseed Games went on to purchase three more fan-translated scripts: Ys I and Ys II for the PlayStation Portable release of Ys I & II Chronicles, and Ys Origin for Windows.

In 2010, Rising Star Games teamed up with Spanish fans of Fragile Dreams: Farewell Ruins of the Moon to translate the game's script.

In 2011, adult visual novel publisher 0verflow acknowledged the fan translation group (which later established itself as a publisher) Sekai Project and its efforts to localize School Days. Eventually, American bishoujo game publisher JAST USA licensed the game and paid for the use of Sekai Project's work in their release, offsetting the localization costs in a similar manner. JAST USA also licensed Xuse's Aselia the Eternal and paid the fan translation group Dakkodango Translations for use of their translation.

In 2010, the Japanese game company Minori sent two cease and desist emails to No Name Losers, a fan group that worked on an unauthorized translation patch of their game Ef: A Fairy Tale of the Two, but a partnership between Minori, No Name Losers, and American game publisher MangaGamer was later negotiated to allow the official release of Minori's games in English.

In 2021, NIS America reached an agreement with the fan translation group Geofront to use & license the latter's translations of The Legend of Heroes: Trails from Zero and The Legend of Heroes: Trails to Azure as a basis for official releases.

In 2024, Refint/games reached out to the fan translation group Geofront and licensed the latter’s translation of Ys vs. Trails in the Sky to publish the game internationally.

== Gaming culture and learning ==
While many studies covering fan translation examine the more technical aspects of extracting the text and manipulating it to translate it, some others focus on the literacy and language related practices gamers develop through their engagement in the fan translation of games. They adopt many roles, acquire and put into practice not only IT skills but also linguistic and sociocultural skills, and maintain interesting conversations online with fellow gamers that lead to meaningful and situated metalinguistic discussions on language chunks and translation strategies.

== See also ==
- Fan labor
- Reverse engineering
- Undubbing
