= The Legend of Heroes: Trails in the Sky the 3rd =

2007 video game

- Steam artwork
- Developers: Nihon Falcom; Paon DP (PSV)
- Publishers: Xseed Games: JP: Nihon Falcom; JP: Kadokawa Games (PSV); JP: Broadmedia (iOS/AND)
- Director: Toshihiro Kondo
- Producer: Masayuki Kato
- Programmers: Hideyuki Yamashita; Noriyuki Chiyoda
- Artist: Haccan
- Writers: Hisayoshi Takeiri; Shinichiro Sakamoto; Yoshihiro Konda
- Composers: Ryo Takeshita; Hayato Sonoda; Takahiro Unisuga; Yukihiro Jindo
- Series: Trails
- Platforms: Windows; PlayStation Portable; PlayStation 3; iOS; Android; PlayStation Vita
- Release: June 28, 2007: Windows; JP: June 28, 2007; WW: May 3, 2017 PlayStation Portable; JP: July 24, 2008 PlayStation 3; JP: June 27, 2013 iOS/Android; JP: April 26, 2016 PlayStation Vita; JP: July 14, 2016
- Genre: Role-playing
- Mode: Single-player

The Legend of Heroes: Trails in the Sky the 3rd (Note: Known in Japan as Sora no Kiseki the 3rd (Japanese: 英雄伝説空の軌跡 the 3rd, Hepburn: Eiyuu Densetsu: Sora no Kiseki the 3rd).) is a 2007 role-playing video game developed by Nihon Falcom. The game is the third installment of the Trails series, itself a part of the larger The Legend of Heroes series, and follows Trails in the Sky SC (2005) as the final entry of the Liberl trilogy arc.

Trails in the Sky the 3rd was released in Japan for Windows and the PlayStation Portable. It did not see an English release until 2017 due to the game's large amount of text necessary to translate. A port to the PlayStation 3 was released in 2013, while a remaster for the PlayStation Vita was released in 2016; both were only released in Japan.

== Gameplay ==
The game plays similarly to its predecessors, being a role-playing video game with turn-based battles, but this time enemies have affinities to the three higher elements of time, space and mirage. Other additions are the turn bonuses of "rush", allowing the player to take two actions at once, "guard", which nullifies any damage, "vanish", which makes a target disappear for a few turns, and "death", which causes attacks to instantly kill their target. Throughout the games' dungeons the player will find doors engraved with symbols of the moon, stars and the sun, which trigger, respectively, long story scenes, short story scenes, and mini-games. These scenes contain development for existing characters and foreshadowing for future events, and some feature battles.

Save data from the Windows, PSP, and PS3 versions of Second Chapter unlock bonus content when playing the 3rd. Additionally, save data for the 3rd is transferable from the PSP to the PS3, allowing the player to continue where they had left off.

== Plot ==
A year after the events of the previous game, Dominion of the Septian Church Kevin Graham is summoned back to Liberl to inspect artifacts recovered from the wreck of the Liber Ark. On the way, he learns that his childhood friend Ries Argent has been assigned to him as a squire. An artifact called the Recluse Cube turns on by itself while Kevin and Ries are present. Later, the two are sent to an otherworldly dimension called Phantasma. Exploring Phantasma, they learn that places from across Liberl are replicated inside, and other characters from the previous Sky games have also been summoned there. They work together to investigate the realm and find an escape.

Deep in Phantasma, the heroes discover a replica of the orphanage where Kevin, Ries, and Rufina, Ries' older sister, grew up together. Inside, Phantasma's ruler reveals herself as Rufina, intent on revenge against Kevin for accidentally killing her, and sends the two to a simulacrum of Gehenna, the underworld for tormented sinners. While fighting their way out, Ries helps Kevin come to terms with his past and awaken a stronger version of his Stigma, the power possessed by Dominions. He realizes that his Stigma activated the Recluse Cube, acting on his unconscious desire for punishment. The party confronts the corrupted Stigma and defeats it, opening a door to the outside world.

Optional scenes viewable throughout Phantasma introduce characters and concepts that are seen in later arcs. A significant subplot involves former Ouroboros enforcer Renne, a traumatized young girl who struggles with her desire for a family. When the party is leaving Phantasma, she challenges Estelle and Joshua to make her part of their family before running away.

== Development ==
The Legend of Heroes: Trails in the Sky was initially planned to be released as one singular game, but the size and scope grew so much that Falcom had to either pare down the game, or split it up. They chose the latter, and eventually split it into two parts, First Chapter (FC) and Second Chapter (SC). Development later started on an epilogue, which became the 3rd. While the first two entries focused on the more upbeat adventures of Estelle and Joshua, the 3rd shifted its focus on telling a darker story following different protagonists.

After FC's successful launch on Windows, Xseed Games showed renewed interest in localization of the 3rd, contingent on the success of SC. In 2013, Xseed partnered with translation company Carpe Fulgur to translate SC; the 3rd's release largely hinged on its success. Ken Berry, vice president of Xseed Games, stated that despite having the right to release the 3rd, they would be willing to allow others to translate them as well due to them being such large undertakings.

== Release ==
The Legend of Heroes: Trails in the Sky the 3rd was initially released in Japan for Windows on June 28, 2007. A port for the PlayStation Portable was released in Japan on July 24, 2008. A high definition port for the PlayStation 3 was released in Japan on June 27, 2013. iOS and Android versions were released by Broadmedia in Japan on April 26, 2016. A remaster, The Legend of Heroes: Trails in the Sky the Third Evolution, was developed by Paon DP and published by Kadokawa Games in Japan for the PlayStation Vita on July 14, 2016. An English localization of Trails in the Sky the 3rd by Xseed Games was released worldwide for Windows on May 3, 2017.

In 2011, publisher Aeria Games announced a mobile version of the Trails in the Sky games for North America, but no details have been released since the initial announcement. Xseed said that they had no connection to the potential Aeria Games release.

== Reception ==
Reception

Aggregate score
Aggregator	Score
Metacritic	83/100

Review scores
Publication	Score
RPGamer	3.5/5
RPGFan	85/100

Trails in the Sky the 3rd received "generally favorable" reviews according to review aggregator Metacritic. Upon release in Japan, the PlayStation Portable version received a score of 30/40 from video game magazine Famitsu.
