= The Legend of Heroes: Trails in the Sky SC =

2006 video game

- Developers: Nihon Falcom; Paon DP (PSV)
- Publishers: Xseed Games: JP: Nihon Falcom; JP: Kadokawa Games (PSV); JP: Broadmedia (iOS/AND)
- Director: Toshihiro Kondo
- Producer: Masayuki Kato
- Programmers: Hideyuki Yamashita; Noriyuki Chiyoda
- Artists: Haccan; Yuu Shiina
- Writers: Hisayoshi Takeiri; Shinichiro Sakamoto; Yoshihiro Konda
- Composers: Hayato Sonoda; Takahiro Unisuga; Ryo Takeshita; Yukihiro Jindo; Wataru Ishibashi
- Series: Trails
- Platforms: Windows; PlayStation Portable; PlayStation 3; PlayStation Vita; iOS; Android
- Release: March 9, 2006: Windows; JP: March 9, 2006; WW: October 29, 2015 PlayStation Portable; JP: September 27, 2007; NA: October 29, 2015; EU: November 10, 2015 PlayStation 3; JP: April 25, 2013 PlayStation Vita; JP: December 10, 2015 iOS/Android; JP: March 23, 2016
- Genre: Role-playing
- Mode: Single-player

The Legend of Heroes: Trails in the Sky SC (Note: Known in Japan as The Legend of Heroes: Sora no Kiseki SC. (Note: Japanese: 英雄伝説 空の軌跡 SC, Hepburn: Eiyū Densetsu: Sora no Kiseki SC)) is a 2006 role-playing video game developed by Nihon Falcom. The game is the second installment of the Trails series, itself a part of the larger The Legend of Heroes series, and follows Trails in the Sky (2004). It was first released in Japan for Windows in 2006 before releasing for the PlayStation Portable the following year.

Trails in the Sky SC did not see an English release until 2015 due to the large amount of text necessary to translate and localize. A high-definition port to the PlayStation 3 was released in 2013, while a remaster for the PlayStation Vita was released in 2015; both were only released in Japan. An English Windows version was released in 2015. A sequel, Trails in the Sky the 3rd, was released in 2007. A remake, Trails in the Sky 2nd Chapter, was released for Nintendo Switch, Nintendo Switch 2, PlayStation 5, and Windows in September 2026.

== Gameplay ==
The game plays similarly to its predecessor, being a role-playing video game with turn-based battles. Several new features were added, most notably being the addition of chain crafts, attacks in which up to four members of the party may attack enemies in a simultaneous attack.

== Synopsis ==
The game's story directly follows the events of The Legend of Heroes: Trails in the Sky, immediately picking up the story following its ending. As with the previous game, it is set in the nation of Liberl.

=== Plot ===
In the aftermath of the previous game's ending, Joshua has disappeared. After completing training with the Bracer Guild, Estelle sets out to find him. Along the way, she encounters agents of Ouroboros known as Enforcers, who are assisting Weissmann with the search for the Aureole, and receives aid from Kevin Graham, a priest of the Septian Church. Estelle is kidnapped during a raid on an Ouroboros facility and taken prisoner on the airship Glorious, where she meets Loewe, a former Enforcer associate of Joshua. Loewe recounts how he and Joshua lived in an Erebonian village called Hamel, and ended up as the only survivors of a false flag operation used by Erebonia as an excuse to go to war with Liberl. In the aftermath, the two were discovered by Weissmann and taken into Ouroboros, while the Hamel incident was covered up as part of a ceasefire agreement. Estelle is eventually rescued by Joshua, and the two reconcile.

Weissmann and the Enforcers then raise the Liber Ark, an ancient floating city where the Aureole is housed, causing a country-wide power outage due to the Aureole absorbing orbal energy and almost leading to another Erebonian invasion. After traveling to the city by airship and fighting through the Enforcers, including Loewe, the party reach Weissmann, who fuses with the Aureole and creates a magical barrier around himself. Loewe appears and confronts Weissmann about his involvement in the Hamel incident, then sacrifices himself to shatter the barrier. Weissmann is defeated and flees, while the Aureole disappears, causing the Liber Ark to begin collapsing. As the party evacuates the city, Kevin corners Weissmann and executes him, revealing that he is a high-ranking knight of the church. After the incident, Estelle and Joshua set out on a journey across the continent to continue their growth as Bracers.

== Localization ==
In 2010, Xseed Games acquired the English localization rights to all three games in the Trails in the Sky series. The first game, however, proved to be a massive undertaking, having over 1.5 million Japanese characters to be translated, and did not meet Xseed's sales goals. The unfavorable "large undertaking, low payoff" ratio, if continued, would put them out of business. Technical issues also complicated release; the game's massive size necessitated a two disc release, which in turn caused issues releasing the game on PlayStation Network for digital download, and the decline of PlayStation Portable's presence in North America made it difficult to proceed with a multiple disc physical release (a rare occurrence for the system). Xseed stated that while they were not cancelling the English release of Second Chapter, they could not keep it as a main focus and needed to work on other games to maintain financial stability.

In September 2013, Xseed reconfirmed their intentions to release the game in English in North America. With the issues concerning the digital version solved, and the company's success with releasing Ys games on Windows, Xseed intended to release digitally for Windows and PlayStation Portable, and on the PlayStation Vita via backward compatibility. Xseed received assistance with the game's translation by Carpe Fulgur who had previously localized Recettear: An Item Shop's Tale and Chantelise – A Tale of Two Sisters. The English localization was initially intended to release by mid-2014, but was later revised to release by the end of 2014. Carpe Fulgur head Andrew Dice said that progress in translating the game was slowed by struggles in his personal life. Dice handed over his work for Xseed employees to finish up, delaying the game into 2015. The script was edited by Xseed's Jessica Chavez. She noted that the English script came up to 716,401 words, which is roughly the size of 10 novels, longer than the entire The Lord of the Rings trilogy (455,125 words) and War and Peace (587,287 words).

== Release ==
The game was released in Japan for Windows on March 9, 2006 and for PlayStation Portable on September 27, 2007. Japan later received a PlayStation 3 port on April 25, 2013. English localizations were released for Windows and PSP on October 29, 2015. A remaster, The Legend of Heroes: Trails in the Sky SC Evolution, was developed by Paon DP and published by Kadokawa Games in Japan for the PlayStation Vita on December 10, 2015. iOS and Android versions were released by Broadmedia in Japan on March 23, 2016.

== Trails in the Sky 2nd Chapter ==
Trails in the Sky 2nd Chapter
- Developer: Nihon Falcom
- Publishers: JP: Nihon Falcom; NA: GungHo; EU: Clear River Games
- Director: Toshihiro Kondo
- Producer: Masayuki Kato
- Programmers: Noriyuki Chiyoda; Toru Endo; Masaya Imura; Takayuki Kusano; Hideyuki Yamashita
- Artists: Yuu Shiina; Haccan
- Writers: Masayasu Ogiso; Syunsei Shikata; Aichiro Miyata; Yoshihiro Konda; Shinichiro Sakamoto; Hisayoshi Takeiri
- Composers: Takahiro Unisuga; Ryo Takeshita; Hayato Sonoda; Yukihiro Jindo
- Series: Trails
- Platforms: Nintendo Switch; Nintendo Switch 2; PlayStation 5; Windows
- Release: September 17, 2026
- Genre: Role-playing
- Mode: Single-player

Trails in the Sky 2nd Chapter, a remake following Trails in the Sky 1st Chapter, released on the Nintendo Switch, Nintendo Switch 2, PlayStation 5, and Windows on September 17, 2026. The remake adds a new graphical redesign, a re-orchestrated soundtrack,a full English and Japanese voice cast, and overall quality-of-life improvements. The remake also adds new gameplay features including new moves in combat, a photo mode, and an overhauled fishing minigame.

== Reception ==
Reception

Aggregate score
Aggregator	Score
Metacritic	PC: 80/100; PSP: 76/100

Review scores
Publication	Score
RPGamer	4/5
Gamer.nl	9/10
PlayStation Universe	8.5/10
RPGFan	PC: 88% PSP: 82%

Trails in the Sky SC received "generally favorable" reviews according to review aggregator website Metacritic.

=== Original Release ===
RPGFan gave the imported Japanese version an 82% score, praising the gameplay, writing, and characters, but criticizing the dated presentation and cliché main plot compared to Crisis Core, Final Fantasy Tactics, and Xenosaga, concluding: "Those willing to see beyond the somewhat outdated presentation and cliché main storyline will find a slightly old school, yet incredibly charming RPG with solid mechanics, likeable characters and a well written story". RPGFan later gave the English version an 88% score, praising the gameplay, story, writing, characters, and soundtrack. They felt that it was "robustly realized and populated by an endless stream of compelling characters", and said "Trails in the Sky approaches the pinnacle of traditional JRPG design".

Gamer.nl stated that the "story is epic, the localization makes characters into persons and everything combined makes this game a must have for JRPG lovers and gamers that appreciate a good story". RPGamer said that "Falcom's writers do a superb job of giving the many characters distinct personalities" and appreciated "the full scope of this series, which takes time to develop pieces of its world in detail", concluding that the "two Trails in the Sky games show how rewarding the series can be". PlayStation Universe said it is a "superb second chapter with a fantastic storyline, great characters and compelling combat system".

=== 2026 Remake ===
Trails in the Sky 2nd Chapter has received "universal acclaim" from critics based on the review aggregator website Metacritic. Associate review aggregator OpenCritic has gained "mighty" approval after evaluation, with a 97% recommendation from critics.

In IGN's George Yang, they applauded the game's effort of not forcing in new side-content "simply for the sake of having something new" commenting that, "It’s a streamlined adventure that’s easy to follow". They also gave cheers to the art-direction and animation for its bolder and less-awkward direction saying it, "brings bolder colors and a new vision for familiar worlds" and "animations look a lot less awkward in both gameplay and cutscenes" while going on to say they "add weight for its more serious, pivotal moments". They also enjoyed the game's "old-school RPG approach" admiring that remake "staunchly sticks to its roots" In particular though, they weren't fond of the pacing of the last chapter from "fast travel points that you unlocked before disappear". Overall though, they extremely satisfied of the remake, calling it a "quintessential Trails game and RPG in its own right."

In Game Informer's review Hayes Madsen praised the writing and story, stating that "In every regard, the story and writing have been spruced up" while noting that "The overall narrative of 2nd Chapter remake is exactly the same as the original game, although it’s been very slightly tweaked here and there and enhanced with some new content." They were particularly admiring Estelle's character complexity stating that her "complex character arc is so smartly explored; from her learning to stand on her own, without Joshua and her father’s help, to her endless optimism." Though they did criticize the gameplay's slightly dated design noting that the "occasionally dated RPG design rears its head, in the form of dungeons that can feel just a tad too long." But overall, they saw the remake that "expertly enhances everything about the original, and calling it, "one of the best RPGs of the year", and "an RPG powerhouse that can stand alongside the genre’s greats".

2nd Chapter received a nomination for Best Remake/Remaster at the 44th Golden Joystick Awards as well as a nomination for Best Role Playing Game at The Game Awards 2026.
