= The Legend of Heroes: Trails Beyond the Horizon =

2024 video game

- Developer: Nihon Falcom
- Publishers: NIS America: JP: Nihon Falcom; AS: Clouded Leopard Entertainment
- Producer: Toshihiro Kondo
- Designer: Yoshihiro Konda
- Programmers: Yuuki Hirata; Rui Zhang; Shingo Maekawa; Hiroyuki Yaguchi; Masatoshi Kurihara; Nobuhiro Hioki
- Artist: Katsumi Enami
- Writers: Hisayoshi Takeiri; Syunsei Shikata; Shinobu Takahashi; Yuuta Miyazaki; Sumire Abe; Miho Nara; Syun Kubota
- Composers: Hayato Sonoda; Shuntaro Koguchi; Takahiro Unisuga; Yukihiro Jindo; Mitsuo Singa
- Series: Trails
- Platforms: PlayStation 4; PlayStation 5; Windows; Nintendo Switch; Nintendo Switch 2
- Release: PS4, PS5: JP: September 26, 2024; WW: January 15, 2026; Windows: AS: January 23, 2025; WW: January 15, 2026; Switch, Switch 2: WW: January 15, 2026
- Genre: Role-playing game
- Mode: Single-player

The Legend of Heroes: Trails Beyond the Horizon (Note: Japanese: 英雄伝説 界の軌跡 -Farewell, O Zemuria-, Hepburn: Eiyū Densetsu: Kai no Kiseki Farewell, O Zemuria) is a 2024 role-playing video game developed by Nihon Falcom. The game is the thirteenth installment of the Trails series, itself a part of the larger The Legend of Heroes franchise, and is a sequel to Trails Through Daybreak II (2022).

Trails Beyond the Horizon was released in Japan for the PlayStation 4 and PlayStation 5 in September 2024. A Chinese version released for Windows by Clouded Leopard Entertainment in January 2025, while an English version by NIS America, including Nintendo Switch, Nintendo Switch 2, and Windows versions, released in January 2026.

== Plot ==
In the year 1209 of the Septian Calendar, with Professor Epstein's prediction of the end at hand, the world of Zemuria is preparing for a historical breakthrough heralded by the Republic of Calvard; Project Startaker, humanity finally reaching outer space. With this project attracting the attention of Van Arkride and his solutions office, as well as Rean Schwarzer of Thors Class VII from the Empire of Erebonia, and Kevin Graham of the Septian Church investigating Professor Latoya Hamilton for actions that have had her branded a heretic. Each of these groups act in separate routes throughout the game, while occasionally convening in the "Grim Garten" simulated reality which has been overtaken by Ouroboros.

It is revealed that President Roy Gramheart's true goal is the destruction of Laegjarn's Chest, the Sept-Terrion of Time, which resides far above in outer space. It has surrounded the Zemurian continent with a barrier and resets time to the aftermath of the Great Collapse (Septian Calendar Year 0) when humanity reaches the level of technology to achieve and perform human spaceflight, and when humanity's "SiN" value reaches a certain point. The process is named the Grand Reset, and has already happened 19,999 times.

Gramheart's plan fails, due to Kincaid having put in state transposition the Oct-Geneses out for replicas. He reveals himself as the Grendel Shaddai, revealing he and Agnès Claudel, Gramheart's daughter and Epstein's adoptive granddaughter, had betrayed Gramheart as they were working for Hamilton - who thought Gramheart's plan wouldn't work. The Chest repairs itself after being destroyed, with Hamilton's group putting their own plan into motion. Agnès uses the real Oct-Geneses and Trion Tower to hack the Grand Reset, limiting its effect and saving the current loop's space-time. Grendel Shaddai, meanwhile, prevents Van's group from stopping her. This potentially comes at the cost of her own existence, as is shown during the credits her first meeting with Van at the beginning of the first Daybreak game where she disappears into sparkles.

== Development and release ==
Trails Beyond the Horizon is a part of the Trails series, itself a part of the larger The Legend of Heroes franchise which itself is part of the Dragon Slayer saga, and is a sequel to Trails Through Daybreak II (2022). The game was developed by Nihon Falcom and released in Japan for the PlayStation 4 and PlayStation 5 on September 26, 2024. An International version, including a Chinese version, was released for Windows by Clouded Leopard Entertainment on January 23, 2025. An English version by NIS America, including additional Nintendo Switch, Nintendo Switch 2, and Windows versions, was released on January 15, 2026.

== Reception ==
Reception

Aggregate score
| Aggregator | Score |
|---|---|
| OpenCritic | 92% recommend |

Review score
| Publication | Score |
|---|---|
| IGN | 8/10 |
