= Trails (series) =

Video game franchise

- 20th anniversary logo. Each game in the series uses its own styling.
- Genre: Role-playing game
- Developer: Nihon Falcom
- Publishers: JP: Nihon Falcom; AS: Clouded Leopard Entertainment (Note: Chinese and Korean language releases of all titles from Trails from Zero onward); WW: Xseed Games (Note: Liberl arc, plus Trails of Cold Steel I and II); WW: NIS America (Note: Crossbell arc and Trails of Cold Steel III onward); NA: GungHo (Note: Trails in the Sky 1st Chapter and 2nd Chapter)
- Producer: Toshihiro Kondo
- Composer: Falcom Sound Team jdk
- Platforms: Windows, PlayStation Portable, PlayStation 3, PlayStation Vita, PlayStation 4, Nintendo Switch, PlayStation 5, Nintendo Switch 2
- First release: Trails in the Sky; June 24, 2004
- Latest release: Trails in the Sky 2nd Chapter; September 17, 2026
- Parent series: The Legend of Heroes

Trails, known as Kiseki (Note: Japanese: 軌跡) in Japan, is a series of science fantasy role-playing video games by Nihon Falcom and is part of the larger The Legend of Heroes franchise. Trails is set on the continent of Zemuria and features story arcs set across the nations of Liberl (Trails in the Sky), Crossbell (Trails from Zero and Trails to Azure), Erebonia (Trails of Cold Steel and Trails into Reverie), Calvard (Trails Through Daybreak and Trails Beyond the Horizon), and others. The series began in 2004, with 13 main entries and two remakes having been produced since.

Trails primarily features turn-based combat, with spin-offs and more recent entries featuring more action gameplay. The series was conceived by Falcom to have the most ambitious narrative in gaming, with producer Toshihiro Kondo considering it his life's work. Trails games were released only in Asia until the 2010s, when English versions were published by Xseed Games and NIS America. The series had sold ten million copies by 2026. Manga, anime, and other canonical media have also been released. Trails is projected to end with its final entry by 2032.

== Overview ==
Trails is a series of role-playing video games by Nihon Falcom set in a science fantasy universe. It began as the sixth entry in Falcom's The Legend of Heroes franchise with the release of The Legend of Heroes VI: Trails in the Sky in 2004. Despite that, it had no narrative connection with prior Legend of Heroes games and is considered its own distinct franchise. The Trails games are set within a few years of each other and follow an overarching narrative, with the events of a few entries crossing over into another. The series was conceived by Falcom to have the most ambitious story in video games, with company president and series producer Toshihiro Kondo considering it to be his life's work. The games are made using a proprietary game engine known as the Falcom Developer Kit (FDK), with the exception being Sony's PhyreEngine used for the Trails of Cold Steel games and Trails into Reverie. The series is heavily influenced by anime and features several archetypes and tropes common to it.

Trails is set across several locations on the continent of Zemuria, such as the Liberl Kingdom, the city-state of Crossbell, the Erebonian Empire, and the Calvard Republic, among others. Zemuria is home to several groups, factions, and organizations, such as the Bracer's Guild, the Septian Church, the secret society of Ouroboros, mercenary groups known as Jaegers, and several more. The series is set half a century after the discovery of orbal energy, an analog to electric power. This led to a technological revolution caused by the invention of Orbments, mechanical devices varying greatly in size and scope that run off orbal energy, powering everyday appliances up to mecha and other large machinery. Orbal energy also allowed for the casting of magic-like "arts", which exist in seven elemental forms. Trails also features sociopolitical elements, with subjects such as imperialism, classism, and immigration being a part of the narrative. In contrast with many other role-playing games, nearly every non-playable character in the series has a name, with most having their own character arcs of varying degrees of importance to the main plot.

== Gameplay ==
The combat of Trails is turn-based with tactical elements. Shown here are Trails in the Sky (2004) and Trails Through Daybreak (2021).

The combat of Trails is turn-based with tactical elements. Unlike most other turn-based games, the series lacks random encounters as most enemies are visible on the overworld. Combat takes place on a large grid, with characters only able to move across a set number of squares or perform a single ability each turn. Turns are listed on a timeline on the screen, which can be manipulated with certain abilities. In addition to basic attacks and item usage, every character has abilities known as Crafts and Arts. Crafts are unique to each character and are usually unlocked or strengthened by leveling up. S-Crafts are a character's ultimate ability fueled by a meter that builds as they deal and take damage. When full, players can use it at any time to bypass the turn order to perform skills such as dealing large amounts of damage or supporting their party with healing and buffs.

Arts are magic-like spells that are powerful but take time to cast. Rather than being unique to any specific character or monster like Crafts, Arts are determined by the type and specific arrangement of Quartz, items similar to Materia from Final Fantasy VII. Each successive game usually introduces new gameplay mechanics, such as the addition of Persona-like social events in Trails of Cold Steel or the optional action-based combat system in Trails Through Daybreak.

== Games ==
Release timeline
| 2004 | Trails in the Sky |
2005
| 2006 | Trails in the Sky SC |
| 2007 | Trails in the Sky the 3rd |
2008
2009
| 2010 | Trails from Zero |
| 2011 | Trails to Azure |
2012
| 2013 | Trails of Cold Steel |
| 2014 | Trails of Cold Steel II |
2015
2016
| 2017 | Trails of Cold Steel III |
| 2018 | Trails of Cold Steel IV |
2019
| 2020 | Trails into Reverie |
| 2021 | Trails Through Daybreak |
| 2022 | Trails Through Daybreak II |
2023
| 2024 | Trails Beyond the Horizon |
| 2025 | Trails in the Sky 1st Chapter |
| 2026 | Trails in the Sky 2nd Chapter |

Trails is split into four interconnected story arcs: Trails in the Sky, (Note: Sora no Kiseki in Japan.) Crossbell, Trails of Cold Steel, (Note: Sen no Kiseki in Japan.) and Trails Through Daybreak. (Note: Kuro no Kiseki in Japan.) The series also has a few spin-offs, some of which feature other styles of gameplay or are considered non-canonical.

=== Liberl arc (Trails in the Sky) ===
The first arc of the series, Trails in the Sky, consists of three games. They are set within the Liberl Kingdom and primarily follow Estelle Bright and her adopted brother Joshua, members of the Bracer's Guild, a civilian peacekeeping and monster-hunting organization. The first game, Trails in the Sky, was released in Japan in 2004 for Windows and for the PlayStation Portable (PSP) in 2006. The second game, Trails in the Sky SC, (Note: SC standing for second chapter.) continues the plot of the first and was released in Japan for Windows in 2006 and the PSP the following year. The third game, Trails in the Sky the 3rd, follows Septian Church agent Kevin Graham, who is sent to an otherworldly dimension known as Phantasma alongside many characters from the previous two games. Sky the 3rd also features vignettes exploring character backstories as well as foreshadowing plot elements explored in later arcs. It was released in Japan in 2007 for Windows and the PSP in 2008. A 3D remake of the first game, Trails in the Sky 1st Chapter, released worldwide for Nintendo Switch, Nintendo Switch 2, PlayStation 5, and Windows in 2025. A remake of the sequel, Trails in the Sky 2nd Chapter, released for the same platforms in 2026.

In 2010, Xseed Games acquired the rights to localize and publish the trilogy in English. Despite the first game being finished in 2011, SC and the 3rd were not released until the mid-2010s due to several challenges during the localization process, such as slow communication with Falcom and occupational burnout due to the size of their scripts, with the first game alone having over 1.5 million Japanese characters.

=== Crossbell arc (Trails from Zero / Trails to Azure) ===
The Crossbell arc consists of two games. They are set in Crossbell, a city-state located between the great powers of Erebonia and Calvard. It follows rookie police investigator Lloyd Bannings and the Special Support Section, consisting of himself, Elie McDowell, Randy Orlando, and Tio Plato, as they protect the city from criminal activity and the geopolitical situation that looms over it. The first game, Trails from Zero, was released in Japan for the PSP in 2010. The second, Trails to Azure, was released in Japan for the PSP in 2011.

The duology did not see official English release for over a decade until NIS America took over rights to the series' English localization in 2019. They released Trails from Zero in 2022 and Trails to Azure in 2023 for PlayStation 4, Nintendo Switch, and Windows. Unlike other English language releases in the Trails series, the Crossbell arc lacks English audio and only includes English subtitles with Japanese audio.

=== Erebonia arc (Trails of Cold Steel / Trails into Reverie) ===
The Trails of Cold Steel arc follows Rean Schwarzer and Class VII, a specialized group of students attending Thors Military Academy in the Erebonian Empire. The first game, Trails of Cold Steel was released for the PlayStation 3 and PlayStation Vita in Japan in 2013. Trails of Cold Steel II is a direct continuation of the first game and was released for the PlayStation 3 and Vita in 2014.

The third and fourth games, Trails of Cold Steel III and IV, follow Rean in his new role as an instructor of a new Class VII at a branch campus of Thors. Cold Steel III was released for the PlayStation 4 (PS4) in Japan in 2017, while Cold Steel IV was released in the following year. A fifth game, Trails into Reverie, was released in 2020 and acts as an epilogue to both the Crossbell and Erebonia arcs and follows Rean, Lloyd, and a masked character known as C.

English versions of Cold Steel and Cold Steel II were released by Xseed Games in 2015 and 2016, respectively. NIS America released Cold Steel III in 2019, IV in 2020, and Trails into Reverie in 2023. A box set containing all five games was released in Japan for the PS4 in July 2022.

=== Calvard arc (Trails Through Daybreak / Trails Beyond the Horizon) ===
Trails Through Daybreak follows Van Arkride, a mix of a detective and bounty hunter known as a Spriggan, and high schooler Agnes Claudel, who hires Van to search for eight artifacts that hold the key to solving an apocalyptic mystery. The arc is set in Calvard and is considered the start of the second half of the series. The first game, Trails Through Daybreak, was released in Japan for the PlayStation 4 in 2021. It features an action-based battle system as well as updates to the traditional turn-based system. An English version was released by NIS America in July 2024 in addition to a Nintendo Switch version.

A sequel, Trails Through Daybreak II, was released in Japan for the PlayStation 4 and PlayStation 5 in September 2022 and for the Switch in July 2024. The English version released in February 2025. A third game, Trails Beyond the Horizon, was released in Japan in September 2024 and worldwide in January 2026. A sequel to Trails Beyond the Horizon is planned to end the Calvard arc.

== Spin-offs and other media ==
Trails has seen several spin-offs and works in other types of media, including manga, audio dramas, and anime. Ys vs. Trails in the Sky is a crossover fighting game featuring characters from Trails and Falcom's Ys series. It was released exclusively in Japan in July 2010 but received an English fan translation patch in October 2021. The Legend of Nayuta: Boundless Trails was released in Japan in July 2012 and worldwide in 2023. It does not take place within Zemuria and also differs from the rest of the series by being an action role-playing game. The Legend of Heroes: Trails at Sunrise is a Japanese-only gacha game developed by UserJoy Technology. It was first released in 2016 as a browser game before being ported to other platforms. An original video animation adaptation of Trails in the Sky SC was produced by Kinema Citrus. Part one was released in November 2011 while the second was released in February 2012. They were licensed by Sentai Filmworks for release in North America that same year. A 12-episode anime series produced by Tatsunoko Production, The Legend of Heroes: Trails of Cold Steel – Northern War, aired in early 2023. A mobile game based on the anime was released in Japan in December 2023 and worldwide in May 2024.

Several manga adaptations of games in the series have been released. Trails in the Sky also received a novelization. Other manga, such as The Legend of Heroes: Trails from Zero Pre-Story -The Ring of Judgment- and Trails in the Sky Gaiden: The Tale of Loewe, are original works that provide backstory to certain characters. Several characters from the series also appeared in Minna Atsumare! Falcom Gakuen, a four-part comedy manga which later saw two short anime adaptations in the mid-2010s. Audio drama adaptations of the games have also been produced, with a few set between the games and filling in details glossed over. Transcripts of two Trails of Cold Steel dramas were translated by Xseed Games and published online as promotional material for Trails of Cold Steel II. A 2.5D musical based on Trails of Cold Steel ran in January 2017. The Legend of Heroes: Trails of Destiny, a tabletop game designed by Promethium Books, was released in 2024. A trading card game by TCG Corporation was released in Japan in November 2024.

== Reception ==
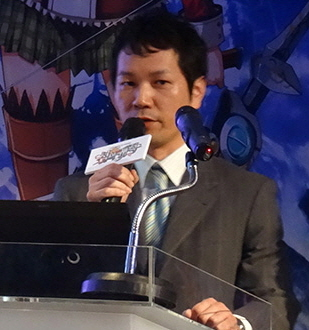
Falcom president and series producer Toshihiro Kondo considers Trails to be his life's work.

Trails has been praised for its character arcs and worldbuilding, with its scope and sense of continuity being compared to the A Song of Ice and Fire novels by George R. R. Martin, the Forgotten Realms setting for Dungeons & Dragons, and the Marvel Cinematic Universe. Despite the series' English localization being praised for their quality, their slow release pace has been criticized, with them tending to lag years behind the original Japanese games. The music written for the series by Falcom Sound Team jdk, the company's team of composers, has also been praised.

Characters or other elements from Trails have been featured in crossover promotions with other games, including Monster Hunter Frontier G, Chain Chronicle V, Dead or Alive 5, Fantasy Earth Zero, Langrisser Mobile, Utawarerumono: Zan, Valkyrie Anatomia, and a few Japanese mobile games. Characters from the series were also featured in a 2019 collaboration event with VREX, a virtual reality game arcade and café in Japan. As of 2021, a list of Trails characters was the largest article on the Japanese Wikipedia at over 440,000 characters. As of 2026, the series had sold ten million copies worldwide.
