= The Legend of Heroes: Trails into Reverie =

2020 video game

- Developer: Nihon Falcom
- Publisher: NIS America: JP: Nihon Falcom (Note: Switch and Windows versions published in Japan by Clouded Leopard Entertainment.)
- Directors: Takayuki Kusano; Hisayoshi Takeiri
- Producer: Toshihiro Kondo
- Programmer: Atsushi Oosaki
- Writers: Yuuta Miyazaki; Syunsei Shikata; Lanfeng Li
- Composers: Hayato Sonoda; Takahiro Unisuga; Shuntaro Koguchi; Yukihiro Jindo; Mitsuo Singa
- Series: Trails
- Engine: PhyreEngine
- Platforms: PlayStation 4; Nintendo Switch; Windows; PlayStation 5
- Release: August 27, 2020: PlayStation 4; JP: August 27, 2020; NA/EU: July 7, 2023; AU: July 14, 2023; Switch; JP: August 26, 2021; NA/EU: July 7, 2023; AU: July 14, 2023; Windows; JP: August 26, 2021; WW: July 7, 2023; PlayStation 5; NA/EU: July 7, 2023; AU: July 14, 2023; JP: August 21, 2025
- Genre: Role-playing
- Mode: Single-player

The Legend of Heroes: Trails into Reverie (Note: Japanese: 英雄伝説 創の軌跡, Hepburn: Eiyū Densetsu: Hajimari no Kiseki) is a 2020 role-playing video game developed by Nihon Falcom. The game is the tenth installment of the Trails series, itself a part of the larger Legend of Heroes series, and follows Trails of Cold Steel IV (2018). It was released in Japan for the PlayStation 4 in August 2020, with ports released for the Nintendo Switch and Windows in August 2021. An English version was released in July 2023 with an additional port for the PlayStation 5. Trails into Reverie is considered the end of the series's Crossbell and Erebonia arcs and serves as the precursor to Trails Through Daybreak.

== Gameplay ==
Trails into Reverie plays similarly to the Trails of Cold Steel tetralogy, being a traditional Japanese role-playing video game with turn-based battles. The game features a new Crossroads system where players can switch between three different story arcs, with each focusing on a different protagonist: The leader of Crossbell's Special Support Section, Lloyd Bannings, the instructor of Class VII, Rean Schwarzer, and the masked character "C". The game features over 50 playable characters.

== Plot ==
The game takes place five months after the end of the Great Twilight. Ilya Platiere, Rixia Mao and Sully Atraid of Arc-en-Ciel present a revival of their Golden Sun, Silver Moon show. This performance is displayed on video monitors all over the city, in order to distract the populace and Rufus' Personal Forces while the city is retaken by the SSS and their allies. Crossbell's Special Support Section (SSS) led by Lloyd Bannings, oust the remaining imperial forces from Crossbell and reclaim independence. Later they're preparing the city for the reindependence ceremony, but once started, it's interrupted by Rufus Albarea, the former Governor General of Crossbell and the righthand man of the deceased Chancellor Osborne who's seemingly freed from prison. He easily overpowers the SSS and forces them to retreat, he then reclaims Crossbell as his territory and reveals his intention of uniting the world under the branch of Crossbell Unified nation with him as the Supreme Leader.

At the same time in Erebonia, Rean Schwarzer and his students are having a vacation in Ymir, Rean's hometown where they are approached by Kurt's father Matteus Vander, who recruits them to find the missing Prince Olivert and his wife. Rean assembles the members of Class VII and together start looking for clues in the capital, where they cross paths with a group led by mysterious "C". They discover that C is Rufus, who denies his actions as the Supreme Leader and instructs Class VII to look for the missing prince in Nord Highlands.

Meanwhile, Rufus and his team, consisting of Swin Abel and Nadia Rayne, defectors of a secret society known as Garden, as well as Lapis Rosenberg, a sentient doll are investigating Rufus's "doppelganger" in Crossbell and the source of his power, receiving help from Duvalie the Swift and Renne Bright, defectors of Ouroboros as well as Arios Maclaine, a famous bracer of Crossbell. They discover that Lapis is the personality of a singularity named Elysium, which possesses powerful calculation abilities and can bring them to life; however, Lapis lost control of Elysium when a calculation spiraled out of control and corrupted the system, ultimately resulting in the Supreme Leader coming into existence and taking over Crossbell.

In the Nord Highlands, Class VII manage to rescue Prince Olivert but encounter an Arios doppelganger, barely fend off a rogue railway gun strike, and encounter what appears to be a Divine Knight, which begins to assimilate Rean. In the process, they manage to disable an orbal jammer and discover that Olivert's captors were targeting his communications Artifact, the Sonorous Seashell. In response, they infiltrate Crossbell and recover the Artifact, restoring communications with their allies in Crossbell. Now able to coordinate their efforts, the SSS, Thors Class VII, Rufus's team and the Liberlian bracers join to liberate Crossbell and succeed, but it is revealed that the Supreme Leader was another puppet as a weapon suddenly appears out of nowhere and threatens the world.

The heroes later assault the weapon and discover the true mastermind is an alternate version of Rean from another timeline calculated by Elysium (the normal ending of CSIV) in which Rean did not separate Ishmelga from himself and became "Ishmelga-Rean", the Awakener and pilot of the new Divine Knight, the fully reforged Great One. The unlikely existence of the Great One allows the spirits of Valimar, Ordine and El-Prado to come to their aid and Rean successfully separates his other self from Ishmelga while Lapis deactivates Elysium, wiping the Great One out of existence in the process. With his dying breath, Ishmelga sets the weapon on destroying whatever humans hate, while the others escape, Rufus remains behind and announces to the world that he is responsible for the recent incident, thus driving humanity's hate to himself and the weapon, but Lapis, Swin, Nadia, Lloyd, the SSS dog Zeit and Jusis save him before the weapon destroys itself.

Rufus survives his injuries and is free to go since the world believes he is dead, although he will not be allowed to enter Erebonia freely, as doing so would result in his arrest and execution. With no threat of reannexation, the heroes watch as Crossbell goes with the reindependence ceremony and gains a permanent freedom.

The game contains multiple side-stories, some leading up to the main story, and others foreshadowing the events of Trails Through Daybreak.

== Development and release ==
The game was announced by Nihon Falcom in December 2019 for the PlayStation 4. It was released in Japan on August 27, 2020. Ports for the Nintendo Switch and Windows were released on August 26, 2021, by Clouded Leopard Entertainment in Japan. Like the Trails of Cold Steel games, Trails into Reverie was made using the PhyreEngine game engine and was the last game by Nihon Falcom to use it. NIS America released the game in English for PlayStation 4, PlayStation 5, Windows, and Switch in North America and Europe on July 7, 2023, and on July 14 in Australasia. The English release was riddled with bugs with most Link Attacks not working, catching certain fish crashing the game, the first auto save crashing the game for some players making playing the game itself impossible for those players, inability for European players to transfer save files from PS4 versions of IV when playing on a PS5, and interactions missing from intimacy events on all consoles other than the PS4. A patch was released a week later on PC, two weeks later on PlayStation, and three weeks later on Switch to fix these issues.

== Reception ==
Reception

Aggregate scores
Aggregator	Score
Metacritic	(NS) 79/100 (PC) 82/100 (PS5) 81/100
OpenCritic	84% recommend

The Nintendo Switch, PC, and PlayStation 5 versions of The Legend of Heroes: Trails into Reverie all received generally favorable reviews from critics, according to the review aggregation website Metacritic. Fellow review aggregator OpenCritic assessed that the game received strong approval, being recommended by 84% of critics.
