= The Legend of Heroes: Trails of Cold Steel =

2013 video game

- Developer: Nihon Falcom (Note: Ported to the Nintendo Switch by Clouded Leopard Entertainment.)
- Publishers: Xseed Games: JP: Nihon Falcom (Note: Nintendo Switch version published by Clouded Leopard Entertainment in Japan.); EU: NIS America (PS3, Vita); EU: Marvelous Europe (PS4)
- Director: Takayuki Kusano
- Producer: Toshihiro Kondo
- Programmers: Nobuhiro Hioki; Toru Endo
- Writers: Hisayoshi Takeiri; Aichiro Miyata; Syuuji Nishitani
- Composers: Hayato Sonoda; Takahiro Unisuga; Saki Momiyama; Tomokatsu Hagiuda; Yukihiro Jindo
- Series: Trails
- Engine: PhyreEngine
- Platforms: PlayStation 3; PlayStation Vita; Windows; PlayStation 4; Nintendo Switch
- Release: September 26, 2013: PlayStation 3, PS Vita; JP: September 26, 2013; NA: December 22, 2015; EU: January 29, 2016; Windows; WW: August 2, 2017; PlayStation 4; JP: March 8, 2018; NA: March 26, 2019; EU: March 29, 2019; Nintendo Switch; JP: July 8, 2021
- Genre: Role-playing
- Mode: Single-player

The Legend of Heroes: Trails of Cold Steel (Note: Japanese: 英雄伝説 閃の軌跡, Hepburn: Eiyū Densetsu: Sen no Kiseki) is a 2013 role-playing video game developed by Nihon Falcom. The game is the sixth installment of the Trails series, itself a part of the larger The Legend of Heroes series, and follows Trails to Azure (2011). It was initially released in Japan for the PlayStation 3 and PlayStation Vita before being localized in English by Xseed Games in 2015.

A Windows port was also released by Xseed in 2017, which included additional English voice acting. Another port for the PlayStation 4 was released in Japan in 2018, and worldwide the following year. A port for Nintendo Switch was released in Japan and Asia in 2021. The first part of a four-part arc, the game was followed up by Trails of Cold Steel II in 2014.

== Gameplay ==
The gameplay of Trails of Cold Steel is similar to previous Trails games, being a traditional Japanese role-playing video game with turn-based battles. It adds free camera movement and fully 3D character models.

The game has a new battle system, designed for commands in fights to be selected at a faster rate. The system allows players to pair characters up with a "Link" system, which allows follow-up attacks and provides various other benefits. Links become more useful assets to the player as the story progresses and characters level up their "Link Levels" with other characters. Cold Steel maintains the "AT" (Action Time) battle system, which displays ally versus enemy turns on a bar on the screen. The Orbment system from past games has been streamlined. Trails of Cold Steel inherits the "Master Quartz" system from Trails to Azure.

Players can transfer save data between the PlayStation 3, PlayStation Vita, and PlayStation 4 versions using cross-save functionality.

== Plot ==
The game is set in the Erebonian Empire and takes place after the Trails in the Sky trilogy and concurrently with Trails from Zero and Trails to Azure.

The plot is centered around "Class VII" at Thors Military Academy in Trista, a newly formed class at the academy and the only one not segregated by social class (composing of both Erebonian nobility and commoners). The class consists of protagonist Rean Schwarzer (a commoner later adopted into a noble family), Alisa Reinford (daughter of the chairman of an engineering company), Elliot Craig (the son of a famous commander from the Imperial Army), Laura S. Arseid (the daughter of a renowned warrior and noble), Machias Regnitz (the son of the Imperial governor), Jusis Albarea (the heir of one of the four Great Houses), Emma Millstein (a commoner accepted into Thors due to her exceptional grades), Fie Claussell (former member of a jaeger group called Zephyr), Gaius Worzel from the Nord Highlands, and class instructor Sara Valestein (a member of the Bracer Guild). They are later joined by Crow Armbrust (a second year who joins Class VII after failing to graduate), and Millium Orion (a member of Imperial Army's Intelligence Division).

Throughout the school year, Class VII undergo field studies that take them to various cities and areas across Erebonia. The primary purpose is for the class to witness first-hand the reality of the Empire, consumed in a power struggle between the aristocratic Nobles that command the Provincial Army, and the working class Reformists led by Chancellor Giliath Osborne, which threatens to lead to civil war. In the process, the students increasingly come into conflict with a terrorist group later known as the Imperial Liberation Front (secretly backed by the Noble Alliance), led by the masked charismatic leader known only as "C". They are also investigating their academy's old schoolhouse, which mysteriously grows and changes its layout every month. At the bottom of the old schoolhouse, after overcoming the final trial, they discover a mech known as a Divine Knight called "Valimar".

During a speech by Osborne regarding Crossbell's recent bid for independence from Erebonia and the neighboring Republic of Calvard, he is assassinated by "C", revealed to be Crow. The assassination starts a civil war between the Noble Faction/Provincial Armies and Reformists/Imperial Army. Trista is invaded by the Provincial Army and Imperial Liberation Front. During the attack, Valimar offers to form a covenant with Rean, making him an "Awakener", one who can summon and pilot a Divine Knight, which Rean accepts. Rean uses Valimar to drive back the Provincial Army and Imperial Liberation Front, but Crow, revealed to also be an Awakener, arrives in Trista and challenges Rean with his Divine Knight, Ordine. After Rean is defeated, the rest of Class VII engages Crow, allowing Valimar to escape with Rean.

== Development and release ==
A new Trails game was in development for PlayStation 3 and PlayStation Vita since the late 2012. It was developed using the PhyreEngine game engine.

The game was first released in Japan as Sen no Kiseki on September 26, 2013, for PlayStation 3 and PlayStation Vita. In December, Falcom CEO and series producer Toshihiro Kondo said that while the player base was mostly in their 30s when the series was on PC, changing the character designs from Trails from Zero and on had an effect on targeting younger audiences, resulting in Sen no Kiseki's player base being mostly in their late teens to early 20's.

A Chinese and Korean localization was released in June 2014 with assistance by Sony Computer Entertainment Japan Asia. An English localization by Xseed Games was released on December 22, 2015, for PS3 and Vita as The Legend of Heroes: Trails of Cold Steel. It was published by Xseed in North America and in Europe by NIS America. A port for Windows was released worldwide in August 2017; this release includes additional voice acting not seen in the original release.

A remastered version for the PlayStation 4, The Legend of Heroes: Trails of Cold Steel I: Kai -Thors Military Academy 1204-, was released in Japan on March 8, 2018. It includes many features seen in the Windows release, such as support for 4K resolution and a "high speed skip" combat feature. The remastered PS4 version was released in North America and Europe in March 2019. A port for the Nintendo Switch by Clouded Leopard Entertainment was released in Japan and Asia on July 8, 2021.

== Reception ==
Reception

Aggregate score
Aggregator	Score
Metacritic	PS3: 86/100; VITA: 77/100; PC: 80/100; PS4: 80/100

Review scores
Publication	Score
Destructoid	7/10
Famitsu	34/40
Game Informer	8.5/10
Hardcore Gamer	4.5/5
RPGamer	4.5/5
PlayStation LifeStyle	9.5/10

Awards
Publication	Award
PlayStation LifeStyle Awards 2015	Editor's Choice
Game Informer's Best of 2015	Best of 2015

The Legend of Heroes: Trails of Cold Steel received "generally favorable" reviews according to review aggregator Metacritic. Famitsu gave the PS3 and PS Vita versions a score of 34/40. PlayStation LifeStyle said it is "a role-playing masterpiece with all the right stuff: Xseed's superior localization, which bypasses anime cliches in favor of real depth; an addictive set of life-sim mechanics, from bonding with the lovable cast to cooking a bevy of dishes; and a combat system that rewards customization and cooperation between party members". Hardcore Gamer said it "is hands down the best JRPG this year" and that if "this is what's in store for us with future Legend of Heroes titles, it's safe to say that the JRPG genre has a bright future ahead of it". Kimberley Wallace of Game Informer stated that, with "fun combat, interesting twists, and a cool social system, Trails of Cold Steel is one of my favorite recent RPGs". Adriaan den Ouden of RPGamer said it was his favorite RPG of 2015. Multiplayer.it said Cold Steel is "complex, deep and varied, and sports surprisingly realistic and mature storyline and setting" and an "unforgettable cast of characters". Destructoid said it "follows a lot of classic JRPG conventions" and "doesn't do a whole lot of things that haven't been done before" but concluded "the combat system still holds up, and the characters are charming enough to see the story through until the end". In a review of the English localization, RPGSite noted that there had not been English versions of the two prior titles Zero no Kiseki and Ao no Kiseki, arguing that the gap made it more difficult for players of the English version to fully grasp the narrative.

At the 2013 Japan Game Awards, Trails of Cold Steel was named among its 11 Future Division winners.

=== Sales ===
During the first week after release in 2013, the PlayStation Vita version outsold the PlayStation 3 version, placing second place in the Media Create software sales charts with 81,622 copies sold, compared to the 67,718 copies sold for the PS3 version in fourth place. The game resulted in significant profits for Falcom, with 1.9 billion yen in net sales, and 700 million yen in operating profit.
