= The Legend of Heroes: Trails Through Daybreak =

2021 video game

- Developer: Nihon Falcom
- Publishers: NIS America: JP: Nihon Falcom; PAL: Clouded Leopard Entertainment
- Director: Takayuki Kusano
- Producer: Toshihiro Kondo
- Designers: Koutaro Honda; Yoshihiro Konda
- Programmers: Yuki Hirata; Toru Endo; Nobuhiro Hioki
- Artist: Katsumi Enami
- Writers: Hisayoshi Takeiri; Yuuta Miyazaki; Syunsei Shikata
- Composers: Hayato Sonoda; Shuntaro Koguchi; Yukihiro Jindo; Mitsuo Singa
- Series: Trails
- Platforms: PlayStation 4; PlayStation 5; Windows; Nintendo Switch
- Release: PlayStation 4: JP: September 30, 2021; WW: July 5, 2024; PlayStation 5: JP: July 28, 2022; WW: July 5, 2024; Windows: CHN: July 28, 2022; JP: March 1, 2023; WW: July 5, 2024; Nintendo Switch: JP: February 15, 2024; WW: July 5, 2024
- Genre: Role-playing
- Mode: Single-player

The Legend of Heroes: Trails Through Daybreak (Note: Japanese: 英雄伝説 黎の軌跡, Hepburn: Eiyū Densetsu: Kuro no Kiseki) is a 2021 role-playing video game developed by Nihon Falcom. The game is the eleventh installment of the Trails series, itself a part of the larger The Legend of Heroes franchise, and is the first game in the Calvard story arc. It marks the second half of the Trails series and is the first to be set in the Republic of Calvard. The game follows Van Arkride, a young man working at Arkride Solutions Office as a Spriggan, a bounty hunter and problem solver for hire, and Agnès Claudel, a high school student who joins Van to find eight magical devices known as Genesis.

Trails Through Daybreak was released in Japan for the PlayStation 4 in September 2021. A port for the PlayStation 5 was released in Japan and other Asian regions in July 2022, along with a Windows port in Chinese and Korean. A Japanese Windows port was released in March 2023. An English version by NIS America, including a Nintendo Switch port, was released in July 2024. A sequel, Trails Through Daybreak II, was released in 2022.

== Gameplay ==
Trails Through Daybreak features both traditional turn-based combat with basic action combat, a first for the series.

The story follows a chapter format. In each chapter, the player spends a day in the city of Edith, where they are free to interact with characters and do side missions. When the story progresses, it sends the player to a different place where a new member joins the party. The game has no load times for entering or exiting buildings, and generally has a larger overworld than seen in previous games in the series. A first for the series, Trails Through Daybreak features an alignment system based on law, chaos, and mix of the two. While the system does not affect the main story or ending, it unlocks options that allow the player to ally with certain factions at a particular point in the game, triggering unique events and dialogues.

The game's combat may be played in one of two modes: real-time action battles similar to Falcom's Ys series and traditional turn-based combat featured in the series' past. The game encourages the player to use both modes, which can be freely switched between outside of boss fights, which are exclusively turn-based.

== Plot ==
In the year 1208, thanks to postwar reparations from the Erebonian Empire, the Republic of Calvard experiences unprecedented economic growth while continuously dealing with public unrest caused by immigration and new governmental reforms. In a corner of the city of Edith, a young man known as Van Arkride is working at Arkride Solutions Office as a Spriggan, a bounty hunter and problem solver for hire.

One day, Van is approached by Agnès Claudel, a high school student and the daughter of Calvard's new president Roy Gramheart. She asks for his help to find orbments called the Oct-Genesis, the last creation of her late great-grandfather Claude Epstein, one of the greatest scientists in history. Along the way they are joined by Mare, Van's AI; Feri Al-Fayed, a jaeger of the Kruga clan; Aaron Wei, a performer in Langport; Risette Twinings, an employee of a private military company; Quatre Salision, a pupil of Professor Hamilton who is one of Professor Epstein's disciples; Judith Lanster, a famous actress who has a secret identity as the Phantom Thief Grimcat; and Bergard Zeman (Gunther Barkhorn), Van's mentor and a knight of the Church who was presumed dead. Their search for the Oct-Genesis brings them into conflict with the terrorist group Almata led by Gerard Dantès. The Arkride Solutions Office align themselves with other factions such as the Bracers, the government, and even criminal organizations like Ouroboros and Heiyue against Almata, which itself is aided by Garden, a secret organization formed by Ellroy Harwood, the Fourth Anguis of Ouroboros who combined the remains of the D∴G cult in Crossbell with the remains of the group he formerly belonged to, the Order of the Moonlight Horse. Van also reunites with Elaine Auclair, a bracer who is his childhood friend and René Kincaid, a government secretary who is his and Elaine's childhood friend.

It is revealed that Van has become the host of one of the five demon lords known as Vagrants Diaspora when he was young (which allows him to take a monstrous form known as Grendel) and became a test subject of the D∴G cult under the supervision of Gerard Dantès who was its high priest at the time. Using this position, Gerard claimed the power for himself and escaped the cult's extermination. He then took over the leadership of Almata to spread fear and strengthen the demonic power. It is also revealed that Gerard is actually a descendant of the Eldarion family, Calvard's fallen royalty.

Van and his team face and kill Gerard, but he and other deceased members of Almata are revived by one of his subordinates named Melchior. The Spriggans face Gerard again who transforms into a demon. Van takes the demonic power back from him, killing him for good. Giving the last Oct-Genesis they found back to Agnès, Van becomes Vagrants Diaspora and imprisons himself in another plane to save humanity, but his team, with the help of his orbment's artificial intelligence Mare, reach Van's prison realm, saves him and together, defeat the demon lord.

== Development and release ==
Trails Through Daybreak marks the start of the second half of the series' narrative, and the beginning of a new story arc that continues with its sequels Trails Through Daybreak II and Trails Beyond the Horizon. It features a new proprietary game engine, known as the Falcom Developer Kit (FDK), that replaced the PhyreEngine used in the Trails of Cold Steel series. Trails Through Daybreak was released for the PlayStation 4 in Japan on September 30, 2021. A port for the PlayStation 5 was released in Japan and other Asian regions on July 28, 2022, along with a Windows port in Chinese and Korean.

A fan translation group released a spreadsheet and overlay program for the game; however, it received a cease-and-desist removal order by NIS America in August 2022 after an unofficial patch that could directly insert the English text into the game was made. NIS America later released a Japanese Windows port on March 1, 2023. Trails Through Daybreak was released worldwide in English on July 5, 2024, in addition to a Nintendo Switch version. A Japanese Switch version by Falcom was released on February 15, 2024, followed by a Chinese and Korean version by Clouded Leopard Entertainment the following month.

== Reception ==
Reception

Aggregate scores
Aggregator	Score
Metacritic	84/100
OpenCritic	88% recommend

In Japan, the PlayStation 4 version was the highest selling physical game of its release week, selling an estimated 50,100 copies. It remained on the weekly top 30 sales chart for another two weeks, reaching a total of 58,300 physical copies sold. The PlayStation 5 version debuted at the bottom of the chart, selling 2,400 copies. The English release was received well by critics, with it being cited as a good place for newcomers to the series to begin.
