= The Legend of Heroes: Trails to Azure =

2011 video game

- Developer: Nihon Falcom
- Publisher: NIS America: JP: Nihon Falcom
- Director: Toshihiro Kondo
- Producer: Masayuki Kato
- Programmers: Toru Endo; Aichiro Miyata; Katsuya Horimoto
- Artist: Katsumi Enami
- Writers: Hisayoshi Takeiri; Nobuhiro Hioki; Yoshihiro Konda
- Composers: Hayato Sonoda; Takahiro Unisuga; Saki Momiyama; Masanori Osaki
- Series: Trails
- Platforms: PlayStation Portable; Windows; PlayStation Vita; PlayStation 4; PlayStation 5; Nintendo Switch; Nintendo Switch 2
- Release: September 29, 2011: PlayStation Portable; JP: September 29, 2011; Windows; CHN: March 28, 2013; NA: March 14, 2023; EU: March 17, 2023; AU: March 24, 2023; PlayStation Vita; JP: June 12, 2014; PlayStation 4; JP: May 28, 2020; NA: March 14, 2023; EU: March 17, 2023; AU: March 24, 2023; Nintendo Switch; AS: April 22, 2021; NA: March 14, 2023; EU: March 17, 2023; AU: March 24, 2023; JP: August 31, 2023; PS5, Switch 2; WW: September 10, 2026
- Genre: Role-playing
- Mode: Single-player

The Legend of Heroes: Trails to Azure (Note: Japanese: 英雄伝説碧の軌跡, Hepburn: Eiyū Densetsu: Ao no Kiseki) is a 2011 role-playing video game developed by Nihon Falcom. The game is the fifth installment of the Trails series, itself a part of the larger The Legend of Heroes series. Trails to Azure serves as a sequel to Trails from Zero (2010), forming the second and final part of the series' Crossbell arc.

Trails to Azure released in Japan for the PlayStation Portable in 2011 with no release outside of Asia until 2023, when it was published by NIS America for Windows, PlayStation 4, and Nintendo Switch, with ports to the PlayStation 5 and Nintendo Switch 2 set for release on September 10, 2026. The English release was based upon the work of a fan translation.

== Plot ==
Trails to Azure is set a few months after the ending of Trails from Zero. The protagonists: Lloyd, Elie, Tio and Randy, the police's Special Support Section (SSS), and their adoptive daughter KeA, are joined by new recruits – the Army sergeant major Noel Seeker and the former gang leader Wazy Hemisphere.

Upon reuniting, the SSS investigates the Red Constellation, an infamous mercenary corps which has set up a base in Crossbell. Randy reveals that the head of the Red Constellation, Sigmund, is his uncle, who wants Randy to follow in his father's footsteps as the corps' leader. The SSS is asked to provide security at a trade conference between the nations of western Zemuria. The conference is disrupted by terrorists targeting the leaders of Erebonia and Calvard, who escape from the building only to be killed by the Red Constellation and members of a Calvardian crime syndicate. The two nations use the incident to push for sanctions on Crossbell, but Crossbell's mayor, Dieter Crois, says it proves that Crossbell needs to be more autonomous. He begins planning a referendum for Crossbellan independence.

The SSS are sent to investigate the appearance of the secret society Ouroboros in the city, but members of the society defeat them and disappear. They also clash with the Red Constellation, who launches an attack on the city. Eventually, the referendum takes place. When pro-independence voters win, Crois declares Crossbell an independent state with himself as president, triggering hostility from Erebonia and Calvard. Later that day, the SSS discovers that the government has kidnapped KeA. While confronting the government's forces, they learn that KeA is an artificial human created centuries prior to embody the Sept-Terrion of Mirage, a powerful artifact gifted to humanity by the Goddess in ancient times which could control causality. It is also revealed that Crois, a descendant of the ancient alchemists that created KeA, is at the head of a conspiracy to use her power to make Crossbell a global superpower, along with his daughter Mariabell, Ouroboros, and the Red Constellation, whose attack was orchestrated by Crois to help win the referendum. KeA awakens her abilities and uses them to power weapons that annihilate the invading Erebonian and Calvardian forces, while the SSS is arrested and imprisoned.

A month later, Lloyd breaks out of prison and reunites the SSS, planning to rescue KeA. They infiltrate the city and defeat President Crois, only for his allies to abandon him. Mariabell uses magic and KeA's power to grow a massive Azure Tree on the outskirts of the city, initiating the final stage of the conspiracy's plan. The SSS use an airship to ascend the Tree and fight their way inward. Along the way, Randy defeats Sigmund and denies his destiny as a mercenary. At the top, Mariabell explains that even before her awakening, KeA could alter reality, and reveals that the SSS was originally killed by Joachim Guenter at the end of Trails from Zero before KeA intervened. She also states that KeA warped their emotions to make them love her. Agitated, KeA loses control and transforms into a monstrous avatar of the Sept-Terrion, which the party defeats. Afterward, KeA attempts to erase herself from existence, but Lloyd explains that their love for her was real, which convinces her to erase her power and remain with her family.

In the aftermath, the Azure Tree collapses and Crois' conspirators are arrested, except for Mariabell and Sigmund's daughter Shirley, who are recruited to Ouroboros. However, Crossbell is annexed by the Erebonian Empire, which leads into the events of the Trails of Cold Steel arc.

== Release ==
Ao no Kiseki was released in Japan for the PlayStation Portable on September 29, 2011. It was later ported to Windows for release in China on March 28, 2013. It was also released for the PlayStation Vita in Japan on June 12, 2014, as Ao no Kiseki: Evolution. This version features improved visuals and more voice acting. The Evolution version received a remaster for the PlayStation 4, releasing in Japan under the title Ao no Kiseki Kai on May 28, 2020. It was also released for the Nintendo Switch in China and South Korea by Clouded Leopard Entertainment on April 22, 2021.

Trails to Azure and its predecessor, Trails from Zero, were not localized in English by the time of the Japanese release of Trails of Cold Steel in 2013. Falcom subsequently approached Xseed Games, who had previously localized Trails in the Sky, and requested that a localization of Trails of Cold Steel be prioritized instead, resulting in Trails from Zero and Trails to Azure being skipped. An English fan translation was released in 2018, with another one by a team known as the "Geofront" released in May 2021. Geofront's release would serve as the foundation for an official English version by NIS America for the Nintendo Switch, PlayStation 4 and Windows, released in March 2023 in North America, Europe and Australasia. That version was also released in Japan for the Switch by Falcom on August 31, 2023.

== Reception ==
Reception

Aggregate score
Aggregator	Score
Metacritic	(PC) 86/100 (PS4) 81/100 (NS) 86/100

Review scores
Publication	Score
Destructoid	8.5/10
Eurogamer	Recommended
Hardcore Gamer	4/5
Push Square	9/10
RPGamer	4/5

Trails to Azure received "generally favorable" reviews according to review aggregator website Metacritic.

The game was listed as one of the best upcoming games of 2011 at that year's Tokyo Game Show. Along with Trails from Zero, Comic Book Resources highlighted the game's "persistent overarching storyline, immersive and detailed settings, masterful character development [and] unique battle system". They noted that, despite the lack of an official localization at the time, the plot and characters were integral to understanding later games in the series.
