= The Legend of Heroes: Trails in the Sky =

2004 video game

The Legend of Heroes: Trails in the Sky FC
- Developer: Nihon Falcom
- Publishers: JP: Nihon Falcom; WW: Xseed Games; EU: Ghostlight (PSP)
- Director: Toshihiro Kondo
- Producer: Masayuki Kato
- Programmers: Hideyuki Yamashita; Noriyuki Chiyoda; Takayuki Kusano; Tōru Endō
- Artists: Haccan; You Shiina
- Writers: Hisayoshi Takeiri; Yoshihiro Konda; Shūji Nishitani; Homare Karusawa
- Composers: Hayato Sonoda; Wataru Ishibashi
- Series: Trails
- Platforms: Windows; PlayStation Portable; FOMA; PlayStation 3; PlayStation Vita; Android; iOS; Nintendo Switch; Nintendo Switch 2; PlayStation 5
- Release: June 24, 2004: Windows; JP: June 24, 2004; WW: July 29, 2014 PlayStation Portable; JP: September 28, 2006; NA: March 29, 2011; EU: November 4, 2011 FOMA; JP: December 24, 2008 PlayStation 3; JP: December 13, 2012 PlayStation Vita; JP: June 11, 2015 Android, iOS; JP: January 19, 2016 Nintendo Switch, Nintendo Switch 2, PlayStation 5; JP: September 17, 2026
- Genre: Role-playing
- Mode: Single-player

The Legend of Heroes: Trails in the Sky, (Note: Japanese: 英雄伝説VI 空の軌跡, Hepburn: Eiyū Densetsu VI: Sora no Kiseki) also known as Trails in the Sky FC, is a 2004 role-playing video game developed by Nihon Falcom. The game is the first in the Trails series, itself a part of the larger The Legend of Heroes series. Trails in the Sky was first released in Japan for Windows and was later ported to the PlayStation Portable in 2006.

North American video game publisher Xseed Games acquired the rights from Falcom, but did not release it until 2011 due to the game's large amount of text necessary to translate and localize. A PlayStation 3 port was released in Japan in 2012, followed by a worldwide Windows release in 2014. A PlayStation Vita version was released in 2015 in Japan. A sequel, Trails in the Sky SC, was released in 2006. A remake, Trails in the Sky 1st Chapter, was released on the Nintendo Switch, Nintendo Switch 2, PlayStation 5, and Windows in September 2025.

== Gameplay ==
The two main modes of gameplay involve exploring the field map (top) and engaging in combat (bottom).

In Trails in the Sky, the player controls a cast of characters, embarking on quests to progress the story. There are two different types of maps when navigating the overworld, field maps and town maps. In field maps, enemies roam around and a battle ensues if the player comes into contact with one. In town maps, the player can visit various shops to purchase items, replenish health at an inn and, for the major cities, take on and report quests to the local guild. Quests can be a variety of tasks for the player, ranging from defeating monsters in the field map to delivering items and finding lost cats in town. In addition, the player can interact with numerous non-playable characters (NPCs). A unique aspect in Trails in the Sky is that each NPC's dialogue changes as the story progresses, allowing players to follow their accompanying side stories throughout the game. The game features 8 playable characters, who apart from the protagonists Estelle and Joshua, rotate in and out of the party while playing the main story. The story itself is split into five different portions, with a prologue followed by four chapters.

Combat takes place on a grid and is turn-based. The character's turn order is determined by a tracker called the AT Bar. During the character's turn, the player can move or make an attack. In addition to the normal attack, each character also has three other methods available for action: Arts, Crafts, and S-Crafts. Arts are magic spells characters can use to attack opponents or support teammates but must take an additional turn to cast. Crafts are character-specific abilities that are similar to Arts but can be used in the same turn, but they utilize a special gauge called "Craft Points" (CP) for the cost to perform. S-Crafts are powered-up Crafts that can be performed once a character has over 100CP but completely depletes the CP gauge upon using it. Further extending S-Crafts are S-Breaks which allows characters to immediately perform an S-Craft regardless of when their turn order is. An additional aspect of combat is AT Bonuses which grant bonus effects at certain turns throughout the battle, visible on the AT Bar. If the player loses a battle, the game is over. The player is then allowed to continuously retry the battle and subsequently lower the difficulty of the battle for each retry. Earlier versions of the game included two difficulty settings, Normal and Hard, while later versions introduced a third difficulty known as Nightmare.

== Synopsis ==
The game follows protagonists Estelle Bright and her adopted brother Joshua, who journey through the country of Liberl to train to become senior Bracers, members of a non-governmental multinational organization that acts to keep the peace and protect civilians. During their journey, they uncover a plot by Colonel Alan Richard, head of the country's intelligence division, to overthrow the monarchy and obtain an artifact known as the Aureole, one of seven treasures said to be gifted to mankind by the goddess Aidios. Estelle, Joshua, and their allies confront Richard and foil the coup.

During the celebratory party after the incident is resolved, Joshua confronts Professor Alba, an archaeologist the party encountered throughout their quest, and accuses him of orchestrating the coup. Alba reveals that he is actually Georg Weissmann, a high-ranking member of a secret society called Ouroboros, and that he was the one who manipulated Richard into pursuing the Aureole. Weissman also states that Joshua is a former member of the society and restores his memories of his service with them. In fear of endangering Estelle, Joshua decides to leave in order to take on Ouroboros independently. After confessing his feelings to Estelle, he drugs her to prevent her from following him before departing.

== Release ==
Trails in the Sky was initially released for Windows on June 24, 2004, in Japan. The game was later ported to the PlayStation Portable and released in Japan on October 28, 2006. It was then released via FOMA by Taito on December 24, 2008. The PSP version was later released by Xseed Games in 2011 in North America on March 29, and in Europe on November 4. A port for Windows was released worldwide on July 29, 2014. A PlayStation 3 port, titled Trails in the Sky FC Kai HD Edition, was released in Japan on December 13, 2012. iOS and Android versions were released by Broadmedia in Japan on January 19, 2016.

A remaster, The Legend of Heroes: Trails in the Sky FC Evolution, was developed by Paon DP and published by Kadokawa Games in Japan for the PlayStation Vita on June 11, 2015. Evolution updates the user interface and incorporates new features such as voice acting, redesigned character portraits, and a new animated opening cutscene.

=== Localization ===
The game was localized into English by Xseed Games, who had acquired the rights to bring the Trails in the Sky trilogy to North America in May 2010. The length of the script for Trails in the Sky FC, which contains approximately 1.5 million Japanese characters, presented a challenge for the team's editors. Jessica Chavez, the game's lead editor, spent nine months working on the script. Chavez stated that she would frequently work over 11–12 hours for six days a week. In 2013, Xseed planned a Windows version of Trails in the Sky to be released in early 2014, but coding issues forced the release date to be pushed back to July. Xseed localization programmer Sara Leen stated much of the code needed to be rewritten from scratch because of technical differences between the PlayStation Portable and Windows versions; these changes frequently introduced new software bugs, further complicating matters.

== Reception ==
Reception

Aggregate score
Aggregator	Score
Metacritic	PC: 85/100; PSP: 79/100

Review scores
Publication	Score
Famitsu	32/40
Game Informer	8.25/10
GamePro	4/5
GamesMaster	82%
GameSpot	8/10
GamesRadar+	4.5/5
Hardcore Gamer	4.5/5
IGN	8/10
Pocket Gamer	9/10
RPGFan	90%

Trails in the Sky received "generally favorable" reviews according to review aggregator Metacritic. Neilie Johnson of IGN gave it a positive review, stating that, though "First Chapter is not the most original ever made, like any good JRPG it offers amusing writing, dynamic combat, interesting tasks, an absorbing narrative, and hours upon hours of gameplay" and concluded that "while the game's 50/50 balance between combat and story may not be to everyone's taste, its charm and overall entertainment value make it well worth the investment". Hardcore Gamer praised the "rock-solid character writing", noting every character has "their own history, ambitions, and social connections", every non-player character (NPC) "has their own name and motivations and interpersonal relationships with other NPCs", and the influence of Hayao Miyazaki's classic anime film Castle in the Sky on the cast and steampunk setting. They also praised the open-ended story, quest design, and combat system, and for having "one of the most complete and enthralling worlds ever rendered", concluding it to be "one of the finest JRPGs in the history of the genre".

Despite the series's popularity in Japan, Trails in the Sky FC sold poorly in North America and Europe upon its initial release for the PSP, but USGamer's Kat Bailey described its later PlayStation Vita availability and PC port as a useful revenue stream with little overhead for niche publisher Xseed Games. It was named the best RPG of 2011 in several Editor's Pick lists by RPGFan and among the best games of the year by Wired.

== Trails in the Sky 1st Chapter ==
Trails in the Sky 1st Chapter
- Developer: Nihon Falcom
- Publishers: JP: Nihon Falcom; NA: GungHo; EU: Clear River Games
- Director: Takayuki Kusano
- Producer: Toshihiro Kondo
- Designer: Yoshihiro Konda
- Programmers: Yuuki Hirata; Shingo Maekawa; Syun Kubota; Masatoshi Kurihara; Taiga Furuki
- Writers: Hisayoshi Takeiri; Syunsei Shikata; Hiroyuki Yaguchi; Yuuta Miyazaki; Sumire Abe; Azuki Goto
- Composers: Hayato Sonoda; Shuntaro Koguchi; Takahiro Unisuga; Yukihiro Jindo
- Series: Trails
- Platforms: Nintendo Switch; Nintendo Switch 2; PlayStation 5; Windows
- Release: September 19, 2025
- Genre: Role-playing
- Mode: Single-player

Trails in the Sky 1st Chapter, a remake using the Trails Through Daybreak engine known as the Falcom Developer Kit (FDK) as well with implementing its action & turn-based hybrid combat, was released worldwide for the Nintendo Switch, Nintendo Switch 2, PlayStation 5, and Windows on September 19, 2025. Falcom had previously suggested a remake of Trails in the Sky was under consideration before it was revealed in a Nintendo Direct presentation in August 2024. The game was published in Japan by Falcom, in North America by GungHo Online Entertainment, and in Europe by Clear River Games. A sequel, Trails in the Sky 2nd Chapter, was released on September 17, 2026.
