= List of role-playing video games: 1986 to 1987 =

This is a comprehensive index of commercial role-playing video games (RPGs), sorted chronologically by year. Information regarding release platform, release type, RPG subgenre, game setting, developers, publishers, and country of origin is provided where available. The table can be sorted by clicking on the small boxes next to the column headings.

This list includes all RPG subgenres, including MMORPGs, Action RPGs and Tactical RPGs. This list does not include MUDs and Roguelikes by default, unless they have an additional RPG subgenre. For standalone lists on these subgenres, see List of MUDs and List of roguelikes

== Legend ==
Video game platforms
AMI	Amiga	APPGS	Term not found	APPII	Apple II
Arcade	Arcade video game	ATR	Atari 8-bit computers	ATRST	Atari ST, Atari Falcon
C64	Commodore 64	C128	Commodore 128	DOS	PC DOS / MS-DOS, Windows 3.X
FDS	Famicom Disk System	FM7	FM-7	GEN	Genesis / Mega Drive
MAC	Classic Mac OS, 2001 and before	MSX	MSX	MSX2	MSX2
NES	Nintendo Entertainment System / Famicom	PC88	PC-8800 series	PC98	PC-9800 series
SG1K	SG-1000	SMS	Master System	X1	Sharp X1

Types of releases
Compilation	A compilation, anthology or collection of several titles, usually (but not always) belonging to the same series
Early access	A game launched in early access is unfinished and thus might contain bugs and glitches or have some of the content missing
Episodic	An episodic video game that is released in batches over a period of time
Expansion	A large-scale DLC to an already existing game that adds new story, areas and additions and/or changes to the game's mechanics
Full release	A full release of a game that launched in early access first
Limited	A special release (often called "Limited" or "Collector's Edition") with bonus collector's material. Often provided to people who pre-order a game
Port	The game first appeared on a different platform and a port was made. The game is like the original, with few or no differences
Remake	The game is an enhanced remake of an original, made using a new engine and/or assets and thus containing completely new sound, graphics and possibly changes to the story and/or gameplay
Remaster	The game is a remaster of an original, released on the same or different platform, with (usually minor) changes to graphics, sound and/or gameplay
Rerelease	The game was re-released on the same platform with no or only minor changes

Video game genres
Action RPG	Action role-playing game	Dungeon crawl	Dungeon crawl	JRPG	Japanese-style role-playing game
MMORPG	Massively multiplayer online RPG	Monster tamer	Monster-taming game	MUD	Multi-user dungeon
Real-time	Real-time game	Roguelike	Roguelike, Roguelite	Sandbox	Sandbox game
Soulslike	Soulslike	Tactical RPG	Tactical role-playing game	Turn-based	Turn-based game

== List ==
Year	Title	Developer	Publisher	Setting	Platform	Subgenre	Series/Notes	COO
1986 (NA/UK)	Alternate Reality: The City	Paradise; Datasoft	Datasoft; U.S. Gold	Sci-Fi	APPII (Port), C64 (Port), MAC (Port), ATRST (Port)		Series debuts.	US
1986 (NA/UK)	Bards Tale, The	Interplay	EA	Fantasy	AMI (Port)		Bard's Tale	US
1986 (NA)	Bard's Tale II, The: The Destiny Knight	Interplay	EA	Fantasy	C64		Bard's Tale	US
1986 (JP); 1987 (NA)	Deadly Towers (NA); Mashou (JP) 魔鐘 (JP)	Irem	Broderbund; Irem	Fantasy	NES	Action RPG		JP
1986 (JP)	Deep Dungeon: Madō Senki (JP) ディープダンジョン 魔洞戦記 (JP)	HummingBird	DOG	Fantasy	FDS	Dungeon crawl		JP
1986 (JP)	Dragon Slayer Jr: Romancia ロマンシア	Nihon Falcom	Nihon Falcom	Fantasy	PC88, PC98, MSX, MSX2, X1	Action adventure	Sequel to Dragon Slayer II: Xanadu.	JP
1986 (JP); 1989 (NA)	Dragon Warrior (NA); Dragon Quest (JP) ドラゴンクエスト (JP)	Chunsoft	Enix; Nintendo	Fantasy	NES, PC98, MSX	JRPG	Series debuts.	JP
1986 (JP)	Ganso Saiyuuki: Super Monkey Dai Bouken (JP) 元祖西遊記 スーパーモンキー大冒険 (JP)		VAP	Fantasy	NES	Action RPG	Based on the novel Journey to the West	JP
1986 (JP)	Haja no Fuuin (JP) 覇邪の封印 (JP)	Kogado	ASCII	Fantasy	FM7, PC88	JRPG		JP
1986 (JP); 1989 (NA)	Hydlide (NA); Hydlide Special (JP) ハイドライドスペシャル (JP)	T&E	FCI, Inc.. Tohiba EMI	Fantasy	NES (Remake)	Action RPG	Series debuts.	JP
1986 (JP)	Hydlide II: Shine of Darkness (JP) ハイドライド II (JP)	T&E	T&E	Fantasy	FM7 (Port), MSX (Port)	Action RPG		JP
1986 (FR)	Mandragore (FR)	Infogrames	Infogrames	Fantasy	MSX	Computer-style RPG		FR
1986 (NA)	Might & Magic: Book I	New World	New World	Fantasy	APPII		Series debuts.	US
1986 (NA)	Phantasie	Logical Design	SSI	Fantasy	ATRST (Port)		Series debuts.	US
1986 (NA)	Phantasie II	SSI	SSI	Fantasy	APPII			US
1986 (NA)	Alter Ego	Activision	Activision	Modern	APPII, C64, DOS, MAC			US
1986 (NA)	Phantasie II	Logical Design	SSI	Fantasy	C64 (Port), ATRST (Port)			US
1986 (NA)	Shard of Spring	SSI; Digital Illusions	SSI	Fantasy	APPII, C64, DOS		Followed by Demon's Winter.	US
1986 (NA)	Starflight	Binary Systems	EA	Sci-Fi	DOS		A rare example of a sci-fi CRPG and the spiritual ancestor to such games as Star Control 2 and Space Rangers.	US
1986 (JP)	Super Rambo Special (JP) スーパーランボースペシャル (JP)	Pack-In-Video	Pack-In-Video	Modern	MSX2	Action RPG		JP
1986 (NA)	Temple of Apshai Trilogy	Westwood	Epyx	Fantasy	AMI (Port), ATRST (Port)			US
1986 (NA)	Ultima I: The First Age of Darkness	Origin	Origin	Fantasy	APPII (Remake)		Series debuts.	US
1986 (NA)	Ultima I: The First Age of Darkness	Origin	Origin	Fantasy	C64 (Port)		Series debuts.	US
1986 (JP/NA)	Ultima III: Exodus	Origin	Origin; StarCraft	Fantasy	AMI (Port), MAC (Port), ATRST (Port), FM7 (Port), PC88 (Port), PC98 (Port)	Computer-style RPG	Pioneered many innovations that would become standard on many CRPGs, both Western and Eastern, that followed.	US
1986 (NA)	Ultima IV: Quest of the Avatar	Origin	Origin	Fantasy	ATR (Port)		The first major CRPG to move from "hack and slash" gameplay to a "virtuous" story-driven approach.	US
1986 (JP)	Valkyrie no Bōken: Toki no Kagi Densetsu (JP) ワルキューレの冒険 時の鍵伝説 (JP)	Namco	Namco	Fantasy	NES	Action RPG		JP
1986 (JP); 1989 (NA)	WiBArm (NA); WiBArm (JP) ウィバーン (JP)	Arsys Software (JP)	Arsys Software (JP); Broderbund (NA)	Sci-Fi	PC88, DOS (Port)	Action RPG		JP
1986 (NA/UK)	Wizard's Crown	SSI	SSI	Fantasy	APPII (Port), ATR (Port), C64 (Port)	Tactical RPG		US
1987 (NA)	Wizardry IV: The Return of Werdna	Sir-Tech	Sir-Tech	Fantasy	APPII, DOS	Dungeon crawl		US
1987 (NA)	2400 A.D.	Origin	Origin	Sci-Fi	APPII			US
1987 (NA)	Alternate Reality: The Dungeon	Datasoft	Datasoft	Sci-Fi	APPII, ATR, C64			US
1987 (JP)	Artelius (JP) アルテリオス (JP)	Nichibutsu	Nichibutsu	Fantasy	NES	Action RPG		JP
1987 (JP/NA)	Bard's Tale, The (NA) バーズテイル (JP)	Interplay	EA	Fantasy	APPGS (Port), DOS (Port), ATRST (Port), PC88 (Port), PC98 (Port)	Dungeon crawl		US
1987 (NA)	Bard's Tale II, The: The Destiny Knight	Interplay	EA	Fantasy	APPII (Port)	Dungeon crawl		US
1987 (NA)	Beyond Zork: The Coconut of Quendor	Infocom	Infocom	Fantasy	AMI, APPII, APPGS, C128, DOS, MAC, ATRST	Adventure game/RPG hybrid		US
1987 (JP)	Black Onyx, The (JP) ザ・ブラックオニキス (JP)	Bullet-Proof	Sega	Fantasy	SG1K	Dungeon crawl	The original release is often considered one of Japan's first RPGs.	JP
1987 (JP)	Cleopatra no Mahou (JP) クレオパトラの魔宝 (JP)	Square	Square		FDS			JP
1987 (NA)	Deathlord	EA	EA	Fantasy	APPII, C64			US
1987 (JP)	Digital Devil Story: Megami Tensei (JP) デジタル・デビル物語 女神転生 (JP)	Atlus	Namco	Fantasy	NES	Dungeon crawl	Series debuts.	JP
1987 (JP)	Dragon Scroll (NA) ドラゴンスクロール 甦りし魔竜 (JA)	Konami	Konami	Fantasy	NES	Action RPG		JP
1987 (JP)	Dragon Slayer II: Xanadu (JP) ザナドゥ (JP)	Nihon Falcom	Sony	Fantasy	MSX, MSX2	Action RPG		JP
1987 (JP); 1990 (NA)	Dragon Warrior II (NA); Dragon Quest II Akuryo no Kamigami (JP) ドラゴンクエストII 悪霊の神々 (JP)	Chunsoft	Enix	Fantasy	NES	JRPG		JP
1987 (NA); 1988 (UK)	Dungeon Master	FTL	FTL	Fantasy	ATRST (Port)			US
1987 (JP)	Esper Dream (JP) エスパードリーム (JP)	Konami	Konami	Fantasy	FDS	Action RPG	Series debuts.	JP
1987 (NA)	Eternal Dagger, The	SSI	SSI	Fantasy	APPII, ATR	Tactical RPG	Sequel to Wizard's Crown.	US
1987 (NA)	The Faery Tale Adventure	MicroIllusions	MicroIllusions	Fantasy	DOS, AMI, C64		Series debuts.	US
1987 (JP); 1989 (NA); 1990 (EU)	Faxanadu (INT) ファザナドゥ (JP)	Falcom	Hudson Soft; Nintendo	Fantasy	NES	Action RPG	Spin-off of the Dragon Slayer series.	JP
1987 (JP); 1990 (NA)	Final Fantasy (JP/NA) ファイナルファンタジー (JP)	Square	Square; Nintendo	Fantasy	NES	JRPG	Series debuts.	JP
1987 (JP)	Getsu Fūma Den (JP) 月風魔伝 (JP)	Konami	Konami	Fantasy	NES	Action RPG		JP
1987 (JP)	Ginga no Sannin (JP) 銀河の三人 (JP)	Pax Softnica	Nintendo	Sci-fi	NES (Port)		aka The Earth Fighter Rayieza	JP
1987 (JP)	Golvellius (JP) 魔王ゴルベリアス (JP)	Compile	Compile	Fantasy	MSX	Action RPG		JP
1987 (JP)	Hydlide 3: The Space Memories (JP) ハイドライド 3 (JP)	T&E	T&E	Fantasy	MSX, MSX2	Action RPG		JP
1987 (JP)	Kalin no Tsurugi (JP); Sword of Kalin (JP) カリーンの剣 (JP)	XTALSOFT	DOG	Fantasy	FDS	Action RPG		JP
1987 (JP)	King Kong 2: Yomigaeru Densetsu (JP) キングコング 2 (JP)	Konami	Konami		MSX2	Action RPG		JP
1987 (JP); 1989 (NA)	Legacy of the Wizard (JP); Dragon Slayer IV: Drasle Family (JP) ドラゴンスレイヤーIVドラスレファミリー (JP)	Nihon Falcom	Nihon Falcom; Namco; Broderbund	Fantasy	MSX, NES	Action RPG	Sequel to Dragon Slayer Jr: Romancia.	JP
1987 (JP); 1989 (NA)	Magic of Scheherazade, The (NA); Arabian Dream Scheherazade (JP) アラビアン・ドリーム シェラザード (JP)	Culture Brain	Culture Brain	Fantasy	NES	Action RPG		JP
1987 (NA)	Might & Magic: Book I	New World	New World	Fantasy	APPII (Rerel)		Series debuts.	US
1987 (NA)	Might & Magic: Book I	New World	New World	Fantasy	C64 (Port), DOS (Port), MAC (Port)		Series debuts.	US
1987 (JP)	Minelvaton Saga: Ragon no Fukkatsu (JP) ミネルバトンサーガ ラゴンの復活 (JP)	Taito	Taito		NES	Action RPG		JP
1987 (JP); 1988 (NA/PAL)	Miracle Warriors: Seal of the Dark Lord (NA/PAL); Haja no Fuin (JP) 覇邪の封印 (JP)	Kogado	Kogado; Sega; ASCII	Fantasy	MSX, MSX2, NES, SMS	JRPG		JP
1987 (JP)	Outlanders (JP) アウトランダーズ (JP)	Micronics	VMI, Inc.	Sci-Fi	NES	Action RPG		JP
1987 (NA)	Phantasie	Logical Design	SSI	Fantasy	ATR (Port), DOS (Port)			US
1987 (NA)	Phantasie	Andromeda	SSI	Fantasy	AMI (Port)			US
1987 (NA)	Phantasie II	Logical Design	SSI	Fantasy	ATR (Port)			US
1987 (NA)	Phantasie III: Wrath of Nikademus	SSI	SSI	Fantasy	APPII			US
1987 (NA)	Phantasie III: Wrath of Nikademus	Westwood	SSI	Fantasy	AMI (Port), C64 (Port), ATRST (Port)			US
1987 (JP); 1988 (NA/EU)	Phantasy Star (INT) ファンタシースター (JP)	RD4 (Sega)	Sega	Sci-Fi	SMS	JRPG	Series debuts.	JP
1987 (JP)	Return of Ishtar, The (JP); Ishitā no Fukkatsu (JP) イシターの復活 (JP)	Game Studio	Namco	Fantasy	Arcade	Action RPG	Sequel to Tower of Druaga	JP
1987 (JP)	Shiryou Sensen: War of the Dead (JP) 死霊戦線 (JP)		Victor Music Industries	Fantasy	MSX2	Action RPG	Ancestor of the survival horror subgenre.	JP
1987 (JP)	Sorcerian (JP) ソーサリアン (JP)	Nihon Falcom	Nihon Falcom	Fantasy	PC88	Action RPG	Fifth game in the Dragon Slayer series.	JP
1988 (JP)	Star Cruiser (JP) スタークルーザー (JP)	Arsys Software (JP)	Arsys Software (JP)	Sci-Fi	PC88, GEN (Port)	Action RPG; FPS/RPG		JP
1987 (NA)	Tower of Myraglen (NA)	PBI Software	PBI Software	Fantasy	APPGS			US
1987 (JP)	Tōjin Makyō-den Hercules no Eikō (JP) 闘人魔境伝 ヘラクレスの栄光 (JP)	Data East	Data East	Fantasy	NES	JRPG	Series debuts.	JP
1987 (NA)	Ultima I: The First Age of Darkness	Origin	Origin	Fantasy	DOS (Port)		Series debuts.	US
1987 (JP)	Ultima II: The Revenge of the Enchantress (JP) ウルティマII (JP)	Origin	Pony Canyon	Fantasy	MSX2	Computer-style RPG		US
1987 (JP); 1988 (NA)	Ultima III: Exodus (NA); Ultima: Kyoufu no Exodus (JP) ウルティマ ～恐怖のエクソダス～ (JP)	Origin	Origin; FCI; Pony Canyon	Fantasy	NES, MSX2	Computer-style RPG		US
1987 (NA/JP)	Ultima IV: Quest of the Avatar (NA) ウルティマIV (JP)	Origin	Origin; Pony Canyon	Fantasy	ATRST (Port), MSX2	Computer-style RPG	The first major CRPG to move from "hack and slash" gameplay to a "virtuous" story-driven approach.	US
1987 (NA)	Wizard's Crown	SSI	SSI	Fantasy	ATRST (Port)	Tactical RPG		US
1987 (JP); 1990 (NA)	Wizardry: Proving Grounds of the Mad Overlord (JP/NA)	Sir-Tech Software; Sting; Game	Sir-Tech; ASCII; Nexoft	Fantasy	C64 (Port), NES, MSX2	Dungeon crawl	Series debuts.	US
1987 (NA)	Wizardry IV: The Return of Werdna	Sir-Tech	Sir-Tech	Fantasy	APPII	Dungeon crawl		US
1987 (NA)	Wizardry Trilogy	Sir-Tech	Sir-Tech	Fantasy; Sci-Fi	APPII (Comp), C64 (Comp)		Compilation of the first three Wizardry games.	US
1987 (JP)	Woody Poko (JP) うっでいぽこ (JP)	DB Soft	DB Soft	Fantasy	NES			US
1987 (JP)	Ys I: Ancient Ys Vanished (JP) イースI (JP)	Nihon Falcom	Nihon Falcom	Fantasy	MSX2	Action RPG	First game in the Ys series	JP
1987 (JP)	Yūshi no Monshō: Deep Dungeon (JP) 勇士の紋章 ディープダンジョン (JP)	HummingBird	DOG	Fantasy	FDS	Dungeon crawl	Second game in the Deep Dungeon series	JP
1987 (JP); 1988 (US/PAL)	Zelda II: The Adventure of Link (INT) ゼルダの伝説 (パート) 2 リンクの冒険 (JP)	Nintendo	Nintendo	Fantasy	FDS, NES	Action RPG	Sequel to action-adventure game The Legend of Zelda.	JP
1987 (JP); 1990 (NA)	Zeliard (JP/NA) ゼリアード (JP)	Game Arts	Game Arts; Sierra	Fantasy	DOS, PC88	Action RPG / Platform hybrid		JP
