= Faxanadu =

1987 video game

- North American box art
- Developer: Hudson Soft
- Publishers: JP: Hudson Soft; NA/EU: Nintendo
- Designer: Hitoshi Okuno
- Composer: Jun Chikuma
- Series: Dragon Slayer
- Platform: Nintendo Entertainment System
- Release: JP: November 16, 1987; NA: August 1989; EU: December 1990
- Genre: Action role-playing
- Mode: Single-player

Faxanadu (Note: Japanese: ファザナドゥ, Hepburn: Fazanadu) is an action role-playing platform video game for the Nintendo Entertainment System. The name was licensed by computer game developer Falcom and was developed and released in Japan by Hudson Soft in 1987. Nintendo released the game in the United States and Europe as a first-party title under license from Hudson Soft.

Faxanadu is a spin-off or side-story of Xanadu, which is the second installment of Falcom's long-running RPG series, Dragon Slayer. The title Faxanadu is a portmanteau formed from the names Famicom and Xanadu. The game uses side-scrolling and platforming gameplay, while employing role-playing elements with an expansive story and medieval setting. Hudson originally licensed Xanadu after seeing its commercial success on the computer platforms, desiring to port it to the home console. However, because of technical difficulties, rushed production, and the lack of assistance from Falcom, the original plan was aborted in favor of creating a new game unrelated to Xanadu. Faxanadu was designed by Hudson programmer Hitoshi Okuno, and the soundtrack was composed by Jun Chikuma.

Faxanadu has been compared to The Legend of Zelda series, particularly Zelda II: The Adventure of Link, sharing the side-scrolling gameplay. Upon release, its presentation and gameplay were well-received, but its perceived lack of similarities to the original Xanadu divided Japanese critics.

== Gameplay ==
Gameplay screenshot

Faxanadu is a side scrolling action role playing game (action RPG). The player guides the hero through a screen-by-screen series of fields, towns, and dungeons. The hero can walk, jump, and climb ladders that are all typical characteristics of a platform game. Along the way, he may also purchase usable items with gold, equip and use bladed weapons against enemies, wear armor, and cast magic projectiles. In addition, he can access information regarding the game's events by speaking with townsfolk or by consulting other sources.

The limits of physical damage the hero can sustain from enemies is tracked by a life bar, and the magical power he can exert is tracked by a magic bar. These are listed on the top of the screen along with total experience, gold amount, time (for items with a timed duration), and the currently held item.

When the hero defeats an enemy, it usually leaves behind gold or life-giving bread. The hero also gains a set amount of experience. Experience points help increase the hero's rank. Occasionally, an enemy will also drop an item; some activate specific effects when touched, while others may be stored for later use.

The game utilizes a password system. Passwords, or "mantras" as they are known in the game, can be obtained from church-dwelling Gurus. Gurus also bestow ranks to the hero when he meets certain experience totals; these determine the amounts of experience and gold a player will possess upon resuming a game via password.

== Plot ==
The player-controlled protagonist of Faxanadu is a wanderer who returns home. While the Japanese version allows the player to choose the name of this wanderer, in all other versions he is named "Nello". The game begins when he approaches Eolis, his hometown, after an absence to find it in disrepair and virtually abandoned. Worse still, the town is under attack by Dwarves. The Elven king explains that the Elves' fountain water, their life source, has been stopped and all other remaining water has been poisoned and provides the protagonist with 1500 gold, the game's currency, to prepare for his journey to uncover the cause.

As the story unfolds, it is revealed that Elves and Dwarves lived in harmony among the World Tree until The Evil One emerged from a fallen meteorite. The Evil One then transformed the Dwarves into monsters against their will and made them hostile towards the Elves. The Dwarf King, Grieve, swallowed his magical sword before he was transformed, hiding it in his own body to prevent The Evil One from acquiring it. It is only with this sword that The Evil One can be destroyed.

His journey takes him to four overworld areas: the tree's buttress, the inside of the trunk, the tree's branches and finally the Dwarves' mountain stronghold.

== Development ==
Faxanadu was developed by Hudson Soft. It is a spin-off of Nihon Falcom's computer game Xanadu (1985), part of the Dragon Slayer role-playing video game series. In a testimony by Masayuki Kato, the founder of Nihon Falcom, the game originated from a personal request by Yuji Kudo, the found of Hudson, who gave Kato a kibori kuma and asked him to grant Hudson the rights for the console port of Xanadu, Falcom's most successful game at the time. Namco also contacted Kato for the rights, but they were already sold off to Hudson. The title is a portmanteau of "fa-" and Xanadu, with the former derived from its releasing platform Family Computer, the Japanese name of the Nintendo Entertainment System (NES). Kato stated the title change was due to trademark issues.

The development was headed by Hudson programmer Hitoshi Okuno, who faced trouble as the porting started. Okuno thought Xanadu was too huge and complicated to be converted for the console without making considerable cuts to the content. Furthermore, Hudson had not received any source code or design documents from Falcom. It was also impossible for Okuno to play the computer game for reference, as it was too difficult and confusing. The production was on a tight schedule with only two months reserved for game development, so Okuno decided to ignore the original plan and create an action RPG unrelated to Xanadu.

The soundtrack was composed by Jun Chikuma with assistance from sound programmer Toshiaki Takimoto. Chikuma was given full freedom for the music from general directions to sound details. Due to having to work within the limitations of the NES sound processor, Chikuma used her background in jazz technique to create melodic movements and express chord progression.

== Release ==
Hudson originally announced Faxanadu in Japan with the release window of September 1987. It got delayed and ultimately released on November 16, 1987. Faxanadu was the last of the three video games published under the Marucho Series product line, preceded by RoboWarrior and Momotarō Densetsu.

Nintendo published the international versions, advertised in its booth during the 1989 Winter Consumer Electronics Show. It was released in North America in August 1989 and Europe in December 1990. The North American version received a box art depicting a shield reminiscent of The Legend of Zelda (1986), and a tagline reading, "Daggers and wingboots, mantras and monsters await you." These elements led to the assumption that the game was marketed toward fans of the Zelda games. Faxanadu was one of the first Dragon Slayer titles to be released in the United States, with Legacy of the Wizard and Sorcerian also making their way to the country.

Faxanadu was re-released on the Wii's Virtual Console in Japan on October 5, 2010, Europe on November 26, 2010, and North America on February 21, 2011.

== Reception ==
=== Contemporary ===
Contemporary reviews

Review scores
Publication	Score
Famitsu	7, 7, 7, 8 (out of 10)
Total!	88%
VideoGames & Computer Entertainment	7/10
Famicom Hisshoubon	3/5

On release, Japanese critics noted Faxanadu bears little resemblance to the original computer Xanadu. Four reviewers from Famicom Tsūshin all discussed the drastic differences between Faxanadu and Xanadu. One reviewer called Faxanadu an action RPG in style of Zelda II: The Adventure of Link and preferred Xanadu, while another preferred Faxanadu because he found Xanadu too gloomy by comparison. A reviewer from Famicom Hisshoubon said Faxanadu is polished as an action game, but it would have been better if it tried harder to replicate the original Xanadu.

The graphical and audio presentation were well-received. VideoGames & Computer Entertainment said the graphics vary "from average to gorgeous", and described the huge hidden castles and the corridors into the World Tree as "highly detailed and colorful". The music was also praised. Famicom Tsūshin's two reviewers said its huge text size and the use of both hiragana and kanji made it easier to read the dialogues. One reviewer from Famicom Hisshoubon stated Faxanadu has great graphics although it does not look like the original Xanadu. In a more negative review, Game Player's regarded the graphics as "cluttered".

The gameplay was likewise met with praises. A reviewer from Famicom Tsūshin stated it has adequate difficulty for its puzzles. Another highlighted talking to town people as a positive, but found the game too easy. One reviewer from Famicom Hisshoubon remarked Faxanadu's "rushing RPG" style was unique among contemporary games that emphasized elegance and smartness. VideoGames & Computer Entertainment said Faxanadu is more simplistic and less difficult than Zelda II, but it is still a well-rounded adventure thanks to puzzles and arcade-style levels.

Total! positively compared Faxanadu to The Legend of Zelda, calling it "great to look at, even better to play". By constrast, Game Player's claimed Faxanadu falls short of the standard set by Ultima, Dragon Warrior, Shadowgate, and the Zelda games.

In the November 1989 issue of Nintendo Power, Faxanadu debuted on the magazine's "Top 30" list at number six.

=== Retrospective ===
Retrospective reviews

Review scores
Publication	Score
IGN	8.5/10
Nintendo Life	8/10

Faxanadu continued to receive critical acclaim since its release. IGN reviewed the game in 2011, after its Wii virtual console release, and called it a hidden gem. IGN went on to call it a better action RPG than Zelda II: The Adventure of Link and Castlevania II: Simon's Quest.

Marcel van Duyn of Nintendo Life gave the game an 8 out of 10, saying it is a surprisingly fun game and an absolutely essential purchase for those who like RPGs, but he criticized the password system for western audiences, and was grateful the Virtual Console release eliminates that feature. Retro Gamer listed the game as the 16th best game for the NES, saying it is a "forgotten gem" of the system's library. IGN listed the game as the 36th best NES game, calling it one of the best and least-known Nintendo-published adventures.

Several publications nominated Faxanadu as a title they wanted to come back as a re-release.

In 2018, Kato said Faxanadu was a commercial success upon release, and estimated approximately a million copies were sold internationally. However, he argued it should not have been given a Xanadu title due to the creative liberty Hudson had taken, even though he thought Faxanadu was a good game on its own merits.
