= Xanadu (video game) =

1985 video game

- MSX cover art
- Developer: Nihon Falcom
- Publisher: Nihon Falcom
- Designer: Yoshio Kiya
- Composers: Toshiya Takahashi (PC‑8801); Yuzo Koshiro (Scenario II); Takahito Abe (Scenario II)
- Series: Dragon Slayer
- Platform: PC-8801: X1, PC-8001, PC-9801, MSX2, MSX, FM-7, FM-77, Sega Saturn, Windows
- Release: October 27, 1985: PC-8801; JP: October 27, 1985; JP: 1986 (Scenario II) X1; JP: November 3, 1985 PC-8001; JP: November 21, 1985; JP: 1986 (Scenario II) PC-9801; JP: November 21, 1985 FM-7, FM-77; JP: January 7, 1986 MSX2; JP: April 1987 MSX; JP: November 6, 1987 Windows; JP: December 4, 1998; JP: August 30, 2002
- Genre: Action role-playing
- Mode: Single-player

Xanadu (ザナドゥ, Zanadu), also known as Xanadu: Dragon Slayer II, is an action role-playing game developed by Nihon Falcom and released in 1985 for the PC-8801, X1, PC-8001, PC-9801, FM-7 and MSX computers. Enhanced remakes were later released for the Sega Saturn, PC-9801 and Windows platforms. It is the second entry in the Dragon Slayer series, preceded by Dragon Slayer and followed by Dragon Slayer Jr: Romancia, which, as most games in the Dragon Slayer series, have little relation with each other.

Xanadu set a sales record for computer games in Japan, with over 400,000 copies sold there in 1985. It was one of the foundations of the role-playing genre, particularly the action role-playing subgenre, featuring real-time action combat combined with full-fledged character statistics, innovative gameplay systems such as the Karma meter and individual experience for equipped items, and platform game elements combined with the dungeon crawl gameplay of its predecessor. It also had towns to explore and introduced equipment that change the player character's visible appearance, food that is consumed slowly over time and is essential for keeping the player character alive, and magic used to attack enemies from a distance.

The following year saw the release of Xanadu Scenario II, an early example of an expansion pack. The game spawned the Xanadu series, a spin-off from the Dragon Slayer franchise.

== Gameplay ==
Dragon Slayer laid the foundations for the action role-playing game genre, influencing future series like Ys. Xanadu was an early real-time action RPG with full-fledged character statistics, and it introduced several innovative gameplay mechanics, such as the Karma morality system, individual experience for equipped items, a heavy emphasis on puzzle-solving, equipment that changes the player character's visible appearance, food that is consumed slowly over time and is essential for keeping the player character alive, magic that can be used to attack enemies from a distance, and training facilities to improve various statistics. It also introduced a platformer-style side-scrolling view, including the ability to jump. The side-scrolling view is used during exploration and switches to the overhead view of its predecessor during battle, while certain rooms also use an overhead view. This gameplay is credited as a precursor to the development of the metroidvania genre.

The game begins with the player directly in control of the protagonist, with little to no introduction. To progress, one must speak with the king, who gives the player the bare essentials and a small amount of cash to train. After selecting which attributes to raise, the player must navigate of the city and into the vast underground complex. Finding this exit is the first of many puzzles the player will encounter, though the game is not a puzzle game but a role-playing video game with puzzle game and adventure game elements.

The protagonist can move left and right, climb down ladders, jump, cast equipped spells, enter doors, or use equipped items. Similar to Falcom's own later Ys series, damage is done by walking directly into the enemy; however, unlike with Ys, in Xanadu it doesn't matter which part of the target's body the player character runs into.

The main view in Xanadu is a side-scrolling platformer view, though it is more in line with Sorcerian than a typical platformer such as Super Mario Bros. When engaging in a battle or entering a building, the view is changed to a top-down perspective. Each "layer" or stratum has its own complex network of buildings, caves and tunnels.

To level up, the player must visit temples, where a minister will grant a level up to the protagonist provided the player has enough experience points. Otherwise, the minister will let the player know how much is needed to go up a level. There are two types of levels: fighting and magic. Fighting experience is raised through combat, and magic though spell use. The two systems go hand in hand and are used at the same time. Each enemy killed is either good or bad, even though all enemies will attack the player character. If the player kills too many good enemies, the Karma statistic will rise, at which point the temples will refuse to level up the player. This can be remedied by drinking a black poison bottle; these cannot be carried nor bought, and must be found within dungeons, and will remove half the protagonist's hit points.

All equippable items, such as swords and armor, have their own experience levels. This is raised simply by using the item; for example, swords by attacking, armor by being hit, magic by casting the spell, and so on. In this sense, a highly developed dagger will be more effective than a brand new longsword. A highly developed sword will be far more useful than a maxed out dagger, so it is vital to upgrade equipment.

Xanadu has a limited number of enemies in each area, to deter powerleveling. This requires the player to think ahead about how he handles the enemies, how to get the most experience out of them, and to keep Karma from getting too high. This is a factor that must be juggled with weapon experience; if the player defeats all enemies using a dagger, then upgrades to a sword and proceeds to fight the area's boss, the player will be at a disadvantage and should have either kept the highly developed dagger, or bought the sword early on so as to level it up with the finite number of encounters in the area. Every area generally has at least one boss, although it is not always required to fight them.

Enemies will drop various items, but most commonly will drop money or food. Money is used for upgrading equipment and buying items. The protagonist slowly eats his supply of food as time passes in the game. This slowly heals hit points as well. If food runs out, hit points begin dropping at a rapid pace until more food is found or bought, or the protagonist dies.

In addition to purchasing them, items can be found in chests and in dungeon areas, or by entering a secret code name at the character creation area at the outset.

The game autosaves right before a boss fight and, in some versions, after leaving a building. The player can manually save, which costs 100 gold. The Sega Saturn remake did away with this by adding a Save command in the status menu.

== Film ==
A Xanadu OVA was released in 1988 in conjunction with the MSX version of the game and a manga, titled Xanadu: The Legend of Dragon Slayer. The plot was expanded and altered, with the main character now having a name, Fieg (フィーグ), and several new cast members. The new plot elements included several science fiction themes. For example, Fieg is a 21st-century soldier from the near future who is dropped into Xanadu after a bloody ambush.

A soundtrack to the film was released on record, cassette, and compact disc shortly thereafter.

The manga follows the plot of the film, and was drawn by Tsuzuki Kazuhiko (都築和彦), who also did work on Falcom's Ys and Sorcerian titles. It was republished as a 17 part serial webcomic by Falcom for the release of Revival Xanadu on the Falcom website, with accompanying music and an English translation.

== Development ==
In its original PC-8801 release, Xanadu features music composed by Toshiya Takahashi. To promote the release of the game, Japanese heavy metal band Anthem released an LP with two image songs, titled "XANADU".

The MSX versions of the game, which were released in 1987, have a different score.

Xanadu Scenario II, an expansion pack, features a much larger set of songs. The soundtrack was composed by Takahito Abe and Yuzo Koshiro, who would compose the music for many of Falcom's later titles. Koshiro's compositions for the opening theme and several dungeons were taken from the demo tape he had first sent to Falcom at the age of 18. Revival Xanadu and Revival Xanadu II Remix, two loose remakes made by Falcom in the 1990s, feature their own unique soundtracks as well, composed by Falcom's sound team members at the time.

Aside from Xanadu Next and Legend of Xanadu, no Xanadu titles have received a full, independent original soundtrack on compact disc. However, a soundtrack was released for both Xanadu and Xanadu Scenario II on a 12" vinyl record album; it is titled Xanadu Anthem. Selections from Xanadu's music can be heard in various Falcom albums. In 1987, "All Over Xanadu" was released; it features arranged versions of Xanadu and Scenario II's soundtrack played by a rock band combined with a live orchestra and synthesizers. The main theme of the Xanadu franchise, "La Valse Pour Xanadu", has been featured in the PC-88 and PC-98 versions of Xanadu and remixed into several audio tracks in Xanadu Next.

== Reception ==
Xanadu was a pioneer in the game industry, and received critical praise from Japanese gaming magazines and a large fan base. As of 2005, according to Falcom, its 1985 sales record of over 400,000 copies sold in Japan has yet to be broken by any role-playing PC game released in that country. However, Tokihiro Naito of T&E Soft has said that the first Hydlide (1984), an action-RPG like Xanadu, sold one-million copies across all computer formats when combining the sales - matching the Famicom version's sales of also one million copies in Japan.

French magazine Joypad reviewed the PC Engine version and gave it a 97% score.

== Re-releases and expansions ==
Xanadu is the only title Falcom has given a complete commemorative re-release in its original 1980s packaging.

Origin Systems founder and Ultima series creator Richard Garriott flew into Tokyo to have a meeting with Nihon Falcom about having Origin release Xanadu in the US, as well as having Falcom help with releasing a port of Ultima IV: Quest of the Avatar in Japan. Xanadu contained artwork directly lifted from the manuals of the role-playing game Ultima III: Exodus. During the presentation of the game, several digitized pictures from the manual of Ultima III appeared in various shops in the game. Upon seeing this, Garriott and Origin ended the meeting and decided to sue Falcom; the lawsuit was settled out of court and the artwork in the game was changed to what appears now.

Xanadu received the following expansions and re-releases:

- Xanadu Scenario II: An expansion pack released in 1986 and requiring the player to still have the original Xanadu disk. After creating a new custom Xanadu Scenario II disk, the player needs to insert the original Xanadu disk, create a character as done in the original Xanadu, and then insert the Scenario II disk when prompted. The expansion pack features a new soundtrack, a complex shopping/trading system, more maps, and new encounters with bosses. The game is non-linear, allowing the 11 levels to be explored in any order.
- Revival Xanadu: A PC-9801 remake produced by Falcom. Features a high-resolution graphical upgrade while still maintaining the feel of the original, with upgraded music as well. An "Easy Mode" was released in conjunction with Revival Xanadu II Remix later.
- Revival Xanadu II Remix: A PC-9801 semi-remake of Scenario II, though it has a completely different soundtrack and new maps.
- Falcom Classics: A Sega Saturn compilation, featuring remade versions of Ys, Dragon Slayer, and Xanadu along with emulated copies of the original versions. Many things were altered, including an easier-to-understand "Saturn Mode" and a graphic style very similar to Revival Xanadu with a larger color palette.
- Revival Xanadu (Memorial Games): A port of Revival Xanadu to Windows 95/Windows 98 by developer Unbalance. The music was recorded as non-looping WAV files. The faster-tempo battle songs are sped up to a higher pitch instead of a swifter tempo. The graphics are overly saturated compared to the PC-9801 version.
- Xanadu Complete Reprint Edition: A commemorative reprint of the 1985 original version, down to the soft plastic case and manual, aside from the game being on CD-ROM instead of diskette. It was released for Windows CD-ROM using Project EGG's emulator system.

== Legacy ==
The influence of Xanadu has been felt in many games developed by Falcom, and other development houses which have copied the look and feel. Ys featured a similar but quicker and more complex "bump" system for combat used in Ys I, II and IV, while some of the later Dragon Slayer games Romancia, Dragon Slayer IV and Sorcerian all had similar side-scrolling viewpoints. This bump system did not start with Xanadu, but with its predecessor, the original Dragon Slayer. Several smaller companies copied the "bump" system, mostly in obscure PC-8801 titles.

The game's influence also extended beyond action RPGs, with the way the game reworked the entire game system considered an influence on Final Fantasy, which would do the same for each of its installments, as its developer Square was previously the publisher for the MSX version of the original Dragon Slayer. Xanadu is also like Zelda II: The Adventure of Link, due to being an "RPG turned on its side" that allowed players to run, jump, collect, and explore.

The game spawned the Xanadu series. It has a large set of follow-ups, despite itself being technically a sequel to Dragon Slayer. Beside Faxanadu, these include the action role-playing games The Legend of Xanadu (風の伝説ザナドゥ, Kaze no Densetsu Xanadu) and its sequel The Legend of Xanadu II, released in 1994 and 1995 respectively for the PC Engine CD, as well as Xanadu Next, released in 2005 for the Nokia N-Gage and Microsoft Windows, Tokyo Xanadu, released in 2015 for the PlayStation Vita and re-released in 2016 as an enhanced version titled Tokyo Xanadu eX+ for the PlayStation 4, Microsoft Windows, and Nintendo Switch, and Kyoto Xanadu, released in 2026 for the Nintendo Switch, Nintendo Switch 2, PlayStation 5, and Microsoft Windows.
