= Dragon Slayer (video game) =

1984 video game

- Developer: Nihon Falcom
- Publishers: JP: Nihon Falcom; JP: Square (MSX); JP: Epoch (SCV/GB)
- Designer: Yoshio Kiya
- Series: Dragon Slayer
- Platforms: PC-8801, FM-7, PC-9801, X1, MSX, Super Cassette Vision, Game Boy, Sega Saturn
- Release: September 10, 1984: PC-8801; JP: September 10, 1984 PC-9801, FM-7; JP: October 18, 1984 X1; JP: December 12, 1984 MSX; JP: July 15, 1985 Super Cassette Vision; JP: 1986 Game Boy; JP: August 12, 1990 Saturn Falcom Classics; JP: November 6, 1997
- Genre: Action role-playing
- Mode: Single-player

Dragon Slayer (Note: Japanese: ドラゴンスレイヤー, Hepburn: Doragon Sureiyā) is an action role-playing game developed by Nihon Falcom and designed by Yoshio Kiya. It was originally released in 1984 for the PC-8801, PC-9801, X1 and FM-7, and became a major success in Japan.

It was followed by an MSX port published by Square in 1985 (making it one of the first titles to be published by Square), a Super Cassette Vision by Epoch in 1986 and a Game Boy port by the same company in 1990. A version for PC-6001mkII was in development but was never released. A remake of Dragon Slayer is included in the Falcom Classics collection for the Sega Saturn.

Dragon Slayer began the Dragon Slayer series, a banner which encompasses a number of popular Falcom titles, such as Dragon Slayer II: Xanadu, Sorcerian, and Legacy of the Wizard. It also includes Dragon Slayer: The Legend of Heroes, which would later spawn over a dozen entries across multiple subseries.

== Gameplay ==
Dragon Slayer is an early example of the action role-playing game genre, which it laid the foundations for. Building on the prototypical action role-playing elements of Panorama Toh (1983), created by Yoshio Kiya and Nihon Falcom, as well as Namco's The Tower of Druaga (1984), Dragon Slayer is often considered the first Japanese action role-playing game. In contrast to earlier turn-based roguelikes, Dragon Slayer was a dungeon crawl role-playing game that was entirely real-time with action-oriented combat, combining arcade style action mechanics with traditional role-playing mechanics.

Dragon Slayer featured an in-game map to help with the dungeon-crawling, required item management due to the inventory being limited to one item at a time, and featured item-based puzzles similar to The Legend of Zelda. Dragon Slayer's overhead action-RPG formula was used in many later games. Along with its competitor, Hydlide, Dragon Slayer laid the foundations for the action RPG genre, including franchises such as Ys and The Legend of Zelda.
