= Tokyo Xanadu =

2015 video game

- Developer: Nihon Falcom
- Publisher: Aksys Games: JP: Nihon Falcom
- Director: Takayuki Kusano
- Producer: Toshihiro Kondo
- Programmers: Toru Endo; Nobuhiro Hioki
- Writers: Hisayoshi Takeiri; Yoshihiro Konda; Syunsei Shikata
- Composers: Hayato Sonoda; Takahiro Unisuga
- Platforms: Tokyo Xanadu; PlayStation Vita; Tokyo Xanadu eX+; PlayStation 4; Windows; Nintendo Switch
- Release: September 30, 2015: PlayStation Vita; JP: September 30, 2015; WW: June 30, 2017; PlayStation 4; JP: September 8, 2016; WW: December 8, 2017; Windows; WW: December 8, 2017; Switch; JP: June 29, 2023; WW: July 25, 2024
- Genre: Action role-playing
- Mode: Single-player

Tokyo Xanadu (Note: Japanese: 東亰ザナドゥ, Hepburn: Tōkyō Zanadu) is a 2015 action role-playing game developed by Nihon Falcom. The game was developed out of Nihon Falcom's desire to create a game of a different type and setting than their other role-playing game franchises, The Legend of Heroes and Ys. The game was first released in Japan for the PlayStation Vita in September 2015, and worldwide in June 2017.

An enhanced version of the game, Tokyo Xanadu eX+, was released in Japan for the PlayStation 4 in September 2016, and worldwide in December 2017, in addition to a Windows version. A port for the Nintendo Switch was released in Japan in June 2023 and was released worldwide in July 2024. A sequel, Kyoto Xanadu, was released on the Nintendo Switch, Nintendo Switch 2, PlayStation 5, and Windows on July 16, 2026.

== Gameplay ==
Tokyo Xanadu is an action role-playing game that features gameplay similar to the Persona series by Atlus, as well as Falcom's own Ys and Trails franchises.

== Plot ==
In an alternate reality, Tokyo suffered a devastating earthquake in 2005, which took the city a decade to recover from. The story revolves around Kou Tokisaka, a high school student living in Morimiya in 2015. One night, while returning from work, Kou notices his classmate Asuka Hiiragi involved with some dangerous individuals. Concerned for her safety, Kou follows them into a back alley, only to be sucked into a vortex that transports him to a nightmarish realm known as Eclipse.

Asuka, who is a member of Nemesis, a group dedicated to closing the Eclipse vortexes, explains the situation to Kou. They discover other wielders at their academy who possess the ability to fight the inhabitants of Eclipse called Greeds. Sora Ikushima, a martial artist; Yuuki Shinomiya, a genius; Shio Takahata, a former street gang leader; and Mitsuki Hokuto, a student council member and heir to the Hokuto group, join their cause. During a weekend vacation, they learn that Eclipse started spreading after the Great War II and caused the devastating earthquake known as the Tokyo Twilight Disaster.

The group also encounters Rem, a girl from Eclipse known as the Child of Eclipse. To mask their mission, they form a school club called Xanadu Research Club (X.R.C). They recruit Rion Kugayama, a member of a famous idol group, and their English teacher, Gorou Saeki, who is part of the Japan-Self Defense Force. Together, they face various Eclipse incidents and prevent another Twilight Disaster, but they are eventually separated when the city is engulfed by Eclipse.

During this event, they discover that Jun Kohinata, Kou's classmate and friend, is a Seal Knight belonging to the church and tasked with fighting Eclipse. After regrouping, the X.R.C members and their allies plan to assault the source of Eclipse. To their surprise, they find Shiori Kurashiki, Kou's childhood friend, as the source. Shiori explains that she died during the disaster but was brought back to life by the mythical Greed called the Twilight Apostle. Influenced by the Apostle, Shiori aimed to engulf the world in Eclipse to change the fact of her death, but the X.R.C members defeat her, and she passes away after bidding a tearful farewell to her friends.

Afterwards, the town returns to normal, and everyone's memories of Eclipse and Shiori are erased, except for the wielders. Asuka asks Kou to accompany her to her home in Brick Alley. In the normal ending, they encounter a girl resembling Shiori, and the two of them go to the cafe where Asuka stays. In the true ending, they hear Shiori's voice and are guided by Rem to Shiori's home. There, they find an Eclipse gate and, after retrieving the necessary keys, they confront the Nine-tailed Fox. They defeat the Fox and retrieve the real Shiori's spirit, leading to an emotional reunion. The X.R.C members and their allies then enjoy the Summer Festival.

The enhanced version of the game includes side stories taking place between the main story chapters and an After Story following the true ending. The side stories involve all X.R.C members (minus Kou), Jun Kohinata, and Gorou Saeki investigating a peculiar form of Eclipse. In the After Story, the X.R.C members, along with Kou's old friend Ryouta Ibuki, are trapped in an Eclipse identical to Morimiya by a child wearing a fox mask, who is revealed to be a younger version of Kou—the Twilight Apostle. The group fights and defeats him, and they return to the real world.

After the final encounter, Kou asks Rem about the cause of the Twilight Disaster and the origin of the Twilight Apostle, but she only confirms that it was meant to happen. She mentions that there will be more choices to be made in the future, and she will be there to observe. The X.R.C members and their allies vow to prepare themselves for future battles, and the story concludes with the start of the autumn festival and everyone enjoying themselves.

== Development ==
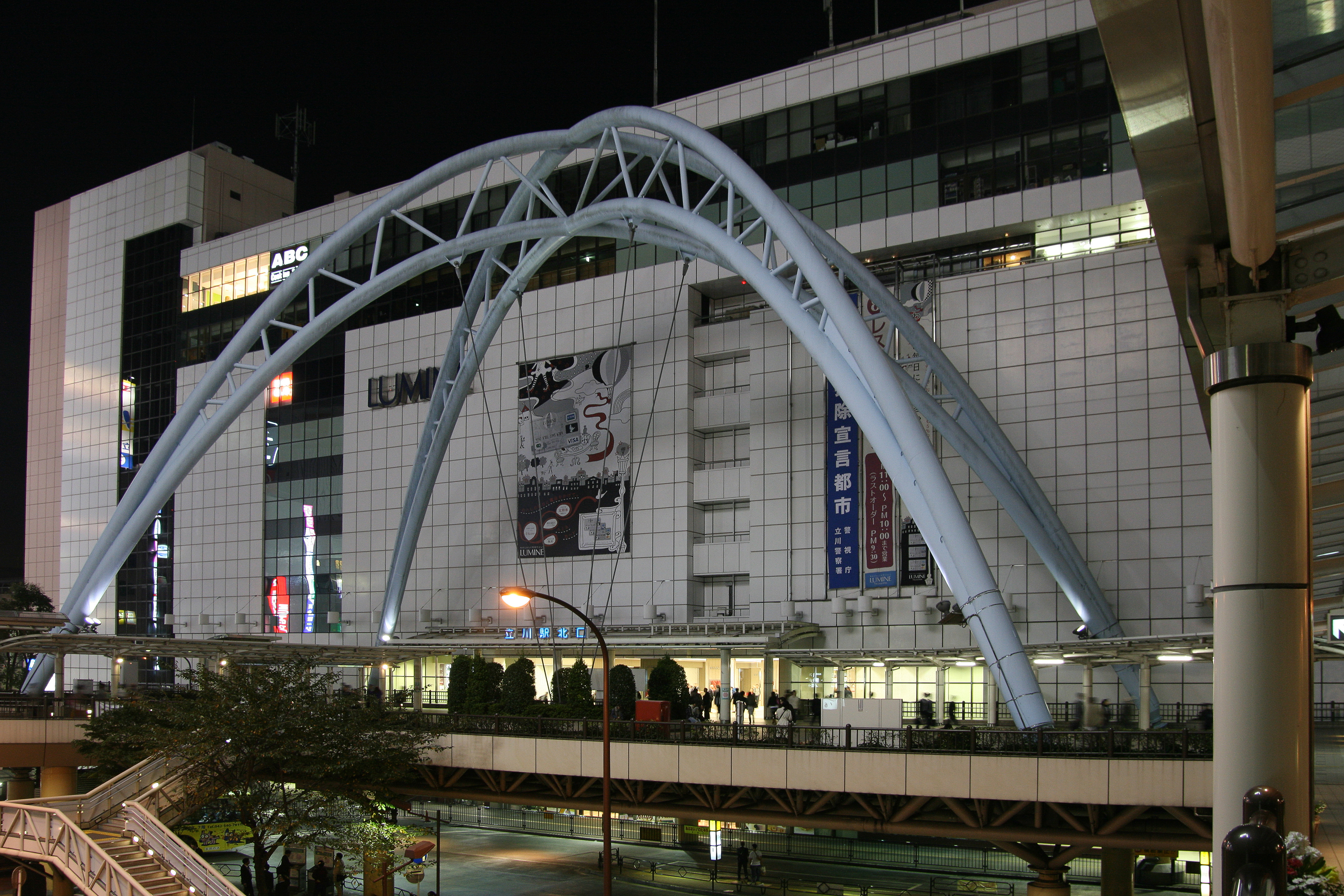
The developers took inspiration from real-world locations within Tokyo, such as the game's station plaza being modeled after the north exit of Tachikawa Station.

Nihon Falcom announced the game in December 2014. The company referred to the game as an "urban myth action RPG". They also emphasized that they wanted to create a game with a different feel than their other role-playing game franchises, such as the Ys and Trails series. While being based on the Xanadu series, which includes Xanadu (1985) and Xanadu Next (2005), Falcom set out to create a game with a different feel than their other fantasy-based role-playing game franchises, with the game taking place in a fictional district of modern-day Tokyo called Morimiya City, incorporating the use of elements not seen in their other series, such as smartphones. Morimiya was based on actual locations near Nihon Falcom's head offices in Tachikawa. For example, the Morimiya Station Plaza, with its red arch monument, closely resembles the north exit of Tachikawa Station, which has a similar-looking blue arch monument. Falcom held promotional activities at various real-world locations in Tachikawa, including a Tokyo Xanadu-themed menu at the cafe in Books Orion, an actual Japanese bookstore chain with a location in Tachikawa that appears in-game.

The game was released for the PlayStation Vita in Japan on September 30, 2015. An English version of the game was not announced for almost a year after its initial Japanese release, leaving the game's fate in the West uncertain at the time. Journalists had considered it as a likely candidate for game localization by Xseed Games, due to their close relationship with Falcom from localizing entries in their Ys and Trails games. Other journalists mistook the Xanadu related trademark leaked in January 2015 as a sign of it being translated by XSeed, though this was actually in reference to Xanadu Next.

An enhanced version of the game for the PlayStation 4, Tokyo Xanadu eX+, was released in Japan on September 8, 2016. The PS4 version contains improved graphical fidelity and an improved frame rate, as well as additional story content in the form of extra side-stories and post-game content. Aksys Games got publishing rights for localizing the Vita version of the game in English, which was released on June 30, 2017. Additionally, they contracted British games publisher Ghostlight to help port eX+ to Windows, where it was released on December 8. A Nintendo Switch port of eX+ was released on June 29, 2023 in Japan, featuring a high-speed mode and all previously released downloadable content. An English release of the Switch version was released on July 25, 2024. This release features a new English localization.

== Reception ==
Reception

Aggregate score
Aggregator	Score
Metacritic	Vita: 74/100; PS4: 75/100

Review score
Publication	Score
Famitsu	Vita: 32/40; PS4: 33/40

Famitsu gave the game a review score of 32/40. The game sold a total of 88,879 retail copies within its first week of release in Japan, topping the software sales charts for that particular week, with over 112,000 being sold within three weeks.
