= Romancia =

1986 video game

- Developer(s): Nihon Falcom; Compile (FC)
- Publisher(s): Nihon Falcom; Tokyo Shoseki (FC)
- Composer(s): Takahito Abe; Yuzo Koshiro; Masatomo Miyamoto
- Series: Dragon Slayer
- Platform(s): PC-8801, PC-9801, X1, MSX, MSX2, Famicom, Windows
- Release: PC-8801/9801/MSX/X1: JP: 1986; Famicom: JP: October 30, 1987; Windows: JP: 1999
- Genre(s): Action-adventure
- Mode(s): Single-player

Romancia (ロマンシア), also known as Dragon Slayer Jr., is an action-adventure game developed by Nihon Falcom. It is the third installment in the Dragon Slayer series, preceded by Xanadu and followed by Dragon Slayer IV.

Romancia is a simpler and brightly colored game in comparison to the other Dragon Slayer titles, hence the name "Dragon Slayer Jr."

== Story ==
The game begins with Prince Fan Freddy (ファン・フレディ) outside the castle. As in Xanadu, Fan can speak with the king for some free equipment. The goal is to rescue Princess Selina (セリナ) within 30 minutes.

Princess Selina is the princess of the Kingdom of Romancia. She becomes a prisoner in the Kingdom of Azorba.

== Gameplay ==
Romancia is an action role-playing game.

Movement is controlled with the arrow keys, and attacking is done with the action key. Unlike Xanadu, there are almost no statistics, and zero customization. The game consists largely of two screens with a few small sub-areas. The player has only thirty minutes to complete the game, further illustrating the light and accessible nature of the title versus the oppressive underground complexes of Xanadu.

If the player can't make progress in time they will have to start all over again.

In the MSX / MSX2 version, there is a mode in which the players can play Princess Serina as the main character with a hidden command.

There is a weapon called the Dragon Slayer sword which can be found in the game.

== Development ==
Romancia is part of the Dragon Slayer series, that also includes Legacy of the Wizard, Xanadu, and Sorcerian. Yuzo Koshiro contributed tracks to the game.

== Release ==
The first release was in 1986 for the PC-8801, PC-9801, MSX, and Sharp X1 computers. A later Famicom version was published by Tokyo Shoseki and developed by Compile.

An enhanced remake was released for Windows in 1999 by Unbalance.

In 2014, the PC-88 version was released along with Sorcerian for the retro game distribution service EGG.

== Reception ==
Upon release, four reviewers from Famitsu gave it a score of 19/40.

Romancia has become notable for being cute but highly difficult. Subsequent reviewers complained about the lack of direction in the game given to the player and trial and error approach. There is no save function and the player may not be aware they have made a mistake. Starting over multiple times is required to advance in the game.
