= Lord Monarch =

1991 video game

- Super Famicom cover art
- Developers: Nihon Falcom; AIM (SNES)
- Publisher: Epoch Co., Ltd.
- Series: Dragon Slayer
- Platforms: PC-9801, FM Towns, Super Famicom, Mega Drive, Windows, PlayStation
- Release: March 1991: PC-9801; JP: March 1991 FM Towns; JP: November 1991 Super Famicom; JP: October 9, 1992 Mega Drive; JP: June 24, 1994 PlayStation; JP: December 23, 1998
- Genre: Real-time strategy wargame
- Modes: Single-player, multiplayer

Lord Monarch (ロードモナーク, Rōdo Monāku) is a real-time strategy war game by Nihon Falcom. The game is considered to be part of the Dragon Slayer series. It was originally released in 1991 for the NEC PC-9801, ported 1992 to the Super Famicom and 1994 to the Mega Drive. In 1997, it was remade for Windows as Lord Monarch Online and released for free in both Japanese, and for the first time, English.

== Gameplay ==
=== Super Famicom version ===
The Super Famicom version is similar to the Sega Mega Drive version, except there are more themes in addition to the medieval Europe theme. There is a futuristic theme with robots, a fast food theme with French fries and soft drinks attacking health food, a Three Kingdoms era theme, and a fairy-tale theme. The game is automatically paused until someone presses the Start button, so there is unlimited time for making alliances in the Super Famicom version—until the start button is pressed. This mode gives the player the advantage unlike the Sega Mega Drive version because the player may take time to choose a strategically advantageous ally.

The Super Famicom version of Lord Monarch was one of the few games to support the Super Famicom mouse.

A later version of the game was broadcast exclusively for Japanese markets via the Super Famicom's Satellaview subunit under the name BS Lord Monarch.

=== Mega Drive version ===
The object is to destroy all the camps and peasants of all the player's rival kingdoms under a strict time limit. Alliances can be formed near the beginning of the game to help the player. However, the alliance is only effective until the enemy alliance is defeated. Then the former allies declare war on each other. Victory through a cunning alliance is impossible because game rules dictate that there can only be one winner at the end of the game; that is why the two former allies need to go to war in order to claim the victory. Peasants have to do engineering tasks as well as military tasks. For example, bridges, monster-filled caves, and fences can be created or destroyed for the purposes of strategy. Peasants may also merge their units to become soldiers and eventually knights when there are enough units in that army.

Players can play in either campaign (which consists of helping a king eradicate a rebel force) or battle mode (where players take on three rival kingdoms simultaneously while expanding their own nations). In battle mode the player can choose from a large array of different art styles, such as playing as a foreign Japanese army, animals trying to take over a forest, monsters in hell or even as a fast food business. These modes do not effect the gameplay in any way however each mode has its own unique levels. The simplistic diplomacy system can never be used in a match after five minutes in the game, making it useful only for delaying war with a neighboring kingdom. Human units as well as orcs and demons are used for peasants, soldiers, and knights. Also, a leader can be a warrior, a magician, or a shaman.

The player has a leader avatar that must liberate hanged men from the gallows to be his assistant, collect treasure chests from the countryside in order to gain a mass influx of gold, and force nearby cities to pay taxes. This turns the city's banners into the player's colors and at a random time, a taxman appears and brings gold pieces to the player's castle to help with the war effort. Taxes must be controlled or else the player will go bankrupt and lose the game. Even the three computer controlled opponents must control their tax rates. There is a medieval environment to the game in all levels of the game.

== Release ==
Lord Monarch was one of the 42 titles included in the Japanese version of the Mega Drive Mini.

In 2012, the PC-9801 versions of Lord Monarch and Advanced Lord Monarch was bundled in Dragon Slayer Chronicle for Microsoft Windows. It was later re-issued in 2023. Advanced Lord Monarch was re-released on the Nintendo Switch in 2026.
