= Dragon Slayer (series) =

- Genres: Role-playing; Action role-playing Action-adventure; Metroidvania; Open world Real-time strategy
- Developers: Nihon Falcom; Hudson Soft (Faxanadu)
- Publishers: Nihon Falcom; Square (MSX); Hudson Soft (Famicom); Nintendo (NES); Sierra On-Line (MS-DOS)
- Creator: Yoshio Kiya
- Composers: Falcom Sound Team JDK; Yuzo Koshiro; Toshiya Takahashi; Mieko Ishikawa; Jun Chikuma
- Platforms: PC-88, PC-98, MSX, MSX2, FM-7, Sharp X1, X68000, NES, TurboGrafx-16, MS-DOS, Super Cassette Vision, Game Boy, Mega Drive, Satellaview, PlayStation, Saturn, Windows, Dreamcast, Nokia N-Gage, Virtual Console
- First release: Dragon Slayer; 1984
- Latest release: The Legend of Heroes: Trails in the Sky 1st Chapter; September 19, 2025
- Spin-offs: Xanadu series The Legend of Heroes series

Dragon Slayer (ドラゴンスレイヤー, Doragon Sureiyā) is a video game franchise by Nihon Falcom mainly consisting of role-playing video games. The first Dragon Slayer game is an early action role-playing game, released in 1984 for the NEC PC-8801 and ported by Square for the MSX. Designed by Yoshio Kiya, the game gave rise to a series of sequels, most of them created by Falcom, with the exception of Faxanadu by Hudson Soft. The Dragon Slayer series is historically significant, both as a founder of the Japanese role-playing game industry, and as the progenitor of the action role-playing game genre.

The series encompasses several different genres, which include action role-playing, action-adventure, platform-adventure, open world, turn-based role-playing, and real-time strategy. Many of the early titles in this series were PC games released for the PC-88, PC-98, MSX, MSX2, and other early Japanese PC platforms, while some were later ported to video game consoles. The series also features video game music soundtracks composed by chiptune musician Yuzo Koshiro and the Falcom Sound Team JDK.

== History ==
Although commonly referred to as a series, the Dragon Slayer name is used to designate the body of work from producer Yoshio Kiya. There is no continuity in plot or even genre; however, most of the games use role-playing game (RPG) elements and experiment with real-time action gameplay.

=== Dragon Slayer and Xanadu (1984–1985) ===
The original Dragon Slayer and its sequel Dragon Slayer II: Xanadu are credited for being the progenitors of the action RPG genre, abandoning the command-oriented turn-based battles of previous RPGs in favour of real-time hack and slash combat that requires direct input from the player, alongside puzzle-solving elements. These games went on to influence later series such as The Legend of Zelda, Hydlide, and Falcom's own Ys. According to Games^{TM} and John Szczepaniak (of Retro Gamer and The Escapist), Enix's Dragon Quest was also influenced by Dragon Slayer and in turn defined many other RPGs.

The original Dragon Slayer, released for the PC-88 in 1984, is considered to be the first action-RPG. In contrast to earlier turn-based roguelikes, Dragon Slayer was a dungeon crawl RPG that was entirely real-time with action-oriented combat. Dragon Slayer also featured an in-game map to help with the dungeon-crawling, required item management due to the inventory being limited to one item at a time, and introduced the use of item-based puzzles which later influenced The Legend of Zelda. Dragon Slayer was a major success in Japan, where its overhead action-RPG formula was used in many later games. The game's MSX port was also one of the first titles to be published by Square.

The sequel Dragon Slayer II: Xanadu, released in 1985, was a full-fledged action RPG with many character statistics and a large quest. Xanadu incorporated a side-scrolling view during exploration and an overhead view during battle, though some rooms were also explored using an overhead view. The game also allowed the player to visit towns with training facilities that can improve statistics and shops that sell items, equipment that change the player character's visible appearance, and food that is consumed slowly over time and is essential for keeping the player character alive. It also introduced gameplay mechanics such as platform jumping, magic that can be used to attack enemies from a distance, an early Karma morality system where the character's Karma meter will rise if he commits sin which in turn affects his ability to level up, a heavier emphasis on puzzle-solving, and individual experience for equipped items. It is also considered a "proto-Metroidvania" game, due to being an "RPG turned on its side" that allowed players to run, jump, collect, and explore. The game gained immense popularity in Japan; it set sales records for PC games in the country, where it sold more than 400,000 copies. Xanadu Scenario II, released the following year, was also an early example of an expansion pack. The game was non-linear, allowing the eleven levels to be explored in any order. It was also composer Yuzo Koshiro's first video game music soundtrack.

According to creator Yoshio Kiya in 1987, when he developed Dragon Slayer, "Wizardry and Ultima were the only two kinds of RPGs", and so he "wanted to make something new" with Dragon Slayer which "was like a bridge" to the 'action RPG' genre and Xanadu took "those ideas to the next level", after which "more and more action RPGs were released" to the point that action RPGs became "one of the main genres of computer games". He also avoided random encounters, stating he "always thought there was something weird about randomized battles, fighting enemies you can't see, whether you want to or not".

=== Romancia to Sorcerian (1986–1987) ===
In 1986, Dragon Slayer Jr: Romancia simplified the RPG mechanics of Xanadu, such as removing the character customization and simplifying the numerical statistics into icons, and emphasized faster-paced platform action, with a strict 30-minute time limit. The action took place entirely in a side-scrolling view rather than switching to a separate overhead combat screen like its predecessor. These changes made Romancia more like a side-scrolling action-adventure game.

In 1987, Dragon Slayer IV: Drasle Family returned to the deeper action-RPG mechanics of Xanadu while maintaining the fully side-scrolling view of Romancia. The game also featured an open world and nonlinear gameplay similar to "Metroidvania" platform-adventures, making Drasle Family an early example of a non-linear, open-world action RPG. That same year also saw the release of Xanadu's spin-off Faxanadu, a side-scrolling platform-action RPG. Later that year, the fifth entry Sorcerian was released. It was a party-based action RPG, with the player controlling a party of four characters at the same time in a side-scrolling view. The game also featured character creation, highly customizable characters, class-based puzzles, and a new scenario system, allowing players to choose which of 15 scenarios, or quests, to play through in the order of their choice. It was also an episodic video game, with expansion disks released soon after offering more scenarios.

Two of the games released for the Nintendo Famicom, Dragon Slayer IV: Drasle Family and the spin-off of Xanadu known as Faxanadu, were released on the Nintendo Entertainment System in North America. The former was renamed Legacy of the Wizard. The second of the three games released for the Nintendo Famicom, Romancia, has never been released in North America for any platform. An English fan translation of the Famicom version of Romancia was released in April 2008, by DvD Translations. An English version of Sorcerian was released in North America for MS-DOS in 1990, published by Sierra On-Line.

=== The Legend of Heroes to Tokyo Xanadu (1989–2015) ===
An English version of the 1989 title Dragon Slayer: The Legend of Heroes was released for the TurboGrafx-CD in 1991, and is usually known as simply Dragon Slayer. A sequel, Dragon Slayer: The Legend of Heroes II, was released in 1992, but never saw an official English release. Subsequent The Legend of Heroes games dropped their association with the Dragon Slayer series. In contrast to the action-oriented gameplay of most other Dragon Slayer titles, both The Legend of Heroes titles use turn-based combat. The 1991 title Lord Monarch, on the other hand, was an early real-time strategy game. Several more games were released in the following years as part of the Xanadu subseries: the action role-playing games The Legend of Xanadu and The Legend of Xanadu II, released in 1994 and 1995 respectively, as well as Xanadu Next in 2005 and Tokyo Xanadu in 2015.

== List of games ==
Main titles
1984	Dragon Slayer
1985	Xanadu: Dragon Slayer II
1986	Dragon Slayer Jr: Romancia
1987	Legacy of the Wizard
1987	Sorcerian
1988
1989	Dragon Slayer: The Legend of Heroes
1990
1991	Lord Monarch
1992
1993
1994	The Legend of Xanadu

The games in the series include:

1. Dragon Slayer (1984)
  - Dragon Slayer Gaiden (1992)
  - Dragon Slayer: Michi Kareshi Houkan no Senshi-tachi (2012)
2. Xanadu: Dragon Slayer II (1985)
  - Xanadu Scenario II (1986)
  - Faxanadu (November 16, 1987)
  - Revival Xanadu (1995)
  - Revival Xanadu 2: Remix (1995)
  - Xanadu Next (2005)
  - Tokyo Xanadu (2015)
  - Tokyo Xanadu eX+ (2016)
  - Kyoto Xanadu (2026)
3. Dragon Slayer Jr: Romancia (1986)
  - Dragon Slayer Jr: Romancia ~Another Legend~ (1999)
4. Legacy of the Wizard (Dragon Slayer IV: Drasle Family) (1987)
5. Sorcerian (December 20, 1987)
  - Sorcerian Additional Scenario Vol. 1 (1988)
  - Sorcerian System Utility Vol.1 (1988)
  - Sorcerian Additional Scenario Vol. 2: Sengoku Sorcerian (1988)
  - Sorcerian Additional Scenario Vol. 3: Pyramid Sorcerian (1988)
  - Sorcerian System New Scenario Vol.1: Uchuu kara no Houmonsa (1989)
  - Selected Sorcerian 1 (1989)
  - Selected Sorcerian 2 (1990)
  - Selected Sorcerian 3 (1990)
  - Selected Sorcerian 4 (1990)
  - Selected Sorcerian 5 (1990)
  - Gilgamesh Sorcerian (1990)
  - Sorcerian Sega Mega Drive (1990)
  - Sorcerian PC-Engine (1990)
  - Sorcerian Forever (1997)
  - Sorcerian: Shichisei no Mahou no Shito (2000)
  - Sorcerian Original (2000)
  - Sorcerian Mobile (2003)
  - Sorcerian Online (2006)
  - Advanced Sorcerian (2007)
  - Sorcerian Complete (2010)
6. Dragon Slayer: The Legend of Heroes (1989)
  - Dragon Slayer: The Legend of Heroes II (1992)
7. Lord Monarch (1991)
  - Lord Monarch Advanced (1991)
  - Lord Monarch Super Famicom (1992)
  - Lord Monarch: Tokoton Sentou Densetsu (1994)
  - Lord Monarch Original (1996)
  - Lord Monarch The First (1997)
  - Lord Monarch Online (1997)
  - Lord Monarch Pro (1997)
  - Monarch Monarch (1998)
  - Minna no Mona Mona (1999)
  - Minna no Mona Mona 2 (1999)
  - Minna no Mona Mona 3 (1999)
  - Minna no Lord Monarch (1999)
  - Minna no Lord Monarch 2 (1999)
  - Minna no Lord Monarch 3 (1999)
  - Mobile Edition Lord Monarch (2004)
8. The Legend of Xanadu (1994)
  - The Legend of Xanadu II (1995)
