= Prophecy: The Fall of Trinadon =

1989 video game

Prophecy I: The Fall of Trinadon
- Developer(s): Activision
- Publisher(s): Activision
- Designer(s): Richard L. Seaborne; Alan J. Murphy
- Platform(s): MS-DOS
- Release: 1989
- Genre(s): Action RPG
- Mode(s): Single-player

Prophecy I: The Fall of Trinadon is an action role-playing game created in 1989 by Activision.

== Plot ==
The game takes place in the Gendorian empire, ruled by a tyrant named Krellane. The unnamed hero's father was part of a resistance movement called the "Jedists," but he ran afoul of Krellane's forces and was forced to flee into the forests, where he founded a hidden town called CrissCross. The hero was raised with martial and magical training, in hopes that he would one day fulfill a prophecy and destroy Krellane. Just as the game begins, Krellane's forces have found the village. The hero awakens to the shrieks of his fellow townsfolk being butchered in the night and soon discovers he is the last survivor.

== Reception ==
In 1989, Dragon gave the game 3½ out of 5 stars. Computer Gaming World gave the game a glowing review, saying, "Prophecy can be played as an arcade game, allowing players to go around bashing monsters and collecting treasure to their heart's content, but its real magic is that the fiction is totally believable."

In 1992, Computer Gaming World retrospectively described it as "Another of the Nintendo-style, single-character CRPGs, with a plot heavily borrowed from Star Wars" but with "Fast-paced arcade fighting". They concluded it to be fun for "those who like their action hot and heavy" but not for "those who aren't into arcade-type" combat.

== Reviews ==
- ASM (Aktueller Software Markt) - May, 1989
- ACE (Advanced Computer Entertainment) - Jul, 1989
