= Xanadu Next =

2005 video game

- Developers: Nihon Falcom; ScriptArts (N-Gage)
- Publishers: JP: Nihon Falcom; WW: Xseed Games; Nokia (N-Gage)
- Director: Takayuki Kusano
- Producer: Masayuki Kato
- Writer: Toshihiro Kondo
- Composers: Hayato Sonoda; Wataru Ishibashi; Takahide Murayama; Takahiro Unisuga
- Platforms: N-Gage, Windows
- Release: N-Gage: NA: 20 June 2005; Windows: JP: 27 October 2005; WW: 3 November 2016
- Genre: Action role-playing
- Mode: Single-player

Xanadu Next is a 2005 action role-playing game developed by Nihon Falcom for Microsoft Windows. The game is a spin-off of the 1985 game Dragon Slayer II: Xanadu. Xanadu Next was released worldwide in English by Xseed Games in 2016. An N-Gage version was developed by ScriptArts and published by Nokia a few months prior to original Japanese release.

== Plot ==
The player character is a dishonored knight hired by a scholar named Charlotte L. Wells to investigate the ruins of Harlech Island on her behalf. Almost as soon as he begins, however, he is mortally wounded by a mysterious warrior named Dvorak and must undergo a life-saving process which binds him to Harlech. He will now die if he ever leaves – unless he can find the fabled Dragon Slayer sword, which is the only item capable of severing his ties with Harlech and giving him his life back.

In the N-Gage version, the player character is instead a hunter who has been hired by a small town named Marion Berck to find a missing girl named Momo who disappeared after King-Dragon attacked. Since King-Dragon's attack, the villagers have been plagued by mysterious deaths, dying crops, and monster attacks, and the players must guide the hunter in the journey to find Momo.

== Reception ==
Reception

Aggregate scores
Aggregator	Score	
Aggregator	N-Gage	PC
GameRankings	65%	78%
Metacritic		78/100

Review scores
Publication	Score	
Publication	N-Gage	PC
GameSpot	6.6/10	
GameSpy	3.5/5	
RPGamer		3/5

The N-Gage version received mixed reviews, but the Windows version received generally favourable reviews.
