= Ys I =

1987 video game

- Developer: Nihon Falcom
- Publisher: Nihon Falcom
- Director: Masaya Hashimoto
- Producer: Masayuki Kato
- Designer: Masaya Hashimoto
- Programmer: Masaya Hashimoto
- Writer: Tomoyoshi Miyazaki
- Composers: Yuzo Koshiro; Mieko Ishikawa; Masaya Hashimoto
- Series: Ys
- Platform: PC-88: Sharp X1, PC-98, FM-7, MSX2, Famicom, Master System, MS-DOS, Apple IIGS, X68000, Sega Saturn, Windows, Nintendo Switch
- Release: June 21, 1987: PC-88; JP: June 21, 1987 X1; JP: June 26, 1987 PC-98; JP: August 28, 1987 FM-7; JP: October 8, 1987 MSX2; JP: December 10, 1987 Famicom; JP: August 26, 1988 Master System; JP: October 15, 1988; NA: March 1989; EU: 1989 Apple IIGS, MS-DOS; NA: 1989 X68000; JP: July 19, 1991 Saturn; JP: November 6, 1997 Windows; JP: April 24, 1998 Switch; WW: February 15, 2024
- Genre: Action role-playing
- Mode: Single-player

Ys I, originally known as Ys and titled on-screen Ancient Ys Vanished: Omen, is a 1987 action role-playing game developed by Nihon Falcom. It is the first installment in the Ys series. Initially developed for the PC-88 by Masaya Hashimoto (director, programmer, designer) and Tomoyoshi Miyazaki (scenario writer), the game was soon ported to the Sharp X1, PC-98, FM-7, and MSX2 Japanese computer systems.

Set in a land called Esteria, the story centers around the titular civilization called Ys, which had mysteriously vanished 700 years ago with only traces of its existence being kept within the game's six books. When it is prophesied that an impeding darkness would come to threaten Esteria, a young and adventurous warrior named Adol Christin is called forward to collect these six books to aid him in vanquishing the darkness.

Ys I saw many subsequent releases, such as an English-language version for the Master System and an enhanced remake for the TurboGrafx-CD system as part of a compilation called Ys I & II, alongside its 1988 sequel Ys II: Ancient Ys Vanished – The Final Chapter. It was also adapted into an OVA series Ys. DotEmu has released the game on Android with the following localizations: English, French, Japanese, Korean, Russian, Italian, German, and Portuguese. A Nintendo Switch port of the game, based on the original PC-8800 release, was released in February 2024, 37 years after the game's initial release.

== Plot ==
Ys was a precursor to role-playing games that emphasize storytelling. The hero of Ys is an adventurous young swordsman named Adol Christin. As the story begins, he has just arrived at the Town of Minea, in the land of Esteria. He is called upon by Sara, a fortune-teller, who tells him of a great evil that is sweeping the land.

Adol is informed that he must seek out the six Books of Ys. These books contain the history of the ancient land of Ys, and will give him the knowledge he needs to defeat the evil forces. Sara gives Adol a crystal for identification and instructs him to find her aunt in Zepik Village, who holds the key to retrieving one of the Books. With that, his quest begins.

Ys, the floating island featured in this game, was inspired by the mythical city Ys.

== Gameplay ==
The player controls Adol on a game field viewed from a top-down perspective. As he travels on the main field and explores dungeons, Adol encounters numerous roaming enemies, which he must battle in order to progress.

Combat in Ys is rather different from other games of the era, which either had turn-based battles or a manually activated sword. Ys instead features a battle system where fighters automatically attack when walking into their enemies off-center. When one fighter comes into contact with an enemy, damage can be sustained on both sides if both combatants are facing each other. Attacking straight-on causes the attacker the most damage to himself, but clipping the edge of the defender causes the attacked fighter to take most or all of the damage. If one fighter contacts the enemy's side or back, only the attacked fighter will sustain damage. This combat system was created with accessibility in mind. This "bump attack" system has become one of the series' defining features. Falcom staff have compared this style of gameplay to the enjoyment of popping air bubble sheets, in the sense that it took the tedious task of level-grinding and turned it into something similar to a high-score-based arcade video game. According to Games^{TM} and John Szczepaniak of Retro Gamer and The Escapist, "repetition of the act was pleasurable as you developed a psychological rhythm and, even in the event of backtracking, progress was always swift since the player never needed to stop moving".

Another feature that has been used in nearly every Ys title since the original is the recharging health mechanism, which had previously been used in the Hydlide series. Recharging health has since become a common mechanism used in many video games today.

== Ports ==
Aside from graphical differences, the game layout remains essentially the same across the many ports of Ys; there are some versions where the details were changed. The Master System version, for example, saw some of the game's dungeon areas flipped horizontally (including some other minor differences).

The most distinctive of the early ports was the Famicom edition, which was published by Victor Musical Industries. This version was a vast departure from the original, featuring entirely new layouts for the towns, field, and dungeons, replacement of a number of the original musical tracks, and a new final battle sequence.

The version developed for the MSX2 contained a handful of new musical tracks which replaced part of the original game's soundtrack. Some of these tracks, along with a number of unused tracks first composed for the original, were later incorporated into the soundtrack of Ys Eternal and Ys Complete.

The versions developed for the TurboGrafx-CD, released as Ys I & II in 1989, included additional cutscenes, such as an opening detailing Adol's arrival in the town of Minea. The Microsoft Windows-based remakes, Ys Eternal and Ys Complete, expand further on this and many other story elements, through both cutscenes and additional gameplay.

The 1991 remake for the X68000 uses pre-rendered 3D graphics for the boss sprites, which was called "a bizarre contrast" with the game's mostly 2D graphics.

In 1997, a port was released for Sega Saturn, included in the Falcom Classics release for Japanese systems only.

In 2024, a Nintendo Switch port based on the PC-8801 version was released by D4 Enterprise as part of their EGGCONSOLE series.

== Music ==
Composed by Yuzo Koshiro along with Mieko Ishikawa, the soundtrack is notable for its rich melodies, in an age when video game music was beginning to progress from monotonous bleeps. The Ys soundtrack is considered to have some of the best video game music ever composed, and is considered one of the finest and most influential role-playing video game scores of all time.

Several soundtrack albums dedicated to the music of Ys have been released by Falcom. This includes:

- Music from Ys (1987): Contains the soundtrack to the original PC-8801 edition, along with a number of unused tracks and the replacement tracks used in the MSX edition, many of which were later incorporated into the Ys Eternal soundtrack. Also included are five arranged tracks from Ryo Yonemitsu, who arranged the soundtrack to the TurboGrafx-CD version of Ys I & II (1989).
- Perfect Collection Ys (1990): A two-disc release, the first disc of which is a new arrangement of the Ys soundtrack by Ryo Yonemitsu. The second disc contains assorted arrangements of tracks from both Ys I and II.
- Music from Ys Renewal (1995): The complete Ys soundtrack, including the bonus tracks, reproduced on upgraded synthesizer equipment.

== Reception ==
Reception

Aggregate scores
Aggregator	Score			
Aggregator	Master System	mobile	NES	PC
GameRankings		76%		
Sega Retro	86% (13 reviews)			

Review scores
Publication	Score			
Publication	Master System	mobile	NES	PC
ACE	920/1000			
Computer and Video Games	92%			
Electronic Gaming Monthly	Hit!			
Famitsu	31/40		30/40	
Mean Machines Sega	88%			
RPGamer	3/5		3/5	
RPGFan		75%		94%
The Games Machine (UK)	90%			
Tilt	16/20			
Sega Pro	85%			
Shin Force	8.9/10			
S: The Sega Magazine	89%			
Famicom Hisshoubon			3.5/5	

The Master System version of Ys received positive reviews. It was reviewed in the March 1989 issue of Computer and Video Games magazine, stating that it has some of the best graphics on the system and that it "offers depth and playability" that "will keep you engrossed for weeks". The Games Machine compared the game to The Legend of Zelda, stating that "in many respects, the character detail and all-round presentation make it the better game visually", and concludes that Ys is "one of the top-rank RPGs around". ACE magazine in 1989 listed Ys as the second best Master System game available at the time, praising the "huge scrolling" world, characters who "can be questioned" and "good deal of role-playing" depth.

Scorpia of Computer Gaming World in 1993 reviewed the Apple IIGS and IBM PC versions of Ys. She stated that the game was "a fairly simple entry with a few puzzles to solve" along with "Nintendo-style combat and graphics" that was "a romp" and "interesting mainly for seeing what the Japanese do in terms of lightweight CRPGs".

Japanese gaming magazine Famitsu gave the Famicom (NES) version of the game a score of 30 out of 40. Famitsu also gave Ys I & II for the PC Engine CD-ROM (TurboGrafx-CD) a score of 35 out of 40.

== See also ==
- Dragon Slayer (series)
