= Expansion pack =

Addition to a game

An expansion pack, expansion set, supplement, or simply expansion is an addition to an existing role-playing game, tabletop game, video game, collectible card game or miniature wargame. An expansion may introduce new rules or game mechanics that augment the original game and add more variety to playing it. In the case of video games, they typically add new game areas, weapons, objects, characters, adventures or an extended storyline to an already-released game. In tabletop role-playing games, they might take the form of a campaign setting or a stand-alone adventure for players to experience.

While board game expansions are typically designed by the original creator, video game developers sometimes contract out development of the expansion pack to a third-party company, it may choose to develop the expansion itself, or it may do both.

Board games and tabletop RPGs may have been marketing expansions since the 1970s, and video games have been releasing expansion packs since the 1980s, early examples being the Dragon Slayer games Xanadu Scenario II and Sorcerian. Other terms for the concept are module and, in certain games' marketing, adventure.

== Characteristics ==
The price of an expansion pack is usually much less than that of the original game. As expansion packs consist solely of additional content, most require the original game in order to play. Games with many expansions often begin selling the original game with prior expansions, such as The Sims Deluxe Edition (The Sims with The Sims: Livin' Large). These bundles make the game more accessible to new players. When games reach the end of their lifespan, the publisher often releases a 'complete' or 'gold' collection, which includes the game and all its subsequent expansions.

== Stand-alone expansion packs ==
Some expansion packs do not require the original game in order to use the new content, as is the case with Half-Life: Blue Shift, Uncharted: The Lost Legacy, Dishonored: Death of the Outsider or Sonic & Knuckles. Some art, sound, and code are reused from the original game. In some cases, a stand-alone expansion such as Heroes of Might and Magic III: The Shadow of Death, or Dungeon Siege: Legends of Aranna includes the original game.

== Console game expansion packs ==
Expansion packs are most commonly released for PC games, but are becoming increasingly prevalent for video game consoles, particularly due to the popularity of downloadable content. The increasing number of multi-platform games has also led to the release of more expansion packs on consoles, especially stand-alone expansion packs (as described above). Command & Conquer 3: Kane's Wrath, for example, requires the original Command & Conquer 3: Tiberium Wars to play on the PC, but Xbox 360 versions of both the original Tiberium Wars and Kane's Wrath are available, neither of which require one another.

The Japanese version of Konami's Beatmania was the first game on the PlayStation to support expansion packs, which were branded as append discs. These discs included additional tracks and required the original Beatmania disc (and later playable Beatmania game discs) to play. The discs required the player to access the Disc Change menu on the Beatmania disc, remove the Beatmania disc, insert an append disc, then press the start button to play. The first append disc for the game, Beatmania Append Yebisu Mix, was bundled with the PlayStation version as the game's 2nd disc, with subsequent append discs being released as standalone retail releases.

Grand Theft Auto: London 1969 was marketed as the first expansion pack released for the PlayStation. The game required the player to insert the London disc, remove it, insert the original Grand Theft Auto disc, remove it, then insert the London media again in order to play.

Sonic & Knuckles for the Mega Drive/Genesis was unusual in that it functioned as both a stand-alone cartridge and as an expansion pack for both Sonic the Hedgehog 2 and Sonic the Hedgehog 3.

== Collectible card game expansions ==
Collectible card games, or CCGs for short, are typically released as expansion sets, composed of booster packs. CCGs may be referred to as "living" or "dead", and living CCGs are routinely published with supplementary expansions. CCGs generally do not have a core set that is reprinted indefinitely, instead, they are retired and replaced with new expansions on a quarterly or bi-annual basis. Expansions usually introduce new rules, or game mechanics, expanding the game's library of cards and rules set.

== See also ==
- Downloadable content
- Episodic video game
- Mod (video games)
- Special edition
