= The Eternal Dagger =

1987 video game

- Developer: Strategic Simulations
- Publisher: Strategic Simulations
- Designers: Paul Murray; Victor Penman
- Platforms: Apple II, Atari 8-bit, Commodore 64
- Release: 1987
- Genre: Role-playing
- Mode: Single-player

The Eternal Dagger is a top-down role-playing video game published by Strategic Simulations in 1987. It is a sequel to Wizard's Crown from 1986. Demons from another dimension are invading the world, and the only item that can seal the portal is the titular dagger. Players can transfer their characters over from Wizard's Crown, minus whatever magical items they had on them.

== Reception ==
SSI sold 18,471 copies of The Eternal Dagger in North America.

Computer Gaming World's Scorpia in 1987 described the gameplay as very similar to that of its predecessor, with a few changed spells and in-battle options. She praised the use of a single character to represent the party, but disliked dungeon combat because of the extra step of maneuvering party members into attack positions. Scorpia also felt the game did not have the same balance as the previous, with magic being a much more effective option overall. She also found combat to be more difficult, with wide discrepancies between the "quick combat" option and tactical combat, and monsters that generally take much longer to kill. Scorpia also criticized the new fatigue, which decreases weapon skill as party members go without rest, for lengthening travel time and slowing down the game. She concluded that The Eternal Dagger was not of the same quality as its predecessor, and recommended patience when playing the game. In 1993 Scorpia reiterated that The Eternal Dagger was "not as good as the previous game" and, despite the "interesting plot idea, this game is only for the patient".

In his column for ANALOG Computing, Steve Panak criticized the game's "overly complex and poorly designed setup procedure and difficult-to-use command structure", but stated that the time needed to finish the game and its predecessor "is 50 hours well spent indeed". The game was reviewed in 1988 in Dragon #129 by Hartley, Patricia, and Kirk Lesser in "The Role of Computers" column. The reviewers gave the game 1 1/2 out of 5 stars.
