= Legacy of the Wizard =

1987 video game

- North American NES box art
- Developer: Nihon Falcom
- Publishers: Nihon Falcom; NES: JP: Namco; NA: Broderbund
- Designer: Yoshio Kiya
- Composers: Yuzo Koshiro; Mieko Ishikawa
- Series: Dragon Slayer
- Platforms: MSX2, NES
- Release: MSX2: JP: July 10, 1987; NES: JP: July 17, 1987; NA: May 1989
- Genres: Action role-playing, platformer
- Mode: Single-player

Dragon Slayer IV: Drasle Family, (Note: ドラゴンスレイヤーIV ドラスレファミリー, Doragon Sureiyā IV Dorasure Famirī) released outside Japan as Legacy of the Wizard, is a 1987 action role-playing platform video game developed and published by Nihon Falcom for the MSX2. A port for the Nintendo Entertainment System was released in Japan in July 1987 by Namco and internationally in 1989 by Broderbund. It is the fourth installment of the Dragon Slayer series, and one of only five Dragon Slayer games that were localized outside Japan. The game was an early example of an open-world, non-linear action RPG, combining action-RPG gameplay with what would later be called "Metroidvania"-style action-adventure elements.

== Plot ==
The game chronicles the story of the Drasle family (an abbreviation for "Dragon Slayer", though the characters are given the last name "Worzen" in the credits) and their attempt to destroy an ancient dragon named Keela that is magically entrapped in a painting within an underground labyrinth. To accomplish this goal, they must find the "Dragon Slayer", a magical sword that is protected by four hidden crowns. The player must use the unique abilities of each member of the family to regain possession of the crowns and destroy the evil Keela. Like many games of its era, the story of Legacy of the Wizard is explained almost entirely in the game's instruction manual.

== Gameplay ==
The Drasle family consists of six members of three generations, plus the family pet, which resembles a small dinosaur. The player takes control of the members of the Drasles and their pet, sending them one at a time into the vast cavern filled with traps, puzzles and monsters, in search of the four crowns, while periodically returning to the family household on the surface to change characters and to obtain a password. Each member of the family, which consists of the father, mother, son, daughter, and the pet, has different strengths and weaknesses to contribute to this goal. Some characters have seemingly powerful strengths, but each is offset by proportionate limitations. For example, the father has the strongest attack power, but cannot jump as high as the rest of the family. The mother of the family has relatively weak attributes, but is the only one who can use specific magical items required to find one of the crowns. By discovering and utilizing each character's strengths, the player travels through the extensive dungeon, eventually fighting four bosses to gain the crowns.

The game's vast labyrinth has five major sections, four of which contain a boss who guards one of the crowns, and the fifth which contains the final boss. Each section has noticeably different characteristics and different background music, and was designed with one particular playable character in mind. The crowns cannot be acquired without the player utilizing the family members' specific skills to get through the sections of the dungeon. Therefore, each playable character must be used at some point in order to complete the game. For example, one section may be blocked with bricks that can only be destroyed by the mattock, so the player must use the character who can use the mattock to get through such an area. After all four crowns have been acquired, the family's young boy can use the magic of the crowns to find the Dragon Slayer, and then use the magical sword to slay the evil Keela.

The player will encounter an endless supply of monsters while running through convoluted passageways. Each character can fire shots of varying strength to defeat these monsters, but attacking uses up the character's magic power. Most of these monsters drop items when defeated, such as keys which can be used to open locked doors and treasure chests, bread which restores the player's health, potions which restore magic power, and sometimes poison which harms the player. Money can also be collected from defeated monsters, and then spent in shops and inns located throughout the dungeon.

The characters in Legacy of the Wizard must utilize several magical items in their quest. These can be acquired from chests or bought in shops that are sometimes located in very impractical locations. Item effects include restoring the character's health and magic power, boosting attack power or range, or environmental effects like enabling the character to fly or move special bricks. Some items can only be used by certain characters, and since accomplishing the goals requires the use of these items, it is up to the player to determine which character must be used to regain each crown. Acquiring these items and finding how to properly use them is the essence of Legacy of the Wizard.

== Characters ==
The character select screen, displaying the entire Drasle family

- Xemn is a woodcutter and the head of the Drasle family household. He has the highest attack power of the playable characters, and is the only character who can use the magical gloves to move special blocks in the dungeon. He is listed as "Warrior" in the credits.
- Meyna is Xemn's wife. Her attacks are stronger than those of the children, but weaker than Xemn's. She is the only one who can use the magical wings, the magical key, and the crossbow. She is listed as "Wizard" in the credits.
- Roas is the brave son of Xemn and Meyna. He is the only one who can use the four crowns to find the Dragon Slayer, and is the only one who can wield the Dragon Slayer sword itself. His attacks are weak, and his main use in the game is to find the Dragon Slayer and to use it to defeat the final boss. He is listed as "Ranger" in the credits.
- Lyll is Roas's sister and the daughter of Meyna and Xemn. She can jump higher than the rest of the family, and is also the only one who can use the mattock to destroy special blocks in the dungeon. Her attacks are equal in power to Roas. She is listed as "Elf" in the credits.
- Pochi is the family's pet. He acts like a dog, but is actually a monster from the underground dungeon. His attacks are powerful, but his attack range is limited. He cannot jump very high, and can use few magical items. His most distinctive attribute is relative immunity: the monsters in the dungeon do not harm him. Pochi can even stand on the monsters' heads, using them as stepping stones to reach places he could not normally reach due to his poor jumping ability. He is listed as "Monster" in the credits.
- Jiela is the grandmother of Roas and Lyll. She appears on the character select screen, but she is not a playable character. When a player selects her, she supplies the password needed to continue their progress in the game.
- Douel is the grandfather of Roas and Lyll. He was once a powerful wizard, who trapped the evil dragon Keela in a painting long ago. He is also on the character select screen, but he is not a playable character. When a player selects him, he prompts them to enter the password given by Jiela so they can continue the game.

== Release ==
Dragon Slayer IV: The Drasle Family was first released for the MSX2 home computer on July 10, 1987, developed and published by Nihon Falcom. The game is sometimes misattributed to Quintet due to a reference in the game's ending credits, but composer Yuzo Koshiro has confirmed this is pure coincidence, since the company wasn't formed until two years later.

It was ported to the Famicom and released on July 17, a week after the MSX2 version. Based on the staff from the ending credits, the Famicom port was developed internally by Falcom. It was published in Japan by Namco and released two years later for the NES in North America by Broderbund.

In 2008, the game was released for mobile phones in Japan.

In 2020, Bandai Namco Entertainment released the NES version on the international version of Namcot Collection.

== Reception ==
Computer Entertainer reviewed the NES version in 1989, scoring it 7 out of 8 stars. 1Up later called it a "hidden gem" for the NES in 2005.
