= Sorcerian =

1987 video game

- PC-8801 cover art
- Developer: Nihon Falcom
- Publisher: Nihon Falcom
- Producer: Masayuki Kato
- Designer: Yoshio Kiya
- Composers: Yuzo Koshiro; Mieko Ishikawa; Reiko Takebayashi; Hideya Nagata; Takahito Abe
- Series: Dragon Slayer
- Platform: PC-8801: PC-9801, PC-88VA, X1 Turbo, MSX2, MS-DOS, Mega Drive, PC Engine CD, Windows, iOS
- Release: December 20, 1987: PC-8801; JP: December 20, 1987 Mega Drive; JP: February 24, 1990 MS-DOS; NA: April 1, 1990 MSX2; JP: August 10, 1991 PC Engine CD; JP: July 17, 1992 Windows; JP: 1997 iOS; JP: January 20, 2012
- Genre: Action role-playing
- Mode: Single-player

Sorcerian (Note: Japanese: ソーサリアン, Hepburn: Sōsarian) is a 1987 action role-playing game developed by Nihon Falcom as the fifth installment in the Dragon Slayer line of games. Originally released for the NEC PC-8801, it has since been released on a wide variety of platforms.

== Gameplay ==
Sorcerian is a side-scrolling action-RPG. The player can create up to ten characters, from whom up to four members can be present in a party at the same time. Each character is highly customizable, with four different classes/races (fighter, wizard, elf, and dwarf) and over 60 possible jobs/occupations (ranging from clown to exorcist) available for them to perform; each has its own strengths and weaknesses, affecting the seven primary attributes (strength, intelligence, protection, magic resistance, vitality, dexterity, and karma) in different ways, as well as different equipment limitations.

The player can choose from fifteen different scenarios, or quests, to play through in the order of their choice. The party must battle enemies and perform tasks within the given levels to clear each scenario, before moving onto another scenario of their choice. The player controls the entire party at the same time, with all four members running in a line, jumping in sequence, and attacking in unison. The party members follow behind in a manner similar to the Options in the arcade shooter Gradius (1985). Sorcerian also employs class-based puzzles, such as using a high-strength character to force open doors.

All the characters have a default starting age of 16. Each time a player begins a new scenario, a year passes by, while additional time passes by in towns as a character goes through training or enchants items. The characters age at different rates depending on their race, with humans reaching old age at 60, dwarves at 100, and elves at 200. Upon reaching old age, for every year that passes, a character can die permanently at a random time. There is also an "Advance Time" to speed up the flow of time. Another new feature of Sorcerian was its episodic format that extended across various expansion packs. Besides the default fifteen scenarios that come with the game, there were a number of additional scenario packs released. The aging system was created with the additional scenario packs in mind.

== Development ==
Sorcerian was developed by Japanese developer Nihon Falcom. It is the fifth installment in the Dragon Slayer series.

== Release ==
Sorcerian was originally released for the NEC PC-8801 in 1987, and was later ported to other personal computer platforms such as the NEC PC-9801, the NEC PC-88VA, the Sharp X1 Turbo, and the MSX2, for which it was released under the title Dragon Slayer V: Sorcerian. An English version for MS-DOS was published by Sierra Entertainment in 1990. Ports for the Atari ST, Amiga, Apple IIGS and Macintosh platforms were announced but not released.

In 1997, Falcom released Sorcerian Forever for Microsoft Windows-based PCs. In 2000, Falcom released Sorcerian Original, a remake of Sorcerian for Windows-based PCs. In addition, console versions of Sorcerian with somewhat differing content from their PC counterparts were developed: a version for the Mega Drive was developed by Sega, a version for the PC Engine CD was developed by Victor Musical Industries, and a version for the Dreamcast titled Sorcerian: Shichisei Mahou no Shito was developed by Exe-Create and Media JuGGLer. The Mega Drive version was re-released on the Wii's Virtual Console in September 2008. An iOS version was released in January 2012, by Aeria Inc. The base game includes five free scenarios and a maximum party size of five characters. Pay versions include 10 extra scenarios, with a maximum party size of 10 characters.

As part of Sorcerian's 25th anniversary, between December 6 and 20, 2012, Sorcerian for iOS was released for free, and three in-game items (10000 Gold, revival LV3 x2, magic item x3) were free, with registering AeriaGames members receiving three revival LV3 in-game items. In 2014, the PC-88 version was released along with Romancia for the retro game distribution service EGG.

The mobile (iAppli) version, called Advanced Sorcerian, was re-released on Nintendo Switch through the G-Mode Archives label in February 2021.

== Add-ons ==
A number of add-on expansion packs containing new scenarios were developed for the PC-8801 version of Sorcerian, by both Falcom themselves and by other companies:

- Developed by Falcom: Sorcerian Utility Vol. 1, Sorcerian Additional Scenario Vol. 1, Sorcerian Additional Scenario Vol. 2 – Sengoku Sorcerian, Sorcerian Additional Scenario Vol. 3 – Pyramid Sorcerian
- Developed by Amorphous: Sorcerian New Scenario Vol. 1 – The Visitor from Outer Space, Selected Sorcerian 1, Selected Sorcerian 2, Selected Sorcerian 3, Selected Sorcerian 4, Selected Sorcerian 5
- Developed by Quasar Soft: Gilgamesh Sorcerian

== Music ==
The soundtrack to the original Sorcerian was composed by Yuzo Koshiro, Mieko Ishikawa, Reiko Takebayashi, Hideya Nagata, and Takahito Abe. The Falcom-developed Additional Scenarios were handled solely by Ishikawa. The music for the original Sorcerian was arranged by Kenji Kawai for the PC Engine CD release. Rob Atesalp and Ken Allen converted the original score to be a MT-32 MIDI-compatible arrangement of the soundtrack for Sierra Entertainment's English version of the game.

Soundtrack releases for Sorcerian include:

- Music from Sorcerian: The original score to the PC-88 version of the game.
- All Sounds of Sorcerian: The original sound again, this time in the form of medleys for each scenario, along with two arranged tracks.
- Sorcerian Super Arrange Version: A series of three albums featuring arrangements by Hiroyuki Namba. Volume 1 contains a set of arrangements from the base scenario of Sorcerian. Volume 2 contains arrangements from the base scenario and Additional Scenario Vol. 1, along with the original sound of Additional Scenario Vol. 1. Volume 3 contains arrangements and the original sound from Additional Scenario Vol. 2 and Vol. 3.
- Perfect Collection Sorcerian: A set of three two-disc albums containing various arrangements of the base Sorcerian soundtrack, similar to the Perfect Collection Ys album series.
- Sorcerian Forever I & II: Two albums containing upgraded versions of the Sorcerian base scenario soundtrack, similar to the Music from Ys Renewal releases.

== Reception ==
Reception

Review score
Publication	Score
Famitsu	8/10, 7/10, 7/10, 5/10 (MD)

The four reviewers of Famicom Tsūshin reviewed Sega Mega Drive version of the game.

Two of the reviewers complimented the game as having same atmosphere as the PC game but with re-arranged levels and recommended to fans of the original. One reviewer found the game confusing and said they could not figure out the game mechanics.)

In the July 1990 edition of Games International (issue 16), Theo Clarke was disappointed in this game, calling the animation "rudimentary", and that there was "little realism in the game". He thought it was far more an arcade game than a role-playing game, and awarded it a below average rating of only 6 out of 10, calling it "a well-preserved museum piece".

In the October 1991 edition of Computer Gaming World, Scorpia noted it has "an interesting feature or two" and liked the game's division into many miniquests, stating that instead "of the usual long adventure, this one sports fifteen separate small quests" which "allows for a certain amount of variety". She however disliked the magic system, and stated that "the action is arcade in style, which is typical for a Japanese game, and some will find this irksome" but noted "this is not just hack-and-slash, as there are puzzles to be solved along the way". Scorpia concluded that Sorcerian was a "good for a change of pace" for those comfortable with "arcade" action.

During production of PlatinumGames title Scalebound, game designer Hideki Kamiya said he was inspired by Sorcerian as well as Hydlide 3. He noted the influence of Sorcerian's fantasy theme, "gigantic monsters", different scenarios, "expansive possibilities", "tons of adventures" and enemies such as a hydra boss and "lots of amazing dragons".

== Future ==
In 2016, Kondo expressed interest in developing a remake of Sorcerian.
