= Action role-playing game =

Subgenre of role-playing and action video games

An action role-playing game (commonly abbreviated to Action RPG or ARPG) is a video game genre that combines core elements from both the action game and role-playing game genres.

== Definition ==
Action role-playing games emphasize real-time combat that challenges a player's physical coordination or reaction time, as opposed to turn or menu-based combat. These games often use action game combat systems similar to hack and slash or shooter games. Action role-playing games and action-adventure games differ as the former include role-playing game mechanics like player driven characters creation, decision-making regarding player character development, skill trees, or direct control over a customizable team of game characters, usually called a party. The player character's stats determine relative strength, effectiveness or abilities and can increase when a character gains a level. MMORPGs with real-time combat systems are also ARPGs.

== History ==
=== Early 1980s: Precursors ===
Several games prior to 1984 are considered precursors to the action RPG genre. Jeremy Parish of USgamer cited Adventure (1980). Bill Loguidice and Matt Barton cited the Intellivision games Advanced Dungeons & Dragons (1982) and Treasure of Tarmin (1983). Shaun Musgrave of TouchArcade discussed Adventure, Bokosuka Wars (1983) and Gateway to Apshai (1983). He noted Adventure lacked RPG mechanics such as experience points or permanent character growth, arguing that Gateway to Apshai is "the earliest game I'd feel comfortable calling an action-RPG" but that "it doesn't fit neatly into our modern genre classifications" though came closer than Bokosuka Wars.

=== Mid-1980s: Emergence of genre ===
According to Jeremy Parish of 1UP, the action RPG genre was established by several Japanese developers in 1984, who combined the role-playing genre with arcade‑style action and action-adventure elements. Shaun Musgrave of TouchArcade also traces the genre's roots to Japan, and notes that the "Western game industry of the time had a tendency to treat action games and RPGs as separate things for separate demographics". Jeremy Parish has reported action RPGs were popularized by The Tower of Druaga in Japan. It was released for arcades in June 1984, and was intended as a "fantasy version of Pac-Man, with puzzles to solve, monsters to battle, and hidden treasure to find". Its success in Japan inspired the development of Dragon Slayer (1984) and Hydlide (1984). Dragon Slayer, Hydlide and Courageous Perseus (1984) "vie for position as genre precedent" states John Szczepaniak, and there was an ongoing rivalry between the Dragon Slayer and Hydlide series over the years. Falcom's Dragon Slayer, created by Yoshio Kiya, is "the very first action-RPG ever made" as claimed by GameSetWatch. Originally released for the PC-8801 computer in September 1984, it abandoned the command-based battles of earlier role-playing games in favor of real-time hack-and-slash combat that required direct input from the player, alongside puzzle elements. In contrast to earlier turn-based roguelikes, Dragon Slayer was a dungeon-crawl role-playing game with real-time, action-oriented combat, combined with traditional role-playing mechanics. Dragon Slayer's overhead action role-playing formula was used in many later games. The Tower of Druaga, Dragon Slayer and Hydlide were influential in Japan, where they influenced later action RPGs such as Ys, as well as action-adventure games like The Legend of Zelda.

T&E Soft's Hydlide, released in December 1984, was created by Tokihiro Naito, who was influenced by The Tower of Druaga. It was the first action RPG with an overworld. The game was immensely popular in Japan, and sold 2 million copies across all platforms. John Szczepaniak claims that it "cannot be overstated how influential Hydlide was on the ARPGs which followed it". The same year, Courageous Perseus was also one of the earliest action RPGs. Dragon Slayer II: Xanadu, released in 1985 (billed as a "new type of real-time role-playing game"), was an action role-playing game with many character stats and a large quest. It also incorporated a side-scrolling view for exploration and an overhead view for battle, and an early "Karma" morality system where the character's Karma meter will rise if he sins (kills "good" enemies), which in turn causes the temples to refuse to level him up. Xanadu Scenario II, released in 1986, was an expansion pack, created to expand the content of Dragon Slayer II: Xanadu. Hydlide II: Shine of Darkness (1985) also featured a morality system. Eurogamer cites Fairlight (1985) as an early action RPG.

An important influence on the action RPG genre was the 1986 action-adventure The Legend of Zelda, which served as the template for many future action RPGs, even though it does not strictly fit the definition of later action RPGs. In contrast to previous action RPGs, such as Dragon Slayer and Hydlide, which required the player to bump into enemies to attack them, The Legend of Zelda featured an attack button that animates a sword swing or projectile attack on the screen. It was also an early example of open-world, nonlinear gameplay, and introduced new features such as battery backup saving. These elements have been used in many action RPGs since.

=== Late 1980s: Genre evolution ===
In 1987, Zelda II: The Adventure of Link implemented a more traditional RPG-esque system, with experience points and levels with action game elements. Unlike its predecessor, Zelda II more closely fits the definition of an action RPG.

Another Metroidvania-style action RPG released that year was System Sacom's Sharp X1 computer game Euphory, which was possibly the only Metroidvania-style multiplayer action RPG produced, with two-player cooperative gameplay. The fifth Dragon Slayer title, Sorcerian, was also released that year. It was a party-based action RPG; the player controls a party of four characters at the same time in a side-scrolling view. The game also featured character creation, highly customizable characters, class-based puzzles, and a new scenario system, players could choose from 15 scenarios, or quests, to play through in the order of their choice. It was also an episodic video game, with expansion disks later released with more scenarios. Falcom also released the first installment of its Ys series in 1987. While not very popular in the West, the long-running Ys series has performed strongly in the Japanese market, with many sequels, remakes and ports in the decades that followed its release. Besides Falcom's own Dragon Slayer series, Ys was also influenced by Hydlide, from which it borrowed certain mechanics such as health-regeneration.

The Faery Tale Adventure offered one of the largest worlds at the time, with over 17,000 computer screens without load times.

In 1988, Telenet Japan's Exile series debuted and was controversial due to its plot, which revolves around a time-travelling Crusades-era Syrian assassin who assassinates various religious/historical figures as well as 20th-century political leaders, The gameplay of Exile included both overhead exploration and side-scrolling combat and featured a heart monitor to represent the player's Attack Power and Armor Class statistics. Another controversial aspect of the game involved drugs (instead of potions) that increase/decrease attributes, but with side effects such as heart-rate increase/decrease or death. Origin Systems, the developer of the Ultima series, also released an action RPG in 1988, titled Times of Lore, which was inspired by various NES titles, particularly The Legend of Zelda. Times of Lore inspired several later titles by Origin Systems, such as the 1990 games Bad Blood (another action RPG based on the same engine) and Ultima VI: The False Prophet, based on the same interface.

Also in 1989, the enhanced remake Ys I & II was one of the first video games to use CD-ROM, which was utilized to provide enhanced graphics, animated cut scenes, a Red Book CD soundtrack, and voice acting. Its English localization was also one of the first to use voice dubbing. The game received the Game of the Year award from OMNI Magazine in 1990, as well as other prizes. Another 1989 release, Activision's Prophecy: The Fall of Trinadon, attempted to introduce "Nintendo-style" action combat to North American computer role-playing games.

=== 1990s: Console games and Diablo ===
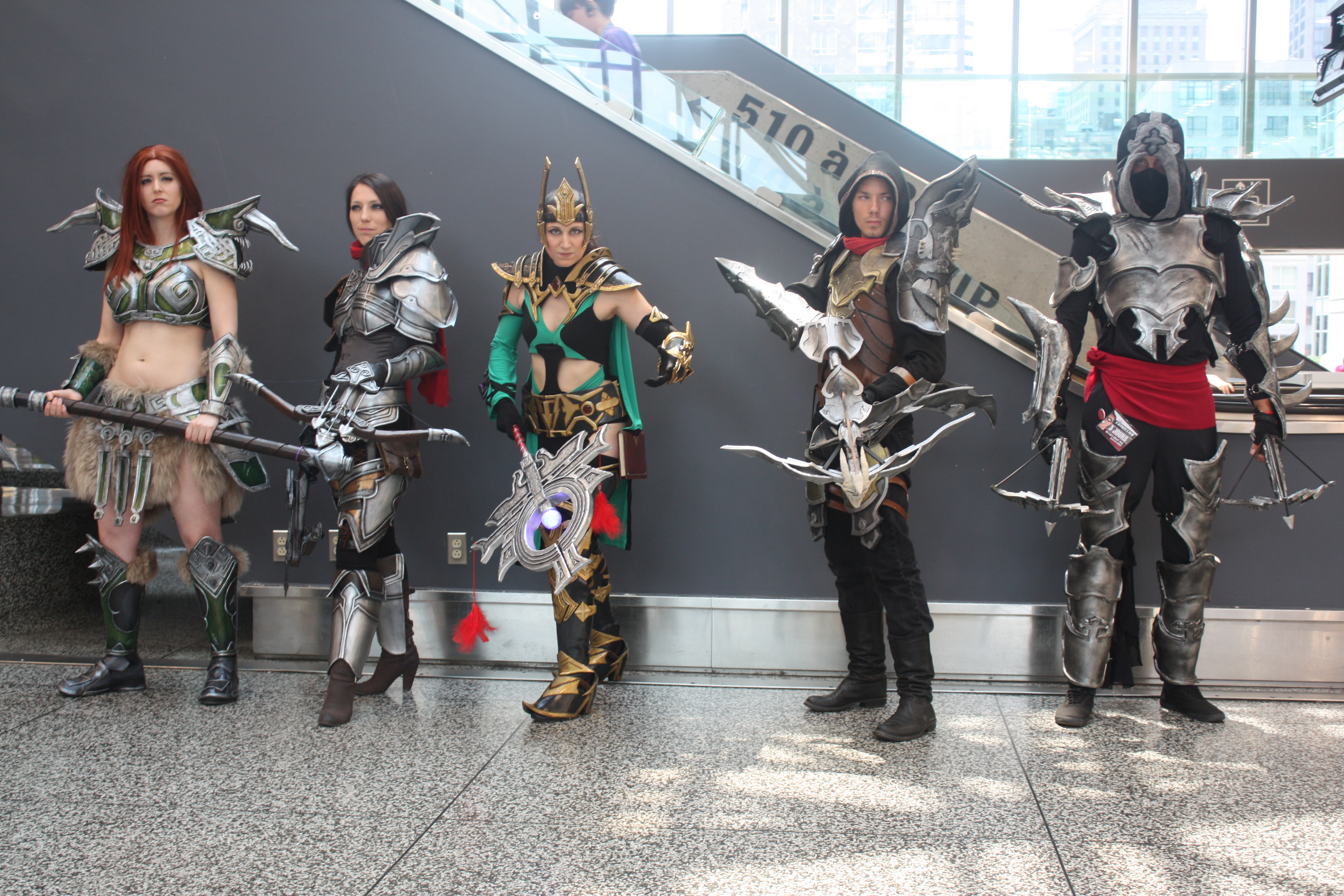
Diablo cosplay

Action RPGs were far more common on consoles than computers, due to better suitability of gamepads to real-time action than the keyboard and mouse. Early-’90s consoles refined the real-time, stat-driven formula. Though there were action-oriented computer RPGs created in the late 1980s and early 1990s, very few saw any success. Times of Lore was one of the more successful attempts in the American computer market, where there was a claimed generally negative attitude from some players towards genres combination and an emphasis on the purity of the RPG genre. For example, a survey in the 1991 issue of Computer Gaming World criticized several computer role‑playing games; including Ys, Sorcerian, Times of Lore, and Prophecy, for their resemblance to "arcade" or "Nintendo-style" action combat.

In 1991, Square released Seiken Densetsu: Final Fantasy Gaiden, also known as Final Fantasy Adventure or Mystic Quest in the West, for the Game Boy. Like Crystalis, the action in Seiken Densetsu bore a strong resemblance to that of Legend of Zelda, but added more RPG elements. It was one of the first action RPGs to allow players to kill townspeople, though later Mana games removed this feature. Arcus Odyssey by Wolf Team (now Namco Tales Studio) was an action RPG that featured an isometric perspective and co-operative multiplayer gameplay. In 1993, the second Seiken Densetsu game, Secret of Mana, received considerable acclaim, for its innovative pausable real-time action battle system, and its innovative cooperative multiplayer gameplay, where the second or third players could drop in and out of the game at any time, and did not have to join the game at the same time. The game has remained influential through to the present day, with its ring menu system still used in modern games and its cooperative multiplayer mentioned as an influence on games such as Dungeon Siege III (2011).

On PC, the genre's inflection point was Ultima Underworld (1992) which has been cited as the first RPG to feature first-person action in a 3D environment. In 1998, PC Gamer declared it the 18th-best computer game ever released, and the editors called it "Light-years ahead of their time, and still regarded as some of the best roleplaying games ever created". A poll conducted in May 2023 by GQ among a team of video game journalists listed it as the 95th-best video game of all time. The Elder Scrolls: Arena (1994), the first game in the Elder Scrolls series, was released for MS-DOS in 1994. Diablo (1996/97), Blizzard North’s click-to-move, real-time “dungeon crawl” stripped friction from combat and loot, while the launch of Battle.net alongside Diablo brought always-available online co-op. Contemporary reports noted Battle.net's explosive uptake within a week of launch. Diablo's effect on the market is significant, inspired many imitators. Its impact was such that some use the term Action RPGs exclusively to Diablo-style games. Other games influenced by Ultima Underworld include Deus Ex, Deus Ex: Invisible War, Vampire: The Masquerade – Bloodlines, and Half-Life 2.

Some action RPGs used a side-scrolling perspective typical of beat 'em ups, such as the Princess Crown and its spiritual successors, which includes Odin Sphere and Muramasa: The Demon Blade. Princess Crown had a more cartoon-like visual appeal. It still had quality visuals due to the George Kamitani style. LandStalker's 1997 spiritual successor Alundra is considered "one of the finest examples of action/RPG gaming", combined platforming elements and puzzles with an innovative storyline about entering people's dreams and dealt with mature themes.

=== 2000s: Online co-op, console brawlers, and open worlds ===
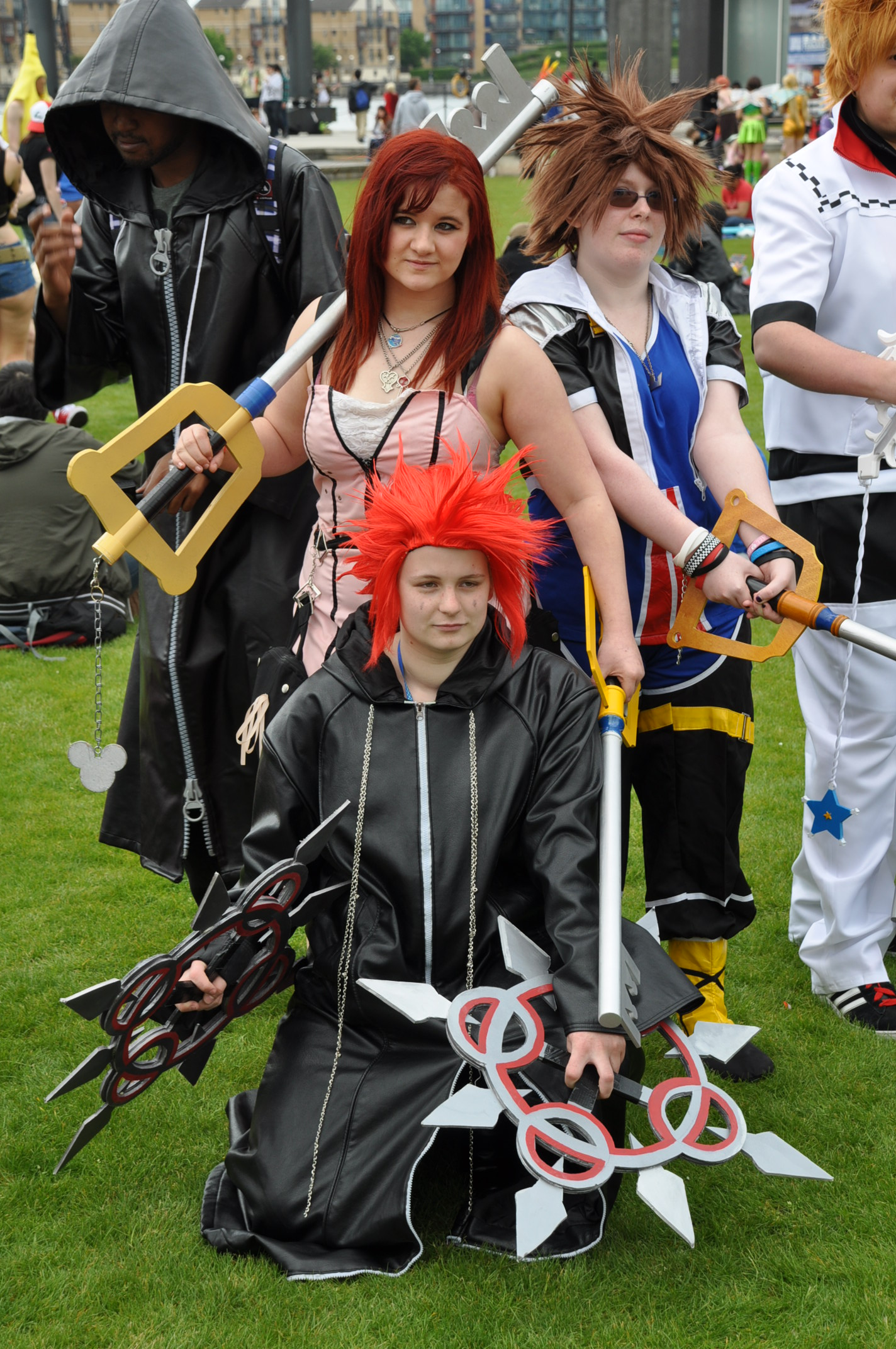
Kingdom Hearts cosplay

Right at the turn of the millennium, Diablo II (2000) scaled its predecessor's formula with class variety, seasons-like ladder play, and deeper itemization that moved millions of copies quickly and entrenched the “loot chase” as a genre pillar. Phantasy Star Online (2000) then brought real-time, instance-based ARPG play to consoles over the Internet.

The early 2000s pushed ARPGs in multiple directions. On consoles, Baldur's Gate: Dark Alliance (2001) popularized silky, pad-first hack-and-slash co-op (often called the “Snowblind engine” lineage after the developer ), and led to a wave of couch-co-op ARPGs. In the 5th Annual Interactive Achievement Awards (now known as the D.I.C.E. Awards), the Academy of Interactive Arts & Sciences awarded Dark Alliance with "Console Role-Playing Game of the Year".

Kingdom Hearts (2002), the first game in the series, was released in Japan on March 28, 2002, for PlayStation 2 continuing the trend of character action or hack and slash role-playing games. It is a crossover of various Disney properties based in an original fictional universe. This series has been critically and commercially successful. As of March 2014, the series had sold over 20 million copies worldwide.

PC saw continued Diablo-style games and fresh spins: Titan Quest (2006) and later Torchlight (2009) kept isometric, loot-centric ARPGs vibrant, with Torchlight explicitly positioned by ex-Diablo developers as a modern, fast-moving take on the formula. Meanwhile, real-time, first-person/third-person open-world ARPGs like The Elder Scrolls entries and Gothic built action combat atop simulation-heavy RPG systems, and broadened what “action role-playing” encompassed. Ultima Underworld's influence has been found in BioShock (2007), and that game's designer, Ken Levine, has stated that "all the things that I wanted to do and all the games that I ended up working on came out of the inspiration I took from Ultima Underworld". Gears of War designer Cliff Bleszinski also cited it as an early influence, and stated that it had "far more impact on me than Doom". The Witcher series began in 2007 with the release of The Witcher, and concluded with 2015's The Witcher 3: Wild Hunt. The series has three main standalone games, two expansion packs and seven spin-off games. 2007 also saw the release of Mass Effect which sold over one million units worldwide in less than three weeks after launch. The Mass Effect series had sold a total of 14 million units by July 5, 2014. Bethesda acquired the Fallout franchise from Interplay and released Fallout 3 (2008) as an action RPG in departure from previous titles.

FromSoftware's Demon's Souls (2009) emphasized hard enemies and environments, combined with risk-and-reward mechanics such as limited checkpoints, "souls" that can be collcted and consumed as experience points to increase the player's stats, or as a currency to purchase items, and player death penalties instead of an outright failure state. It also incorporated online features and allowed players to: leave messages in the overworld that can be read by other players, to temporarily join other players' sessions to assist them cooperatively, or "invade" another player's session to engage in player versus player combat. Especially after the release of its spiritual successor Dark Souls (2011) and its sequels, other action RPGs emerged in the 2010s that incorporated mechanics influenced by those of Demon's Souls, which have been popularly referred to as "Soulslike" games. Borderlands is the first game in the Borderlands series.

=== 2010s: Soulslike and global popularity ===
This decade saw continued global popularity of Action RPGs with new and old game series seeing success. Bastion developed by independent developer Supergiant Games published in 2011 sold over 3 million copies by January 2015. Bob Mackey of 1UP.com called it "the perfect mesh of game and story", and McKinley Noble of GamePro said that it "raises the visual and narrative bar for downloadable titles". Diablo III (2012) launched with a real-money auction house that Blizzard ultimately shuttered in 2014 after it undermined the loot-hunt core; the Loot 2.0 overhaul restored the series’ feedback loop and became a cautionary case study in ARPG commerce.

Capcom's Dragon's Dogma (2012) blended responsive action combat with systemic RPG depth (pawns, vocations). In 2013, Vanillaware released the fantasy beat 'em up ARPG Dragon's Crown, a spiritual successor to Princess Crown and a "deeply moving product" of Vanillaware director George Kamitani. Kamitani cites many classic RPGs as his inspiration, states in the Dragon's Crown Artworks foreword: "The motif within Dragon's Crown is all the fantasy works that has affected me until now: the PC RPG Wizardry that I first came into contact with as a student; Ian Livingstone's gamebooks; games like Tower of Druaga, Golden Axe and The King of Dragons." He also cites his early 20s work on Dungeons & Dragons: Tower of Doom as "truly something that I had aspired for". Dragon's Crown was re-released with a PS4 "Pro" edition in 2018.

Assassin's Creed, a previously action-adventure franchise of Ubisoft, shifted towards the action RPG formula, inspired by the successes of The Witcher 3 and the Dark Souls series, with its titles Origins (2017), Odyssey (2018) and Valhalla (2020). Persona 5 Strikers (2020) is an action RPG offering from the turn based Persona series. By November 2023, the game had sold over 2 million units.

Horizon Zero Dawn (2017) is an action role-playing game set in post-apocalyptic United States and played from a third-person view. In Nier: Automata (2017) avant-garde narrative coexists with high-tempo action-RPG combat. Monster Hunter was followed by Monster Hunter: World (2018) which became Capcom's best-selling title ever, and popularized cooperative, animation-driven “hunting” ARPGs. 2020 saw the popularity of live and free-to-play ARPGs: Genshin Impact (2020) fused open-world action, character progression, and gacha monetization to enormous commercial success.

=== 2020s: Continued popularity ===
The popularity of action RPGs continues to grow. In 2022, FromSoftware's Elden Ring mixed open-world exploration with Soulslike combat and systems, and swept Game of the Year honors and surpassed 25M sales within its first few years (the DLC itself set records). Avalanche Software released Hogwarts Legacy in 2023. Set in Hogwarts School of Witchcraft and Wizardry and nearby areas, the game is played from a third-person perspective. Players can customize their player character, who learns to cast spells, brew potions, and master combat abilities, and eventually develop their own special combat style. As of March 2022, the Kingdom Hearts series has shipped more than 36 million copies worldwide. As of November 2022, more than 77 million copies of Borderlands games had been shipped, with 26 million from Borderlands 2. An additional five million copies of Borderlands 3 were sold within five days of release, bringing the total series' net revenues to over US$1 billion. The Witcher series is critically acclaimed and commercially successful, selling over 75 million units by March 2023. Blizzard's Diablo IV (2023), launched as the fastest-selling title in Blizzard's history, and signaled sustained appetite for shared-world, seasons-driven ARPGs on PC and console.

New mainline entries in the long-term turn-based RPG series of Final Fantasy and Dragon Age; Final Fantasy XVI (2023) and Dragon Age: The Veilguard (2024), respectively, have been action RPGs. Diablo-style ARPGs also continue to be popular.

== Subgenres ==
=== Dungeon crawl ===
A dungeon crawl is a type of scenario in role-playing games (RPGs) in which players navigate a maze (a "dungeon"), battling various monsters, avoiding traps, solving puzzles, and looting any treasure they may find.

==== First-person dungeon crawl ====
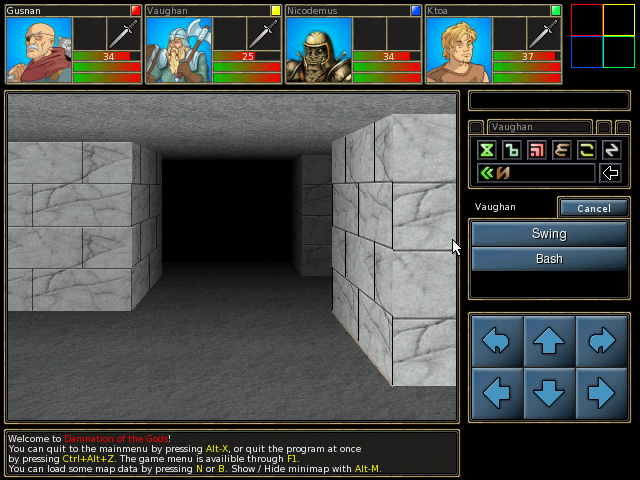
Damnation of Gods, a first-person dungeon crawl and a Dungeon Master clone

In late 1987, FTL Games released Dungeon Master, a dungeon crawler that had a real-time game world and some real-time combat elements (akin to Active Time Battle), required players to quickly issue orders to the characters, and set the standard for first-person computer RPGs for several years. It inspired many other developers to make real-time dungeon crawlers, such as Eye of the Beholder and Lands of Lore: The Throne of Chaos. Dungeons of Daggorath meanwhile for the TRS-80 Color Computer had first employed real-time combat in 1982.

Ultima Underworld: The Stygian Abyss, released in 1992, has been cited as the first RPG to feature first-person action in a 3D environment. Ultima Underworld is considered the first example of an immersive sim, a genre that combines elements from other genres to create a game with strong player agency and emergent gameplay, and has influenced many games since its release. The engine was re-used and enhanced for Ultima Underworld's 1993 seque, Ultima Underworld II: Labyrinth of Worlds. Looking Glass Studios planned to create a third Ultima Underworld, but Origin rejected their pitches. After Electronic Arts (EA) rejected Arkane Studios' pitch for Ultima Underworld III, the studio instead created a spiritual successor: Arx Fatalis. Toby Gard stated that, when he designed Tomb Raider, he "was a big fan of ... Ultima Underworld and I wanted to mix that type of game with the sort of polygon characters that were just showcased in Virtua Fighter". Ultima Underworld was also the basis for Looking Glass Technologies' later System Shock.

==== Isometric dungeon crawler ====
The 1988 Origin Systems title Times of Lore was an action RPG with an icon-based point-and-click interface. Bad Blood, another Origin Systems game from 1990, would use the same interface. The designers were inspired by console titles, particularly The Legend of Zelda, to make their interface more accessible. The 1994 title Ultima VIII used mouse controls and attempted to add precision jump sequences reminiscent of a Mario platform game, though reactions to the game's mouse-based combat were mixed. In 1997 Blizzard's Diablo was released and became massively successful. It was an action RPG that used a mouse-oriented point-and-click interface and offered gamers a free online service to play with others that maintained the same rules and gameplay. Commonly, these games used a fixed-camera isometric view of the game world, a necessity of the limitations of 2D graphics of early computers; even with 3D graphic engines, such point-and-click games are still presented from a similar isometric view, though provided options to rotate, pan, and zoom the camera to some degree. As such, these are often grouped with other "isometric RPGs".

The popularity of the Diablo series spawned such franchises like Divinity, Torchlight, Dungeon Siege and Sacred. Commonly, these games used a fixed-camera isometric view of the game world, a necessity of the limitations of 2D graphics of early computers; The Diablo series spawned many terms like reference as "dungeon crawler" "slasher RPG" "hack and slasher", the series was also heavily criticized by players and media as not a proper RPG due to focus more on enemy fights and character builds than a proper narrative and dialogue-heavy journey. After its success many other games tried to mix its influences with different structures and narratives, there are multiple games like Divine Divinity that were an attempt to have a more dialogue-heavy experience akin to the Baldurs Gate games and even older series like Falcom's Dragon Slayer/Xanadu series had Xanadu Next with similar Diablo influences. The influences also come full circle as the first Diablo game was inspired by rogue-likes Umoria and Angband and in more recent years many games in the rogue-like genre like Hades series are inspired by more classic dungeon crawler ARPGs that Diablo helped spawn.

Video showing basic point-and-click interface in an action RPG

In this sub genre there are many recent titles like Path of Exile (2013), Grim Dawn (2016), Zenonia S: Rifts In Time (2015), Book of Demons (2018), Shadows: Awakening (2018), Snack World: The Dungeon Crawl Gold (2017), Titan Quest: Anniversary Edition (2016) and its expansions Titan Quest: Ragnarök (2017) and Titan Quest: Atlantis (2019), Wolcen: Lords of Mayhem (2020) and Minecraft Dungeons (2020).

==== Point-and-click target combat ====
The prominence of Diablo 2 in the video game market and its influence on the massively multiplayer online role-playing game (MMORPG) genre later popularized the strongly used mouse-oriented point-and-click combat. While in the Diablo series this type of combat does not have a lock-on key, World of Warcraft and most MMO games use some kind of key to target an enemy, usually TAB, to lock into it, usually referred to as "tab-target". In tab-target combat, the player's character automatically performs attack animations with some kind of regular attack, while the player can focus on activating other skills and items by pressing other keys. Usually this type of combat is not heavily based on aim or hit boxes, and thus the player can hit enemies from different distances and even from afar. Some tab-target MMOs have other target options such as an "Action mode".

=== Role-playing shooter ===
Shooter-based action RPGs include Star Cruiser (1988), Strife (1996), System Shock 2 (1999), the Deus Ex series (2000 onwards) by Ion Storm, Bungie's Destiny (2014), Irem's Steambot Chronicles (2005), Square Enix's third-person shooter RPG Dirge of Cerberus: Final Fantasy VII (2006), which introduced an over-the-shoulder perspective similar to Resident Evil 4, and the MMO vehicular combat game Auto Assault (2006) by NetDevil and NCsoft. Other action RPGs featured both hack and slash and shooting elements, with the use of both guns (or in some cases, bow and arrow or aerial combat) and melee weapons, includes Cavia's flight-based Drakengard series (2003 to 2005), and Level-5's Rogue Galaxy (2005).

Other RPS games include the Mass Effect series (2007 onwards), Fallout 3 and subsequent Fallout titles (2008 onwards), White Gold: War in Paradise (2008), and Borderlands (2009). Borderlands developer Gearbox Software has dubbed it as a "role-playing shooter" due to the heavy RPG elements within the game, such as quest-based gameplay and also its character traits and leveling system. Half-Minute Hero (2009) is an RPG shooter that features self-referential humour and a 30-second time limit for each level and boss encounter. Other action role-playing games with shooter elements include the 2010 titles Alpha Protocol by Obsidian Entertainment and The 3rd Birthday, the third game in the Parasite Eve series, features a unique blend of action RPG, real-time tactical RPG, survival horror and third-person tactical shooter elements. Shooter-based RPGs include Imageepoch's post-apocalyptic Black Rock Shooter (2011), which employs both first-person and third-person shooter elements, and Square Enix's Final Fantasy XV (2016), which features both hack and slash and third-person shooter elements.

The online live service version gained a lot of popularity on the 2010s with titles such as Warframe (2013), Destiny (2014) and Destiny 2 (2017), The Division (2016) and The Division 2 (2019).

=== Soulslike ===
A Soulslike is a subgenre of action role-playing games known for high difficulty level and emphasis on environmental storytelling, typically in a dark fantasy setting. It has its origin in Demon's Souls and the Dark Souls trilogy by FromSoftware, the themes and mechanics of which directly inspired various other games. Soulslike games usually have ways to permanently improve the player character's abilities to progress further, often using a type of currency that can be earned and spent but may be lost or abandoned between deaths if not properly managed, similar to the souls in the Dark Souls series.

=== Musou ===
Dynasty Warriors is a hack and slash series developed by Omega Force and published by Koei. It requires quick moves and devastating attacks to take out massive hoards of enemies relatively quickly. Swords or other melee weapons are typically used, but projectile based weapons may be present. Combat and violence is usually emphasized above all other game or plot mechanics. A dodge mechanic may not always be present, as the player is expected to repeatedly "hack away" at their opponents. Other video games with similar gameplay like Samurai Warriors and Drakengard have created a "Musou style" subgenre of hack and slash action role playing games. The name comes from Musou gauge, used in Samurai Warriors and Musou mode, used in Dynasty Warriors. Hyrule Warriors: Age of Imprisonment is one of the latest examples of this subgenre.

=== Monster-taming game ===
A monster-taming game (also known as a monster-catcher or creature collector game, and share core mechanics such as ability to capture creatures, train them, and use them in battle against similar creatures. Many of them like Pokémon Legends: Arceus, Palworld and Pokémon Legends: Z-A have real time combat.
