= Nihon Falcom =

Japanese video game company

- A variant of the Nihon Falcom logo
- Native name: 日本ファルコム株式会社
- Romanized name: Nihon farukomu kabushiki gaisha
- Type: Public
- Traded as: TYO: 3723
- Industry: Video games
- Founded: 9 March 1981; 45 years ago
- Founder: Masayuki Kato
- Headquarters: Tachikawa, Japan
- Key people: Toshihiro Kondo (president)
- Products: List of games: (Ys; Dragon Slayer; The Legend of Heroes; Trails)
- Number of employees: 74 (2026)
- Website: www.falcom.co.jp

Nihon Falcom Corporation (日本ファルコム株式会社) is a Japanese video game developer, best known for its Ys, The Legend of Heroes, and Trails series. They are credited with pioneering the action role-playing and Japanese role-playing game genres, as well as popularizing the use of personal computers in Japan.

== History ==
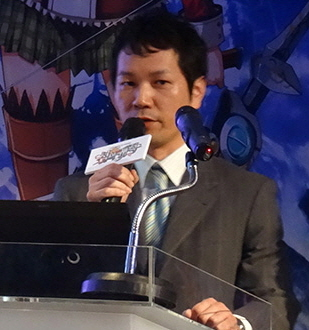
Company president Toshihiro Kondo in 2014

Nihon Falcom was founded by Masayuki Kato in 1981. They are credited with laying the foundations for the action role-playing and Japanese role-playing game genres. The word Falcom comes from the Millennium Falcon; the "n" was changed to an "m" to fit the naming trends of the time. The word Nihon, one of the native names of Japan, was added to make the name sound complete.

Falcom's first role-playing game (RPG) was Panorama Toh, released for the PC-8801 in 1983 and created by Yoshio Kiya, who would go on to create the Dragon Slayer and Brandish franchises. While its RPG elements were limited, lacking traditional statistical or leveling systems, the game featured real-time combat with a gun, bringing it close to the action RPG formula that Falcom would later be known for. Set on a desert island, the game's overworld was presented as a hex grid and featured a day-night cycle. There were also indigenous non-player characters (NPCs) whom the player could attack, talk with, or give money for items, though NPCs could choose to run away with the money. To survive on the island, the player needed to find and consume rations, as every normal action consumed hit points. The island also had traps, which required calling NPCs for help. The player could also be bit by snakes that poison and paralyze the player, requiring medicine to heal or calling for help from NPCs.

Falcom later went on to create its flagship franchises, including the Dragon Slayer, The Legend of Heroes and Ys series. The original Dragon Slayer set the template for the action role-playing genre. Dragon Slayer II: Xanadu (1985) sold more than 400,000 copies, making it the best-selling PC game up until that time.

While most of Falcom's games have been ported to various video game consoles of all generations, they have developed few non-PC video games themselves. The company's decision to develop mainly for PCs set it apart from its main rivals, Enix and Square, but limited its popularity in the Western world and its growth potential in the 1990s. By the early 2010s, the Ys series was second only to the Final Fantasy series as the largest Japanese role-playing game franchise in terms of the overall number of game releases.

In 1991, Falcom co-founded a joint-venture with Sega named Sega Falcom Inc. (株式会社セガ・ファルコム, Kabushiki-gaisha Sega Farukomu; also known as Sega Falcom Co., Ltd.) of which Sega owned 55% and Falcom 45%. Its initial purpose was to develop CD-based games for Sega's consoles to help Sega recover its share of the 16-bit console market. A series of news sections regarding Sega Falcom titled "Sega Falcom News" (セガ・ファルコム通信, Sega Farukomu Tsūshin) ran in Beep! MegaDrive from its November 1991 issue to its February 1994 issue. Games developed by the company include Popful Mail for the Mega-CD as well as Lord Monarch: Tokoton Sentou Densetsu, Dragon Slayer: The Legend of Heroes, and Dragon Slayer: The Legend of Heroes II for the Mega Drive. In 2007, Toshihiro Kondo became president of the company, succeeding Shinji Yamazaki.

Falcom was also a pioneer in video game music, with its early soundtracks mostly composed by chiptune musicians Yuzo Koshiro and Mieko Ishikawa.
