= List of role-playing video games: 2004 to 2005 =

This is a comprehensive index of commercial role-playing video games (RPGs), sorted chronologically by year. Information regarding release platform, release type, RPG subgenre, game setting, developers, publishers, and country of origin is provided where available. The table can be sorted by clicking on the small boxes next to the column headings.

This list includes all RPG subgenres, including MMORPGs, Action RPGs and Tactical RPGs. This list does not include MUDs and Roguelikes by default, unless they have an additional RPG subgenre. For standalone lists on these subgenres, see List of MUDs and List of roguelikes

== Legend ==
Video game platforms
| 3DS | Nintendo 3DS, 3DS Virtual Console, iQue 3DS | DS | Nintendo DS, DSiWare, iQue DS | GBA | Game Boy Advance, iQue GBA |
| GCN | GameCube | LIN | Linux, SteamOS | MAC | Classic Mac OS, 2001 and before |
| MOBI | Mobile phone | NGE | N-Gage | OSX | macOS |
| PS1 | PlayStation 1 | PS2 | PlayStation 2 | PSP | PlayStation Portable |
| WIN | Windows, all versions Windows 95 and up | XBOX | (replace with XB) | | |

Types of releases
| Compilation | A compilation, anthology or collection of several titles, usually (but not always) belonging to the same series |
| Early access | A game launched in early access is unfinished and thus might contain bugs and glitches or have some of the content missing |
| Episodic | An episodic video game that is released in batches over a period of time |
| Expansion | A large-scale DLC to an already existing game that adds new story, areas and additions and/or changes to the game's mechanics |
| Full release | A full release of a game that launched in early access first |
| Limited | A special release (often called "Limited" or "Collector's Edition") with bonus collector's material. Often provided to people who pre-order a game |
| Port | The game first appeared on a different platform and a port was made. The game is like the original, with few or no differences |
| Remake | The game is an enhanced remake of an original, made using a new engine and/or assets and thus containing completely new sound, graphics and possibly changes to the story and/or gameplay |
| Remaster | The game is a remaster of an original, released on the same or different platform, with (usually minor) changes to graphics, sound and/or gameplay |
| Rerelease | The game was re-released on the same platform with no or only minor changes |

Video game genres
| Action RPG | Action role-playing game | Dungeon crawl | Dungeon crawl | JRPG | Japanese-style role-playing game |
| MMORPG | Massively multiplayer online RPG | Monster tamer | Monster-taming game | MUD | Multi-user dungeon |
| Real-time | Real-time game | Roguelike | Roguelike, Roguelite | Sandbox | Sandbox game |
| Soulslike | Soulslike | Tactical RPG | Tactical role-playing game | Turn-based | Turn-based game |

== List ==
| Year | Title | Developer | Publisher | Setting | Platform | Subgenre | Series/Notes | COO |
|---|---|---|---|---|---|---|---|---|
| 2004 (EU) | A.I.M.: Artificial Intelligence Machines | SkyRiver | 1C Company | Modern | WIN | Action RPG | | |
| 2004 (JP); 2005 (NA) | Arc the Lad: End of Darkness | Cattle Call | SCEI; Namco | Fantasy | PS2 | Action RPG | Sequel to Arc the Lad: Twilight of the Spirits. | JP |
| 2004 (JP); 2005 (NA); 2006 (EU) | Atelier Iris: Eternal Mana | Gust | Gust; Nippon Ichi; Koei | Fantasy | PS2 | | | JP |
| 2004 (NA) | Blades of Avernum | Spiderweb | Spiderweb | Fantasy | MAC, WIN | | | US |
| 2004 (NA) | Baldur's Gate: Dark Alliance | Magic Pockets | DSI | Fantasy | GBA (Port) | Action RPG | Port of Baldur's Gate: Dark Alliance for PS2. Spin-off of the Baldur's Gate series. | FR/US |
| 2004 (??) | Baldur's Gate: Dark Alliance II | Black Isle | | Fantasy | Xbox, PS2 | Action RPG | Sequel to Baldur's Gate: Dark Alliance. | US |
| 2004 (NA); 2005 (PAL) | Bards Tale, The | InXile | Vivendi | Fantasy | Xbox, PS2 | Action RPG | Spoof of Bard's Tale, The for Apple II. | US |
| 2004 (JP) | Before Crisis: Final Fantasy VII | Square Enix | Square Enix | Sci-Fi; Fantasy | MOBI | Action RPG | Prequel to Final Fantasy VII. | JP |
| 2004 (DE/NA/UK) | Beyond Divinity | Larian | Ubisoft; Hip; Focus Home | Fantasy | WIN | Action RPG | Spin-off of Divine Divinity. | BE |
| 2004 (DE/NA/UK) | Beyond Divinity: Deluxe Edition | Larian | MediaMix | Fantasy | WIN (Comp) | Action RPG | Compilation of Beyond Divinity and Divine Divinity for WIN. | BE |
| 2004 (NA) | Black Isle Compilation: Part Two | Black Isle | Interplay | Fantasy | WIN (Comp) | | Compilation of Black Isle's D&D titles, minus Planescape: Torment. | US |
| 2004 (JP) | Black/Matrix 00 | Flight-Plan | | Fantasy | PS1 | Tactical RPG | Complete remake of Black Matrix Zero. | JP |
| 2004 (JP/NA); 2005 (EU) | Boktai 2: Solar Boy Django | Konami | Konami | Fantasy | GBA | | Sequel to Boktai: The Sun is in Your Hand. | JP |
| 2004 (NA/PAL) | Champions of Norrath | Snowblind | SOE | Fantasy | PS2 | Action RPG | Spin-off of the EverQuest series. | US |
| 2004 (CN) | Chinese Paladin 3 Gaiden: Wenqing Pian | Softstar Technology (Shanghai) Co., Ltd. | Softstar Entertainment Inc. | Fantasy | WIN | Action RPG | Part of The Legend of Sword and Fairy series. | CN |
| 2004 (EU) | Conan | Cauldron | TDK Mediactive Europe | Fantasy | WIN, XBX, GCN, PS2 | Action RPG | Based on the literary character Conan the Barbarian. | CZ |
| 2004 (RU); 2005 (NA) | COPS 2170: The Power of Law; Власть Закона | MiST Land | Strategy First | Post-apocalyptic; Cyberpunk | WIN | Tactical RPG | | RU |
| 2004 (JP/NA) | Custom Robo | Noise | Nintendo | Robotics | GCN | Action RPG | Part of the Custom Robo series | JP |
| 2004 (JP) | Dragon Quest | Square Enix | Square Enix | Fantasy | Mobi (Remake) | JRPG | Remake of Dragon Quest for NES. | JP |
| 2004 (JP) | Dragon Quest V: Tenku no Hanayome | ArtePiazza; Matrix | Square Enix | Fantasy | PS2 (Remake) | JRPG | Remake of Dragon Quest V: Tenku no Hanayome for SNES. Sequel to Dragon Quest IV. | JP |
| 2004 (JP); 2005 (NA); 2006 (EU/AU) | Dragon Quest VIII: Journey of the Cursed King | Level-5 | Square Enix | Fantasy | PS2 | JRPG | Sequel to Dragon Quest VII. Sequel to Dragon Quest VII. | JP |
| 2004 (NA) | Elder Scrolls, The: Arena | Bethesda | Bethesda | Fantasy | DOS (Rerel) | | Freeware rerelease of The Elder Scrolls: Arena. | US |
| 2004 (??) | Elder Scrolls Travels, The: Dawnstar | Vir2L | Vir2L | Fantasy | MOBI | | | US |
| 2004 (??) | Elder Scrolls Travels, The: Shadowkey | Vir2L; TKO | Vir2L; Nokia | Fantasy | NGE | | | US |
| 2004 (NA) | Devil Whiskey | Shifting Suns | Shifting Suns | Fantasy | WIN | | Heavily influenced by The Bard's Tale; Series debuts. | |
| 2004 (NA/EU); 2005 (JP) | Fable | Lionhead | Microsoft | Fantasy | Xbox | Action RPG | | UK |
| 2004 (??) | Fall, The: Last Days of Gaia | Silver Style | Deep Silver | Post-apocalyptic | WIN | | | DE |
| 2004 (NA/EU); 2005 (JP) | Fallout: Brotherhood of Steel | Interplay | Interplay | Post-apocalyptic | PS2, Xbox (Port) | Action RPG | Spin-off of the Fallout series. | US |
| 2004 (JP) | Final Fantasy; Final Fantasy Mobile | | | Fantasy | MOBI (Port) | JRPG | Port of Final Fantasy for NES. | JP |
| 2004 (JP/NA/EU/AU) | Final Fantasy I & II: Dawn of Souls | Square; TOSE | Square Enix | Fantasy | GBA (Port) | JRPG | Port of Final Fantasy and Final Fantasy II for NES. | JP |
| 2004 (JP) | Final Fantasy II; Final Fantasy II Mobile | | | Fantasy | MOBi (Port) | JRPG | Port of Final Fantasy II for NES. | JP |
| 2004 (JP); 2005 (NA/EU) | Fire Emblem: The Sacred Stones | Intelligent | Nintendo | Fantasy | GBA | Tactical RPG | | JP |
| 2004 (NA/EU/AU) | Forgotten Realms: Demon Stone | Stormfront; Krysalide; Zono | Atari | Fantasy | PS2, Xbox | Action RPG | | US |
| 2004 (NA/AU) | Forgotten Realms: Demon Stone | Stormfront; Zono | Atari | Fantasy | WIN (Port) | Action RPG | Port of Forgotten Realms: Demon Stone for PS2. | US |
| 2004 (JP) | Fullmetal Alchemist: Dream Carnival | Eighting | Bandai | Fantasy | PS2 | | | JP |
| 2004 (JP); 2005 (NA) | Fullmetal Alchemist 2: Curse of the Crimson Elixir | Racjin | Square Enix | Fantasy | PS2 | Action RPG | Sequel to Fullmetal Alchemist: Dream Carnival. Prequel to Fullmetal Alchemist and the Broken Angel. | JP |
| 2004 (DE); 2005 (NA) | Gothic II: Gold Edition | Piranha Bytes | JoWood; Aspyr | Fantasy | WIN (Comp) | Action RPG | Compilation of Gothic II and its expansion Gothic II: Night of the Raven. | DE |
| 2004 (JP); 2007 (NA) | Gurumin | Nihon Falcom | JP: Nihon Falcom / Flyhigh Works; NA: Mastiff; EU: 505 Game Street | Fantasy | WIN, PSP, 3DS | Action RPG | | JP |
| 2004 (NA/EU) | Harry Potter and the Prisoner of Azkaban | KnowWonder | EA | Fantasy | WIN | | | US |
| 2004 (NA/EU) | Harry Potter and the Prisoner of Azkaban | EA UK | EA | Fantasy | GCN (Port), PS2 (Port), Xbox (Port) | | Port of Harry Potter and the Prisoner of Azkaban for PC. | US/UK |
| 2004 (??) | Harry Potter and the Prisoner of Azkaban | Griptonite | EA | Fantasy | GBA (Port) | | Port of Harry Potter and the Prisoner of Azkaban for PC. | US |
| 2004 (JP/NA) | Inuyasha: The Secret of the Cursed Mask | Bandai | Bandai | Fantasy | PS2 | | | JP |
| 2004 (NA); 2005 (EU) | Jagged Alliance 2: Wildfire | I-Deal | Strategy First | Modern | WIN (Comp) | Tactical RPG | Compilation of Jagged Alliance 2 and the Wildfire mod. | DE |
| 2004 (JP/NA); 2005 (EU/AU) | Kingdom Hearts: Chain of Memories | Square Enix; Jupiter | Square Enix; Nintendo | Fantasy | GBA | Action RPG | Sequel to Kingdom Hearts. | JP |
| 2004 (NA/EU) | Knights of the Temple: Infernal Crusade | Starbreeze | TDK | Fantasy | GCN, PS2, WIN, Xbox | Action RPG | | SE |
| 2004 (JP); 2006 (NA) | Legend of Heroes III, The: Prophecy of the Moonlight Witch; The Legend of Heroes II: Prophecy of the Moonlight Witch 英雄伝説III「白き魔女」-もうひとつの英雄たちの物語- | Nihon Falcom | Namco Bandai | Fantasy | PSP (Remake) | JRPG | Remake of The Legend of Heroes III: Prophecy of the Moonlight Witch for PC98. Sequel to Dragon Slayer: The Legend of Heroes II. | JP |
| 2004 (JP) | Legend of Heroes III, The: Prophecy of the Moonlight Witch; The Legend of Heroes II: Prophecy of the Moonlight Witch 英雄伝説III「白き魔女」-もうひとつの英雄たちの物語- | ScriptArts | Taito | Fantasy | MOBI (Port) | | Port of The Legend of Heroes III: Prophecy of the Moonlight Witch for PC98. Sequel to Dragon Slayer: The Legend of Heroes II. | JP |
| 2004 (JP) | The Legend of Heroes: Trails in the Sky 英雄伝説「空の軌跡FC」 | Nihon Falcom | Nihon Falcom | Fantasy | WIN | | Start of the Trails series | JP |
| 2004 (NA/EU) | Lord of the Rings, The: The Third Age | EA Redwood Shores | EA | Fantasy | GCN, PS2, Xbox | | US | |
| 2004 (NA/PAL) | Lord of the Rings, The: The Third Age | Griptonite | EA | Fantasy | GBA | Tactical RPG | | US |
| 2004 (JP); 2005 (NA); 2006 (PAL) | Magna Carta: Crimson Stigmata; Magna Carta: Tears of Blood | Softmax | Banpresto; Atlus; 505 | Fantasy | PS2 | | Sequel to Magna Carta: The Phantom of Avalanche for PC. | JP |
| 2004 (JP); 2005 (NA/EU) | Mega Man Battle Network 5: Team ProtoMan | Capcom | Capcom | Fantasy | GBA | Action RPG | Sequel to Mega Man Battle Network 4. | JP |
| 2004 (JP/NA); 2006 (PAL) | Monster Hunter | Capcom | Capcom | Fantasy | PS2 | Action RPG | Series debuts. | JP |
| 2004 (NA) | Neverwinter Nights: Hordes of the Underdark | BioWare; Floodgate | MacSoft | Fantasy | OSX (Port) | | Port of Neverwinter Nights: Hordes of the Underdark for WIN. Expansion for Neverwinter Nights. | CA |
| 2004 (NA) | Neverwinter Nights: Platinum | BioWare | Atari | Fantasy | WIN (Comp) | | Compilation of Neverwinter Nights and its expansions. | CA |
| 2004 (NA) | Neverwinter Nights: Kingmaker | BioWare | Atari; MacSoft | Fantasy | LIN, OSX, WIN | | Neverwinter Nights premium module. | CA |
| 2004 (NA) | Neverwinter Nights: ShadowGuard | BioWare | Atari; MacSoft | Fantasy | LIN, OSX, WIN | | Neverwinter Nights premium module. | CA |
| 2004 (NA) | Neverwinter Nights: Witch's Wake | BioWare | Atari; MacSoft | Fantasy | LIN, OSX, WIN | | Neverwinter Nights premium module. | CA |
| 2004 (NA) | Neverwinter Nights: Shadows of Undrentide | Floodgate; BioWare | MacSoft | Fantasy | OSX (Port) | | Port of Neverwinter Nights: Shadows of Undrentide for WIN. | US |
| 2004 (JP) | Nightmare of Druaga, The: Fushigino Dungeon | Arika; Chunsoft | Namco | Fantasy | PS2 | | Sequel to The Blue Crystal Rod for SNES. | JP |
| 2004 (JP/NA/EU) | Paper Mario: The Thousand-Year Door | Intelligent | Nintendo | Fantasy | GCN | | Sequel to Paper Mario for N64. | JP |
| 2004 (JP/NA); 2005 (EU) | Phantom Brave ファントム・ブレイブ | Nippon Ichi | Nippon Ichi; Koei | Fantasy | PS2 | Tactical RPG | | JP |
| 2004 (NA) | Pocket Kingdom: Own the World | Sega | Nokia | Fantasy | NGE | MMORPG | | JP |
| 2004 (JP); 2005 (NA/EU/AU) | Pokémon Emerald | Game Freak | Nintendo; The Pokémon Company | Modern; Fantasy | GBA (Remake) | | Remake of Pokémon Ruby and Pokémon Sapphire for GBA. | JP |
| 2004 (JP/NA/EU/AU) | Pokémon FireRed | Game Freak | Nintendo | Modern; Fantasy | GBA (Remake) | | Remake of Pokémon Red for GB. | JP |
| 2004 (JP/NA/EU/AU) | Pokémon LeafGreen | Game Freak | Nintendo | Modern; Fantasy | GBA (Remake) | | Remake of Pokémon Green for GB. | JP |
| 2004 (JP) | Popolocrois: Adventure of the Law of the Moon | SCE | SCE | Fantasy | PS2 | | | JP |
| 2004 (JP); 2005 (NA) | Riviera: The Promised Land | Sting | Sting; Atlus | Fantasy | GBA (Port) | | Port of Riviera: The Promised Land for WSC. | JP |
| 2004 (NA/EU) | Sacred | Ascaron | Encore; Take-Two | Fantasy | WIN | Action RPG | Series debuts. | DE |
| 2004 (UK) | Sacred: Plus | Ascaron | Koch; Take-Two | Fantasy | WIN (Limit) | Action RPG | Director's cut version of Sacred | DE |
| 2004 (NA) | Shadow Vault | Mayhem | Strategy First | Post-apocalyptic; Cyberpunk | WIN | Tactical RPG | | SK |
| 2004 (JP/NA); 2005 (PAL) | Shadow Hearts: Covenant; Shadow Hearts II シャドウハーツII | Nautilus | Aruze; Midway | Historical; Fantasy | PS2 | | Sequel to Shadow Hearts. | JP |
| 2004 (JP); 2005 (NA); 2006 (PAL) | Shin Megami Tensei: Digital Devil Saga | Atlus | Atlus; Ghostlight | Fantasy | PS2 | | Spin-off of the Shin Megami Tensei series. | JP |
| 2004 (JP) | Shingata Medarot | Natsume Co., Ltd. | Imagineer | Robotics | GBA | Action RPG | Medabots | JP |
| 2004 (??) | Shining Force: Resurrection of the Dark Dragon | Amusement Vision | Sega | Fantasy | GBA (Remake) | Tactical RPG | Remake of Shining Force: The Legacy of Great Intention for GEN. | |
| 2004 (JP); 2005 (NA) | Shining Tears シャイニング・ティアーズ | Nextech; Amusement Vision | Sega | Fantasy | PS2 | Action RPG | Part of the Shining Force series. | JP |
| 2004 (EU) | Silent Storm: Gold Edition | Nival | JoWood | Sci-Fi; Historical | WIN (Comp) | Tactical RPG | Compilation of Silent Storm and Silent Storm: Sentinels. | RU |
| 2004 (EU) | Silent Storm: Sentinels | Nival | 1C Company; JoWood | Sci-Fi; Historical | WIN | Tactical RPG | Stand-alone expansion to Silent Storm. | RU |
| 2004 (RU); 2005 (UK); 2006 (NA) | Space Rangers 2: Dominators; Space Rangers 2: Rise of the Dominators; Космические рейнджеры 2: Доминаторы | Elemental | Excalibur; 1C Company; Cinemaware | Sci-Fi | WIN | Adventure/RPG/Strategy hybrid | Sequel to Space Rangers. | RU |
| 2004 (NA) | Star Wars: Knights of the Old Republic | BioWare | Aspyr | Sci-Fi | OSX (Port) | | Port of Star Wars: Knights of the Old Republic for WIN. | CA |
| 2004 (NA); 2005 (EU/AU) | Star Wars: Knights of the Old Republic II—The Sith Lords | Obsidian | LucasArts | Sci-Fi; Fantasy | Xbox | | Sequel to Star Wars: Knights of the Old Republic. | US |
| 2004 (RU); 2005 (EU) | Star Wolves; Звездные волки | Xbow | 1C Company; Excalibur; Micro Application | Sci-Fi | WIN | Tactical RPG; Real-time | Characters pilot space ships, but the game features traditional RPG elements. | RU |
| 2004 (JP); 2005 (NA); 2006 (PAL) | Stella Deus: The Gate of Eternity ステラデウス | Pinegrow | Atlus; 505 GameStreet | Fantasy | PS2 | Tactical RPG | | JP |
| 2004 (NA/EU); 2005 (JP) | Sudeki | Climax | Microsoft | Fantasy | Xbox | Action RPG | | UK |
| 2004 (JP); 2005 (NA/EU) | Suikoden IV | Konami | Konami | Fantasy | PS2 | | Sequel to Suikoden III. | JP |
| 2004 (JP); 2006 (NA) | Summon Night: Swordcraft Story 2 | Flight-Plan | Banpresto; Atlus | Steampunk | GBA | Action RPG | Sequel to Summon Night: Swordcraft Story. | JP |
| 2004 (JP) | Super Robot Wars GC | Banpresto | Banpresto | Sci-Fi | GCN | Tactical RPG | | JP |
| 2004 (JP) | Super Robot Wars MX | Banpresto | Banpresto | Sci-Fi | PS2 | Tactical RPG | | JP |
| 2004 (JP) | Tales of Rebirth | Namco | Namco | Fantasy | PS2 | Action RPG | Sequel to Tales of Symphonia. | JP |
| 2004 (JP) | Tales of Symphonia | Namco | Namco | Fantasy | PS2 (Port) | Action RPG | Port of Tales of Symphonia for GCN. Distant prequel to Tales of Phantasia. | JP |
| 2004 (JP) | Tales of Tactics | | | Fantasy | MOBI | Tactical RPG | | JP |
| 2004 (NA/EU) | Vampire: The Masquerade - Bloodlines | Troika | Activision | Modern; Fantasy | WIN | FPS/RPG | World of Darkness setting. Fails financially, marking the end of the ill-fated Troika Games. | US |
| 2004 (JP); 2005 (NA) | Virtua Quest | Sega-AM2 | Sega | Fantasy | GCN, PS2 | Action RPG | Spin-off of the Virtua Fighter series. | JP |
| 2004 (NA/EU) | Wars and Warriors: Joan of Arc | Enlight | Enlight | Historical; Fantasy | WIN | Action RPG; RTS/RPG | A planned version for the Xbox was cancelled. | HK |
| 2004 (NA) | Weird Wars: The Unknown Episode of World War II | Mirage | Strategy First | Alternate history Fantasy | WIN | Real-time | Based on a Polish '70s sitcom and the PnP RPG setting by Pinnacle. Used the same engine as Another War. | PL |
| 2004 (NA/PAL); 2005 (JP) | X-Men Legends | Raven | Activision | Sci-Fi | GCN, PS2, Xbox | Action RPG | | US |
| 2004 (JP); 2005 (NA/EU) | Xenosaga Episode II: Jenseits von Gut und Böse | Monolith | Namco; SCEE | Sci-Fi; Fantasy | PS2 | | Sequel to Xenosaga Episode I: Der Wille zur Macht. | JP |
| 2004 (TW) | Xuan-Yuan Sword: The Millennial Destiny | DOMO Studio | Softstar Entertainment | Fantasy | WIN | Action RPG | Xuan-Yuan Sword | TW |
| 2004 (JP/NA); 2005 (PAL) | Yu Yu Hakusho: Tournament Tactics | Sensory Sweep | Atari | Fantasy | GBA | Tactical RPG | | JP |
| 2005 (JP) | Angelic Vale Shinden: Ephemer Shima Kitare エンジェリックヴェール | Chrome Six | | Fantasy | WIN | Tactical RPG | | JP |
| 2005 (DE) | Atari Collection: Rollenspiele | Various | Atari | Fantasy | WIN (Comp) | | German compilation of Neverwinter Nights and its expansions, as well as Forgotten Realms: Demon Stone. | CA/US |
| 2005 (NA) | Avernum 4 | Spiderweb | Spiderweb | Fantasy | MAC, WIN | | Sequel to Avernum 3. | US |
| 2005 (NA/EU) | Bards Tale, The | InXile | Vivendi; Ubisoft; 1C Company | Fantasy | WIN (Port) | | Port of The Bards Tale for PS2 and Xbox. Reimagining of The Bards Tale. | US |
| 2005 (WW) | Battle for Wesnoth, The | N/A | | Fantasy | | Tactical RPG | Open source. | |
| 2005 (JP) | Battle Moon Wars 1 | Werk | | Fantasy | WIN | Tactical RPG | | JP |
| 2005 (RU); 2006 (NA) | Brigade E5: New Jagged Union; Бригада Е5: Новый Альянс | Apeiron | 1C Company; Strategy First | Modern | WIN | Tactical RPG; Real-time | | RU |
| 2005 (RU) | COPS 2170: The Power of Law – Gold Collection; Власть закона. Золотая коллекция | MiST Land | | Post-apocalyptic; Cyberpunk | WIN (Comp) | Tactical RPG | Compilation of COPS 2170: The Power of Law and its add-on. | RU |
| 2005 (RU); 2007 (UK) | Dawn of Magic | SkyFallen | 1C Company; Deep Silver | Fantasy | WIN | Action RPG. | RU | |
| 2005 (NA); 2006 (EU) | Dungeon Lords | Heuristic Park | DreamCatcher | Fantasy | WIN | Action RPG | Marks D.W. Bradley's disastrous attempt to re-enter the CRPG market. | US |
| 2005 (NA/EU/AU) | Dungeon Siege II | Gas Powered | Microsoft | Fantasy | WIN | Action RPG | Sequel to Dungeon Siege. | US |
| 2005 (NA/EU/AU) | Dungeons & Dragons: Dragonshard | Liquid | Atari | Fantasy | WIN | Action RPG; RTS/RPG | | US |
| 2005 (NA/EU/AU) | Fable: The Lost Chapters | Lionhead | Microsoft | Fantasy | WIN, Xbox | | Extended version of Fable: The Lost Chapters for Xbox. | UK |
| 2005 (CN) | Fantasia Sango II | UserJoy | Unistar | Fantasy | WIN | | Sequel to Fantasia Sango. | CN |
| 2005 (NA) | FATE | WildStudios | WildTangent | Fantasy | WIN | Action RPG | | US |
| 2005 (NA/EU/AU) | Freedom Force vs The 3rd Reich | Irrational | Vivendi Universal | Superhero | WIN | Tactical RPG; Real-time | Sequel to Freedom Force. | US |
| 2005 (WW) | Geneforge 3 | Spiderweb | Spiderweb | Fantasy | MAC, WIN | | Sequel to Geneforge 2. | US |
| 2005 (DE) | Gothic: Collector's Edition | Piranha Bytes | JoWood; Aspyr | Fantasy | WIN (Comp) | | Compilation of Gothic, Gothic II and Gothic II: Night of the Raven. | DE |
| 2005 (RU/NA); 2006 (EU) | Hammer & Sickle; Серп и Молот | Nival; Novik&Co | 1C Company; CDV | Sci-Fi; Historical | WIN | Tactical RPG | Set in the Silent Storm universe, following the events of the previous two games. | RU |
| 2004 (EU); 2005 (NA) | Heretic Kingdom: The Inquisition; Kult: Heretic Kingdoms | 3D People | Project Three | Fantasy | WIN | | | SK |
| 2005 (EU) | Knights of the Temple II | Cauldron | Playlogic | Fantasy | WIN | Action RPG | Sequel to Knights of the Temple: Infernal Crusade. | SK |
| 2005 (NA/EU) | Metalheart: Replicants Rampage | Akella; NumLock | DreamCatcher; Akella | Post-apocalyptic | WIN | Tactical RPG | | RU |
| 2005 (NA) | Neverwinter Nights: Diamond | BioWare | Atari | Fantasy | WIN (Comp) | | Compilation of Neverwinter Nights and its expansions. | CA |
| 2005 (NA) | Neverwinter Nights: Pirates of the Sword Coast | BioWare | Atari; MacSoft | Fantasy | LIN, OSX, WIN | | Neverwinter Nights premium modules. | CA |
| 2005 (RU); 2006 (NA) | Night Watch; Ночной дозор | Nival | CDV | Modern; Fantasy | WIN | Tactical RPG | Based on the Russian novel and film of the same name. Utilizes the Silent Storm engine. | RU |
| 2005 (NA) | Restricted Area | Master Creating | Whiptail | Cyberpunk | WIN | Action RPG | | DE |
| 2005 (EU); 2008 (NA) | Sacred Gold | Ascaron | Koch; Ascaron; Strategy First | Fantasy | WIN (Comp) | Action RPG | Compilation of Sacred and its expansion. | DE |
| 2005 (EU) | Sacred: Underworld | Ascaron | Ascaron; Take-Two | Fantasy | WIN | Action RPG | Expansion to Sacred. | DE |
| 2005 (JP) | Sakura Taisen 4: Koi Seyo, Otome | Red; Overworks | Sega | Steampunk | WIN (Port) | Tactical RPG | Port of Sakura Taisen 4: Koi Seyo, Otome for DC. Sequel to Sakura Taisen 3. | JP |
| 2005 (NA) | Shadow Vault | Mayhem | Strategy First | Post-apocalyptic; Cyberpunk | WIN | Tactical RPG | | SK |
| 2005 (NA) | Star Wars: Knights of the Old Republic II: The Sith Lords | Obsidian | LucasArts; Activision | Sci-Fi | WIN | | Sequel to Star Wars: Knights of the Old Republic. The first game released by Obsidian Entertainment, which was formed after the collapse of Black Isle Studios. | US |
| 2005 (JP) | Tears to Tiara | Leaf | Aquaplus | Fantasy | WIN | Tactical RPG | | JP |
| 2005 (JP) | Tir-nan-og V: Eternal Hitoshi ティル・ナ・ノーグV 〜悠久の仁〜 | SystemSoft | | Fantasy | WIN | Tactical RPG | Sequel to Tir-nan-og IV: King of the Valiant for WIN. | JP |
| 2005 (NA/EU) | X-Men Legends II: Rise of Apocalypse | Beenox | Activision | Superhero | WIN | Action RPG | Sequel to X-Men Legends. | CA |
| 2005 (JP) | Xanadu Next | Nihon Falcom | Nihon Falcom | Fantasy | WIN | Action RPG | Sequel to Legend of Xanadu II. | JP |
| 2005 (JP) | Ys: The Oath in Felghana | Nihon Falcom | Nihon Falcom | Fantasy | WIN (Remake) | Action RPG; JRPG | Remake of Ys III: Wanderers from Ys for MSX. | JP |
| 2005 (JP) | .hack//fragment | CyberConnect2 | Bandai | Sci-Fi | PS2 | Action RPG; MMORPG | | JP |
| 2005 (JP) | 3rd Super Robot Wars Alpha | Banpresto | Banpresto | Sci-Fi | PS2 | Tactical RPG | | JP |
| 2005 (KR); 2006 (NA/EU) | Astonishia Story | Sonnori | | Fantasy | PSP (Port) | Tactical RPG | Port of Astonishia Story. | KR |
| 2005 (JP); 2006 (NA/EU) | Atelier Iris 2: The Azoth of Destiny | Gust | Gust; Nippon Ichi; Koei | Fantasy | PS2 | JRPG | Prequel to Atelier Iris: Eternal Mana. | JP |
| 2005 (JP) | Boktai 3: Sabata's Counterattack | Konami | Konami | Fantasy | GBA | Action RPG | Sequel to Boktai 2: Solar Boy Django. | JP |
| 2005 (JP); 2006 (EU) | Breath of Fire III | Capcom | Capcom | Fantasy | PSP (Port) | JRPG | Port of Breath of Fire III for PS1. Sequel to Breath of Fire II. | JP |
| 2005 (JP) | Castle Fantasia: Elenshia Senki | Studio E-Go! | | Fantasy | PS2 | Tactical RPG; Eroge | Sequel to Castle Fantasia 2: Seima Taisen. | JP |
| 2005 (NA/PAL) | Champions: Return to Arms | Snowblind | SOE | Fantasy | PS2 | Action RPG | Spin-off of the EverQuest series. | US |
| 2005 (NA) | Chronicles of Narnia, The: The Lion, the Witch and the Wardrobe | Starwave | | Fantasy | MOBI | Tactical RPG | Based on the book and motion picture of the same name. | UK |
| 2005 (JP) | Code Age Commanders | Square Enix | Square Enix | Sci-Fi; Fantasy | PS2 | Action RPG | | JP |
| 2005 (RU); 2007 (NA/EU) | Dawn of Magic | SkyFallen Entertainment | 1C Company | Fantasy | WIN | Action RPG | | RU |
| 2005 (JP/NA/EU) | Digimon World 4 | Bandai | Bandai; Atari | Sci-Fi; Fantasy | GCN, PS2, Xbox | Action RPG | Sequel to Digimon World 3. | JP |
| 2005 (NA) | Dragon Ball Z: The Legacy of Goku 1 & 2 | Webfoot | Atari | Sci-Fi; Fantasy | GBA (Rerel) | Action adventure RPG | Re-release of Dragon Ball Z: The Legacy of Goku and Dragon Ball Z: The Legacy of Goku II for GBA. | JP |
| 2005 (JP) | Dragon Force ドラゴンフォース | 3D Ages | Sega | Fantasy | PS2 (Remake) | Tactical RPG | Remake of Dragon Force for SAT. | JP |
| 2005 (JP); 2006 (NA/EU/AU) | Drakengard 2 | cavia | Square Enix; Ubisoft | Fantasy | PS2 | Action RPG | Sequel to Drakengard. | JP |
| 2005 (JP); 2006 (NA/EU/AU) | Dungeon Lords | Heuristic Park | Square Enix; Ubisoft | Fantasy | PS2 | Action RPG | Sequel to Drakengard. | JP |
| 2005 (JP/NA); 2006 (EU/AU) | Final Fantasy IV Advance | Square | Square Enix; Nintendo | Fantasy | GBA (Remake) | JRPG | Remake of Final Fantasy IV for SNES. | JP |
| 2005 (JP) | Final Fantasy X/X-2 Ultimate Box | | | Fantasy | PS2 (Rerel) | JRPG | Re-release and compilation of Final Fantasy X and Final Fantasy X-2 for PS2. | JP |
| 2005 (JP/NA/EU/AU) | Fire Emblem: Path of Radiance | Intelligent Systems | Nintendo | Fantasy | GCN | Tactical RPG | | JP |
| 2005 (JP) | Front Mission 5: Scars of the War | Square Enix | Square Enix | Sci-Fi | PS2 | Tactical RPG | Sequel to Front Mission 4. | JP |
| 2005 (JP); 2006 (NA); 2007 (EU/AU) | Generation of Chaos | Idea Factory | NIS America; Midas | Fantasy | PSP | Tactical RPG | Generation of Chaos | JP |
| 2005 (JP) | Generation of Chaos IV 新天魔界 〜GOC IV アナザサイド〜 | Idea Factory | Idea Factory | Sci-Fi | PS1 (Port) | Tactical RPG | Port of Generation of Chaos IV for PS2. Sequel to Generation of Chaos III: Toki no Fuuin. | |
| 2005 (JP) | Generation of Chaos V 新天魔界ジェネレーションオブカオスV | Idea Factory | Idea Factory | Fantasy | PS2 | Tactical RPG | Sequel to Generation of Chaos IV. | JP |
| 2005 (JP); 2006 (NA) | Grandia III | Game Arts | Square Enix | Fantasy | PS2 | JRPG | Sequel to Grandia II. | JP |
| 2005 (JP) | Inuyasha: The Secret of the Cursed Mask | Bandai | Bandai | Fantasy | PS2 (Rerel) | JRPG | Re-release of Inuyasha: The Secret of the Cursed Mask for PS2. | JP |
| 2005 (NA/EU/AU) | Jade Empire | BioWare | Microsoft | Fantasy | Xbox | Action RPG | | CA |
| 2005 (JP); 2006 (NA/EU/AU) | Kingdom Hearts II | Square Enix | Square Enix; Buena Vista | Fantasy | PS2 | Action RPG | Sequel to Kingdom Hearts: Chain of Memories. | JP |
| 2005 (JP/NA); 2006 (EU/AU) | Kingdom of Paradise; Key of Heaven | Climax | SCE | Fantasy | PSP | Action RPG | | JP |
| 2005 (EU) | Knights of the Temple II | Cauldron | Playlogic | Fantasy | PSP | Action RPG | Sequel to Knights of the Temple: Infernal Crusade. | SK |
| 2005 (JP) | Langrisser III ラングリッサーIII | Taito | | Fantasy | PS2 (Port) | Tactical RPG | Port of Langrisser III for SAT. Prequel to Warsong. | JP |
| 2005 (JP); 2007 (NA) | Legend of Heroes IV, The: A Tear of Vermillion; The Legend of Heroes: A Tear of Vermillion 英雄伝説IV「朱紅い雫」 | Micro Vision | Bandai | Fantasy | PSP (Remake) | JRPG | Remake of The Legend of Heroes IV: A Tear of Vermillion for PC-9801. Sequel to The Legend of Heroes III: Prophecy of the Moonlight Witch. | JP |
| 2005 (NA) | Lord of the Rings, The: Tactics | EA | EA | Fantasy | PSP | Tactical RPG | | US |
| 2005 (JP/NA); 2006 (EU) | Lunar: Dragon Song | Japan Art Media | Marvelous; Ubisoft; Rising Star | Fantasy | DS | JRPG | Prequel to Lunar: The Silver Star. | JP |
| 2005 (JP/NA/EU) | Makai Kingdom: Chronicles Of The Sacred Tome; Phantom Kingdom ファントム・キングダム | Nippon Ichi | Nippon Ichi | Fantasy | PS2 | Tactical RPG | | JP |
| 2005 (JP/NA); 2006 (EU/AU) | Mario & Luigi: Partners in Time | AlphaDream | Nintendo | Fantasy | DS | JRPG | Sequel to Mario & Luigi: Superstar Saga. | JP |
| 2005 (JP/NA/EU) | Mega Man Battle Network 5: Team Colonel | Capcom | Capcom | Fantasy | GBA | Action RPG | Sequel to Mega Man Battle Network 4. | JP |
| 2005 (JP/NA); 2006 (EU) | Mega Man Battle Network 5: Double Team DS | Capcom | Capcom | Fantasy | DS (Remake) | Action RPG | Remake of Mega Man Battle Network 5. Sequel to Mega Man Battle Network 4. | JP |
| 2005 (JP); 2006 (NA/EU) | Mega Man Battle Network 6: Cybeast Falzar | Capcom | Capcom | Sci-Fi | GBA | Action RPG | Sequel to Mega Man Battle Network 5. | JP |
| 2005 (JP); 2006 (NA/EU) | Mega Man Battle Network 6: Cybeast Gregar | Capcom | Capcom | Sci-Fi | GBA | Action RPG | Sequel to Mega Man Battle Network 5. | JP |
| 2005 (JP); 2006 (NA) | Metal Saga: Sajin no Kusari | Createch | Success; Atlus | Post-apocalyptic | PS2 | JRPG | | JP |
| 2005 (JP); 2006 (NA/EU) | Monster Hunter Freedom | Capcom | Capcom | Fantasy | PSP (Remake) | Action RPG | Remake of Monster Hunter G for PS2. | JP |
| 2005 (JP) | Monster Hunter G | Capcom | Capcom | Fantasy | PS2 (Remake) | Action RPG | Remake of Monster Hunter for PS2. | JP |
| 2005 (JP); 2006 (NA) | MS Saga: A New Dawn | Bandai | Bandai | Sci-Fi | PS2 | JRPG | | JP |
| 2005 (JP/NA/EU) | Musashi: Samurai Legend | Square Enix | Square Enix | Fantasy | PS2 | Action RPG | Sequel to Brave Fencer Musashi. | JP |
| 2005 (JP) | Namco x Capcom | Monolith | Namco | Fantasy | PS2 | Action RPG / Tactical RPG hybrid | | JP |
| 2005 (JP) | Phantasy Star Generation 2 | Sega | Sega | Sci-Fi | PS2 (Remake) | JRPG | Remake of Phantasy Star II. | JP |
| 2005 (JP/NA/EU/AU) | Pokémon XD: Gale of Darkness | Genius Sonority | Nintendo | Modern; Fantasy | GCN | JRPG | | JP |
| 2005 (JP/NA); 2006 (EU/AU) | PoPoLoCrois | SCE; G-Artists | SCE; Agetec; Ignition | Fantasy | PSP (Port) | JRPG | Port and compilation of Popolocrois Monogatari and Popolocrois Monogatari II for PS1, as well as a third, new title. | JP |
| 2005 (JP) | Princess Crown | Vanillaware | Atlus | Fantasy | PSP (Port) | Action RPG | Port of Princess Crown for SAT. | JP |
| 2005 (JP/NA) | Radiata Stories | tri-Ace | Square Enix | Fantasy | PS2 | Action RPG | | JP |
| 2005 (NA); 2006 (EU/AUS) | Rebelstar: Tactical Command | Codo | Namco | Sci-Fi | GBA | Tactical RPG | | UK |
| 2005 (JP) | Rebirth Moon リバースムーン | Idea Factory | Idea Factory | Fantasy | PS2 | Tactical RPG | | JP |
| 2005 (NA) | Rifts: Promise of Power | Backbone | Nokia | Fantasy | NGE | Tactical RPG | Based on the pen-and-paper role-playing game of the same name. | US |
| 2005 (JP); 2007 (NA/EU/AU) | Rogue Galaxy | Level-5 | SCE | Sci-Fi | PS2 | JRPG | | JP |
| 2005 (JP/NA) | Romancing SaGa: Minstrel Song | Square | Square | Fantasy | PS2 (Remake) | JRPG | Remake of Romancing SaGa for SNES. | JP |
| 2005 (JP) | Sakura Taisen 3: Pari wa Moeteiru ka | Red; Overworks | Sega | Steampunk | PS2 (Port) | Tactical RPG | Port of Sakura Taisen 3: Pari wa Moeteiru ka for DC. Sequel to Sakura Taisen 2: Kimi, Shinitamou koto Nakare. | JP |
| 2005 (JP) | Sakura Taisen V: Saraba, Itoshiki Hito yo | Red; Overworks | Sega | Steampunk | PS2 | Tactical RPG | Sequel to Sakura Taisen 4. | JP |
| 2005 (JP); 2006 (NA); 2007 (EU/AU) | Shadow Hearts: From The New World | Nautilus | Aruze; XSEED; Ghostlight | Historical; Fantasy | PS2 | JRPG | Sequel to Shadow Hearts: Covenant. | JP |
| 2005 (JP) | Shinseiki Genso: Spectral Souls II 新紀幻想スペクトラルソウルズII | Neverland | Idea Factory | Fantasy | PS2 | Tactical RPG | Sequel to Shinseiki Genso: Spectral Souls. | JP |
| 2005 (JP) | Shinseiki Yuusha Taisen | Mayhem Takara | | Sci-Fi | PS2 | Tactical RPG | | JP |
| 2005 (JP) | Shin Megami Tensei: Devil Summoner | | | Fantasy | PSP (Port) | JRPG | Port of Shin Megami Tensei: Devil Summoner for SAT. Spin-off of the Megami Tensei series. | JP |
| 2005 (JP/NA); 2007 (EU) | Shin Megami Tensei: Digital Devil Saga 2 | Atlus | Atlus; Ghostlight | Fantasy | PS2 | JRPG | Sequel to Shin Megami Tensei: Digital Devil Saga. | JP |
| 2005 (JP/NA) | Shining Force Neo シャイニング・フォース ネオ | Neverland; Amusement Vision | Sega | Fantasy | PS2 | Action RPG | Part of the Shining Force series. | JP |
| 2005 (NA) | Sigma Star Saga | WayForward | Namco | Fantasy | GBA | Action RPG | | US |
| 2005 (JP/NA); 2006 (EU) | Suikoden Tactics; Rhapsodia | Konami | Konami | Fantasy | PS2 | Tactical RPG | Sequel to Suikoden IV. | JP |
| 2005 (JP) | Summon Night Craft Sword Monogatari: Hajimari no Ishi | Flight-Plan | Banpresto | Steampunk | GBA | Action RPG | Part of the Summon Night series. | JP |
| 2005 (JP) | Summon Night EX-These: Yoake no Tsubasa | Flight-Plan | Banpresto | Steampunk | PS2 | Action RPG | Part of the Summon Night series. | JP |
| 2005 (JP); 2006 (NA) | Super Robot Taisen: Original Generation 2 | Banpresto | Banpresto; Atlus | Sci-Fi | GBA | Tactical RPG | | JP |
| 2005 (JP) | Super Robot Wars Judgement | Banpresto | Banpresto | Sci-Fi | GBA | Tactical RPG | | JP |
| 2005 (JP); 2006 (EU) | The Sword of Etheria | Konami Computer Entertainment Tokyo | Konami | Fantasy | PS2 | Action RPG | | JP |
| 2005 (JP) | Tales of Breaker | | | Fantasy | MOBI | Action RPG | | JP |
| 2005 (JP) | Tales of Commons | | | Fantasy | MOBI | Action RPG | | JP |
| 2005 (JP); 2006 (EU/AU) | Tales of Eternia | Telenet Japan; Wolf Team | Namco; Ubisoft | Fantasy | PSP (Port) | Action RPG | Port of Tales of Eternia for PS1. | JP |
| 2005 (JP); 2006 (NA) | Tales of Legendia | Namco; Team MelFes | Namco | Fantasy | PS2 | Action RPG | | JP |
| 2005 (JP); 2006 (NA) | Tales of the Abyss | Namco Tales | Namco; Namco Bandai | Fantasy | PS2 | Action RPG | | JP |
| 2005 (JP) | Tales of the World: Narikiri Dungeon 3 | Alfa System | Namco | Fantasy | GBA | Tactical RPG | Sequel to Tales of the World: Narikiri Dungeon 2. | JP |
| 2005 (JP) | Tengai Makyō III: Namida | Red Ent. | Hudson Soft | Fantasy | PS2 | JRPG | Sequel to Tengai Makyō II: Manjimaru. | JP |
| 2005 (JP) | Twelve: Sengoku Fuushinden; Twelve 〜戦国封神伝〜 | Konami | | Fantasy; Historical | PSP | Tactical RPG | | JP |
| 2005 (NA); 2006 (EU/JP) | Untold Legends: Brotherhood of the Blade | SOE | SOE | Fantasy | PSP | Action RPG | Series debuts. | US |
| 2005 (JP); 2006 (NA/EU/AU) | Wild ARMs 4 | Media.Vision | SCEI; XSEED; 505 | Steampunk | PS2 | JRPG | Sequel to Wild Arms 3. | JP |
| 2004 (PAL); 2005 (NA) | X-Men Legends | Barking Lizards | Activision | Sci-Fi | NGE (Port) | Action RPG | Port of X-Men Legends for GCN, PS2 and Xbox. | US |
| 2005 (??) | X-Men Legends II: Rise of Apocalypse | Raven | Activision | Sci-Fi; Fantasy | GCN, PS2, Xbox | Action RPG | Sequel to X-Men Legends. | US |
| 2005 (??) | X-Men Legends II: Rise of Apocalypse | Vicarious Visions | Activision | Sci-Fi; Fantasy | PSP | Action RPG | Sequel to X-Men Legends. | US |
| 2005 (??) | X-Men Legends II: Rise of Apocalypse | Barking Lizards | Activision | Sci-Fi; Fantasy | NGE | Action RPG | Sequel to X-Men Legends. | US |
| 2005 (JP) | Xanadu Next | Nihon Falcom | Nihon Falcom | Fantasy | NGE | Action RPG | Sequel to Legend of Xanadu II. | JP |
| 2005 (??) | Ys III: Wanderers from Ys | Nihon Falcom | Taito | Fantasy | PS2 (Port) | Action RPG | Port of Ys III: Wanderers from Ys for PC88 and PC98. Sequel to Ys II: Ancient Ys Vanished - The Final Chapter. | JP |
| 2005 (??) | Ys IV: Mask of the Sun - A New Theory | Taito | Taito | Fantasy | PS2 (Remake) | Action RPG | Remake of Ys IV: Mask of the Sun for SNES. Sequel to Ys III: Wanderers from Ys. | JP |
| 2005 (JP/NA/EU) | Ys VI: The Ark of Napishtim | Konami | Konami | Fantasy | PS2 (Port) | Action RPG | Port of Ys VI: The Ark of Napishtim for PC. | JP |
