= The Legend of Heroes: Trails at Sunrise =

2016 video game

- Japanese logo
- Developer: UserJoy Technology
- Publisher: Nihon Falcom
- Artist: Haccan
- Series: Trails
- Engine: Unity
- Platforms: Windows, PlayStation Vita, PlayStation 4, Android, iOS, Nintendo Switch
- Release: August 31, 2016: Browser; JP: August 31, 2016 PlayStation Vita; JP: December 26, 2016 PlayStation 4; JP: February 22, 2017 Android, iOS; CHN: November 13, 2018; JP: August 27, 2019 Nintendo Switch; JP: August 27, 2019
- Genre: Role-playing

The Legend of Heroes: Trails at Sunrise, (Note: Localized as such in Trails into Reverie.) known in Japanese as Akatsuki no Kiseki, (Note: Japanese: 暁の軌) is a 2016 role-playing gacha game developed by UserJoy Technology and published by Nihon Falcom. It is a spin-off of the Trails series, itself a part of The Legend of Heroes franchise, and was first released in Japan for browsers. Trails at Sunrise was later ported to Windows, PlayStation Vita, PlayStation 4, Android, iOS, and Nintendo Switch. The PlayStation and Switch versions were discontinued in 2022.

== Gameplay ==
Trails at Sunrise features a mix of role-playing and simulation elements. Some characters were voiced in Japanese. Haccan did the character artwork. The game features cel-shaded graphics with a battle system resembling the earlier Crossbell arc. Like in other Trails games, combat is turn-based, and the player can move their characters freely on the field of battle. Management of the player's airship also plays a major role in the game.

== Setting ==
Trails at Sunrise revisits some locations seen in previous Trails games, such as Liberl and Crossbell, while introducing a new cast of characters. The two main protagonists are both bracers (Note: A member of a civilian peacekeeping and monster-hunting guild.) harking back to the original Trails in the Sky games. Additionally, Trails at Sunrise offers players the opportunity to build a party out of characters who appeared in previous Trails games. For example, as part of UserJoy's pre-release promotion campaign, users who pre-registered for a user ID and followed the game's Twitter account had Noel Seeker, who first appeared in Trails from Zero, added to their party as a bonus character. Players who pre-registered received further bonuses based on the total number of pre-registrations.

== Development ==
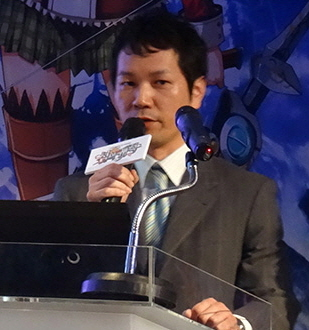
Falcom president and series producer Toshihiro Kondo

Trails at Sunrise was announced in June 2014 as a project to commemorate the tenth anniversary of the Trails series. It was initially scheduled to begin service in 2015. UserJoy Technology opened a preview site for the game in July. Though UserJoy rose to fame mainly for MMORPGs such as Angel Love Online and The Legend of Three Kingdoms Online, the early press releases did not clarify the platform for Trails at Sunrise, nor whether it would be purely single-player or if it would have some type of online multi-player functionality. Falcom president and series producer Toshihiro Kondo praised UserJoy for their knowledge of the Trails series.

=== Delay ===
Initially scheduled to be released in 2015, Trails at Sunrise was delayed for the following year, before it was ultimately released on August 31. Falcom subsequently released ports for the PlayStation Vita on December 26 and the PlayStation 4 in 2017. Beijing-based mobile games developer Changyou.com and Shanghai-based video sharing site Bilibili released a Chinese-language adaptation for smartphones under the title Xīng zhī Guǐjì (Chinese: 星之轨迹; lit. 'Trails of Stars') on November 13, 2018. A port for the Nintendo Switch was released in Japan as Akatsuki no Kiseki Mobile on August 27, 2019. The PlayStation and Switch versions of the game were removed from digital stores in June 2022.
