= The Legend of Heroes III: Song of the Ocean =

1999 video game

- North American PSP box art
- Developer: Nihon Falcom
- Publisher: Namco Bandai Games
- Series: The Legend of Heroes
- Platforms: Windows; PlayStation Portable
- Release: Windows: JP: December 9, 1999; PlayStation Portable: JP: January 12, 2006; NA: January 23, 2007
- Genre: Role-playing
- Mode: Single-player

The Legend of Heroes III: Song of the Ocean, known as The Legend of Heroes V: Umi no Oriuta (Note: Japanese: 英雄伝説V 海の檻歌, Hepburn: Eiyū Densetsu V: Umi no Oriuta; lit. "The Legend of Heroes V: A Cagesong of the Ocean") in Japan, is a 1999 role-playing video game developed by Nihon Falcom. It is the fifth game in The Legend of Heroes series, and the third and final title in the Gagharv trilogy. It was originally released for Windows and was remade for the PlayStation Portable in 2006.

== Plot ==
The game takes place in Weltluna, the third realm in Gagharv, seven years after A Tear of Vermillion and forty-nine years before Prophecy of the Moonlight Witch. It centers around Forte, Una and McBain and their quest in seeking Leone's Resonance Stones.

== Reception ==
Reception

Aggregate score
Aggregator	Score
Metacritic	PSP: 58/100

The PSP version received "mixed or average" reviews according to review aggregator Metacritic.
