= Legend of the Three Kingdoms =

Legend of the Three Kingdoms may refer to:

- The Legend of Three Kingdoms, Taiwanese video game series
- Legends of the Three Kingdoms, Chinese card game
