= Mahoro =

Mahoro may refer to:

- Mahoro, a character in InuYasha: The Secret of the Cursed Mask video game
- Mahoro Andou, the female protagonist in the Mahoromatic series
