= Dragon Slayer: The Legend of Heroes =

1989 video game

- Developer: Nihon Falcom
- Publishers: Nihon Falcom; Hudson Soft (TCD)
- Composers: Mieko Ishikawa; Masaaki Kawai
- Series: Dragon Slayer; The Legend of Heroes
- Platforms: PC-98, FM Towns, MSX2, TurboGrafx-CD, Super Famicom, X68000, Mega Drive, Windows, PlayStation, Saturn
- Release: December 10, 1989: PC-88; JP: December 10, 1989 PC-98; JP: 1990 FM Towns; JP: June 8, 1990 MSX2; JP: August 7, 1990 TurboGrafx-CD; JP: October 25, 1991; NA: December 1992 Super Famicom; JP: February 14, 1992 X68000; JP: January 8, 1993 Mega Drive; JP: September 16, 1994 Windows; KO: 1996; JP: April 25, 1997 PlayStation; JP: June 25, 1998 Saturn; JP: September 23, 1998
- Genre: Role-playing
- Mode: Single-player

Dragon Slayer: The Legend of Heroes (Note: Japanese: ドラゴンスレイヤー 英雄伝説, Hepburn: Doragon Sureiyā Eiyū Densetsu) is a 1989 role-playing video game developed by Nihon Falcom. It is the sixth game in the Dragon Slayer series and the first in The Legend of Heroes franchise.

It was originally released in 1989 for the NEC PC-8801. Within the next few years, it would also be ported to the NEC PC-9801, MSX2, PC Engine CD-ROM, X68000, Mega Drive, and Super Famicom. A Dragon Slayer: The Legend of Heroes Barcode Battler card set was also released by Epoch Co. in 1992. The PC Engine version was released in the United States for the TurboGrafx-CD, and was the only game in the series released in the US until The Legend of Heroes: A Tear of Vermillion, the PlayStation Portable remake.

In 1995, a version of the game was broadcast exclusively for Japanese markets via the Super Famicom's Satellaview subunit under the name BS Dragon Slayer Eiyu Densetsu. In 1998, a remake of The Legend of Heroes was bundled with a remake of Dragon Slayer: The Legend of Heroes II and was released for both the PlayStation and Sega Saturn.

== Reception ==
The PC Engine version was rated 25.24 out of 30 by PC Engine Fan magazine. Famitsu scored the PC Engine CD-ROM version 29 out of 40 in 1991. They later scored the Super Famicom version 29 out of 40 in 1992, and the Mega Drive version 23 out of 40 in 1994.

In its January 1993 issue, Electronic Games magazine's Electronic Gaming Awards nominated the TurboGrafx-CD version for the 1992 Multimedia Game of the Year award. They wrote it "demonstrates how far multimedia has come" since the same design team's Ys I & II and that this "mammoth quest is meticulously detailed and incorporates highly involved game play".
