= The Legend of Heroes =

Video game franchise

- Genre: Role-playing video game
- Developer: Nihon Falcom
- Publishers: JP: Nihon Falcom; NA: Xseed Games; NA: NIS America; EU: Namco Bandai Games
- Platforms: MSX, PlayStation Portable, PlayStation Vita, PlayStation 3, PlayStation 4, PlayStation 5, Nintendo Switch, Windows
- First release: Dragon Slayer: The Legend of Heroes; December 10, 1989
- Latest release: Trails in the Sky 2nd Chapter; September 17, 2026
- Parent series: Dragon Slayer
- Spin-offs: Trails

The Legend of Heroes, also known as Eiyū Densetsu (Note: Japanese: 英雄伝説) in Japan, is a series of role-playing video games developed by Nihon Falcom. First starting as a part of the Dragon Slayer series in the late 1980s, the series evolved into its own decade-spanning, interconnected series with seventeen entries, including several subseries. All games in the franchise released since 2004 are part of the Trails subseries, known as Kiseki in Japan. The most recent entry, a remake of The Legend of Heroes: Trails in the Sky SC, was released in September 2026.

== History ==
The series was created by Nihon Falcom. It began with the release of Dragon Slayer: The Legend of Heroes in 1989 as a part of Dragon Slayer franchise. It was released for various computer platforms, as well as consoles such as the Sega Genesis, Super NES, and the TurboGrafx-16. The latter would be the first and last game in the series released in English until 2005. In Japan however, the series continued with Dragon Slayer: The Legend of Heroes II, released in 1992 for a similar selection of platforms.

The third game in the series, The Legend of Heroes III (1994), later released in English as The Legend of Heroes II: Prophecy of the Moonlight Witch, dropped "Dragon Slayer" from the title. It would be followed up by The Legend of Heroes IV (1996) and The Legend of Heroes V (1999), later known outside of Japan as respectively The Legend of Heroes: A Tear of Vermillion and The Legend of Heroes III: Song of the Ocean. The three games form the "Gagharv trilogy", a subseries following a shared narrative within the same world.

After the conclusion of the Gagharv trilogy, Falcom introduced a completely new world and story with their next game: The Legend of Heroes VI: Trails in the Sky (2004). The game, later dropping the VI from the title, received two sequels: Trails in the Sky SC (2006) and Trails in the Sky the 3rd (2007). The three games made up the first ("Liberl") arc of a new subseries, known as Kiseki (軌跡) in Japanese and Trails in English. Trails would end up becoming a major success for Falcom, with every Legend of Heroes game released since being a part of it.

The next two games in the series, The Legend of Heroes: Trails from Zero (2010) and Trails to Azure (2011), form the "Crossbell" arc of the Trails narrative. The Trails of Cold Steel arc would follow, starting with The Legend of Heroes: Trails of Cold Steel in 2013 and ending with Trails of Cold Steel IV in 2018. The Legend of Heroes: Trails into Reverie is the epilogue to the Crossbell and Cold Steel/"Erebonia" arcs. The ongoing "Calvard" arc has seen three releases and began with The Legend of Heroes: Trails Through Daybreak (2021).

List of games
Series	Title	Year	Notes
Dragon Slayer	Dragon Slayer: The Legend of Heroes	1989	The first game in The Legend of Heroes series.
Dragon Slayer	Dragon Slayer: The Legend of Heroes II	1992	The final game in the Dragon Slayer subseries.
Gagharv	The Legend of Heroes II: Prophecy of the Moonlight Witch	1994	The first of the Gagharv trilogy. Known as The Legend of Heroes III in Japan.
Gagharv	The Legend of Heroes: A Tear of Vermillion	1996	Known as The Legend of Heroes IV in Japan, all numbering was removed for its English release, making it appear to be the first game in the trilogy.
Gagharv	The Legend of Heroes III: Song of the Ocean	1999	The third and final game of the Gagharv trilogy. Known as The Legend of Heroes V in Japan.
Trails	The Legend of Heroes: Trails in the Sky	2004	The first game of the Trails sub-series and the first of the Liberl arc. Originally released as The Legend of Heroes VI.
Trails	The Legend of Heroes: Trails in the Sky SC	2006	
Trails	The Legend of Heroes: Trails in the Sky the 3rd	2007	The final part of the Liberl arc.
Trails	Ys vs. Trails in the Sky	2010	Crossover fighting game containing characters from the Ys and Trails series.
Trails	The Legend of Heroes: Trails from Zero	2010	The first part of the Crossbell arc.
Trails	The Legend of Heroes: Trails to Azure	2011	The final part of the Crossbell arc.
Trails	The Legend of Nayuta: Boundless Trails	2012	Action role-playing spin-off.
Trails	The Legend of Heroes: Trails of Cold Steel	2013	The first part of the Erebonia arc.
Trails	The Legend of Heroes: Trails of Cold Steel II	2014	
Trails	The Legend of Heroes: Trails at Sunrise	2016	Gacha game developed by UserJoy Technology.
Trails	The Legend of Heroes: Trails of Cold Steel III	2017	
Trails	The Legend of Heroes: Trails of Cold Steel IV	2018	The final part of the Erebonia arc.
Trails	The Legend of Heroes: Trails into Reverie	2020	The epilogue to both the Crossbell and Erebonia arcs.
Trails	The Legend of Heroes: Trails Through Daybreak	2021	The first part of the Calvard arc.
Trails	The Legend of Heroes: Trails Through Daybreak II	2022	
Trails	The Legend of Heroes: Trails Beyond the Horizon	2024	

== Manga and anime ==
A Dragon Slayer: The Legend of Heroes original video animation was released in 1992, loosely based on the story of the first game. In 1997, it was dubbed into English by Urban Vision and was released onto VHS in North America. In 2009, three volumes of a Trails in the Sky manga were published in Japan by Kadokawa Shoten, which was followed next year by a sequel, Trails from Zero: Pre-Story, published by ASCII Media Works. Two original video animation anime episodes of Trails in the Sky were respectively released in October 2011 and January 2012. A 12-episode anime series set in the Trails universe and produced by Tatsunoko Production, The Legend of Heroes: Trails of Cold Steel – Northern War, aired in early 2023.
