= New Game =

New Game may refer to:

- New Game, a term used in video games indicating the player starting a game from the beginning
  - New Game Plus, a video game mode which is typically unlocked after completing a video game, allowing the player to start a new game with certain stats or equipment carried over from previous play sessions
- New Game!, a Japanese manga series by Shōtarō Tokunō
- New Game (Tempo album), an album by Tempo
- The New Game, an album by Mudvayne
- NewGame Software (a.k.a. Elemental Games), Russian game development company
