= Wizards & Warriors (2000 video game) =

2000 role-playing video game

- Cover art by Keith Parkinson
- Developer: Heuristic Park
- Publisher: Activision
- Designers: David W. Bradley, Nathan Cheever
- Composer: Steve Miller
- Platform: Microsoft Windows
- Release: NA: October 4, 2000; EU: October 6, 2000; AU: 2000
- Genre: Role-playing video game
- Mode: Single-player

Wizards & Warriors is a role-playing video game for Microsoft Windows designed by David W. Bradley.

== Gameplay ==
Gameplay is similar in style to Bradley's earlier Wizardry games. Players control a party of characters through a first-person perspective and fight turn-based combats. Outside of combat, the game is real-time. Characters can join guilds that give exclusive quests, and each character maintains their own individual quest log. Guilds also allow characters to switch classes. Characters can switch classes as many times as they like but can not return to a class once they change from it.

== Development ==
Development began in 1996 and lasted four years. Bradley initially reported the game would have a system that allowed players to choose between real-time and turn-based combat, though this was later abandoned. Competitive multiplayer was also planned based on the guild system, though this, too, was removed.

== Reception ==
Reception

Aggregate score
Aggregator	Score
Metacritic	70/100

Review scores
Publication	Score
AllGame	3.5/5
CNET Gamecenter	7/10
Computer Games Strategy Plus	2.5/5
Computer Gaming World	3/5
EP Daily	4.5/10
Game Informer	5/10
GameRevolution	C
GameSpot	7/10
GameSpy	68%
GameZone	7.5/10
IGN	8.4/10
Next Generation	2/5
PC Gamer (US)	74%

The game received "average" reviews according to the review aggregation website Metacritic. Sam Derboo of Hardcore Gaming 101 wrote that it "feels like Bradley's alternative Wizardry 8". In comparing the two games' dungeons, Derboo said the dungeons of Wizards & Warriors are more complex. Andrew Seyoon Park of GameSpot wrote that the game seems to be unimpressive at first, perhaps because of its long development, but provides "many hours of exploration and character building". Tal Blevins of IGN complimented the game's graphics and voice acting, though he wrote that the controls can be annoying. Blevins concluded, "If you like old-school RPGs, you'll fall in love with Wizards & Warriors." Jonathan Houghton of The Adrenaline Vault likened it to EverQuest, saying that the game's unoriginal storyline is compensated for by its depth and longevity. In criticizing the game's controls, graphics, and story, Will Lally and Tina Haumersen of GameSpy wrote, "Aside from some nostalgia value, there is nothing to recommend this game." Doug Trueman of NextGen wrote, "What might have been a decent RPG a couple of years ago can't compete today with the likes of Diablo II and Icewind Dale." Brian Wright of GamePro wrote, "RPG fans looking for a change of pace from Baldur's Gate II and who are willing to overlook a few flaws may want to give Wizards & Warriors a chance." (Note: GamePro gave the game three 3.5/5 scores for graphics, control, and fun factor, and 4/5 for sound.)
