= Fantasia Sango =

Taiwanese video game series

- Anime key visual

幻想三国誌 (Gensō Sangokushi)
- Genre: Fantasy, supernatural
- Video game
- Developer: UserJoy Technology
- Publisher: UserJoy Technology
- Genre: RPG
- Platform: Microsoft Windows
- First release: Fantasia Sango; 2003
- Latest release: Fantasia Sango 5; 2018
- Anime television series

Fantasia Sango - Realm of Legends
- Directed by: Shunsuke Machitani
- Written by: Masashi Suzuki
- Music by: Tsutomu Tagashira
- Studio: Geek Toys
- Licensed by: Crunchyroll: HK/TW: Medialink
- Original network: BS12
- Original run: January 11, 2022 – March 29, 2022
- Episodes: 12

Chinese name
- Traditional Chinese: 幻想三國誌
- Simplified Chinese: 幻想三国志
Transcriptions
Standard Mandarin
- Hanyu Pinyin: Huànxiǎng Sānguózhì
- Wade–Giles: Huan'hsiang Sankuochih

Japanese name
- Kanji: 幻想三国誌
- Hiragana: げんそうさんごくし
Transcriptions
- Romanization: Gensō Sangokushi

Fantasia Sango is a role-playing video game series developed and published by UserJoy Technology. A total of six games in the franchise have been released since 2003; while the latest installment, Fantasia Sango 5, was made available in 2018. An anime television series produced by Geek Toys aired from January to March 2022.

== Synopsis ==
=== Setting ===
The game is set in the Three Kingdoms era, when various warlords and their armies attempt to conquer and unify the nation, as well as combining the Romance of the Three Kingdoms, one of the Four Great Classical Novels.

=== Plot ===
The Three Kingdoms era in China was full of strife and war. Warlords and their armies were at each other's throats in attempts to conquer and unify the nation under their sole control. This conflict is noticed by the Wangliang King, the monstrous sovereign of evil spirits. His aim is to prolong the conflict and ultimately destroy humanity.

To fight against the evil Wangliang King and his cronies, an organization called Tianyuan forms anti-Wangliang armies. They are on missions to stop the Wangliang King. However, when the sixth anti-Wangliang Corps members are all killed, a new Corps is created from a band of adventurers who can be best described as hooligans.

== Characters ==
Yìng Jǐ (應幾, Ōki)
Voiced by: Kensho Ono
Xiǎo Líng (小霊, Shōrei)
Voiced by: Hisako Kanemoto
Xún Qiáo (洵喬, Shunkyō)
Voiced by: Mai Nakahara
Dīng Yán (丁研, Teiken)
Voiced by: Makoto Furukawa
Àixīn Chátǒng (愛心茶桶, Aishin Chaoke; Tea caddy of Love)
Voiced by: Jun Fukushima
Luózhī Nǚ (羅織女, Rashokujo)
Voiced by: Sayaka Ōhara

== Development and release ==
Release timeline
| 2003 | Fantasia Sango |
2004
| 2005 | Fantasia Sango 2 |
2006
| 2007 | Fantasia Sango 3 |
| 2008 | Fantasia Sango 4 |
| 2008 | Fantasia Sango 4 Fragment |
2009
2010
2011
2012
2013
2014
2015
2016
2017
| 2018 | Fantasia Sango 5 |

Fantasia Sango is a video game series developed and published by Taiwanese video game developer UserJoy Technology. The series was introduced in 2003 following the release of the first installment of the franchise, when the sixth game, titled Fantasia Sango 5, released on August 15, 2018.

== Anime ==
An anime television series was announced on July 30, 2021. It is produced by Geek Toys and directed by Shunsuke Machitani, with Shinpei Nagai serving as assistant director, Masashi Suzuki in charge of series scripts, CSPG and Tetsutarō Yui designing the characters, and Tsutomu Tagashira composing the series' music. The series was set to premiere in October 2021, but was delayed due to "various circumstances", and eventually aired from January 11 to March 29, 2022, on the Anime 26 programming block on BS12. The opening theme song is "Enishi", performed by Machico, while the ending theme song is "Uso" (嘘; 'Lies'), performed by Lacco Tower. Funimation licensed the series outside of Asia under the title Fantasia Sango - Realm of Legends, while Medialink licensed the series for streaming in Hong Kong, Taiwan and Macau.

== Reception ==
The franchise has sold over two million copies as of February 2025.
