= Parthian Kings =

1983 video game

- Developer: The Avalon Hill Game Company
- Publisher: The Avalon Hill Game Company
- Designer: David W. Bradley
- Platforms: Apple II, Commodore 64
- Release: 1983
- Genre: Turn-based strategy
- Modes: Single-player, multiplayer

Parthian Kings is a 1983 video game published by The Avalon Hill Game Company for the Apple II and Commodore 64. It was designed by David W. Bradley.

== Gameplay ==
Parthian Kings is a game in which the King has died, and the player competes with opponents to control the crown.

== Reception ==
Curtis Edwards reviewed the game for Computer Gaming World, and stated that "As a good example of the new crop of military games with a fantasy setting, PK has those features which should insure that you will continue to play it for a long time to come."
