= CyberMage: Darklight Awakening =

1995 video game

CyberMage
- Developer: Origin Systems
- Publisher: Electronic Arts
- Producer: Warren Spector
- Designer: David W. Bradley
- Programmer: David W. Bradley
- Artist: Chris Appel
- Writer: David W. Bradley
- Composers: Cinco Barnes; Evan Brandt; Steve Miller
- Platform: MS-DOS
- Release: Q3/Q4 1995
- Genres: First-person shooter, role-playing
- Mode: Single-player

CyberMage: Darklight Awakening is a cyberpunk first-person shooter game with role-playing elements designed by David W. Bradley. It was created by Origin and released by Electronic Arts in 1995. The game is characterized by a dark, heavy atmosphere.

== Plot ==
Set in the year 2044, the game features a world ruled by corporations and groups of anti-corporation rebels. The corporations, faced with the rebellion and competition among themselves, start working on implant products that lead to hybrid humans.

The game's protagonist player wakes up in a bio-gen tube in a strange suit, with a gem implanted in his forehead. The gem is the Darklight, a stone of magical power. After hearing gunshots and explosions, the character crawls out of the tube to find the aftermath of the battle generated by those trying to find him. Amnesiac and disorientated, the character seeks to understand what his true identity is. He discovers that has been experimented upon by the SARCorp corporation, and he seeks revenge for his mistreatment.

== Development ==
Designer David W. Bradley said he wrote the game to learn 3D technology.

== Reception ==
Reception

Review scores
Publication	Score
Next Generation	3/5
Computer Game Review	70/61/62

Jeffrey Adam of GameSpot rated it 76/100 and wrote that the game, which initially seems like a generic Doom clone, improves upon the formula by adding usable vehicles and forcing strategic use of power-ups. A reviewer for Next Generation, however, argued that these elements are not enough to make the game more than just another Doom clone. He gave the game 3 out of 5 stars, summarizing that "CyberMage has great graphics, beautiful sound, digitized video, and a detailed, entertaining storyline. It's too bad that, for all that, it still doesn't stand above the rest of the first-person shooters that clog software store shelves." Martin E. Cirulis Computer Gaming World rated it 3.5/5 stars and called it "a slick and enjoyable action game" that does not make enough use of its comic book styling. In a capsule review, PC Magazine called it fun but criticized the controls.
