= Angels Online =

2006 video game

Angels Online / Angel Love Online
- cover of the PlayStation 3 version
- Developer(s): UserJoy Technology
- Publisher(s): Q Entertainment
- Platform(s): Microsoft Windows; PlayStation 3 PlayStation 4
- Release: Microsoft Windows: SEA: June 2006; JPN: December 2006; NA: December 2007; PS3: JPN: 25 September 2008; PS4: JPN: 2022
- Genre(s): MMORPG
- Mode(s): Online multiplayer

Angels Online or Angel Love Online (ALO; simplified Chinese: 天使之恋; traditional Chinese: 天使之戀; pinyin: Tiānshǐ Zhī Liàn) is a free-to-play PC and PlayStation 3 2D massively multiplayer online role-playing game developed by UserJoy Technology in Taiwan, and published by Q Entertainment. PlayStation 4, PlayStation Vita and Smartphones ports were announced in May 2016.

The Windows version was released in Taiwan in June 2006. A Japanese version of the game was released in December 2006. The PlayStation 3 version was released, on the Japanese PlayStation Store, on September 25, 2008. It's free to download and uses the same pay-per-item model as its PC counterparts.

== Gameplay ==
Every player starts in the Angel Lyceum, a college to train Little Angels (the players) to become Angel Protectors to guard Eden against Lucifer (requirement). Once the player finishes the tutorial, they are teleported to the campus of the Lyceum where they can accumulate student credits on campus by doing lessons (composed of either defeating a certain number of a monster or collecting/manufacturing a certain amount of an item). The student credit's primary purpose is to determine whether a student can now graduate or attend the Top Student Training. When a player graduates they become an Angel Protector and choose a faction and city.

=== Job System ===
There are 14 classes available in Angels Online. Each player can at any one time have a maximum of 6 different skills, with skills maxing out at level 380. All the classes are divided into one of the following systems - Fighting, Magic or Production. Players can also change their skills by talking to the Skill Angel (there are certain exceptions). Due to this, everyone's character can be truly unique. The only thing to take into account before changing a skill is how the two skills match.

The game has a unique double class and skill system. Players are able to change or match skills after having chosen a class, which helps make characters distinctive. Different classes are able to have the same skills. For example, a character from the fighting class is able to have the magic skill. However, some special skills cannot be matched with each other, such as the chaos and the earth skills.

A skill may be leveled up by using it, but can never be higher than the character's level, which maxes out at level 380. Players can change skills after reaching level 20, but need a special item called a skill crystal to do so.
