= Knights of the Temple: Infernal Crusade =

2004 video game

- Windows cover art
- Developer: Starbreeze Studios
- Publisher: TDK Mediactive Europe
- Producer: Hans Andersson
- Designer: Mikael Lindgren
- Programmers: Fredrik Olén; Magnus Högdahl; Erik Olofsson; Jesse Andersson
- Artists: Per Gullarp; Fredrik Jansson
- Writers: Nick Kyriakidis; Mikael Säker
- Composer: Gustaf Grefberg
- Platforms: GameCube; Windows; Xbox; PlayStation 2
- Release: GameCube: EU: 19 March 2004; Windows & Xbox: EU: 8 April 2004; PlayStation 2: EU: 4 June 2004
- Genres: Action-adventure, hack and slash
- Modes: Single-player, multiplayer

Knights of the Temple: Infernal Crusade is an action-adventure video game developed by Starbreeze Studios and published by TDK Mediactive Europe. It was released for GameCube, Windows, Xbox and PlayStation 2 exclusively in Europe in 2004. The ingame soundtrack was composed by Gustaf Grefberg with additional music provided by Within Temptation. A sequel, Knights of the Temple II, was released in 2005.

== Gameplay ==
Knights of the Temple is a dynamic camera third-person hack and slash game set in the medieval times. Players take hold of various medieval weapons from axe, mace, sword, to mastering archery. These weapons have their own combos, damage, and attack speed with various Divine Powers and Special Attacks. Using the bow will let you play in first-person. Right from the first hack, relentless batches of enemies has to be dispatched with ever increasing degrees of stylish violence, doors to be unlocked, keys to be found and the occasional puzzle to be solved.

The Xbox version of the game had online support via Xbox Live which included the ability to download content such as new maps and also featured online leaderboards. Knights of the Temple is now supported on the replacement online servers for the Xbox called Insignia. The game got three DLC levels, "Limbo Macabre", "Cavern of Doom" and "For Whom The Bell Tolls".

== Plot ==
The player character Paul de Raque is a Templar knight on his first Crusade, to stop the end of the world by fighting his way through the sombre gloom of European monasteries and villages to the colourful bazaars and powerful bastions of the crusader castles under the blazing sun of the Holy Land and by entering the realms of hell and face his worst nightmares.

An evil Bishop has abducted Adelle, a mysterious young woman with divine powers and Paul's beloved childhood friend. With his entourage of disciples and their captive Adelle he embarks on an Unholy Crusade, moving along the initial routes of the historic holy wars. By misusing Adelle's powers against her he plans to complete the Unholy Circle and to perform dark rituals at sacred places to desecrate them. This way he intends to eventually unlock and gain access to the Gateway to Hell.

Paul finds upon him the tough task of starting a mission to uncover the Evil Conspiracy, to interrupt the Unholy Circle and to prevent the Evil Bishop from fulfilling his plan. Only by saving Adelle can he save the world from Evil.

In the final confrontation with evil, the powers of hell have been unleashed and the corrupt bishop has gained limitless powers. Paul fights him and his henchmen, resurrecting countless of evil minion where Paul struggles to fight. Eventually the bishop was defeated and thrown into hell, and Paul, although weak and wounded, saved the world from darkness. He then brings Adelle home to her mother where they say that Paul's victory was the will of God, something to which Adelle agrees. However, whilst Paul and her mother look away, Adelle's eyes turn black, indicating that she has been possessed by a demon.
