= Space Rangers (video game) =

2002 space trading and combat simulator video game

- Russian cover art
- Developer: Elemental Games
- Publishers: RU: 1C Company; NA/EU: Micro Application
- Series: Space Rangers
- Platform: Microsoft Windows
- Release: RU: December 20, 2002; NA: June 11, 2004; EU: June 17, 2004
- Genre: Turn-based space trading and combat simulator
- Mode: Single-player

Space Rangers (Note: Russian: Космические рейнджеры, romanized: Kosmičeskije rejndžery) is a multi-genre (turn-base strategy, text quest, arcade) computer game by the Russian company Elemental Games, released by 1C Company in 2002. It is critically acclaimed and popular in its home country, Finland and parts of Eastern Europe, although not so popular elsewhere due to lack of marketing. In 2004, 1C Company published a sequel, Space Rangers 2: Dominators.

The game is dynamic and open-ended in a fashion that has been compared to Elite and Star Control 2. Trade prices on planets follow supply and demand, the wars are ongoing non-scripted conflicts, computer-controlled ships have individual capabilities, goals and relations, etc. There are even several ways to complete the storyline. The games have turn-based space travel and combat, optional shoot 'em up sequences and occasional bits of text adventure. This game was not released in America in its own box, but in some special edition containers of Space Rangers 2: Rise of the Dominators.

== Plot ==
In Space Rangers, a relatively peaceful interstellar coalition is invaded by a powerful enemy; the organic warships of the Klissans. The player is a Ranger, one of a group of non-military volunteers who are given small ships, free rein and the task of helping to battle, understand and ultimately defeat the menace.

=== Background ===
Long ago, the now wise and peaceful Gaal race was very aggressive and was creating a huge number of colonies. Due to large space distances it created a hyperjumper which could make holes in the galaxy. Soon one of the colonies met with the Klissan fleet. Although Gaal colony ships tried to communicate with these Klissan ships they failed to do so and were destroyed. Soon Makhpella, the mothership of all Klissans and Klissan fleet, invaded all outer Gaal colonies. The Gaal colony fleet was completely helpless and in order to save the original Gaal territories and the Gaal motherland itself from invasion, they decided not to jump back which would have given the Makhpella an opportunity to trace their route, but to blow up the remaining other colonies using the hyperjumper instead.

Not very long ago, everything was started by a Peleng captain called Rachekhan, one of the commanders of the Peleng fleet. He was thrown out of the fleet and became a pirate. Since he had access to secret documents and weaponry he stole a hyperjumper. While travelling with it he met Makhpella. It considered Rachekhan's pirate fleet an enemy and started chasing it. During this chase, Rachekhan and the Klissan fleets went through sectors colonized by the interstellar coalition which enabled Makhpella to spot the IC sectors, gaining knowledge of its locations, and identify all IC races as foes. So the war started.

=== Races ===
Space Rangers features 6 races in total: the Interstellar Coalition races and the Klissans. The Interstellar Coalition consists of 5 races: Maloqs, Pelengs, Humans, Faeyans and Gaals. The Klissans are the new and unresearched form of life.

Maloq
The Maloq race is very strong physically, but mentally weak. They are physically very big and eat a lot of food. Their equipment is the cheapest but it is also the most delicate, and deteriorates much quicker than other races'. The race is named after the C standard library function malloc.

Peleng
The four handed Pelengs are usually very artful and Peleng criminals are the most successful. Also Pelengs have the strongest intelligence agency called "Dzuhallag". Peleng equipment is the 2nd cheapest and the 2nd most delicate.

Human
Humans are the best economists. If not for the humans there would be no unified interstellar currency called "credits". Human equipment is in the middle of the spectrum for both price and robustness.

Faeyan
Faeyans are very good technicians and scientists. Faeyans are hermaphrodites. Their equipment is the 2nd most expensive, and 2nd only in robustness.

Gaal
The three eyed Gaals are leading philosophers and scientists. This race is the wisest compared to the other Interstellar Coalition races. Their equipment is the most expensive and the most robust.
