= Space Rangers 2: Dominators =

2004 video game

Space Rangers 2
- Developer: Elemental Games
- Publishers: RU: 1C Company; EU: Excalibur Publishing; NA: Cinemaware Marquee
- Platform: Windows
- Release: RU: November 25, 2004; EU: June 17, 2005; NA: March 27, 2006
- Genres: Text adventure, real-time strategy, space trading and combat simulator, turn-based strategy, shoot 'em up, role-playing game, third-person shooter
- Mode: Single-player

Space Rangers 2: Dominators (Russian: Космические рейнджеры 2: Доминаторы), released in North America with the subtitle Rise of the Dominators, is a multi-genre science fiction computer game developed by Elemental Games for Windows and first published in 2004 by 1C Company. The player takes the role of a spaceship pilot, and may explore, trade, engage in space and ground-based combat, and undertake various types of missions. Space Rangers 2 is the sequel to the 2002 computer game Space Rangers.

== Setting ==
Space Rangers 2 is set in the year 3300. Sentient combat robots known as Dominators are attacking the five civilizations of the Coalition: the humans, the Maloqs, the Pelengs, the Faeyans, and the Gaalians. There are three Dominator types, each at war with each other: the Blazeroids, the Kelleroids, and the Terronoids. The player begins the game as a trainee member of the Space Rangers – a corps of pilots charged with defending the galaxy from the Dominators.

== Gameplay ==
Space Rangers 2 is a hybrid game with multiple game types of gameplay. Players explore a randomly generated galaxy, with each sector featuring multiple stars and planets. This leads to a universe with hundreds of planets, each with their own economy, government, and opinion of the player. The main goal of the game is to defeat the three command units of the titular Dominators, though the game allows the player to ignore the main quest in favor of exploration, trade, and other sidequests. The Dominators are much more powerful than the player at the start of the game, forcing the player to evade them, while pursuing smaller jobs to gain wealth, equipment, and experience.

The game's multiple systems are compared to other multi-genre games such as Pirates! or Star Control II. The player begins by selecting an alien race and a profession, and is dropped into a dynamic open universe to explore. Space travel is seen from a top-down viewpoint, with movement utilizing a turn-based system measured in solar days. The game also includes a 3D real-time strategy engine for planetary battles, where the player can take control of any unit to shift gameplay to that of a third-person shooter. The player can also pursue enemies into space, playing an arcade-style shooter mode, where players use the keyboard to maneuver and fire in an action sequence. Players can also survey planets for valuables by launching probes, with some planets triggering text-based quests similar to text adventure games.

The planet encounters can initiate several types of missions, such as hunting pirates, delivering contraband goods, or performing a covert operation against another alien race. The player can perform these missions to earn wealth, to buy bigger ships, improved weapons and equipment, or even maps that unlock new sectors of the galaxy. Players can also earn wealth through a trading system, with the markets for goods changing dynamically due to supply and demand. It is also possible to earn wealth through piracy and looting, which risks damaging relations with other aliens and planets, eventually provoking attacks on sight.

== Development ==
Space Rangers 2 was developed by Elemental Games in Vladivostok, with a team of 15 developers working for around a year and a half. The Elemental Games team had a conflict with management in 2004, with several members forming a new company called Katauri Interactive.

Elemental Games' brand owner and programmer, Aleksey Dubovoy, continued supporting the original game up until 2007, which is when Space Rangers 2: Reboot was released in Russia. This was the last update for the series from Elemental Games.

== Release ==
Space Rangers 2 was originally published in Russia by 1C Company in November 2004. In June 2005, Excalibur Publishing released a DVD version that included both Space Rangers 2 and its prequel, Space Rangers. Australian distributor Red Ant Enterprises released a CD-ROM version (Space Rangers 2 only) in 2005. In 2006, Cinemaware Marquee re-released the game as Space Rangers 2: Rise of the Dominators, as part of the publisher's strategy to import lesser known games from Europe, and to utilize the low cost of digital distributors such as Direct2Drive. This allowed the game to be released for a lower price point than similar games, as well as bundling it with the first Space Rangers from 2002, bringing the original title to North America for the first time.

An expansion called Space Rangers 2: Reboot was released in Russia on September 7, 2007, in Russia and in 2009 for the rest of the world, with slightly enhanced graphics, some new content and few quality of life improvements.

A remaster called Space Rangers HD: A War Apart was released on March 14, 2013, in Russia, and on October 17, 2013, in the rest of the world, which included 1920x1200 graphics and a new campaign.

== Reception ==
Space Rangers 2 has received an aggregate score of 84/100 on Metacritic, indicating "generally favorable reviews". IGN acknowledged the game's difficult interface, confusing translations, and lack of structure, but also saw this open-endedness as the game's greatest strength. Computer Games Magazine felt that the game's "amazing breadth and considerable depth more than make up for its initial difficulty and intermittent lack of polish". GameSpy also had high praise for the overall experience, and did not feel it that it could be undermined by translation and grammatical errors. 1up.com was critical of the game's dated graphics as well as its translation to English, but felt that the game's depth and replayability made it worthwhile to play anyway. GameSpot hailed Space Rangers 2 as a successor to Star Control II, making many favorable comparisons between the game's exploration, action, and sense of freedom. Writing a retrospective for The Gamer in 2020, Sean Murray praised the game's combination of systems as ahead of its time.

The editors of Computer Games Magazine named Space Rangers 2 the fifth-best computer game of 2005. They called it "an expansive, diverse, and irresistible amalgam of genres bundled within an impressively dynamic universe." It also won PC Gamer US's 2006 "Best Turn-Based Strategy Game" award.
