= Knights of the Temple II =

2005 video game

- Developer: Cauldron
- Publishers: Playlogic Entertainment; TDK Mediactive Europe; Evolved Games
- Platforms: Microsoft Windows; PlayStation 2 Xbox
- Release: 2005: US: 2007
- Genres: Action-adventure, hack and slash
- Modes: Single-player, multiplayer

Knights of the Temple II is an open-world action-adventure game, developed by Cauldron and published by Playlogic Entertainment in 2005 for Windows, PlayStation 2 and Xbox, and by Evolved Games in 2007. It is the sequel to Knights of the Temple: Infernal Crusade.

== Plot ==
Twenty years after Paul closed the Gate to Hell and defeated the evil Bishop, during the time then, he and Adelle fell in love but she was corrupted by a demon from Hell during his fight with the evil bishop. He then realises that his visions tell him about something evil that is coming, so he sets out on a journey to find the answers to his questions. His travels lead him to the Byzantine city of Sirmium, in which its inhabitants are under the scourge of an unknown disease, the pirate city Ylgar and the Saracen port Yusra.

Paul must find three artifacts – The Eye, The Weapon and The Rune to close the Gate to Hell. Each artifact is hidden in a different city. On his journey he must fight Undead, Daemonic creatures, Saracen armies, and even his own kind, before his final battle with the Devil himself. Only through blood can he meet his fate at the very doorstep to Hell.

The game has 2 endings depending on the actions of the player (Both endings take place after the Devil was banished through the portal). The bad ending sees Paul possessed by the Devil due to his bad deeds while alive, the Devil being able to continue his plans without anyone left to stop him. The good/normal ending sees Paul accepting his death to seal the Devil once again and save the world .

== Gameplay ==
It is an open-world game where there are main and secondary missions. You can interact with the people living in the different cities you visit, trade with blacksmiths to repair or sell your old equipment and in search of better weapons, find out the latest news in the tavern, as well as participate in fun challenges that will reward you with new locations in your map.

== Reception ==
Reception

Aggregate score
Aggregator	Score
Metacritic	53/100

Review scores
Publication	Score
Eurogamer	5/10
GameSpot	4.1/10
Pelit	77/100

Knights of the Temple II received mixed reviews according to video game review aggregator Metacritic. Reviewers highlighted the spectacular and fun combat with well designed monsters and boss encounters that is spoiled by camera angle and control problems, uninspired story and bland dialogues, resulting in a game lacking the necessary character to be memorable.
