= Dungeon Lords (video game) =

2005 video game

- Original release box art
- Developer: Heuristic Park
- Publishers: DreamCatcher Interactive, FX Interactive, Crimson Cow, 1C, Typhoon Games
- Designer: D.W. Bradley
- Platform: Microsoft Windows
- Release: NA: May 5, 2005; PAL: April 7, 2006
- Genre: Action role-playing
- Modes: Single-player, multiplayer

Dungeon Lords is an action role-playing game developed by Heuristic Park, originally published by DreamCatcher Interactive and Typhoon Games, and released in 2005. However, many features were left out from the original release in an effort to meet the release date. In 2006, they re-released the game as Dungeon Lords Collector's Edition with more complete features.

In 2012, after the demise of DreamCatcher Interactive and subsequent acquisition by Nordic Games, they announced the release of a completely "remastered" version of the game, titled Dungeon Lords MMXII. Dungeon Lords MMXII was released in Europe on September 28, 2012, and in North America on October 5, 2012.

In 2015, a version of the game titled Dungeon Lords Steam Edition was released on Steam.

== Gameplay ==
Dungeon Lords' gameplay features a combat system where weapon combos are controllable by mouse movements. It includes quests, personal missions, skills and special abilities for customizing the character hero from a small set of races and class specializations. Dungeon Lords can be played either single-player stand alone or in multi-player group sessions. The combat was inspired by console fighting games.

== Development ==
The game went gold on April 29, 2005.

== Reception ==
Reception

Aggregate score
Aggregator	Score
Metacritic	45/100

Review scores
Publication	Score
1Up.com	D−
Computer Gaming World	0/5
Game Informer	4/10
GameSpot	6.8/10
GameSpy	1.5/5
GameZone	(Coll. Ed.) 7.7/10; 7.6/10
IGN	4.5/10
PC Gamer (US)	45%
PC Zone	56%
X-Play	3/5

Many gamers experienced extensive problems while playing the original release of the game, including quest items disappearing from inventories, NPCs getting stuck, key quests failing, doors that do not work, etc.

The game received "generally unfavorable reviews" according to the review aggregation website Metacritic. Many reviews criticized the game's initial release as a rushed project, released before it was truly finished. Some have gone so far as to say the game is still in the beta development stage. Steve Carter of Game Over wrote, "Dungeon Lords marks a new low for how incomplete a game can be and still get released." Dan Adams of IGN wrote, "Dungeon Lords is a disaster. It's an unfinished, unpolished, and un-fun game that I thankfully never have to play again." Greg Kasavin of GameSpot wrote that the game, though fun, is unbalanced and was missing key features at launch.

== Legacy ==
An Xbox version was planned, but was later cancelled.

Dungeon Lords: The Orb and the Oracle, the sequel to Dungeon Lords, was in development with expected release in Q4 2009. It has since been put on hold indefinitely due to market research results and game engine instability. Later the game was cancelled and replaced with Dungeon Lords MMXII.
