= David W. Bradley =

Video game designer and programmer

David W. Bradley is a video game designer and programmer, most notable for the role-playing video games Wizardry V, VI, and VII.

== Career ==
Bradley was originally a music studies student when he learned about music composition software. He learned how to program to write his own software on the university mainframe and eventually began writing games. This translated into a job in the computer industry as a game designer and programmer. His early work includes Parthian Kings for Avalon Hill. After Robert Woodhead left the Wizardry video game series, Bradley co-designed Wizardry V: Heart of the Maelstrom (1988) with Andrew C. Greenberg. The design was based on a game that Bradley had already written several years prior, but it was rebranded and rewritten as a Wizardry sequel. Though recommended by contemporary game reviewers, Matt Barton wrote in Dungeons and Desktops that the game was not a significant departure from the previous titles, which were still using game design based on the 1981 original title. This was followed by Wizardry VI: Bane of the Cosmic Forge (1990) and Wizardry VII: Crusaders of the Dark Savant (1992), which formed the beginning of a new trilogy and were solely designed by Bradley. Both games were well received by critics, and the latter was praised for its design. During the development of the seventh game, Bradley was named in a lawsuit filed by Woodhead and Greenberg against Sir-Tech over royalties. Bradley said that he was uninvolved in the dispute, and, following a falling-out with Sir-Tech, left the company. He subsequently designed the action game CyberMage (1995) for Origin Systems. After founding Heuristic Park in 1995, he designed Wizards & Warriors (2000) and Dungeon Lords (2005).

=== Games ===
Name	Year	Credited with	Publisher
Parthian Kings	1983	designer	The Avalon Hill Game Company
Wizardry V: Heart of the Maelstrom	1988	designer, programmer	Sir-Tech
Wizardry VI: Bane of the Cosmic Forge	1990	designer, programmer	Sir-Tech
Wizardry VII: Crusaders of the Dark Savant	1992	designer, programmer	Sir-Tech
CyberMage: Darklight Awakening	1995	designer, programmer, writer	Electronic Arts
Wizardry Gold	1996	designer, programmer, writer	Sir-Tech
Wizards & Warriors	2000	designer, programmer, writer	Activision
Dungeon Lords	2005	designer, programmer, writer	DreamCatcher Interactive

=== Heuristic Park ===
Heuristic Park, Inc. is an American video game development company founded in 1995 by David W. Bradley. The company is based in Atlanta, Georgia and was founded after Bradley left Sir-Tech.

Games

- Wizards & Warriors (2000)
- Dungeon Lords (2005)
- Dungeon Lords: The Orb and the Oracle (cancelled)
- Dungeon Lords MMXII (2012)
