= BS12 TwellV =

Japanese satellite television channel

- Type: Free-to-air satellite
- Country: Japan
- Headquarters: Jingūmae, Shibuya, Tokyo

Programming
- Language: Japanese
- Picture format: 1080i HDTV

Ownership
- Owner: World Hi-Vision Channel, Inc.

History
- Launched: December 1, 2007

Links
- Website: www.twellv.co.jp

BS12 TwellV (トゥエルビ, Tuerubi), also simply known as BS12, is a Japanese satellite television channel owned by World Hi-Vision Channel, Inc. (Japanese: ワールド・ハイビジョン・チャンネル 株式会社, Hepburn: Wārudo Haibijon Chan'neru Kabushiki-gaisha; WHC), a wholly-owned subsidiary of Mitsui & Co.

The company was established on July 7, 2006 and received a license from the authorities on November 21, 2007. Days later, on December 1, broadcasts began.

The channel broadcasts a 24-hour schedule, starting at 5am, and broadcasts a mix of original and third-party content. It was one of the channels created from the shutdown of NHK BS hi, and was initially called BS TwellV. On April 1, 2015, the parent company joined the Japan Commercial Broadcasting Association. On October 1, 2015, the channel's name changed to BS12 TwellV.

From 2023, the channel's main emphasis is given to Asian dramas and baseball games.
