= The Legend of Three Kingdoms =

- Genre(s): Turn-based strategy
- Developer(s): UserJoy Technology
- First release: The Legend of Three Kingdoms; 1998
- Latest release: The Legend of Three Kingdoms VIII; 2021

The Legend of Three Kingdoms (simplified Chinese: 三国群英传; traditional Chinese: 三國群英傳; pinyin: Sān Guó Qún Yīng Zhuàn) is a video game series originally developed by OdinSoft, later by UserJoy Technology. The series includes seven PC-based single-player titles and three online and one mobile titles, which have been released in China, Japan, South Korea, Russia, the United States, and South Asia. The backdrop for the plot comes from Luo Guanzhong's 14th century novel, Romance of the Three Kingdoms.

== Series ==
Single-Player PC games

- The Legend of Three Kingdoms (1998)
- The Legend of Three Kingdoms II (1999)
- The Legend of Three Kingdoms III (2001)
- The Legend of Three Kingdoms IV (2002)
- The Legend of Three Kingdoms V (2005)
- The Legend of Three Kingdoms VI (2006)
- The Legend of Three Kingdoms VII (2007)
- The Legend of Three Kingdoms VIII (2021)

Online games

- The Legend of Three Kingdoms Online (2004)
- The Legend of Three Kingdoms 2 Online (2009)
- The Legend of Three Kingdoms Web (2014 browser game)

Mobile games

- The Legend of Three Kingdoms (2015)
