= Dragon Slayer: The Legend of Heroes II =

1992 video game

- PC Engine cover art
- Developer: Nihon Falcom
- Publishers: Hudson Soft; Epoch Co. Sega; GMF; Nihon Falcom
- Series: Dragon Slayer; The Legend of Heroes
- Platforms: NEC PC-8801, NEC PC-9801, PC Engine CD, FM Towns, Super Famicom, Mega Drive, MS-DOS, PlayStation, Sega Saturn
- Release: March 19, 1992: NEC PC-8801; JP: March 19, 1992 NEC PC-9801; JP: July 24, 1992 PC Engine CD; JP: December 23, 1992 FM Towns; JP: February 1993 Super Famicom; JP: June 4, 1993 Mega Drive; JP: January 20, 1995 PlayStation (I+II bundle); JP: June 25, 1998 Sega Saturn (I+II bundle); JP: September 23, 1998
- Genre: Role-playing
- Mode: Single-player

Dragon Slayer: The Legend of Heroes II (Note: Japanese: ドラゴンスレイヤー 英雄伝説II, Hepburn: Doragon Sureiyā Eiyū Densetsu II) is a 1992 role-playing video game by Nihon Falcom. It is part of the Dragon Slayer series and the second entry in The Legend of Heroes subseries. The game first released for the NEC PC-8801 before being ported to the NEC PC-9801, FM Towns, PC Engine, Mega Drive, Super Famicom and MS-DOS.

== Plot ==
The game is set 20 years after Prince Selios, the hero of the original game, has defeated the demon god Agunija. Iseruhasa is at peace. Selios has married Dina and she has given birth to Atlas. At the age of fifteen Atlas and his teacher Lowel spot strange beings in spacesuits outside of the capital city. They do not recognize the spacesuits and believe them to be monsters.

== Release ==
The game was ported to different platforms: it was published by Hudson Soft for PC Engine on December 23, 1992; by Epoch Co. for Super Famicom on June 4, 1993; and by Sega for Mega Drive on January 20, 1995. A bundle containing updated versions of both The Legend of Heroes and The Legend of Heroes II was released by GMF in 1998 for PlayStation on June 25 and for Sega Saturn on September 23. A Korean conversion of the original PC-9801 version was released for the MS-DOS/IBM PC by Mantra and Samsung in 1996.

== Reception ==
Reception

Review score
Publication	Score
Famitsu	23/40 (PCE); 26/40 (SFC); 20/40 (MD); 23/40 (PS)
