= The Legend of Heroes II: Prophecy of the Moonlight Witch =

1994 video game

- North American PSP box art
- Developer: Nihon Falcom
- Publisher: Namco Bandai Games
- Writer: Tadashi Hayakawa
- Series: The Legend of Heroes
- Platforms: PC-9801; Sega Saturn; PlayStation; Windows; PlayStation Portable
- Release: March 18, 1994: PC-9801; JP: March 18, 1994 Saturn; JP: February 26, 1998 PlayStation; JP: March 19, 1998 Windows; JP: April 23, 1999 PlayStation Portable; JP: December 16, 2004; NA: June 20, 2006
- Genre: Role-playing
- Mode: Single-player

The Legend of Heroes II: Prophecy of the Moonlight Witch, known as The Legend of Heroes III: Shiroki Majo (Note: Japanese: 英雄伝説III 白き魔女, Hepburn: Eiyū Densetsu III: Shiroki Majo; lit. "The Legend of Heroes III: White Witch") in Japan, is a 1994 role-playing video game developed by Nihon Falcom. It is the third game in The Legend of Heroes series, and the first in the Gagharv trilogy; however, it was retitled to include a "two" in the title for its North American release. Originally released for the NEC PC-9801 in 1994, it was later re-released on several other platforms, including the Sega Saturn, PlayStation, and Windows, before being released on the PlayStation Portable in 2006, the only version to be translated into English.

== Release ==
A Korean conversion of the original PC-9801 version was released for the MS-DOS/IBM PC by Mantra and Samsung in 1997.

There is some continuity confusion with the series because the fourth game in the series, The Legend of Heroes: A Tear of Vermillion, was released before this game in North America, without any sort of number attached to its title. This resulted in the inconsistent re-titling of The Legend of Heroes III to The Legend of Heroes II: Prophecy of the Moonlight Witch in North America.

== Reception ==
Reception

Aggregate scores
Aggregator	Score
GameRankings	PSP: 65%
Metacritic	PSP: 63/100

Review score
Publication	Score
Dengeki PlayStation	50/100, 70/100

The Legend of Heroes II: Prophecy of the Moonlight Witch has an aggregate score of 65% on GameRankings. Critical reception to the game has been mixed. Anoop Gantayat of IGN gave the game a generally positive preview, writing that it managed to avoid the pitfalls of many other "role-playing launch titles", praising the sharp graphics and fully developed world, and stating the game was "a good time overall". However, a later IGN review by Jeff Haynes was far less enthusiastic criticizing the game's plot for being "...extremely generic and bland..." and the battle system for being "flawed with some over balancing issues". Greg Kasavin of GameSpot was more forgiving, saying that "it doesn't noticeably improve on any aspect of its predecessor, including the story, characters, or quality of the text translation. But while some games have accomplished much, much more on these fronts, other games have done a lot worse". GamePro praised its "fairly long quest, memorable characters, and the addictive Pet System" but stating that the game is slow-paced in the first three or four hours. RPGFan said it was a generally good game that was greatly hampered by a poor English translation.
