= UserJoy Technology =

Taiwanese video game company

- Native name: 宇峻奧汀科技股份有限公司
- Industry: Video games
- Founded: 1995
- Headquarters: Taipei, Taiwan
- Website: userjoy.com

UserJoy Technology Co., Ltd. (Chinese: 宇峻奧汀科技股份有限公司; pinyin: Yǔjùn Àotīng) is a Taiwanese video game development and publishing company. The company was founded in 1995 in Taipei, Taiwan, and publishes worldwide.

== History ==
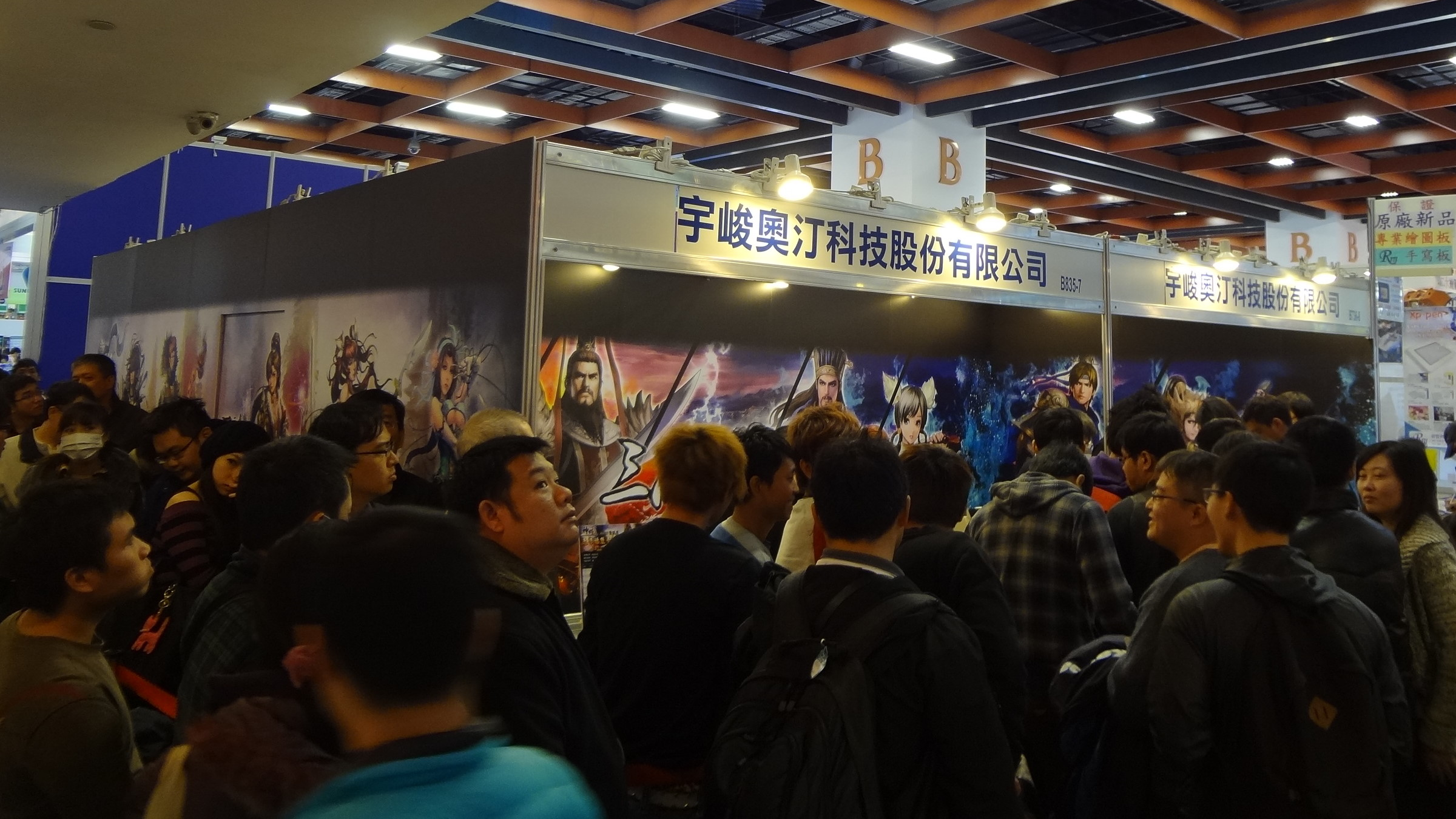
Taipei IT Month Userjoy 2013

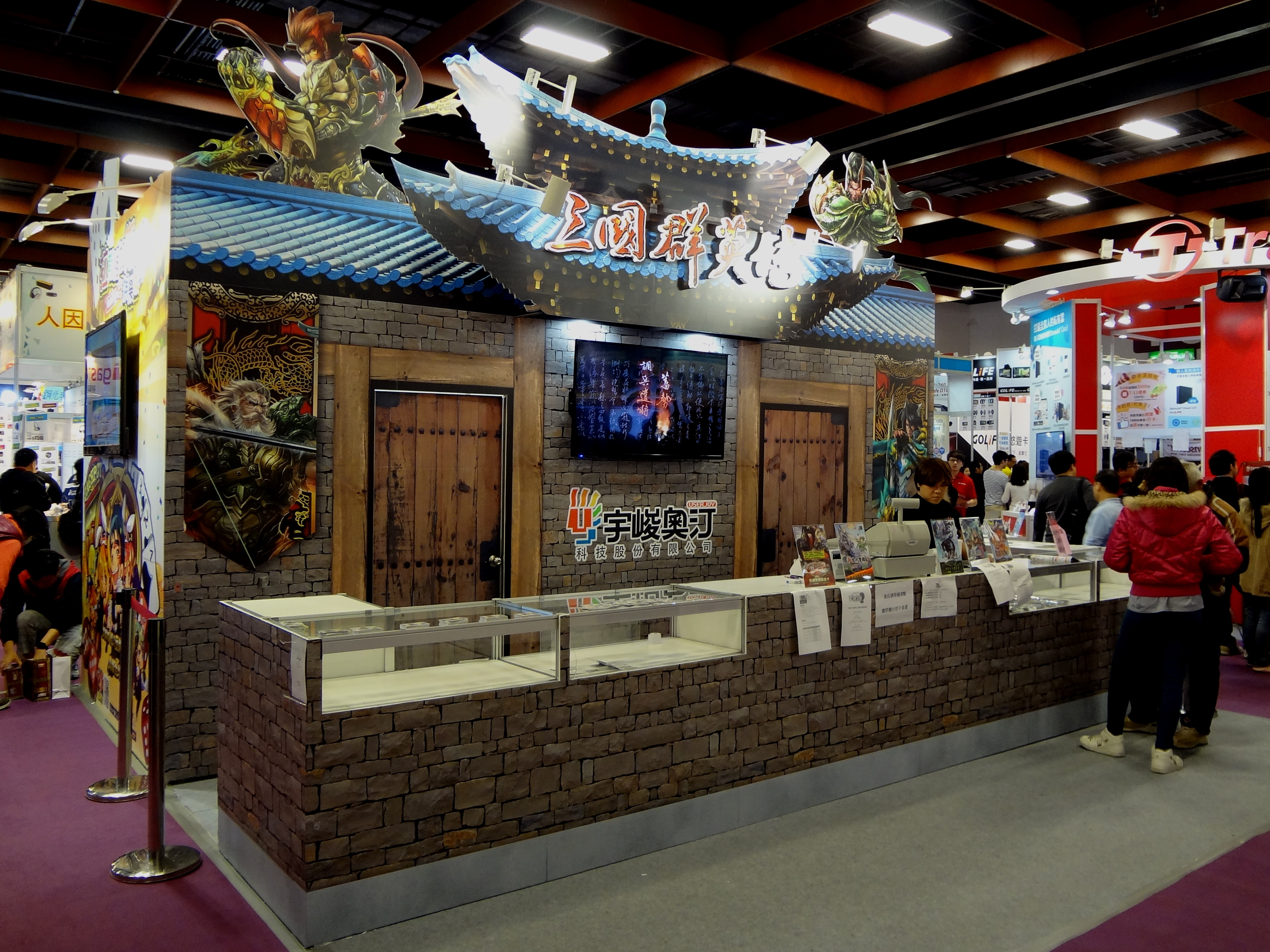
Userjoy Technology booth, Taipei IT Month 2016

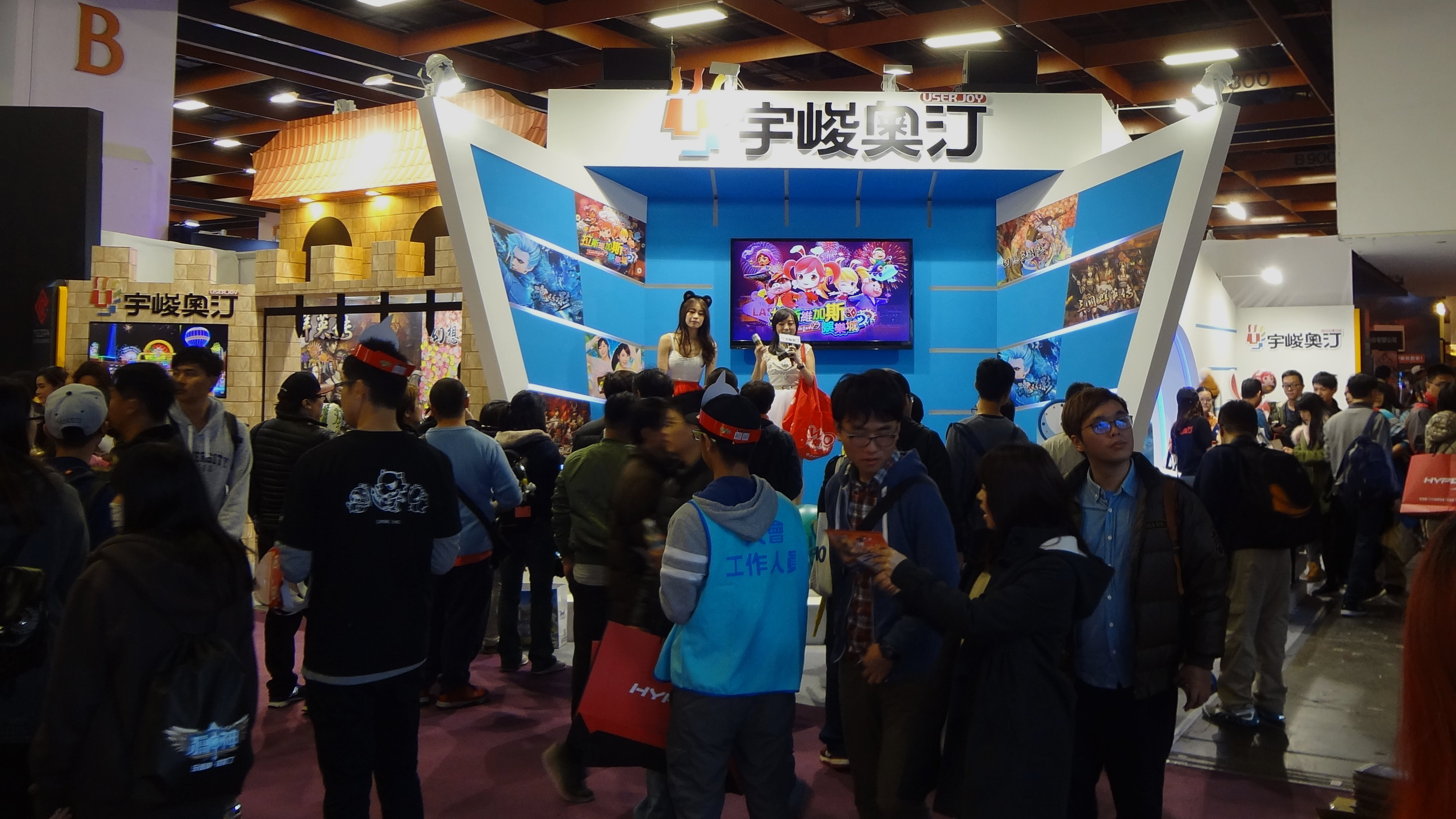
Userjoy Technology booth, Taipei Game Show 2017

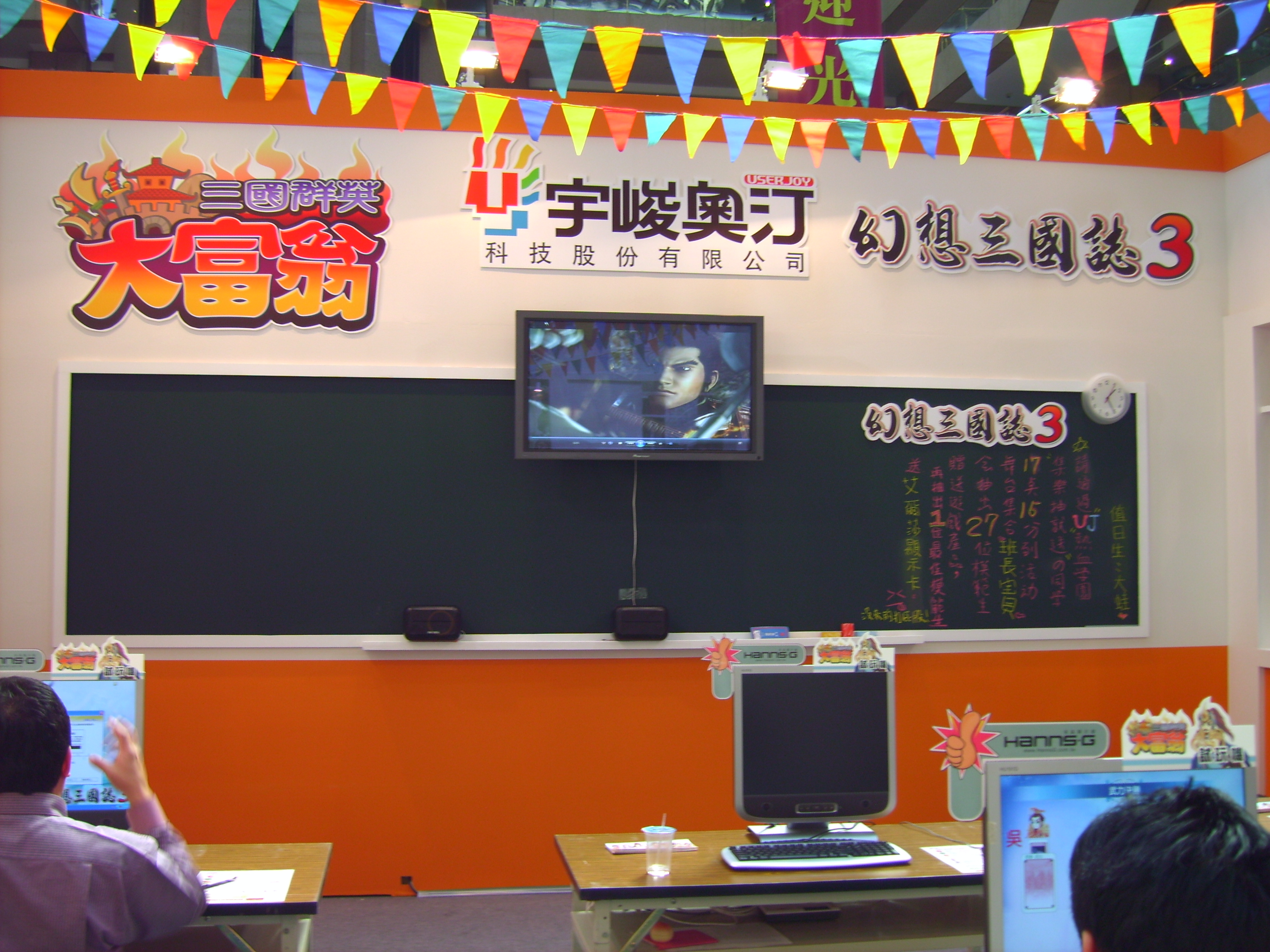
2007 Day1 UserJoy

=== Just developers ===
UserJoy was founded in May 1995. UserJoy Technology develops games for the PC, mostly including MMORPGs. Its 2003 Fantasia Sango series received Gamestar Awards when it was released, and outside mainland China, Hong Kong, and Taiwan, was published by Nihon Falcom.

UserJoy's Angel Love Online was published in Japan in 2006, followed by other countries. Its The Legend of Three Kingdoms Online was commercially launched in 2006, and then by Userjoy Japan in Japan in January 2008.

=== Publishing industry ===
In 2007, Userjoy went from being a game developer to also a game publisher, meaning that it began licensing games by other companies instead of just launching its own self-developed games. For example, it licensed Concerto Gate Online by Square Enix in China and other countries. In 2007, Userjoy jointly developed Angel Love Online PLAYSTATION 3 version with Q Entertainment Inc., to provide the first PS3 MMORPG. UserJoy's Field of Honor is a casual online game launched in January 2008.

On April 18, 2008, Userjoy went public on the GreTai Securities Market under the stock symbol 3546. In 2009, most of its revenue came from its online game business, at around 98 percent. In Asia's 200 Best Under A Billion article put out by Forbes in 2011, this company ranked 13 in net income, 16 in operating income, 46 in sales, and 81 in market value. In 2009, it was the second top performer of stocks traded on the GreTai Securities Market. In 2011, it was one of the more profitable Taiwan stock. In 2011, UserJoy began producing the free-to-play MMO version of the Ninety-Nine Nights along with Q Entertainment.

=== Newer games ===
The Legend of Heroes: Trails at Sunrise was first announced in 2014 as a project combining UserJoy and Falcom to commemorate the tenth anniversary of the Trails series. Though UserJoy rose to fame mainly for PC MMORPGs such as Angel Love Online and The Legend of Three Kingdoms Online, and later began branching out into mobile games.

== Developed games ==
=== Online ===
Name	Genre	Platform	Charge method	Release date and region
The Legend of Three Kingdoms Online	MMORPG	Online, PC, Mobile	Subscription & Microtransaction	Taiwan & China – Apr 2005; Thailand (by Funbox) – Aug 2006; Vietnam (by Asiasoft) – Nov 2006; Japan (by Userjoy Japan) – Dec 2007
Angel Love Online	MMORPG	Online, PC – Windows	Microtransaction	Taiwan – Aug 2006; Japan (by Q Entertainment) – Dec 2006; Indonesia (by WaveGame) – June 2007; North America & Europe (by Skyuion) – Dec 2007
The Twin Heroes	MMO Role-playing video game	Microsoft Windows/PC	Microtransaction	Taiwan, China – 2015
The Legend of Heroes: Trails at Sunrise	Role-playing game	Web browser, PlayStation Vita, PlayStation 3, PlayStation 4, Nintendo Switch	Gacha	Japan – Aug 2016
The Legend of Heroes: Trails of Cold Steel – Northern War	Role-playing game	Mobile	Gacha	Japan – Dec 2023

=== Offline ===
Name	Genre	Platform	Release region
Fantasia Sango series	RPG	PC– Windows	China, Taiwan, HK – 2003, Japan
The Legend of Three Kingdoms series	SLG	PC – Windows	China, Taiwan, and HK

== Published games ==
Title	Platform	Genre	Charge method	Release date
Field of Honor	PC – Windows	MMORSS (FPS+SLG)	Microtransaction	Taiwan — Jan. 2008
Moyu Online (Eudemons Online)	PC – Windows	MMORPG	Microtransaction	Taiwan — Jan. 2008
