= Elemental Games =

Game development company

Elemental Games was a game development company based in Vladivostok, Russia, best known for the multi-genre science fiction computer games Space Rangers and the sequel, Space Rangers 2: Dominators.

== Overview ==
Elemental Games was founded in December, 1999 as NewGame Software, a division of Degro, Ltd. NewGame Software's first releases were the freeware turn-based strategy game The General and the desktop application Panels. The company changed its name to Elemental Games in September, 2002. Its second game, Space Rangers, was released in December, 2002, by 1C Company. The sequel Space Rangers 2 was published in November, 2004. Following the release of Space Rangers 2, most members of the Elemental Games staff, including director general Dmitry Gusarov, departed to form a new game development company, Katauri Interactive, which released version 2.0 of Space Rangers 2, called Space Rangers 2: Reloaded, in Russia on September 7, 2007.

On Dec. 29, 2009 the company started a beta test for a new browser-based game called "Empire". The game action takes place in a few years after events in Space Rangers 2. "Disown way to global problems, the rulers of independent worlds, however, do not forget about their claims to the neighbors. As a result, some here and there began to appear local conflicts that plunged the inhabited part of the galaxy in chaos. Chaos, which spawned not only adventurers of all stripes, a new wave of piracy and the era of the superiority of force over the millennia-old laws, but a galaxy of colorful characters whose purpose was to combine disparate worlds into a single coalition."
