= Inuyasha: The Secret of the Cursed Mask =

2004 video game

- North American cover art
- Developer: Bandai
- Publisher: Bandai
- Platform: PlayStation 2
- Release: JP: March 18, 2004; NA: November 2, 2004
- Genre: Role-playing video game
- Mode: Single player

Inuyasha: The Secret of the Cursed Mask, known in Japan as Inuyasha: The Cursed Mask (犬夜叉 呪詛の仮面, InuYasha: Juso no Kamen), is a role-playing video game for the PlayStation 2 based on the manga and anime series Inuyasha. The player is able to choose to play as a female named Kaname Kururugi or as a male named Michiru Kururugi. Regardless of the chosen gender, the character is referred to using the last name Kururugi. However, in the North American release, the character is referred to using his/her first name (any sentences containing the player's name have no voiceover).

== Plot ==
The game begins when Kururugi enters the family storage shed in modern-day Japan to retrieve an item for father. After falling through a mysteriously etched pentagram on the floorboards, the player is transported to Feudal Japan. On his unfortune, the villagers mistake the time traveler as a demon and attack. After several close calls, Kururugi comes face to face with InuYasha, who notices the stranger's clothes "look like Kagome's".

After introductions with the rest of the cast, the player begins to search for answers as to why Kururugi has been brought back to the feudal era and how to get home. The game progresses as any normal InuYasha storyline, with the InuYasha group travelling from village to village in pursuit of Naraku (and Kururugi's answers), sometimes helping out with a local problem or two. Occasionally traces to Naraku himself are revealed, as well as leads to Kururugi's mystery and the title's "cursed mask", which holds secrets to returning the character to the present. Along the way, Kururugi learns to harness the power of shikigami from a mysterious old villager called Kakuju, a force needed in order to help InuYasha and the others overcome the dangerous obstacles ahead while unraveling the plot of the mystic Utsugi.

Several characters from the anime appear to help, or hinder, the group's progress, including Kikyo, Kagura, Koga and Sesshomaru.

In the end, Utsugi is revealed to be a Hitogata in the image of Kakuju's deceased spouse; Utsugi summoned Kururugi to the past to steal his/her descendant's soul in order to become human and live with Kakuju again. However, Naraku ends up possessing Utsugi for the power of Shikigami. After a long battle, Naraku is sent to Hell and Utsugi dies happy, having unknowingly taken Kakuju's soul and became human. With Utsugi's magic gone, Kururugi is sent back to the present, where it is revealed the festival at the shrine is based on Kururugi's adventure. Kururugi thinks of the member of Inuyasha's group the player spent the most time with.

=== Characters ===
Michiru Kururugi (枢木 みちる, Kururugi Michiru)

Voiced by: Takashi Kondō (Japanese), Sean Broadhurst (English)

The male version of the main character in the game. He has the mysterious and powerful powers of the Shikigami, which come down to the four elements: fire, water, wind, and light. Animal symbols for his elemental attacks also exist. All co-operative attacks involve his Shikigami enhancing the normal attacks of his friends. Compared to Kaname, Michiru hardly raises his voice when shocked.

Kaname Kururugi (枢木 かなめ, Kururugi Kaname)

Voiced by: Ryōko Nagata (Japanese), Carol-Anne Day (English)

The female version of the main character in the game. She has the mysterious and powerful powers of the Shikigami, which come down to the four elements: fire, water, wind, and light. Animal symbols for her elemental attacks also exist. All co-operative attacks involved her Shikigami enhancing the normal attacks of her friends. Kaname tends to shriek when surprised or scared.
Utsugi (ウツギ)

Voiced by Katsuyuki Konishi (Male; Japanese), Atsuko Tanaka (Female; Japanese), TBA (Male; English), TBA (Female; English)

Utsugi is a Hitogata, an enchanted clay doll that was granted life by the priest/priestess Kakuju and the power of Shikigami after Kakuju's original lover, Utsugi, died. Many attempts were made to breathe life into a doll before the final version of Utsugi succeeded, and the imperfect Utsugi-hitogata were discarded in the valley below Kakuju's village. Kakuju mystically sealed the valley and isolated the village to prevent these wandering, imperfect dolls to escape and harm anyone. Eager to become truly human and please Kakuju, Utsugi joined up with Naraku and his incarnations in order to summon Kururugi to the past. Because Kururugi was a descendant on the original Utsugi and gifted with the power of shikigami, Utsugi planned to absorb his/her soul and become human.

Kakuju (覚樹(かくじゅ))

Voiced by Shirō Saitō (Male; Japanese), Aoi Tamagawa (Female; Japanese), TBA (Male; English) TBA (Female; English)

An old man or woman who assists the main character by teaching him/her about Shikigami and more, including his/her past connection with Utsugi. Kakuju traveled to find Utsugi to make amends for his/her past mistakes, and to start over.

Mahoro (まほろ)
A demon with the ability to transform into a person's loved one or closest friend. He appears in Minomo Village when using this ability to "spirit away" villagers and on Asagiri Island as a merchant the player can buy items from.

Ogre
Known as "Skeletal demon", Ogre is an incarnation of Naraku that a demon puppet of Naraku releases on InuYasha and the others in Naraku's castle. Its attacks are limited to a full-group blast of miasma and a single swipe at one character.

== Character selection ==
The chosen gender of the main character has several subtle but interesting changes on the overall flow of the game. While the core plot remains the same regardless of Kururugi being a boy or girl, the later character responses, interval events, and battle abilities can change dramatically depending upon whether Kururgi is male or female. For example, when the female Kururugi first encounters Miroku in the game, the lecherous monk greets her with his typical, "Would you bear my child?" The male Kururugi gets no such offer.

What choices are made on the part of the player to interact with the InuYasha universe will also influence the strength of partnerships in battle and result in different character-centric anime sequences at the end of the game.

== Interval events ==
Every so often, players will receive an opportunity to "rest up" the InuYasha gang before setting off for a new location. If the player opts to take these breaks, short interval scenes will occur in which the main character can interact one-on-one with a member of the group. Choosing between InuYasha, Kagome, Miroku, Sango or Shippo will result in several different scenes, which vary in tone; the episodes begin as playful incidents and develop into deep and dramatic scenes later in the game. The more often a specific character is chosen, the stronger the player's friendship will become with that character, thus increasing the effectiveness of pairing with that character in Co-Op Technique battle; if the player opts to skip these interval events, the only penalty is a slower acquisition of Co-Op techniques.

An interesting fan service aspect of this relationship-building is that Kururugi will become "strong friends" with whichever of the InuYasha group he or she has spent the most time with. When paired with the opposite sex, love triangles begin to form between the canon pairings and the player character. For example, if the male Kururugi spends a majority of his interval events bonding with Kagome, InuYasha will grow increasingly jealous (or vice versa), or if the female Kururugi spends a majority of her interval events bonding with Miroku, Sango will get jealous. Also, there is a chance for the female Kururugi to be paired with Sesshomaru. This is achieved when the player gets the female character in some of the areas where Sesshomaru is. No negative impacts occur to the canon pairings if Shippo is the one the player becomes closest to, given that both Michiru and Kaname consider him a little brother.

== Reception ==
Reception

Aggregate score
Aggregator	Score
Metacritic	51/100

Review scores
Publication	Score
Famitsu	24/40
Game Informer	4.25/10
GameSpot	5.3/10
Official U.S. PlayStation Magazine	1/5
PlayStation: The Official Magazine	6/10

The game received "mixed" reviews according to video game review aggregator Metacritic. In Japan, Famitsu gave it a score of one seven, one six, one five, and one six, for a total of 24 out of 40.
