= The Legend of Heroes: A Tear of Vermillion =

1996 video game

- North American PSP box art
- Developer: Nihon Falcom
- Publisher: Namco Bandai Games
- Series: The Legend of Heroes
- Platforms: PC-9801; PlayStation; Windows; PlayStation Portable
- Release: May 24, 1996: PC-9801; JP: May 24, 1996 PlayStation; JP: August 27, 1998 Windows; JP: December 7, 2000 PlayStation Portable; JP: June 2, 2005; NA: November 15, 2005
- Genre: Role-playing
- Mode: Single-player

The Legend of Heroes: A Tear of Vermillion, known as The Legend of Heroes IV: Akai Shizuku (Note: Japanese: 英雄伝説IV 朱紅い雫, Hepburn: Eiyū Densetsu IV: Akai Shizuku) in Japan, is a 1996 role-playing video game developed by Nihon Falcom. It is the fourth game in The Legend of Heroes series, and the second in the Gagharv trilogy. Originally released for the NEC PC-9801 in 1996, it was later released for the PlayStation in 1998 and Windows in 2000. A remake was released for the PlayStation Portable in 2005, which was the first North American release of a Legend of Heroes game since Dragon Slayer: The Legend of Heroes for the TurboGrafx-16. The North American release dropped the number from the title.

== Plot ==
The setting for the fourth Legend of Heroes game and the second in the Gagharv trilogy takes place in the fictional land of El Phildin, fifty-six years before the events of Moonlight Witch. The story begins with an insight into the past. Avin and Eimelle are orphaned children, ages 10 and 8, respectively, who are living in the city of Cathedral after being taken in by Supreme Priest Esperius. Avin is seen bringing milk for the kitten Eimelle snuck into the chapel. They both watch it drink to its heart's content. Before long, Oracle Ollesia appears. The children panic at being caught with the smuggled kitten, but Ollesia doesn't seem too concerned with that, yelling at them to take cover. The Cathedral is under attack.

Lord Bellias and his minions attack the chapel. He reveals the reason for his not-so-friendly visit to the Cathedral: he is after Eimelle, whom he calls "Durga's Daughter". Bellias is stopped by Supreme Priest Esperius, who buys time for Avin, Eimelle, the kitten, and Ollesia to escape. The two men have a conversation regarding Bellias' destiny to lead the Bardus Church and how he became a traitor of the Church. The two wizards fight each other, with Esperius easily bested by Bellias' superior magical prowess (and perhaps also due to the fact that he's positively ancient). Esperius dies after being attacked with Bellias' rising spell.

The two kids and Professor Ollesia attempt their escape before being cornered by Bellias and his minions. Gawaine, the "Sage of power", appears suddenly to fend off the attack and allow the group to escape. They exit the monster cart in front of the building. Bellias, however, catches up to them and launches a spell at the cart. The kitten becomes frightened after hearing the spell and leaps out of the cart, worrying Eimelle. Avin tries to rescue it, but is ambushed by several dark spells. Gawaine comes to his rescue, but the two are unable to find an opportunity to get back into the cart. Gawaine instructs the paladin in control of the monster cart to break off into two groups. Ollesia and Eimelle escape to an unknown place, with Avin left in Gawaine's care.

Avin wakes up from a nightmare in the house of Lemuras, the "Sage of Mercy", feeling sick because he couldn't save Eimelle. After the two have breakfast, Lemuras requests that Avin deliver a letter to someone in Ourt Village. There, he learns about his home. After getting the letter, someone begins following him. That person turns out to be Mile, a lonely young boy. After delivering the letter and receiving another to give back to Lemuras, Avin heads back. Mile catches up with him before he leaves and tells him of/invites him to the Festival of Nepthys, the town deity. Every year, the people of Ourt go around the village in search of special charms that can be used to make a wish to Nepthys by throwing them into a pond connected to the Nepthys Shrine. According to this tradition, your wish will be granted between that festival and the next festival, but only if the charm floats to the middle of the pond.

A few days later, Avin joins Mile in finding the two charms required to make their wishes. After finding them, Avin throws his into the pond to see if his wish to see Eimelle again will be granted. The town cheers him on, but the charm does not make it to the center of the pond, which crushes Avin's hope. Suddenly, Mile throws his charm into the pond, also wishing that Avin could see Eimelle again. It reaches the center, meaning Mile's wish will be granted. Avin is shocked at his selfless act, wondering why Mile made a wish for him instead of making his own wish. Mile says that his wish has already come true. That is, the one that he made during the last festival. He says he made a wish to make a friend.

== Main characters ==
- Avin
- Eimelle
- Rutice
- Mile
- Shannon
- Martie
- Muse
- Douglas
- Lucias
- Archem
- Conrad
- Rael
- Professor Elenoa
- Michel de Lap Haven
- Thomas
- Rouca
- Gawain
- Madram
- Dominique

== Release ==
A Korean conversion of the original PC-9801 version was released for the MS-DOS/IBM PC by Mantra and Samsung in 1997.

Some confusion was caused by the North American release of the game. While the remake of The Legend of Heroes IV was the first to be released in North America, the PSP remake of its predecessor, The Legend of Heroes III, had been released several months before it in Japan. The Legend of Heroes III was eventually released in North America in 2006, with its title changed to The Legend of Heroes II: Prophecy of the Moonlight Witch.

== Reception ==
Reception

Aggregate score
Aggregator	Score
Metacritic	PSP: 68/100

The PSP version received "mixed or average" reviews according to review aggregator Metacritic.
