= List of Dungeons & Dragons video games =

This is a list of officially licensed video games which use the Dungeons & Dragons (D&D) fantasy tabletop role-playing game IP. This includes computer games, console games, arcade games, and mobile games. Video games which use the D&D mechanics via the SRD rather than official license are not included on this list.

== Licensing history ==
The first Dungeons & Dragons licensed games were made by Mattel for the Intellivision. The contract required some variations to the normal Intellivision title screens with the name being capitalized and the addition of the word "cartridge". The games, however, had nothing to do with the rules or any of the settings.

Up until 1987, a number of games inspired by Dungeons & Dragons had appeared, such as the Wizardry and Ultima series, but these were not licensed from TSR. TSR considered making their own video games and passed on the idea, and instead announced in 1987 that it was looking for a game development partner to make officially-licensed games. At least ten different companies applied, including Electronic Arts and Origin Systems, but TSR awarded the contract to Strategic Simulations, Inc. (SSI) primarily because of their broader vision and their experience in computerized wargaming. After a successful run with their Gold Box series of games, SSI lost their exclusive license in 1994. TSR then divided the license among multiple publishers.

TSR awarded Interplay Productions, Inc. a license to use the Forgotten Realms and Planescape trademarks and associated properties for use in computer and video game products. Within Interplay, a division named Black Isle Studios used this license arrangement to develop a series of successful games based upon the two D&D settings. They also published Baldur's Gate series developed by the Canadian company BioWare. In 2003, Interplay ran into financial difficulties, resulting in the closure of Black Isle Studios. Their next planned D&D video game, code-named "Jefferson", was canceled as a result of legal issues with Wizards of the Coast, the new rights holders to the D&D franchise.

Wizards of the Coast purchased TSR, the makers of Dungeons & Dragons, in 1997. They in turn were acquired by Hasbro in 1999. As a result, the subsidiary Hasbro Interactive gained the right to use the Dungeons & Dragons game brand in their video game products. In 2001, facing financial difficulties, Hasbro sold 100% of Hasbro Interactive to French software concern Infogrames Entertainment, SA in a US$100 million deal. This led to the publication of Neverwinter Nights in 2002, a game also developed by Bioware.

== List of games ==
This list is categorized by campaign setting in descending order by number of games.

The cell color corresponds to the following common game engines used for D&D video games.

Gold Box Engine
Infinity Engine
Dark Alliance Engine
Aurora Engine
Electron Engine
Unity

=== Forgotten Realms ===
The majority of D&D video games are set in the Forgotten Realms setting, and since 2007 all D&D video games have been set there.

Title	Series	Genre	Platform(s)	Developer	Release	Engine
Pool of Radiance	Pool of Radiance	RPG (turn-based)	Home computers, NES	SSI	1988	Gold Box
Hillsfar	Pool of Radiance	Action-adventure	Home computers, NES	Westwood Studios	1989	
Curse of the Azure Bonds	Pool of Radiance	RPG (turn-based)	Home computers	SSI	1989	Gold Box
Secret of the Silver Blades	Pool of Radiance	RPG (turn-based)	Home computers	SSI	1990	Gold Box
Eye of the Beholder	Eye of the Beholder	RPG (action-based)	Home computers, Sega CD, SNES, Amiga	Westwood Studios	1990	EotB
Eye of the Beholder II: The Legend of Darkmoon	Eye of the Beholder	RPG (action-based)	Home computers, Amiga	Westwood Studios	1991	EotB
Pools of Darkness	Pool of Radiance	RPG (turn-based)	Home computers	SSI	1991	Gold Box
Gateway to the Savage Frontier	Savage Frontier	RPG (turn-based)	Home computers	Stormfront Studios	1991	Gold Box
Treasures of the Savage Frontier	Savage Frontier	RPG (turn-based)	MS-DOS, Amiga	Stormfront Studios	1992	Gold Box
Eye of the Beholder III: Assault on Myth Drannor	Eye of the Beholder	RPG (action-based)	MS-DOS, PC-98	SSI	1993	Aesop
Forgotten Realms: Unlimited Adventures		RPG (turn-based)	MS-DOS, Mac	MicroMagic, Inc.	1993	Gold Box
Dungeon Hack		RPG (roguelike)	MS-DOS	DreamForge Intertainment	1993	Aesop
Menzoberranzan		RPG (action-based)	MS-DOS	DreamForge Intertainment	1994	Ravenloft
Blood & Magic		Real-time strategy	MS-DOS	Tachyon Studios	1996	
Descent to Undermountain		RPG (action-based)	MS-DOS, Windows	Interplay	1998	Descent
Baldur's Gate	Baldur's Gate	RPG	Windows, Mac	BioWare	30 Nov 1998	Infinity Engine
Baldur's Gate: Tales of the Sword Coast	Baldur's Gate	RPG	Windows, Mac	BioWare	30 Apr 1999	Infinity Engine
Icewind Dale	Icewind Dale	RPG	Windows, Mac	Black Isle Studios	20 Jun 2000	Infinity Engine
Baldur's Gate II: Shadows of Amn	Baldur's Gate	RPG	Windows, Mac	BioWare	24 Sep 2000	Infinity Engine
Icewind Dale: Heart of Winter	Icewind Dale	RPG	Windows	Black Isle Studios	21 Feb 2001	Infinity Engine
Baldur's Gate II: Throne of Bhaal	Baldur's Gate	RPG	Windows, Mac	BioWare	21 Jun 2001	Infinity Engine
Icewind Dale: Trials of the Luremaster	Icewind Dale	RPG	Windows	Black Isle Studios	7 Sep 2001	Infinity Engine
Pool of Radiance: Ruins of Myth Drannor	Pool of Radiance	RPG (turn-based)	Windows	Stormfront Studios	27 Sep 2001	
Baldur's Gate: Dark Alliance	Dark Alliance	Hack and slash	PS2, Xbox, GameCube, GBA	Snowblind Studios	2 Dec 2001	Dark Alliance Engine
Neverwinter Nights	Neverwinter Nights	RPG	Windows, Mac, Linux	BioWare	18 Jun 2002	Aurora Engine
Icewind Dale II	Icewind Dale	RPG	Windows	Black Isle Studios	27 Aug 2002	Infinity Engine
Dungeons & Dragons: Eye of the Beholder		RPG (turn-based)	Game Boy Advance	Pronto Games	30 Oct 2002	
Neverwinter Nights: Shadows of Undrentide	Neverwinter Nights	RPG	Windows, Mac, Linux	Floodgate Entertainment, BioWare	21 Jun 2003	Aurora Engine
Neverwinter Nights: Hordes of the Underdark	Neverwinter Nights	RPG	Windows, Mac, Linux	BioWare	2 Dec 2003	Aurora Engine
Baldur's Gate: Dark Alliance II	Dark Alliance	Hack and slash	PS2, Xbox	Black Isle Studios	20 Jan 2004	Dark Alliance Engine
Forgotten Realms: Demon Stone		RPG (action-based)	Windows, PS2, Xbox	Stormfront Studios	14 Sep 2004	
Neverwinter Nights: Shadowguard	Neverwinter Nights	RPG	Windows, Mac, Linux	Floodgate Entertainment	10 Nov 2004	Aurora Engine
Neverwinter Nights: Witch's Wake	Neverwinter Nights	RPG	Windows, Mac, Linux	BioWare	10 Nov 2004	Aurora Engine
Neverwinter Nights: Kingmaker	Neverwinter Nights	RPG	Windows, Mac, Linux	BioWare	10 Nov 2004	Aurora Engine
Neverwinter Nights: Pirates of the Sword Coast	Neverwinter Nights	RPG	Windows, Mac, Linux	BioWare	20 Sep 2005	Aurora Engine
Neverwinter Nights: Infinite Dungeons	Neverwinter Nights	RPG	Windows, Mac, Linux	BioWare	26 May 2006	Aurora Engine
Neverwinter Nights: Wyvern Crown of Cormyr	Neverwinter Nights	RPG	Windows, Mac, Linux	BioWare	14 Sep 2006	Aurora Engine
Neverwinter Nights 2	Neverwinter Nights	RPG	Windows, Mac	Obsidian Entertainment	31 Oct 2006	Electron Engine
Neverwinter Nights 2: Mask of the Betrayer	Neverwinter Nights	RPG	Windows	Obsidian Entertainment	27 Sep 2007	Electron Engine
Neverwinter Nights 2: Storm of Zehir	Neverwinter Nights	RPG	Windows	Obsidian Entertainment	18 Nov 2008	Electron Engine
Neverwinter Nights 2: Mysteries of Westgate	Neverwinter Nights	RPG	Windows	Ossian Studios	29 Apr 2009	Electron Engine
Dungeons & Dragons: Daggerdale	Dark Alliance	Hack and slash	PS3, Xbox 360, Windows	Bedlam Games	25 May 2011	
Baldur's Gate: Enhanced Edition	Baldur's Gate	RPG	Windows, Mac, Linux, iOS, Android	Overhaul Games	28 Sep 2012	Infinity Enhanced Engine
Neverwinter		MMORPG	Windows, Xbox One, PS4	Cryptic Studios	20 Jun 2013	
Baldur's Gate II: Enhanced Edition	Baldur's Gate	RPG	Windows, Mac, Linux, iOS, Android	Overhaul Games	15 Nov 2013	Infinity Enhanced Engine
Icewind Dale: Enhanced Edition	Icewind Dale	RPG	Windows, Mac, Linux, iOS, Android	Overhaul Games	30 Oct 2014	Infinity Enhanced Engine
Lords of Waterdeep		Boardgame	iOS, Android	Playdek	21 Nov 2014	
Sword Coast Legends		RPG	Windows, OS X, Linux, PS4, Xbox One	N-Space, Digital Extremes	29 Sep 2015	
Baldur's Gate: Siege of Dragonspear	Baldur's Gate	RPG	Windows, Mac, Linux, iOS, Android	Beamdog	31 Mar 2016	Infinity Enhanced Engine
Idle Champions of the Forgotten Realms		Incremental game	Mac, Windows, iOS, Android, PS4, Xbox	Codename Entertainment	8 Sep 2017	
Tales from Candlekeep: Tomb of Annihilation		Boardgame	Mac, Windows	BKOM Studios	11 Oct 2017	
Neverwinter Nights: Enhanced Edition	Neverwinter Nights	RPG	Windows, Mac	Beamdog	27 Mar 2018	Aurora Enhanced Engine
Dungeons & Dragons: Dark Alliance	Dark Alliance	Hack and slash	PlayStation 4, PlayStation 5, Windows, Xbox One, Xbox Series	Tuque Games	2021	
Baldur's Gate 3	Baldur's Gate	RPG	Windows, macOS, PlayStation 5, Xbox Series X/S	Larian Studios	3 Aug 2023	Divinity 4 Engine
Neverwinter Nights 2: Enhanced Edition	Neverwinter Nights	RPG	Windows, Mac	Aspyr	15 Jul 2025	Electron Enhanced Engine

Former online games

Title	Genre	Platform(s)	Developer	Release	Down	Engine
Neverwinter Nights	RPG (turn-based)	Home computers	AOL, Stormfront Studios, SSI	1991	Jul 1997	Gold Box
Neverwinter Nights: Mobile	RPG (action-based)	Mobile phone	Floodgate Entertainment	2004	c. 2011	
Dungeons & Dragons: Tiny Adventures	Idle game	Facebook	Wizards of the Coast	2008	2010	
Heroes of Neverwinter	Tactical role-playing game	Facebook	Liquid Entertainment	2011	Dec 2012	
Dungeons & Dragons: Arena of War	Action	iOS, Android	DeNA	18 Oct 2013	Aug 2014	Unity
Warriors of Waterdeep	Turn-based tactics	Android, iOS	Ludia	May 2019	Dec 2022	

=== Dragonlance ===
Title	Series	Genre	Platform(s)	Developer	Release	Engine
Heroes of the Lance	Silver Box	Action platformer	Home computers, NES, Master System	U.S. Gold	1988	Silver Box
Dragons of Flame	Silver Box	Action platformer	Home computers, NES	U.S. Gold	1989	Silver Box
Shadow Sorcerer	Silver Box	Real-time strategy	Home computers	U.S. Gold	1991	Silver Box
War of the Lance		Turn-based strategy	Home computers	SSI	1989	
DragonStrike		Flight simulator	Home computers	Westwood Studios	1990	
DragonStrike (NES)		Scrolling shooter	NES	Westwood Studios	1992	
Champions of Krynn	Gold Box: Dragonlance	RPG (turn-based)	Home computers	SSI	1990	Gold Box
Death Knights of Krynn	Gold Box: Dragonlance	RPG (turn-based)	Home computers	SSI	1991	Gold Box
The Dark Queen of Krynn	Gold Box: Dragonlance	RPG (turn-based)	Home computers	SSI	1992	Gold Box

=== Mystara ===
Title	Genre	Platform(s)	Developer	Release
Dungeons & Dragons: Order of the Griffon	RPG (turn-based)	TurboGrafx 16	Westwood Studios	1992
Dungeons & Dragons: Warriors of the Eternal Sun	RPG (turn-based)	Sega Genesis	Westwood Studios	1992
Fantasy Empires	Turn-based strategy	MS-DOS	Silicon Knights	1993
Dungeons & Dragons: Tower of Doom	Hack and slash	Arcade, Sega Saturn	Capcom	1994
Dungeons & Dragons: Shadow over Mystara	Hack and slash	Arcade, Sega Saturn	Capcom	1996

=== Dark Sun ===
Title	Genre	Platform(s)	Developer	Release
Dark Sun: Shattered Lands	RPG (turn-based)	MS-DOS	SSI	1993
Dark Sun: Wake of the Ravager	RPG (turn-based)	MS-DOS	SSI	1994
Dark Sun Online: Crimson Sands	MMORPG	Windows	SSI	1996

=== Ravenloft ===
Title	Genre	Platform(s)	Developer	Release	Engine
Ravenloft: Strahd's Possession	RPG (action-based)	MS-DOS	DreamForge Intertainment	1994	
Ravenloft: Stone Prophet	RPG (action-based)	MS-DOS	DreamForge Intertainment	1995	
Iron & Blood: Warriors of Ravenloft	Fighting	MS-DOS, PlayStation	Take 2 Interactive	1996	
Warlock: Dungeons & Dragons	Action-adventure	Windows, PlayStation 5, Xbox Series X/S	Invoke Studios	2027	Unreal Engine 5

=== Planescape ===
Title	Genre	Platform(s)	Developer	Release
Planescape: Torment	RPG	Windows	Black Isle Studios	December 12, 1999
Planescape: Torment: Enhanced Edition	RPG	Windows, Mac, Linux	Overhaul Games	April 11, 2017

=== Greyhawk ===
Greyhawk was the original Advanced Dungeons & Dragons setting. It was superseded by the Forgotten Realms after 1987, but it became the official default D&D setting in 2000. The Greyhawk video games were released shortly after.

Title	Genre	Platform(s)	Developer	Release
Dungeons & Dragons: Heroes	Hack and Slash	Xbox	Atari Hunt Valley Development Studio	September 2003
The Temple of Elemental Evil	RPG (turn based)	Windows	Troika Games	September 16, 2003

=== Eberron ===
Title	Genre	Platform(s)	Developer	Release
Dungeons & Dragons: Dragonshard	Real-time strategy	Windows	Liquid Entertainment	September 21, 2005
Dungeons & Dragons Online: Stormreach	MMORPG	Windows	Turbine, Inc.	February 28, 2006

=== Other settings ===
Title	Setting	Genre	Platform(s)	Developer	Release	Engine
Dungeons & Dragons Computer Fantasy Game	Generic	Action	Handheld LCD	Mattel	1981	
Advanced Dungeons & Dragons: Cloudy Mountain	Generic	Action-adventure	Intellivision	Mattel	1982	
Advanced Dungeons & Dragons: Treasure of Tarmin	Generic	Action-adventure	Intellivision	Tom Loughry	1982	
Spelljammer: Pirates of Realmspace	Spelljammer	RPG (turn-based)	MS-DOS	Cybertech Systems	1992	Gold Box
Stronghold	Generic	Real-time strategy	MS-DOS	Stormfront Studios	1993	
Al-Qadim: The Genie's Curse	Al-Qadim	RPG (action-based)	MS-DOS	Cyberlore Studios	1994	
Slayer	Generic	RPG (action-based)	3DO	Lion Entertainment	1994	
DeathKeep	Generic	FPS	Windows, 3DO	Lion Entertainment	1996	
Birthright: The Gorgon's Alliance	Birthright	Turn-based strategy	MS-DOS	Synergistic Software	1996	
Dungeons & Dragons Tactics	Generic	RPG (turn based)	PSP	Kuju Entertainment	August 14, 2007	

=== Collections ===
Title	Series	Setting	Platform(s)	Publisher	Release
AD&D Limited Edition Collector's Set	Various	Various	MS-DOS	SSI	1990
AD&D Collector's Edition	Various	Various	MS-DOS, Mac	WizardWorks	1994
AD&D Collector's Edition Vol. 3	Savage Frontier	Forgotten Realms	MS-DOS	SSI	1994
Fantasy Fest!	Various	Forgotten Realms	MS-DOS	SSI	1994
AD&D Eye of the Beholder Trilogy	Eye of the Beholder	Forgotten Realms	MS-DOS	SSI	1995
AD&D Ultimate Fantasy	Various	Various	Intellivision	Slash Corporation	1995
AD&D Masterpiece Collection	Dark Sun/Ravenloft	Dark Sun/Ravenloft	Windows	Mindscape	1996
The Forgotten Realms Archives	Various	Forgotten Realms	Windows	Interplay	1997
The Forgotten Realms Deluxe Edition	Various	Forgotten Realms	Windows	Interplay	2006
Dungeons & Dragons Collection	Mystara	Mystara	Sega Saturn	Capcom	April 3, 1999
Gamefest: Forgotten Realms Classics	Various	Forgotten Realms	Windows	Interplay	2001
Neverwinter Nights Gold Edition	Neverwinter Nights	Forgotten Realms	Windows	Infogrames	2003
Neverwinter Nights Platinum Edition	Neverwinter Nights	Forgotten Realms	Windows	Infogrames	2004
Atari Collection: Rollenspiele	Various	Various	Windows	Atari	2005
Neverwinter Nights Diamond Compilation	Neverwinter Nights	Forgotten Realms	Windows	Infogrames	2005
Ultimate Dungeons & Dragons	Various	Various	Windows	Atari	2005
Dungeons & Dragons Anthology: The Master Collection	Various	Various	Windows	Atari	2011
Dungeons & Dragons: Neverwinter Nights Complete	Neverwinter Nights	Forgotten Realms	Windows	Atari	2011
Dungeons & Dragons: Chronicles of Mystara	Mystara	Mystara	PS3, Xbox 360, Wii U, Windows	Capcom	2013

== See also ==
- Role-playing video game
