= List of role-playing video games: 1992 to 1993 =

This is a comprehensive index of commercial role-playing video games (RPGs), sorted chronologically by year. Information regarding release platform, release type, RPG subgenre, game setting, developers, publishers, and country of origin is provided where available. The table can be sorted by clicking on the small boxes next to the column headings.

This list includes all RPG subgenres, including MMORPGs, Action RPGs and Tactical RPGs. This list does not include MUDs and Roguelikes by default, unless they have an additional RPG subgenre. For standalone lists on these subgenres, see List of MUDs and List of roguelikes

== Legend ==
Video game platforms
3DO	3DO	AMI	Amiga	ATRST	Atari ST, Atari Falcon
C64	Commodore 64	DOS	PC DOS / MS-DOS, Windows 3.X	FMT	FM Towns
GB	Game Boy	GEN	Genesis / Mega Drive	GG	Game Gear
LIN	Linux	MAC	Classic Mac OS, 2001 and before	MSX2	MSX2
NES	Nintendo Entertainment System / Famicom	PC88	PC-8800 series	PC98	PC-9800 series
PCD	TurboGrafx-CD / PC Engine CD-ROM²	PCE	TurboGrafx-16 / PC Engine	SCD	Sega CD / Mega-CD
SNES	Super NES / Super Famicom / Super Comboy	WIN	Windows, all versions Windows 95 and up	WIN3X	Term not found
X68K	X68000				

Types of releases
Compilation	A compilation, anthology or collection of several titles, usually (but not always) belonging to the same series
Early access	A game launched in early access is unfinished and thus might contain bugs and glitches or have some of the content missing
Episodic	An episodic video game that is released in batches over a period of time
Expansion	A large-scale DLC to an already existing game that adds new story, areas and additions and/or changes to the game's mechanics
Full release	A full release of a game that launched in early access first
Limited	A special release (often called "Limited" or "Collector's Edition") with bonus collector's material. Often provided to people who pre-order a game
Port	The game first appeared on a different platform and a port was made. The game is like the original, with few or no differences
Remake	The game is an enhanced remake of an original, made using a new engine and/or assets and thus containing completely new sound, graphics and possibly changes to the story and/or gameplay
Remaster	The game is a remaster of an original, released on the same or different platform, with (usually minor) changes to graphics, sound and/or gameplay
Rerelease	The game was re-released on the same platform with no or only minor changes

Video game genres
Action RPG	Action role-playing game	Dungeon crawl	Dungeon crawl	JRPG	Japanese-style role-playing game
MMORPG	Massively multiplayer online RPG	Monster tamer	Monster-taming game	MUD	Multi-user dungeon
Real-time	Real-time game	Roguelike	Roguelike, Roguelite	Sandbox	Sandbox game
Soulslike	Soulslike	Tactical RPG	Tactical role-playing game	Turn-based	Turn-based game

== List ==
Year	Title	Developer	Publisher	Setting	Platform	Subgenre	Series/Notes	COO
1992 (JP/UK)	Advanced Dungeons & Dragons: Dragons of Flame (EN)	Atelier Double; U.S. Gold	SSI; U.S. Gold; Pony Canyon	Fantasy	AMI (Rerel), C64 (Rerel), NES	Action RPG	Advanced Dungeons & Dragons: Dragonlance chronicles	US/UK
1992 (JP/NA)	Arcana (EN); Card Master: Rimsaria no Fuuin (JA) カードマスター リムサリアの封印 (JA)	HAL	HAL	Fantasy	SNES	JRPG/dungeon crawl		JP
1992 (JP)	Bard's Tale II, The: The Destiny Knight (EN)	Atelier Double	Pony Canyon	Fantasy	NES	Dungeon crawl	The Bard's Tale	US
1992 (JP)	Bard's Tale III, The: The Thief of Fate (EN)	Atelier Double	Pony Canyon	Fantasy	PC98	Dungeon crawl	The Bard's Tale	US
1992 (JP)	Cyber Knight (EN)	Tonkin House		Sci-Fi	SNES (Port)	JRPG	Cyber Knight	JP
1992 (NA)	Darklands (EN)	MPS Labs	MicroProse, Retroism brand (2013), Ziggurat Interactive (2020)	Historical Fantasy	DOS LIN (Port), MAC (Port), WIN (Port)	WRPG, Sandbox		US
1992 (JP)	Dragon Ball Z: Legend of the Saiyans (EN)		Bandai	Fantasy	SNES		Dragon Ball Z	JP
1992 (JP)	Dragon Knight II (EN)	ELF	NEC Avenue	Fantastical	PCD (Port)	JRPG. Eroge	Dragon Knight	JP
1992 (JP)	Dragon Quest (EN)	Enix	Enix	Fantasy	X68K	JRPG	Dragon Quest	JP
1992 (JP)	Dragon Quest V: Hand of the Heavenly Bride (EN); Dragon Quest V: Tenku no Hanayome (JA)	Chunsoft	Enix	Fantasy	SNES	JRPG	Dragon Quest	JP
1992 (JP)	Dragon Slayer: The Legend of Heroes (EN)	Nihon Falcom	Epoch	Fantasy	SNES (Port), FMT (Port)	JRPG.	Dragon Slayer: The Legend of Heroes	JP
1992 (JP); 1993 (JP)	Dragon Slayer: The Legend of Heroes II (EN)	Nihon Falcom	Nihon Falcom; Epoch	Fantasy	PC88, PCD, DOS (Port), SNES (Port)	JRPG.	Dragon Slayer: The Legend of Heroes	JP
1992 (JP)	Emerald Dragon (EN)	Glodia	Glodia	Fantasy	FMT	JRPG.	Emerald Dragon	JP
1992 (JP); 1993 (NA)	E.V.O.: Search for Eden (EN)	Almanic	Enix	Fantasy	SNES	Action RPG.	46 Okunen Monogatari	JP
1992 (JP); 1993 (NA)	Exile: Wicked Phenomenon (EN); XZR: Janen no Jishou (JA)	Telenet Japan; Working Designs		Sci-Fi	PCD	Action RPG	Exile	JP
1992 (JP)	Final Fantasy V (EN)	Square	Square	Fantasy	SNES	JRPG.	Final Fantasy	JP
1992 (NA); 1993 (PAL)	Final Fantasy: Mystic Quest (EN)	Square	Square; Nintendo	Fantasy	SNES	JRPG	Final Fantasy	JP
1992 (JP)	Fire Emblem Gaiden (JA)	Intelligent	Nintendo	Fantasy	NES	Tactical RPG	Fire Emblem	JP
1992 (JP)	Ganbare Goemon Gaiden 2: Tenka no Zaihou (JA) がんばれゴエモン外伝２ 天下の財宝 (JA)	Konami	Konami	Fantasy	NES	JRPG.	Ganbare Goemon	JP
1992 (JP)	Great Greed (EN)	Namco	Namco	Fantasy	GB	RPG		JP
1992 (JP)	Hercules no Eikō III: Kamigami no Chinmoku (JA)	Data East	Data East	Fantasy	SNES	JRPG	Hercules no Eikō	JP
1992 (JP)	Hercules no Eikō: Ugokidashita Kamigami (JA)	Data East	Data East	Fantasy	GB	JRPG	Hercules no Eikō	JP
1992 (JP)	Hero Senki: Project Olympus (JA)			Fantasy	SNES		Super Robot Wars	JP
1992 (JP); 1993 (NA)	Inindo: Way of the Ninja (EN)	Koei	Koei	Fantasy	SNES (Port)		Nobunaga's Ambition	JP
1992 (EU)	Ishar: Legend of the Fortress	Silmarils	Silmarils	Fantasy	AMI, DOS, ATRST		Ishar	FR
1992 (JP)	Just Breed (EN) ジャストブリード (JA)	Enix	Enix	Fantasy	NES	Tactical RPG.		JP
1992 (??)	Tōgi Ō: King Colossus (EN) 闘技王キングコロッサス (JA)	Sega	Sega	Fantasy	GEN			JP
1992 (EU/NA)	Legend (EN)	Mindscape	Mindscape	Fantasy	AMI, DOS, ATRST			US
1992 (JP)	Little Master 2 (EN) リトルマスター2 雷光の騎士 (JA)	Zener Works	Tokuma Shoten	Fantasy	GB	Tactical RPG.	Little Master	JP
1992 (JP)	Light Fantasy (EN)		Tonkin House	Fantasy	SNES			JP
1992 (JP); 1993 (NA)	Lunar: The Silver Star (EN)	Game Arts; Studio Alex	Game Arts; Working Designs	Fantasy	SCD	JRPG	Lunar	JP
1992 (JP)	Magic Candle, The (EN)	Japan Soft Technology	Sammy	Fantasy	NES	WRPG	The Magic Candle	CA
1992 (JP)	Megami Tensei Gaiden: Last Bible (JA) 女神転生外伝 ラストバイブルシリーズ (JA)	MIT	Atlus	Fantasy	GG	Tactical RPG	Megami Tensei Gaiden	JP
1992 (NA/JP)	Might and Magic IV: Clouds of Xeen (EN)	New World	New World	Fantasy	DOS, MAC, PC98	WRPG	Might and Magic	US
1992 (??)	Might and Magic Book One: The Secret of the Inner Sanctum (EN)	New World	New World	Fantasy	NES (Port)	WRPG	Might and Magic	US
1992 (NA)	Order of the Griffon (EN)	Westwood	Turbo	Fantasy	PCE	Tactical RPG	Dungeons & Dragons: Mystara setting	US
1992 (JP); 1993 (NA)	Paladins Quest (EN); Lennus (EN)	Copya System	Asmik; Enix	Fantasy	SNES	JRPG	Lennus	JP
1992 (JP)	Phantasy Star Gaiden (JA)	Sega	Sega	Fantasy	GG	JRPG	Phantasy Star	JP
1992 (US)	Pool of Radiance (Advanced Dungeons & Dragons: Pool of Radiance)	Marionette Company (port) SSI (original)	FCI (US) SSI	Fantasy	NES (port)	Tactical RPG	1992: US port release (1991: JP port release)	US
1992 (JP)	Pyramid Sorcerian (EN)	Brother Industries	Brother Industries		MSX2	Platform / RPG hybrid.	Sorcerian	JP
1992 (JP)	Record of Lodoss War (EN)			Fantasy	PCE		Based on the Record of Lodoss War novels	JP
1992 (JP)	Romancing SaGa (EN)	Square	Square	Fantasy	SNES	JRPG.	SaGa	JP
1992 (JP)	Sengoku / Pyramid Sorcerian (JA)	Brother Industries	Brother Industries		MSX2	Platform / RPG hybrid	Sorcerian: Compilation of Add-on Sengoku and Pyramid Sorcerian	JP
1992 (JP)	Shin Megami Tensei (JA)	Atlus	Atlus	Fantasy	SNES	JRPG.	Megami Tensei spin-off	JP
1992 (JP); 1993 (NA/EU)	Shining Force: The Legacy of Great Intention (EN) シャイニング・フォース 神々の遺産 (JA)	Sonic Software Planning	Sega	Fantasy	GEN	Tactical RPG	Shining	JP
1992 (JP)	Shining Force Gaiden (JA)	Sonic Software Planning	Sega	Fantasy	GG	Tactical RPG.	Shining	JP
1992 (JP)	Song Master (EN)	Japan Art Media	Yanoman	Fantasy	SNES			JP
1992 (JP)	Sorcerers Kingdom (EN)	NCS Corp	Treco/NCS	Fantasy	GEN	Tactical RPG		JP
1992 (JP)	Sorcerian (EN)	Nihon Falcom	Victor	Fantasy	PCE (Port)	Platform / RPG hybrid.	Sorcerian	JP
1992 (JP/NA); 1994 (EU)	Soul Blazer (EN)	Quintet	Enix	Fantasy	SNES	Action RPG	Soul Blazer series	JP
1992 (JP)	Tengai Makyō II: Manjimaru (JA)	Red Ent.	Hudson Soft	Fantasy	PCD	JRPG	Tengai Makyō	JP
1992 (JP)	Traysia (EN)	Telenet Japan	Renovation Products	Fantasy	GEN	Tactical RPG		JP
1992 (??)	Ultima: Runes of Virtue (EN)	Origin	FCI	Fantasy	GB	Action RPG.	Ultima	US/JP
1992 (NA/JP)	Ultima Underworld: The Stygian Abyss (EN)	Looking Glass	Origin	Fantasy	DOS, PC98	FPS/RPG (Dungeon crawl)	Ultima Underworld	US
1992 (JP)	Villgust (EN) 甲竜伝説ヴィルガスト, Kōryū Densetsu Virugasuto (JA)	WinkySoft	Bandai	Fantasy	SNES	JRPG	Villgust	JP
1992 (NA/EU)	Warriors of the Eternal Sun (EN)	Westwood	Sega	Fantasy	GEN	Tactical RPG/WRPG	Dungeons & Dragons: Mystara/Hollow World setting	US
1992 (JP); 1995 (NA)	Wizardry V: Heart of the Maelstrom (EN)	ASCII, Game Studio	ASCII, Naxat, Capcom	Fantasy	SNES (Port), PCD (Port)	Dungeon crawl	Wizardry	US
1992 (JP)	Xak I & II (EN) サーク１・２ (JA)	Riot	Riot	Fantasy	PCD (Remake)	Action RPG	Xak: Remake and compilation of I and II	JP
1993 (JP)	3rd Super Robot Wars (EN)	Banpresto	Banpresto	Sci-Fi	SNES	Tactical RPG.	Super Robot Wars	JP
1993 (JP/NA)	7th Saga (EN)	Produce	Enix	Fantasy	SNES	JRPG		JP
1993 (JP)	Albert Odyssey (EN)	Sunsoft	Sunsoft	Fantasy	SNES	Tactical RPG	Albert Odyssey	JP
1993 (JP)	Alcahest (EN)	HAL	Square	Fantasy	SNES	Action RPG, overhead-view		JP
1993 (JP)	Aretha (EN)	Japan Art Media	Yanoman	Fantasy	SNES	JRPG	Aretha	JP
1993 (JP)	Aurora Quest: Otaku no Seiza in Another World (JA) オーロラクエスト おたくの星座 In Another World (JA)	Pack-In-Video	Pack-In-Video	Sci-Fi	PCD (Remake)		Otaku no Seiza: An Adventure in the Otaku Galaxy	JP
1993 (JP); 1994 (NA)	Breath of Fire (EN)	Capcom	Capcom; Square	Fantasy	SNES	JRPG.	Breath of Fire	JP
1993 (JP); 1994 (NA)	Dark Wizard (EN)	Sega	Sega	Fantasy	SCD	Tactical RPG.		JP
1993 (JP)	Demon of Laplace (EN)	Group SNE	Human	Fantasy	PCD (Port)	JRPG/Survival horror hybrid		JP
1993 (JP)	Dragon Quest I & II (EN)	Enix	Enix	Fantasy	SNES (Remake)	JRPG.	Dragon Quest: Remake and compilation of I and II	JP
1993 (JP)	Dual Orb (EN)			Fantasy	SNES	JRPG	Dual Orb	JP
1993 (NA); 1994 (JP)	Guardian War (EN)	Micro Cabin	Panasonic	Fantasy	3DO	Tactical RPG		JP
1993 (JP); 1994 (NA); 1995 (EU)	Illusion of Gaia (EN)	Quintet	Enix; Nintendo	Fantasy	SNES	Action RPG	Soul Blazer series	JP
1993 (EU)	Ishar 2: Messengers of Doom	Silmarils	Silmarils	Fantasy	AMI, DOS, ATRST		Ishar	FR
1993 (JP/NA); 1996 (EU)	Lands of Lore: The Throne of Chaos (EN)	Westwood	Virgin	Fantasy	DOS, PC98	Dungeon crawl	Lands of Lore; Continued Eye of the Beholder series after Westwood Studios split with SSI over "artistic differences"	US
1993 (JP)	Little Master (EN)		Tokuma Shoten	Fantasy	GB	Tactical RPG.		JP
1993 (JP)	Langrisser: The Descendants of Light (EN) ラングリッサー ～光輝の末裔～ (JA)			Fantasy	PCD (Port)	Tactical RPG	Langrisser	JP
1993 (JP/NA)	Lufia & The Fortress of Doom (EN); Estpolis Denki (JA) エストポリス伝記 (JA)	Neverland	Taito	Fantasy	SNES	JRPG	Lufia	JP
1993 (NA/JP)	Might and Magic V: Darkside of Xeen (EN)	New World	New World	Fantasy	DOS, MAC, PC98 (Port)	WRPG	Might and Magic	US
1993 (JP)	Mōryō Senki MADARA 2 (JA)	Konami	Konami	Fantasy	SNES		Based on the manga MADARA	JP
1993 (JP)	Megami Tensei Gaiden: Last Bible II (JA)	MIT	Atlus	Fantasy	GB	JRPG	Megami Tensei Gaiden: Last Bible	JP
1993 (??)	Metal Max 2 (EN)	Createch	Data East	Fantasy	SNES	Vehicle combat	Metal Max	JP
1993 (??)	Might and Magic II: Gates to Another World (EN)	New World	New World	Fantasy	SNES (Port), GEN (Port)	WRPG	Might and Magic	US
1993 (JP)	Neugier: Umi to Kaze no Koudou (JA); The Journey Home: Quest for the Throne (EN)	Wolf Team	Telenet Japan	Fantasy	SNES	Action-RPG	North American release was canceled.	JP
1993 (JP); 1995 (NA)	Ogre Battle: March of the Black Queen (EN)	Quest	Quest; Enix	Fantasy	SNES	Tactical RPG	Ogre Battle	JP
1993 (JP)	Oni III: Kuro no Hakaikami (JA); ONI III -黒の破壊神- (JA)	Pandora Box	Banpresto	Fantasy	GB		Oni	JP
1993 (JP); 1995 (NA/EU)	Phantasy Star IV: The End of the Millennium (EN)	Sega-AM7	Sega	Sci-Fi	GEN	JRPG	Phantasy Star	JP
1993 (JP)	Romancing SaGa 2 (EN)	Square	Square	Fantasy	SNES	JRPG	SaGa	JP
1993 (JP/NA); 1994 (EU)	Secret of Mana (EN); Seiken Densetsu 2 (JA)	Square	Square	Fantasy	SNES	Action RPG	Seiken Densetsu	JP
1993 (JP); 1995 (NA)	Secret of the Stars (EN); Aqutallion (EN)	Tecmo	Tecmo	Fantasy	SNES	JRPG		JP
1993 (NA); 1994 (JP/EU)	Shadowrun (EN)	Beam	Data East	Sci-Fi	SNES	Action RPG	Shadowrun: Based on the novel Never Deal with a Dragon	AU
1993 (JP); 1994 (EU/NA)	Shining Force II: Ancient Sealing (EN) シャイニング・フォースII 古えの封印 (JA)	Sonic Software Planning	Sega	Fantasy	GEN	Tactical RPG	Shining	JP
1993 (JP); 1994 (NA)	Shining Force II: The Sword of Hajya (EN)	Sonic Software Planning	Sega	Fantasy	GG	Tactical RPG	Shining	JP
1993 (JP)	Shinseiki Odysselya (JA); The Lost Mission (EN)	Vic Tokai	Vic Tokai	Fantasy	SNES	JRPG	North American release was canceled.	JP
1993 (JP)	Silver Saga II (EN)			Fantasy	SNES		Silver Saga	JP
1993 (JP)	Tengai Makyō: Fuun Kabukiden (JA)	Red Ent.	Hudson Soft	Fantasy	PCD	JRPG	Tengai Makyō	JP
1993 (JP)	Trinea (EN)			Fantasy	SNES			JP
1992 (NA/UK); 1993 (??)	Ultima VI: The False Prophet (EN)	Origin	Origin	Fantasy	AMI (Port), SNES (Port)	WRPG	Ultima	US
1993 (NA/JP)	Ultima Underworld II: Labyrinth of Worlds (EN)	Looking Glass	Origin	Fantasy	DOS, PC98 (Port)	FPS/RPG (dungeon crawl)	Ultima Underworld	US
1993 (JP)	Xak (EN) サーク (JA)	Microcabin	Sunsoft	Fantasy	SNES (Remake)	Action RPG	Xak series	JP
1993 (JP)	Xak III: The Eternal Recurrence (EN) サーク III (JA)	Microcabin, NEC	Microcabin, NEC	Fantastic	PC98, FMT	Action RPG	Xak series	JP
1993 (JP)	Ys IV: The Dawn of Ys (EN)	Hudson Soft	Hudson Soft	Fantasy	PCD	Action RPG	Ys (noncanonical adaptation of Mask of the Sun)	JP
1993 (JP)	Ys IV: Mask of the Sun (EN)	Tonkin House	Tonkin House	Fantasy	SNES	Action RPG	Ys	JP
1992 (NA/EU); 1994 (DE)	Abandoned Places	ArtGame	CIE	Fantasy	DOS, AMI	Dungeon crawler	Abandoned Places	
1992 (NA)	The Bard's Tale Construction Set	Interplay	Interplay	Fantasy	AMI (Port)	WRPG	The Bard's Tale design suite	US
1992 (NA)	Buck Rogers: Matrix Cubed	SSI	SSI	Sci-Fi	DOS	Tactical RPG	Based on the Buck Rogers franchise; utilizes the Gold Box engine.	US
1992 (NA)	Cobra Mission (眼鏡蛇任務)	MegaTech Software	MegaTech Software	Present-Day	DOS	Eroge		N/A
1992 (NA)	Dark Queen of Krynn, The	MicroMagic	SSI	Fantasy	AMI, DOS, MAC	Tactical RPG	Advanced Dungeons & Dragons: Dragonlance chronicles; utilizes the Gold Box engine.	US
1992 (NA)	Darklands	MicroProse	MicroProse	Fantasy; Historical	DOS	WRPG		US
1992 (NA/UK)	Dungeon Master	FTL	FTL	Fantasy	AMI (Rerel)	Dungeon crawler	Dungeon Master	US
1992 (NA)	Eye of the Beholder II: The Legend of Darkmoon	Westwood	SSI	Fantasy	AMI (Port)	Dungeon crawler	Advanced Dungeons & Dragons: Eye of the Beholder, Forgotten Realms setting	US
1992 (NA)	Magic Candle III, The	Mindcraft	EA	Fantasy	DOS	WRPG	The Magic Candle	CA
1992 (NA)	Pools of Darkness	SSI; MicroMagic	SSI	Fantasy	AMI (Port), MAC (Port)	Tactical RPG	Advanced Dungeons & Dragons Pools series; Forgotten Realms setting; Utilizes the Gold Box engine	US
1992 (NA)	Quest for Glory: So You Want to Be a Hero	Sierra	Sierra	Fantasy	DOS (Remake)	Adventure game/RPG hybrid	Quest for Glory	US
1992 (NA)	Quest for Glory III: Wages of War	Sierra	Sierra	Fantasy	AMI, DOS, MAC	Adventure game/RPG hybrid	Quest for Glory	US
1992 (DE); 1993 (NA/EU)	Realms of Arkania: Blade of Destiny; Das Schwarze Auge: Die Schicksalsklinge	Attic	Schmidt Spiele (DE); U.S. Gold (EU); Sir-Tech (NA)	Fantasy	DOS, AMI (Port)	WRPG	Das Schwarze Auge adaptation	DE
1992 (NA)	Spelljammer: Pirates of Realmspace	Cybertech	SSI	Fantasy	DOS	Space trading	Advanced Dungeons & Dragons: Spelljammer campaign setting; utilizes the Gold Box engine	US
1992 (NA)	The Summoning	Event Horizon	SSI	Fantasy	DOS	WRPG	DarkSpyre	US
1992 (NA)	Ultima I–VI Series	Origin	Software Toolworks	Fantasy	DOS (Comp)	WRPG	Ultima: Port and compilation of I through VI	US
1992 (NA)	Ultima: The Second Trilogy	Origin	Fujitsu	Fantasy	C64 (Comp), DOS (Comp)	WRPG	Ultima: Port and compilation of IV through VI	US
1992 (NA)	Ultima VII: The Black Gate	Origin	Origin	Fantasy	DOS	WRPG	Ultima	US
1992 (NA)	Ultima VII: Forge of Virtue	Origin	EA	Fantasy	DOS	WRPG	Ultima; expansion to The Black Gate	US
1992 (NA)	Wizardry VII: Crusaders of the Dark Savant	Sir-Tech	Sir-Tech	Fantasy; Sci-Fi	DOS	WRPG	Wizardry	US
1993 (NA)	Betrayal at Krondor	Dynamix	Sierra	Fantasy	DOS	Tactical RPG	Based on the Riftwar novels	US
1993 (NA)	BloodNet	MicroProse	MicroProse	Sci-Fi; Horror	DOS	Adventure game/RPG hybrid		US
1993 (NA)	Bloodstone: An Epic Dwarven Tale	Mindcraft	Mindcraft	Fantasy	DOS	WRPG	The Magic Candle prequel	CA
1993 (NA)	Dark Sun: Shattered Lands	SSI	SSI	Fantasy	DOS	Tactical RPG	Advanced Dungeons & Dragons: Dark Sun campaign setting	US
1993 (NA)	Dungeon Hack	DreamForge	SSI	Fantasy	DOS	Roguelike/dungeon crawler	Advanced Dungeons & Dragons: Forgotten Realms setting; utilizes the Eye of the Beholder engine	US
1993 (JP)	Étoile Princesse	Exact	Exact	Fantasy	X68K	Action RPG		JP
1993 (NA)	Eye of the Beholder III: Assault on Myth Drannor	SSI	SSI	Fantasy	DOS	Dungeon crawler	Advanced Dungeons & Dragons: Eye of the Beholder; Forgotten Realms setting	US
1993 (NA/DE)	Forgotten Realms: Unlimited Adventures	MicroMagic, Beyond Software	SSI	Fantasy	DOS, MAC	Tactical RPG	Advanced Dungeons & Dragons; game development tool for the Gold Box engine	US
1992 (DE); 1993 (NA)	Might and Magic III: Isles of Terra	New World	New World	Fantasy	AMI (Port), MAC (Port)	WRPG	Might and Magic	US
1993 (NA)	Quest for Glory IV: Shadows of Darkness	Sierra	Sierra	Fantasy	DOS, WIN3X	Adventure game/RPG hybrid	Quest for Glory	US
1993 (NA)	Syndicate	Bullfrog Productions	Electronic Arts	Cyberpunk	DOS, AMI	Tactical RPG		US
1993 (NA)	Shadow Caster	Raven	Origin	Fantasy	DOS	FPS/RPG	Engine developed by ID software.	US
1993 (JP)	Super Chinese World 2	Culture Brain	Culture Brain	Historical	SNES	Action RPG	Super Chinese	JP
1992 (NA/UK); 1993 (NA)	Treasures of the Savage Frontier	Beyond	SSI	Fantasy	DOS, AMI, DOS (Rerel)	Tactical RPG	Advanced Dungeons & Dragons: Forgotten Realms setting; utilizes the Gold Box engine. Perhaps the first game where an NPC can fall in love with a player character if his or her conduct warrants it	US
1993 (NA)	Ultima VII Part Two: Serpent Isle	Origin	EA	Fantasy	DOS	WRPG	Ultima	US
1993 (NA)	Ultima VII, Part Two: Silver Seed	Origin	EA	Fantasy	DOS	WRPG	Ultima: Expansion to Serpent Isle	US
1993 (EU/NA)	Worlds of Legend: Son of the Empire (EN)	Mindscape	Mindscape	Fantasy	AMI, DOS		Sequel to Legend	US
