= The Forgotten Realms Archives =

1997 video game

- Developer: Strategic Simulations
- Publisher: Interplay Productions
- Platform: MS-DOS
- Release: April 1997
- Genre: Role-playing
- Mode: Single-player

The Forgotten Realms Archives is a compilation of the AD&D Forgotten Realms series from the beginning of the series in 1988 through 1994, including 12 complete games. It was released in April 1997, and re-released a year later as a Silver Edition, which included an interactive demo for 1998's Baldur's Gate, and republished in 2001 as part of the Gamefest Interplay collector's series, Gamefest: Forgotten Realms Classics.

== Game list ==
- Gold Box series:
  1. Pool of Radiance
  2. Curse of the Azure Bonds
  3. Secret of the Silver Blades
  4. Pools of Darkness
  5. Gateway to the Savage Frontier
  6. Treasures of the Savage Frontier
- The Eye of the Beholder series:
  1. Eye of the Beholder
  2. Eye of the Beholder II: The Legend of Darkmoon
  3. Eye of the Beholder III: Assault on Myth Drannor
- And also:
  1. Hillsfar
  2. Dungeon Hack
  3. Menzoberranzan
  4. A demo version of Blood & Magic, including the source code.
  5. A demo version of Descent to Undermountain
  6. A demo version of Baldur's Gate (1998 and 2001 re-releases only)

== Reception ==
Power Play gave the collection a "good" rating. AllGame gave the Silver Edition a rating of 3.5 out of 5 and wrote: "Forgotten Realms Archives: Silver Edition is an enjoyable collection overall. Some of the games do contain technical issues as well as the annoying copy protection features. However, there are enough games that do run without a hitch providing users with many, many hours of gameplay".
