= Buck Rogers: Countdown to Doomsday =

1990 video game

- Developer: Strategic Simulations
- Publishers: Strategic Simulations; Electronic Arts (Genesis)
- Directors: Graeme Bayless; Bret Berry
- Producer: Victor Penman
- Artist: Tom Wahl
- Composer: Tom Wahl
- Series: Buck Rogers; Gold Box
- Platforms: Amiga, MS-DOS, Commodore 64, Genesis
- Release: 1990: Amiga, C64, MS-DOS; Genesis: NA: December 1991; EU: April 1992
- Genre: Tactical role-playing
- Mode: Single-player

Buck Rogers: Countdown to Doomsday is a role-playing video game set in the Buck Rogers XXVC universe. It was published in 1990 by Strategic Simulations for MS-DOS, Commodore 64, and Amiga. A Sega Genesis version was released in 1991. Buck Rogers: Matrix Cubed is the 1992 sequel.

== Plot ==
The game centers on a longstanding war between the Earth-based New Earth Organization (NEO), and the Mars-based Russo-American Mercantile (RAM). The militaristic and dictatorial RAM, backed by a powerful army of genetically engineered soldiers, has been laying siege to Earth for years. NEO, effectively an organized resistance movement, is forced to operate out of secret bases on the surface of Earth and in orbit in its uphill battle for human freedom.

A new party joins the ranks of a desperate NEO. After an introductory briefing, the NEO facility is attacked by RAM rocketships and troop transports. The party successfully locates and activates the anti-aircraft defenses of the NEO base, foiling the RAM attack. Now considered valuable NEO operatives, the party is summoned to NEO's headquarters called Salvation III. For their first mission as a discrete unit, the party is assigned a small shuttlepod and instructed to sweep the nearby area. During the patrol, a derelict and abandoned spacecraft is discovered and the party investigates. The presence of a parasitic infection has killed the crew and infected the party members. Also the place is infested with genetically engineered monsters called Gennies. The sole survivor of the ship's original crew is an artificial intelligence (or DP, digital personality) agent named Scot.DOS living in the ship's computers. After getting cured of the parasite, the party rids the gennie infestation and is able to save the ship which they use as their own called Maelstrom Rider and they return to base.

The party is given some leads pointing them towards the Ceres asteroid in the asteroid belt that encompasses the inner solar system planets featured in the game. A RAM base on the asteroid is awaiting the arrival of the pirate "Talon", who has been sent to rescue the staff from the base due to a series of experimental gennies that have escaped and overrun the base. The team can bluff their way in and claim to have been sent on Talons behalf. In the depths of the base the team discovers that the scientists were attempting to replicate the ECG's first encountered upon the Maelstrom Rider, in addition to working on an unusually powerful laser. After their mission on Ceres, the party's ship is unavoidably crippled, boarded, and captured by space pirates. The party meets another prisoner, Buck Rogers, and manage to overthrow their captors. Buck returns with the party to Salvation and assists them in their escape.

Following this, the player is sent on a mission to Mars itself, to infiltrate the RAM base, Gradivus Mons. On Mars, the player meets the Desert Runners. Prior to the meeting, the player becomes aware of an impending RAM attack on the natives' city, but is unable to earn their trust before the attack begins. After repelling the attack, the party earns the trust and respect of the Desert Runners, and their leader, Tuskon, helps the party infiltrate Gradivus Mons and destroy the Doomsday Laser prototype along with the entire base. Clues uncovered on Mars then lead the team to Venus where RAM has constructed another base and convinced the local population of Lowlanders, to construct components for a super weapon. The player finds that the Lowlander village has been destroyed by RAM troops and only a few Lowlanders survive who assist the team in infiltrating the base and halting further attacks on the Lowlander population.

Ultimately, the party discovers RAM, along with the corrupt Mercurian government, is building its ultimate weapon, the eponymous Doomsday Laser, in orbit of the planet Mercury with aspirations of destroying Earth entirely. After managing to land on Mariposa Three, an orbital city near Mercury, the party makes its way through a military complex and fights through a series of increasingly difficult battles. Finally finding themselves at the command center for the Doomsday Laser itself, the members of the party successfully destroy the weapon and manage to escape the massive explosion. The defeat severely damages RAM's ability to make war with Earth. NEO is, for the moment, victorious.

== Gameplay ==
At the beginning of the game the player creates a party of six characters from a choice of five classes (Rocketjock, Warrior, Medic, Rogue, and Engineer) and six races (Human, Desert Runner, Tinker, Venusian, Martian, and Mercurian).

The game has five view modes:

- Solar System View: The map shows the positions on the inner planets and major asteroids from an "overhead" perspective. The player's spaceship can be moved around in relation to the planets. Ship-to-ship combat is started from this view.
- Overworld view: This is another overhead view, where the player can move the party around on the surface of a planet. Land combat can be started from this view.
- Adventuring view: This is a 3D view that shows the party's environment form their perspective. Land combat can be started from this view.
- Land combat: This is an overhead isometric view of the area that the party is in. Individual characters, NPCs, and enemies are displayed in scale.
- Ship-to-Ship combat: The player sees the enemy space ship. Controls are limited to menus at the bottom of the screen.

== Ports ==
Most versions of the game display the Adventuring view from the point of view of the party (i.e. the display is first-person), and have a simple text menu for spaceports.

The Sega Genesis version of the game shows the Adventuring view as an isometric view of the area indicating the characters behind the party leader (i.e. the display is third-person), and uses the Adventuring view in spaceports. Most of the text is replaced by icons.

The available races and classes are also more limited on the Sega Mega Drive/Genesis version. The player may only select from Human, Desert Runner, and Tinker as races, and may select only Warrior, Rocketjock, Medic, or Rogue as a character class. There are also significantly fewer skills and equipment types available to players as compared to the PC version. In addition to this there is a reduced selection of weapons and ammunition is no longer required for weapons.

== Release ==
Strategic Simulations started up a trivia contest on the Computer Gaming World magazine, consisting of 3 questions about the game. The reader had to answer the questions and send the answers along with some preference details to Strategic Simulations. The first 20 winners won a copy of the game (in their choice of computer format), a board game version of the video game from TSR, a comic module and a T-shirt (in their specified size).

== Reception ==
Reception

Review scores
| Publication | Score |
|---|---|
| MegaTech | 91% |
| Mean Machines | 91% |

SSI sold 51,528 copies of Countdown to Doomsday. At the time, Brian Walker of Strategy Plus wrote that the game "sold like there was no tomorrow", despite receiving "some pretty indifferent reviews".

Scorpia of Computer Gaming World in 1991 called the story "very satisfying" and the game "fun to play". She concluded that Buck Rogers was "good, light adventuring and a nice change of pace from the fantasy line". In 1993, she called it "a surprisingly enjoyable little game" and "a quick-playing game, but fun nonetheless". In 1991, Dragon gave the game 4 out of 5 stars.

Strategy Plus's Theo Clarke found Countdown to Doomsday's engine and mechanics dated, noting that its graphics, limited on-screen text and statistics-heavy gameplay were "far behind" the advances of Ultima VI and other games. He argued that its literal interpretation of AD&D mechanics was "sluggish and artificial", and hoped that the game would spawn a Buck Rogers module for tabletop gaming, so that players could "enjoy the inventive plot without the intrusion of the obstructive computer mechanism".

MegaTech magazine praised the absorbing gameplay. Mega placed the game at #39 in their Top Mega Drive Games of All Time.

Jim Trunzo reviewed Buck Rogers: Countdown to Doomsday in White Wolf #24 (Dec./Jan., 1990), rating it a 5 out of 5 and stated that "Buck Rogers: Countdown to Doomsday is a complete translation of TSR's Buck Rogers in the Twenty-fifth Century roleplaying game. Nothing has been lost in the process. The graphic enhancements, the ease of play, and the variety of action make Buck Rogers a truly enjoyable experience. Join Buck and the NEO in the fight for interplanetary freedom and help the forces of liberation throw off the yoke of the infamous RAM."
