= Scavengers of the Mutant World =

1988 video game

- Publisher(s): Interstel Corporation
- Release: 1988

Scavengers of the Mutant World is a 1988 video game published by Interstel Corporation.

== Gameplay ==
Scavengers of the Mutant World is a game where a tribe of humans dwells in the ruins of Lau, and their young people forage once per year through the other post-nuclear-destruction ruins for anything they can use.

== Reception ==
Scorpia reviewed the game for Computer Gaming World, and stated that "Interstel may have attempted the impossible in trying to create a CRPG with replayability. Unfortunately, it was a rather limited goal for the game and the lack of a definite plotline works against it. In effect, the players end up with a diversion rather than an absorbing adventure. The good idea ends up being torpedoed by everything that comes before."

Bruce E. Wiley for Quest Busters said "Most of my negative feelings weren't the program's fault, but due to my disappointment with the game's failure to deliver on the packaging's promises. Scavengers is a nice, simple RPG that beginners will find enjoyable and interesting."
