= Gateway to the Savage Frontier =

1991 video game

- Cover art by Clyde Caldwell
- Developer: Beyond Software
- Publisher: Strategic Simulations
- Producer: George MacDonald
- Designer: Don Daglow
- Programmer: Cathryn Mataga
- Artist: David Bunnett
- Composer: Linwood Taylor
- Series: Gold Box
- Platforms: Commodore 64, Amiga, MS-DOS
- Release: NA: 1991
- Genres: Role-playing, tactical RPG
- Mode: Single-player

Gateway to the Savage Frontier is a role-playing video game in the Gold Box Dungeons & Dragons series. It was developed by Beyond Software and published in 1991 by Strategic Simulations for the Commodore 64, MS-DOS, and Amiga.

A sequel, Treasures of the Savage Frontier, was released in 1992.

== Plot ==
The game revolves around a party of six adventurers who inadvertently get caught up in a plot by the Zhentarim to conquer the entire Frontier area.

The party starts off in Yartar, having just escorted a caravan from the dwarven stronghold Citadel Adbar (ruled by the dwarf king Harbromm). At the tavern, while the party is enjoying the feast and spirits, something is slipped into their food that causes them to pass out, and they are robbed of all gold and gear, especially the magic longsword that one member used to slay a griffon at Longsaddle. However, each character has a purse of coins under their pillow so they can buy armor and weapons.

- Through rescuing the NPC Krevish, the party being hired by The Kraken in Yartar to assassinate a cleric of Bane at Nesme, only to discover that this evil priest was the only individual standing in the way of the conquest.
- Rescuing the magic user Amelior Amanitas from Everlund, an eccentric and somewhat absent-minded wizard who explains how to stop the Zhentarim. Returning to Yartar, the party is captured and imprisoned in a Kraken base below the city. There, the magic longsword stolen at the start is recovered but the party has to fight four giant squid in a huge tank before escaping.
- Finding four magical statues scattered across the frontier before the Zhentarim, led by a General Vaalgamon, gets to them.
- Traveling to the dead city of Ascore to end the Zhentarim plot.

Zhentil Keep plans to use these magical statues to open a way through an otherwise-unpassable desert for their armies. If successful, the party is hailed as the "Heroes of Ascore", which is carried over into the sequel.

== Development ==
When Strategic Simulations began work on the Dark Sun game engine in 1989 after the completion of Secret of the Silver Blades, they passed responsibility for continuing the Forgotten Realms Gold Box games to Beyond Software. Designers Don Daglow, Mark Buchignani, David Bunnett, Arturo Sinclair and Mark Manyen set the action for the game in an area of the Forgotten Realms that TSR had labeled The Savage Frontier, north of Waterdeep and south of Luskan along the Sword Coast. The area was far to the west of the region that hosted the action for Pool of Radiance and its sequels.

One of the major locations in the Savage Frontier, Neverwinter, spun off a new chapter. Beyond Software gained the support of AOL executive Steve Case to create the first-ever graphical MMORPG, and to base it on the Gold Box engine. To leverage the existing game and cross-promote the titles, Daglow based the new MMORPG in Neverwinter and named it Neverwinter Nights.

The game's principal technical enhancement was the addition of wilderness play, where the party traveled long distances on the map while following the basic D&D rules for combat with wandering monsters.

The game includes character-specific side-quests, with two NPCs who can open these optional missions. The side quests in turn open different endings for the game.

== Reception ==
SSI sold 62,581 copies of Gateway to the Savage Frontier. The title was the #1 selling MS-DOS game in North America in August 1991.

Jim Trunzo reviewed Gateway to the Savage Frontier in White Wolf #29 (Oct./Nov., 1991), rating it a 4 out of 5 and stated that "Gateway to the Savage Frontier earns high marks for graphics, text and depth. The mystery storyline is both interesting and believable but, to reiterate, it doesn't tie you down. The new wilderness style adds greatly to the freshness of the product and proves that there's truth to the idea that 'more is better'."

The game was reviewed in 1992 in Dragon #177 by Hartley, Patricia, and Kirk Lesser in "The Role of Computers" column. The reviewers gave the game 4 out of 5 stars. Scorpia of Computer Gaming World in 1993 called Gateway to the Savage Frontier "standard Gold Box fare ... you've played this many times before".

According to GameSpy, "it was a polished revision of what the early games in the Gold Box series were like, and felt very welcome, to those who'd gotten a bit weary of the far-flung conventions of its most recent installments".
