= Death Knights of Krynn =

1991 video game

- Cover art is based on the painting "Lord Soth's Charge" by Keith Parkinson.
- Developer: Strategic Simulations
- Publisher: Strategic Simulations
- Director: Victor Penman
- Designers: Ken Humphries; Dave Shelley
- Artist: Tom Wahl
- Writer: Dave Govett
- Composers: George Alistair Sanger; David Govett
- Series: Gold Box
- Platforms: Amiga, C64, MS-DOS, NEC PC-9801
- Release: 1991
- Genres: Role-playing video game, tactical RPG
- Mode: Single-player

Death Knights of Krynn is the second in a three-part series of Dragonlance Advanced Dungeons & Dragons "Gold Box" role-playing video games, published by Strategic Simulations. The game was released in 1991.

The story is a continuation of the events after Champions of Krynn and is followed by The Dark Queen of Krynn.

== Plot ==
One year after the defeat of Myrtani, the party, now stationed at Gargath Outpost, has had little to do. The outpost is soon attacked by undead forces. The party's old colleague, Sir Karl, is revealed to be brought back from the grave as an undead death knight under the command of the evil Lord Soth. Soth has been raising dead, great warriors and turning them into his own evil undead forces. His primary goal is to possess the body of the legendary hero Sturm Brightblade. He and his vast undead armies now threaten the land. It is up to the party to overcome this threat.

The party's ultimate goal is to storm Dargaard Keep and defeat Lord Soth. Along the way, it will travel to many towns and face numerous monsters. One particular monster, the Dread Wolf, will taunt the party many times until they finally fight the creature. The party may enlist the aid of the knight Sir Durfey at the Clerist's Tower. He will join and help the party for most of the game.

There are a few optional side quests the party can undertake if desired. The party can gain some extra experience points and usually some extra treasure items can be found.

== Gameplay ==
Clockwise from upper left: overland map; cut scene panel from mid-story; the party in combat with Lord Soth; summary view of a character.

To play Death Knights of Krynn, the player needs to create characters and form a party. The available character races are humans, dwarves, elves, half-elves and kender, while the selectable classes are fighter, ranger, knight, mage, cleric and thief. The gameplay basics are identical to all games in the series. Characters can also be transferred from Champions of Krynn. However, the useful magical items from the previous game will not be retained.

There are some differences in play from the prior goldbox games:

- Death Knights of Krynn does bear similarities to its predecessor in gameplay and graphics.
- Graphics are about on par with Champions of Krynn and everything is still drawn in 16 colors (DOS/C64). Amiga version has enhanced 32 color graphics.
- The Paladin is once again a playable class. It had been replaced by the Knight in Champions of Krynn, though the Knight is also playable.
- Just like Champions of Krynn, the arrow keys are conveniently usable to select menu options as opposed to using hotkeys. Hotkeys are still available for most options, if one desires.
- If a character has enough experience points to train, the character's name is colored purple as an indicator. This was not the case in past games.
- This was the first appearance of the fireball sprite.

There are only two known versions for MS-DOS:

OS	Version	Language
MS-DOS	V1.00	Turbo Pascal 5.5 (exepacked)
MS-DOS	V1.10	Turbo Pascal 6.0 (exepacked)

== Game credits ==
- Created by: SSI Special Projects Team
- Game Development: Ken Humphries, Dave Shelley
- Programming: Russ Brown
- Encounter Code: Rhonda Gilbert, Carolyn Bickford, Cyrus Harris, Terrea Thompson, Ken Eklund, Gary Shockley, Alan Marenco
- Graphic Arts: Maurine Starkey, Mike Provenza, Laura Bowen, Cyrus Lum, Fred Butts, Daniel Colon Jr.
- Playtest: John Kirk, Jeff Shotwell, Mike Gilmartin, Glen Cureton, Phil Alne, Erik Flom
- Music: "The Fat Man", Dave Govett

== Reception ==
SSI sold 61,958 copies of Death Knights of Krynn. It had more substantial tie-ins to the Dragonlance setting than its predecessor, and was well received at the time of its release. The game was reviewed in 1991 in Dragon #173 by Hartley, Patricia, and Kirk Lesser in "The Role of Computers" column. The reviewers gave the game 5 out of 5 stars. Computer Gaming World's Scorpia in 1991 was less positive, stating that "there is a humdrum feel to the game", criticizing the lack of puzzles or role-playing. She stated that "even the side quests begin to look depressingly similar after awhile", and warned that the Gold Box series "has fallen into a predictable rut". In 1993 Scorpia called Death Knights of Krynn "mainly just another chop-em-up".

According to GameSpy, "the game's more substantial ties to the DragonLance universe made it relatively well-received in its day, though at this point, it doesn't particularly stand out".

Ian Williams of Paste rated the game #10 on his list of "The 10 Greatest Dungeons and Dragons Videogames" in 2015.
