= Buck Rogers: Matrix Cubed =

1992 video game

- Developer: Strategic Simulations
- Publisher: Strategic Simulations
- Designer: Rhonda Van
- Programmer: Russell Brown
- Artist: Tom Wahl
- Composer: George Sanger
- Series: Gold Box
- Platform: MS-DOS
- Release: 1992
- Genre: Role-playing
- Mode: Single-player

Buck Rogers: Matrix Cubed is a role-playing video game for MS-DOS developed and published by Strategic Simulations 1992. It uses the Gold Box engine. The game takes place in the Buck Rogers XXVC campaign setting. Matrix Cubed is a sequel to Countdown to Doomsday which came out in 1990.

== Plot ==
The player's party is invited to attend the coronation of a new Sun King on Mercury. They also meet up with Dr Romney, who explains that he has discovered a way to create an incredible source of free energy, one that has the potential to rebuild Earth and challenge the power of RAM (Russo-American Mercantile).

Buck asks the team to find Dr Coldor at Copernicus station on Luna (the Moon). The station is filled with corrupt officials, and a significant weapons manufacturer is also involved. RAM slavers are also operating in the area, giving the player another opportunity to test their skills. The team discovers that their ship has become sabotaged, filling it with radiation, and are forced to evacuate using escape pods. Although the launch kills most of the enemies facing them, Sid Refuge manages to leap on board and hang onto the back fin, where he is later picked up by PURGE (Prevention of Unwanted Research and Genetic Engineering) forces.

The Amaltheans are the descendants of the original researchers that had developed the genetically engineered Stormriders to live in floating cities above Jupiter's turbulent storms. After infecting the genetic tanks with a gennie created by the Stormrider race as a punishment for enslaving them, they are taken to an orbiting gas mining platform deep within Jupiter's turbulent atmosphere. The Matrix Device is about to be ignited when RAM attacks along with an insane Sid Refuge who appears to seize the Device for PURGE. However, once they succeed by infecting the genetic tanks with a gennie developed by the Stormriders, Dr Makali agrees to assist them in building the Matrix Device.

They take Makali to an orbiting gas mining platform deep within Jupiter's turbulent atmosphere. The scientists manage to activate the Matrix Device, thus, ensuring the resurrection of Earth and the eventual downfall of RAM.

== Reception ==
SSI sold 38,086 copies of Matrix Cubed. Scorpia of Computer Gaming World in 1992 criticized SSI for, as it did with Eye of the Beholder, giving the game an abrupt, anticlimactic ending. She concluded that "overall, Matrix Cubed is a disappointment. Aside from the horrible ending, the pieces just don't fit together as well as they should", and inferior to Countdown to Doomsday. In 1993 the magazine stated that the game was "a disappointing sequel", advising those who were not a "real hard-core Rogers fan" to avoid it. The game was reviewed in 1992 in Dragon #182 by Hartley, Patricia, and Kirk Lesser in "The Role of Computers" column. The reviewers gave the game 4 out of 5 stars.
