= Champions of Krynn =

1990 video game

- North American cover art
- Developer: Strategic Simulations
- Publishers: NA: Strategic Simulations; EU: U.S. Gold; JP: Pony Canyon
- Director: Victor Penman
- Artist: Tom Wahl
- Composer: John Halbleib
- Series: Gold Box
- Platforms: Amiga, Apple II, Commodore 64, MS-DOS, PC-98
- Release: 1990
- Genre: Role-playing
- Mode: Single-player

Champions of Krynn is a role-playing video game, the first in a three-part series of Dragonlance Advanced Dungeons & Dragons Gold Box games. It was published in 1990 by Strategic Simulations. The highest graphics setting supported in the MS-DOS version is EGA graphics. It also supports the Adlib sound card and either a mouse or joystick.

== Plot ==
After a prologue set at the Inn of the Last Home in Solace, the adventure begins at an outpost near Throtl, the capital city of the Hobgoblins. The party soon meets a group of Baaz Draconians ambushing some good settlers. After the battle, a greater Aurak Draconian named Myrtani shows up, and steals an ancient book. Myrtani teleports away, ignoring the party. The party then reports the events to Sir Karl. Sir Karl realizes that the evil forces are not at all weakened as was believed, and the party sets out to investigate and defeat Myrtani and his forces.

== Gameplay ==
To play Champions of Krynn, the player needs to create characters and form a party. The gameplay basics are identical to all games in the series, with combat employing a cavalier projection view of the battlefield. There is no character-transferring system in this game, as it is the first. Characters from Champions of Krynn may be transferred to the sequel, Death Knights of Krynn.

== Game differences ==
Clockwise from upper left: overland map; the party in combat; final cut scene; the party is camping.

In terms of its gameplay and graphics, Champions of Krynn has similarities to the Forgotten Realms series of goldbox games. Thus the graphics are about on par with Secret of the Silver Blades, and everything is drawn in 16 colors. The arrow keys are conveniently usable to select menu options as opposed to using hotkeys, which was the only way in two of the earlier Forgotten Realms titles, though the hotkey option is still available for many menus. An innovation with this release was the LEVEL difficulty selector.

Champions of Krynn offers additional races players may choose, including Kender, Qualinesti Elves, Silvanesti Elves, Hill Dwarves, and Mountain Dwarves. In this setting the Mages may benefit from the phases of the moons. Thus, good-aligned mages benefit from the phase of Solinari, for example. Clerics can choose one from a handful of deities in this game, and may receive varying bonuses depending on the choice. Instead of the Paladin, the Knight of Solamnia is an available class. This class begins the game equipped with plate mail, a shield and a long sword, but they must give up some of their gold each time they enter a city because of their vow of poverty.

Draconians are very common enemies in the game, and all five types are seen. The game faithfully implements their death-throes, as they appear in the Dragonlance novels and RPG supplements. In the PC version of the game, any weapons encased in a dead Baaz will be available after combat in the character's inventory screen. The player must then re-equip the recovered weapons.

== Reception ==
SSI sold 116,693 copies of Champions of Krynn.

In the April 1990 edition of Dragon (Issue #156), Hartley, Patricia, and Kirk Lesser called this a game "worth purchasing immediately". They concluded: "We found that this fantasy role-playing game brought new realism to the marvelous adventures we've been reading for the past few years" and gave the game a perfect rating of 5 out of 5.

In the June 1990 edition of Games International, Jamie Thomson liked the simplicity of character generation and combat, and called the game "reasonably entertaining", but also noted that this game is "more of a programmed adventure" than its predecessors, "with less substance to the story". Thomson concluded by giving the game a below average rating of 6 out of 10 for game play and 8 out of 10 for graphics.

Computer Gaming World's Scorpia in 1990 approved of the non-combat activities, but criticized several aspects of the game such as the lack of experience points for unconscious players during combat. She concluded that "Champions of Krynn is a pretty good game overall, but you do have to be aware of its failings". In 1993 she called the game "standard fare for the most part", approving of cameo appearances of characters from the books but criticizing the final battle as "wearisome rather than exciting".

According to GameSpy, while "there's little to find fault with in Champions of Krynn [...] the major criticism was that the game's graphics were becoming hopelessly dated".

IGN ranked Champions of Krynn No. 10 on their list of "The Top 11 Dungeons & Dragons Games of All Time" in 2014.
