= Gold Box =

Video game series and engine

- Clockwise from upper left: overland map exploration; plot cut scene; overall combat interface; dungeon exploration view/battle encounter approach
- Developers: Strategic Simulations; Westwood Associates; Stormfront Studios; MicroMagic; Cybertech; Marionette
- Platforms: Amiga, Apple II, Mac, Atari ST, Commodore 64, MS-DOS, PC-98, NES, Genesis
- First release: Pool of Radiance; June 1988
- Latest release: Forgotten Realms: Unlimited Adventures; March 17 1993

Gold Box is a series of role-playing video games produced by Strategic Simulations from 1988 to 1992. The company acquired a license to produce games based on the Advanced Dungeons & Dragons role-playing game from TSR, Inc. These games share a common game engine that came to be known as the "Gold Box Engine" after the gold-colored boxes in which most games of the series were sold.

== History ==
=== Licensing and development ===
In the mid-1980s TSR, after seeing the success of the Ultima series and other computer role-playing games (CRPGs), offered its popular Advanced Dungeons & Dragons (AD&D) property to video game companies. Ten companies, including Electronic Arts, Ultima creator Origin Systems, and Sierra Entertainment applied for the license. Strategic Simulations, Inc. (SSI) president Joel Billings had, along with many other companies, earlier contacted TSR about licensing AD&D, but TSR was not interested at that time. Although smaller and less technically advanced than other bidders, SSI unexpectedly won the license in 1987 because of its computerized wargaming experience, and instead of releasing a single AD&D game as soon as possible, the company proposed a broad vision of multiple series of games and spinoffs that might become as sophisticated as TSR's tabletop original.

After winning the AD&D license, the number of SSI's in-house developers increased from seven to 25, including the company's first full-time computer-graphic artists. TSR significantly participated in the games' development, including designing a tabletop module on which the first SSI game would be based. Using Wizard's Crown's detailed combat system as a base for their work, the development of the Gold Box engine and the original games was managed by SSI's Chuck Kroegel and George MacDonald. Later versions were led by Victor Penman and Ken Humphries.

=== The series ===
SSI's 1991 catalog cover, showing some of the Gold Box titles.

The first game produced in the series was Pool of Radiance, released in 1988. This was followed by Curse of the Azure Bonds (1989), Secret of the Silver Blades (1990), and Pools of Darkness (1991), the games forming one continuous story rooted in the once-glorious city of Phlan, later encompassing the entire Moonsea Reaches and four outer regions: Dalelands, Cormyr, Cormanthyr (where Myth Drannor is located), and Thar. The original four titles were developed in-house at SSI, and the first three titles were the best selling Gold Box games. A series of TSR novels paralleled the stories in the games.

Released in 1990, Champions of Krynn was the first of SSI's Gold Box spin-offs based on TSR's very popular Dragonlance universe, and roughly in the novels by Margaret Weis and Tracy Hickman. Chronologically, it was the third Gold Box game and employed some innovations that showed up in later games, like the moon phases for mages, the choice of deities for clerics, and the level difficulty selector. The following titles were Death Knights of Krynn (1991) and The Dark Queen of Krynn (1992). While the games give players a chance to meet Dragonlance characters like Tanis Half-Elven and Raistlin Majere, the gameplay is far more linear.

When SSI began working on the Dark Sun game in 1989, all the programmers in-house had to stop the development of Gold Box games and start working on the Dark Sun engine. After Secret of the Silver Blades came out, Chuck Kroegel passed the Gold Box engine and the Forgotten Realms location to Beyond Software (later Stormfront Studios). They set their first Forgotten Realms Gold Box title, Gateway to the Savage Frontier (1991), in the Savage Frontier, an area to the extreme west of the previous games location. Following the events of the first game, Treasures of the Savage Frontier (1992) added a weather system and an innovative romance system between party members and NPCs.

SSI also adapted the Gold Box engine from fantasy to science fiction for a pair of Buck Rogers games: Countdown to Doomsday (1990) and Matrix Cubed (1992). They were based on the Buck Rogers XXVc tabletop RPG by TSR, with rules heavily based on those of the company's flagship game. According to Keith Brors (former technical director of SSI), the company was pressured by TSR into developing their Buck Rogers computer game against their better judgment, due to TSR president Lorraine Williams personally owning the Buck Rogers IP. The games did not perform as well as the fantasy settings, but they do represent some enhancements to the Gold Box engine.

Apart from the main games, Spelljammer: Pirates of Realmspace was launched in 1992. Based on the 2nd edition's Spelljammer rule set, it combined real-time ship combat, turn-based melee battles, and interplanetary trade. Besides the innovations, many gamers and critics took issue with its occasional bugs and lengthy load times.

Sales declined over time, as the engine—originally designed for the Commodore 64—aged, and SSI released too many games (11 Gold Box games over four years). When SSI and TSR extended the original contract expiring in January 1993 for 18 months, SSI was required to discontinue the engine, moving to new developing technologies. In March of the same year, SSI's last release was Forgotten Realms: Unlimited Adventures, an editor that allows players to create their own games using the Gold Box engine. Game developers had access to 127 different monsters, 100 different event triggers, and a framework that could hold an adventure consisting of four different wilderness areas or 36 dungeon levels. It also included a mini-adventure called The Heirs to Skull Crag. An active community grew up around this game, including hacks that expanded its powers and its graphical capabilities.

=== Spin-off to MMO ===
All of the online RPGs of the 1980s were text-based MUDs, describing the action in the style of Rogue or Will Crowther's original Adventure game. Stormfront's Don Daglow had been designing games for AOL for several years, and the new alliance of SSI, TSR, America On-Line, and Stormfront led to the development of Neverwinter Nights, the first graphical MMORPG, which ran on AOL from 1991 to 1997. NWN was a multi-player implementation of the Gold Box engine, and was the most popular features on AOL's service, raising between US$5 million and US$7 million annually to the company from 1992 to 1997. It paved the way for later hits such as Ultima Online (1997) and EverQuest (1999).

=== Closure and legacy ===
When SSI and TSR announced in 1994 that the latter would not renew the former's AD&D license, the two companies described the end of the relationship as amicable. A SSI spokesperson said that the company disliked the license's restrictions. With the Gold Box engine's sales finally fading after a six-year run, the losses SSI absorbed during those two years of delays played a critical role in the sale of SSI to Mindscape in 1994.

Although the interest in the series eventually waned, the mantle of this genre was later assumed by more recent role-playing games such as Baldur's Gate, Planescape: Torment and Neverwinter Nights.

== Features ==
=== Interface ===
The "Gold Box Engine" has two main game play modes. Outside of character creation, game play takes place on a screen that displays text interactions, the names and current status of your party of characters, and a window which displays images of geography, pictures of characters or events. When combat occurs, the screen changes to a top-down mode resembling the one found in Wizard's Crown, in which player character icons can move about to cast spells or attack icons representing the enemies. All the games typically involve long dungeon crawls, and are heavier on combat than on role-playing.

The Gold Box games form a number of series in which you can move characters who finish one game to the next one in the series. In addition, characters from Pool of Radiance can be imported into Hillsfar, a game based on an entirely different engine, and then exported into Curse of the Azure Bonds. The system was improved over time, adding better colors, graphics, more player-class levels, new story lines, and real-time multiplayer gameplay.

=== Platforms ===
Games were released for the Amiga, Apple II, Mac, Atari ST, Commodore 64, MS-DOS, PC-98, Nintendo Entertainment System, and Genesis.

=== Languages ===
The C64 and Apple II versions were written completely in 6502 assembly, and were extremely advanced for the time, since those computers had around 64 KB of RAM. Most of the later ports and releases were written in Pascal. The latest official releases, Pirates of Realmspace and Unlimited Adventures are C/C++ based.

== Developers and ports ==
Although the engine creation and most of the games were initially developed by SSI, there were many official ports and titles from other companies. Westwood Associates was in charge of some ports for the Amiga, which added mouse support and improved the graphics well before SSI's own MS-DOS versions going to VGA display mode. MicroMagic made the only port of the series for the Atari ST home computer, Curse of the Azure Bonds; following this, they developed The Dark Queen of Krynn and the Unlimited Adventures for SSI. Stormfront Studios did all the development for the Savage Frontier series and also the remarkable Neverwinter Nights. Also mentionable, Cybertech was responsible for the development of Spelljammer: Pirates of Realmspace. For video game consoles, there were only two ports: Buck Rogers: Countdown to Doomsday for the Sega Genesis and Pool of Radiance for the Famicom/NES (from the Japanese company Marionette).

== Games ==
=== Original ===
- The Pool of Radiance Forgotten Realms series (developed internally at SSI):
  - Pool of Radiance (1988)
  - Curse of the Azure Bonds (1989)
  - Secret of the Silver Blades (1990)
  - Pools of Darkness (1991)
- The Savage Frontier Forgotten Realms series (developed by Beyond Software):
  - Gateway to the Savage Frontier (1991)
  - Treasures of the Savage Frontier (1992)
- The Dragonlance series (the first two developed by SSI, the last by MicroMagic, Inc):
  - Champions of Krynn (1990)
  - Death Knights of Krynn (1991)
  - The Dark Queen of Krynn (1992)
- The Buck Rogers games (developed by SSI):
  - Countdown to Doomsday (1990)
  - Matrix Cubed (1992)
- Neverwinter Nights (1991, co-developed with Beyond Software)
- Spelljammer: Pirates of Realmspace (1992, developed by Cybertech Systems)
- Forgotten Realms: Unlimited Adventures (1993, developed by MicroMagic, Inc)

=== Collections ===
- Advanced Dungeons & Dragons: Limited Edition Collector's Set (1990, DOS, C64, Amiga, SSI) - a compilation of many early AD&D titles, including several Gold Box games.
- Advanced Dungeons & Dragons: Starter Kit (1992, DOS, SSI) - a compilation of the first games from the three Gold Box main series: Pool of Radiance, Gateway to the Savage Frontier and Champions of Krynn.
- Advanced Dungeons & Dragons: Dragonlance Limited Collector's Edition (1992, DOS, SSI) - a compilation of all of the Dragonlance Gold Box titles.
- Advanced Dungeons & Dragons Collector's Edition (1994, Macintosh, MacSoft) - a compilation of Pool of Radiance, Curse of the Azure Bonds, Secret of the Silver Blades, Pools of Darkness, and The Dark Queen of Krynn.
- Advanced Dungeons & Dragons: Collectors Edition Vol. 1 (1994, DOS, WizardWorks) - a compilation of Curse of the Azure Bonds, Pool of Radiance, and Secret of the Silver Blades.
- Advanced Dungeons & Dragons: Collectors Edition Vol. 2 (1994, DOS, WizardWorks) - a compilation of Champions of Krynn, Death Knights of Krynn, and The Dark Queen of Krynn.
- Advanced Dungeons & Dragons: Collectors Edition Vol. 3 (1994, DOS, WizardWorks) - a compilation of Gateway to the Savage Frontier, Pools of Darkness, and Treasures of the Savage Frontier.
- Advanced Dungeons & Dragons: Collectors Edition (1994, DOS, WizardWorks) - a compilation of all nine Gold Box games above in the individual volumes, on a CD ROM.
- Fantasy Fest! (1994, DOS, SSI) - a compilation of several AD&D games, including Unlimited Adventures.
- Dungeons & Dragons Ultimate Fantasy (1995, DOS, Slash Corporation) - a compilation of several AD&D games, including Unlimited Adventures.
- The Forgotten Realms Archives (1997, DOS/WIN, Interplay) - a compilation of SSI's Forgotten Realms video games, including the Gold Box series'.
- Gamefest: Forgotten Realms Classics (2001, DOS/WIN, Interplay) - a compilation of SSI's Forgotten Realms video games, including the Gold Box series'.

=== Related games ===
- Hillsfar (1989), player can import characters from Pool of Radiance and Curse of the Azure Bonds.
- Order of the Griffon (1992), uses a turn-based combat engine similar to that of the Gold Box games.
- Pool of Radiance: Ruins of Myth Drannor (2001), a sequel to Pool of Radiance series in name and location only.

== Reception ==
With 264,536 copies sold for computers in North America, Pool of Radiance became by far the most-successful game in SSI's history, outselling Ultima V and Bard's Tale III. It was given a score of 90% by Commodore User. The reviewer Tony Dillon was impressed with the features.

The next game in the series, Curse of the Azure Bonds, was also well received. It was given a score of 90% by magazine The Games Machine, and 89% on CU Amiga-64. Dave Arneson, one of the creators of Dungeons & Dragons, expressed his disappointment that the Gold Box games did not innovate enough from previous CRPGs, comparing them to "a cross ... between Questron and Wizard's Crown presented in a new setting".

The final Gold Box game, The Dark Queen of Krynn (1992), sold 40,640 copies. SSI had sold over 1.5 million AD&D products by 1992, and more than two million AD&D-licensed games when it announced the end of the TSR license in 1994.

== On modern systems ==
The games run well in DOSBox on modern operating systems. Also the Gold Box Companion has been developed to smooth out some of the rough edges in the programming of some of the games. Some of the early games, for instance, do not allow turning off Quick Fight, which sets characters to automatic in combat. The Gold Box Companion was included in the 2022 Steam release of the Gold Box games.

GOG.com released the Pool of Radiance and Savage Frontier Gold Box series digitally on August 20, 2015, as a part of "Forgotten Realms: The Archives - Collection Two". Later on October 27, they released the Dragonlance series as part of "Dungeons & Dragons: Krynn Series".

SNEG released the Gold Box Classics digitally through Steam on March 9, 2022.

== See also ==
- List of Dungeons & Dragons video games
