= The Dark Queen of Krynn =

1992 video game

- Cover art by Clyde Caldwell
- Developers: MicroMagic, Inc.
- Publisher: Strategic Simulations
- Directors: Lester Humphreys; Jason Linhart
- Producer: George MacDonald
- Designer: Herb Perez
- Programmers: Jason Linhart; David Blake
- Artist: Carol Tanguay
- Writer: Herb Perez
- Composer: David Govett
- Series: Gold Box
- Platforms: Amiga, MS-DOS, Macintosh
- Release: 1992
- Genres: Role-playing video game, tactical RPG
- Mode: Single-player

The Dark Queen of Krynn is the third in a three-part series of Dragonlance Advanced Dungeons & Dragons "Gold Box" role-playing video games. The game was released in 1992.

== Plot ==
At the beginning of the game, the characters are summoned by General Laurana to investigate rumors of evil creatures threatening the city of Caergoth. The heroes are quickly led to travel to another distant continent of Krynn, Taladas, where the forces of evil are hatching their plans.

== Gameplay ==
To play The Dark Queen of Krynn, the player generates a party of six characters. The gameplay basics are identical to all games in the series. Characters can also be transferred from Death Knights of Krynn.

The game was more combat heavy than the previous releases in the series and there was less time spent in exploration mode. While the tone of the release was epic in scale, ultimately leading to an encounter with the dark goddess Takhisis, the game was marred by significant bugs.

== Game differences ==
The Dark Queen of Krynn is similar to its predecessors in terms of gameplay, though graphics were improved, as the PC and Macintosh version of the game could now display 256 colors. The Amiga version still uses 32 colors.

A departure from many of the prior titles (including the Forgotten Realms games) is that the choice of the character's combat icon is restricted. Instead of choosing parts and colors, a player has some pre-drawn icons which can be selected.

Unlike its predecessors, the arrow keys can not be used to select menu options. Those options are selected using hotkeys or clicking on the menu option with the mouse.

== Reception ==
SSI sold 40,640 copies of The Dark Queen of Krynn. Scorpia of Computer Gaming World in 1992 welcomed the improvements to previous Gold Box games' gameplay, but stated that otherwise "there is very little to like about Dark Queen of Krynn. Playability suffers from a couple of insidious bugs, poor design, and a great deal of gratuitous damage". She concluded that it was "the nadir of the gold box games ... a frustrating exercise in survival that only the most devoted hack'n'slashers would want to experience". In 1993 Scorpia said that it was the "conclusion of the Krynn series, and none too soon ... Only for the dedicated Gold Box fan". The New Straits Times called the game "recycled trash".

Jim Trunzo reviewed The Dark Queen of Krynn in White Wolf #33 (Sept./Oct., 1992), rating it a 4.5 out of 5 and stated that "The significant boost in graphics and sound, the numerous subplots, and the high-level challenge (and be forewarned, this is a tough game) make The Dark Queen of Krynn a standout among S.S.I.'s fantasy roleplaying games. If you've played earlier games in the AD&D line but haven't seen one lately, you owe it to yourself to give Dark Queen a look."

According to GameSpy, "Dark Queen of Krynn was a little bit hard to love, but the level to which it incorporated elements of the DragonLance universe made it worth coping, for a great many fans".
