= Descent to Undermountain =

1998 video game

- Cover art: "Spellfire" by Clyde Caldwell
- Developer: Interplay
- Publisher: Interplay
- Designers: Chris Avellone; Scott Bennie; John Deiley; Robert Holloway; Steve Perrin
- Programmers: Andrew Pal; Robert Hanz
- Artists: Robert Nesler; Kevin Beardslee; Evan Sarver
- Composers: Richard Band; Rick Jackson; Ron Valdez
- Platforms: MS-DOS, Windows
- Release: January 15, 1998
- Genre: Role-playing
- Mode: Single-player

Descent to Undermountain is a role-playing video game developed and published by Interplay. It was released in 1998 for MS-DOS and Windows. Based on the Dungeons & Dragons setting of Undermountain in the Forgotten Realms, it casts the player as an adventurer out to explore the treasure-filled recesses of the Undermountain dungeon. The "Descent" part of the name refers to the game's use of the 3D rendering engine from the 1995 game Descent.

The Descent engine was unsuited for a role-playing game, leading to ballooning budgets and protracted delays. Interplay decided to ship the game in time for Christmas 1997, resulting in a rushed product—although it failed to make even that deadline and actually shipped on January 15 of the next year. The game received very negative reviews and has been called the worst Dungeons & Dragons video game ever.

== Plot ==
The player character is an adventurer who has come to Waterdeep looking for employ from Khelben Blackstaff, high mage of the city. Blackstaff informs the player that people have been disappearing mysteriously, and some return from Undermountain with frightening tales. Blackstaff assigns several quests to the player character so he can find out the cause behind the renewed activity from the dungeon.

It emerges that the Flame Sword of Lolth is buried somewhere deep within the dungeon. Whoever should possess the artifact would gain control of an undead army from the Abyss. The followers of Lolth, the Drow, are seeking the sword. The only way to subdue the power of the Sword is to reassemble the Spider Amulet, which was broken into eight pieces and scattered throughout Undermountain.

Lolth is the final boss of the game.

== Gameplay ==
Descent to Undermountain uses the same game mechanics as Advanced Dungeons & Dragons. At the start of the game, the player chooses one of six different races and four different classes for his character, with multi-classing as an option. These choices impact the player's statistics, which are used to determine the probability of successfully completing ingame actions.

The Yawning Portal Inn in Waterdeep serves as a hub area. In between quests to Undermountain, the player may trade with non-player characters (NPCs) at the inn for goods and services.

Undermountain allowed the player to interact with NPCs, monsters, and the general environment from a first-person perspective. Real-time combat would mix with puzzles to provide a variety of challenges throughout the vast dungeon.

Defeated enemies may drop items or gold coins. Other such "loot" may also be found lying at random on dungeon floors. These collectibles can be traded with merchants at the Waterdeep hub.

== Development ==
Descent to Undermountain was developed by Chris Avellone, Scott Bennie, John Deiley, Robert Holloway, and Steve Perrin. The game is based on the Dungeons & Dragons fantasy role-playing game, which was published at the time by TSR, Inc. Programmers were Andrew Pal, James Gardner, Robert Holloway and Chris Farenetta.

The game partially derives its title from the use of the Descent 3D graphical engine. The game was not the first to bring PC role-playing into a 3D environment: Bethesda Softworks' Elder Scrolls series and Looking Glass Studios' Ultima Underworld series preceded it. However, Descent was the first computer role-playing game to use 3D characters instead of 2D bitmap sprites.

The usage of the Descent engine presented immediate difficulties for the development team. In an interview early in the game's development, creative director Michael McConnohie commented, "The combat is the most difficult thing for us now because the collision spheres used in Descent are further out from your craft, and don't lend themselves to up-close combat. Being able to work those down to the point where you can actually hit a biped with a hand weapon is quite a challenge."

The game was initially designed to include a networkable four-player mode, but there was no time left to implement it.

The cover art, "Spellfire" by Clyde Caldwell, was previously used as a cover art for Ed Greenwood's 1987 novel Spellfire and Westwood Studios' 1992 role-playing video game Order of the Griffon.

== Reception ==
Descent to Undermountain was generally poorly received. The decision to use the Descent graphics engine was cited as a design issue, as it required heavy rewrites to the code in order to support an RPG setting such as Undermountain. According to game designer Eric Bethke, bugs, poor AI, the unappealing and shoddy nature of the graphics, and several other issues have attributed to a general consensus of the game as an example of a title that was pushed to release before it was ready. Technical issues existed in the concept which delayed development, forcing redesigns and re-engineering. Ultimately the "quick change" to Descent's rendering engine proved to be extremely challenging which exceeded the technical understanding of the corporate leadership who were resolved to predetermined delivery dates. This lack of understanding led to a hurried development cycle, and the game was maligned by Bethke as "a classic example of a game that was shipped too early."

Julian Schoffel, in the Australian PCWorld, called the game "woeful", with the hope that the following release, Baldur's Gate, might "redeem" Interplay as a company. GamePro blasted it as having outdated visuals, numerous bugs, and difficult setup and configuration. Though the praised the level designs, they concluded that "you can't escape the feeling that, despite this game's two-year delay, Descent to Undermountain still isn't finished." They gave it 2.5 out of 5 for graphics, 4.0 for sound, 3.0 for control, and 3.0 for fun factor. On the other hand, Ahmed Kamal Nava of the New Straits Times called it the best role-playing game of 1997.

Next Generation rated it one star out of five, citing outdated visuals and a poorly designed player interface, though they said the character creation system is the best recreation of the Forgotten Realms universe in a video game to date.

According to GameSpy, "Descent to Undermountain had only one virtue - it made everybody forget about Gorgon's Alliance and the entire previous two years of atrocious Dungeons & Dragons games."

Interplay acknowledged this poor reception with an easter egg in the computer role-playing game Fallout 2, released a year after Undermountain. The player may obtain a Magic 8 Ball item which typically dispenses advice but also has a few gag lines. One of these is "Yes, we KNOW Descent to Undermountain was crap."
