= Blood & Magic =

1996 video game

- Cover art based on the painting "Deadlock" by Larry Elmore.
- Developer: Tachyon Studios
- Publisher: Interplay Productions
- Producer: William Church
- Designer: Vasken N. Sayre
- Programmers: John Hamilton; Vangelis Van Dempsey
- Artists: David Gaines; Vasken N. Sayre
- Writer: Vasken N. Sayre
- Composer: Ron Saltmarsh
- Platform: MS-DOS
- Release: November 26, 1996
- Genre: Real-time strategy
- Modes: Single-player, multiplayer

Blood & Magic is a real-time strategy video game released by Interplay Productions in 1996 which uses the Dungeons & Dragons license.

Blood & Magic is a real-time strategy game that takes place in a previously unknown area of the Forgotten Realms, and was the first computer game from Interplay based on the Advanced Dungeons & Dragons roleplaying system by TSR.

== Gameplay ==
Blood & Magic is a real-time strategy game, where the player characters are wizards that are able to create monsters with the use of blood magic. The game is set in the Forgotten Realms campaign setting in an area called the Utter East.

Warfare is enhanced by the ancient magical Blood Forges that can create huge armies, as well as create Basal Golems whose mystical energy can power the forge, or they can be used to explore and fight or be transformed into a more powerful unit. The game includes five campaigns consisting of three missions each, or players have the option to run through a random campaign on 15 maps.

The basic units of the game are the basal golems, which are created at the Bloodforge. They provide mana for the production of new units and can be turned into buildings or monsters. When four are placed on a foundation, they may transform into a mystical site dedicated to the kind of magic the player's choosing. Placing a basal golem adjacent to a friendly mystical site will allow them to change into a different creature, based on the type of mystical site. The player automatically is only able to use the weakest transformation, and can unlock more by researching. Researching costs experience, which is gained by creating or transforming basal golems, creating or destroying structures, casting spells and slaying enemies.

While this approach is original compared to the usual Dune II-like system where the player had to harvest or mine resources, it brings its own set of problems. Basal golems are limited to the maximum unit capacity per map, which is 100, and depending on how the player balances their golems with the fighting units, one can reach almost limitless mana production (although a player cannot have more than 300 mana at one time). Because the stationary golems are much easier to protect than moving harvesting units, unhindered exponential growth can easily occur. Also, not having to protect supply routes means less opportunities for strategic thinking, as does the lack of any defensive structures (with the exception of passive walls).

The most egregious deviation from normal RTS gameplay is the extreme micromanagement required for the collection of the game's resources. The golems charge mana individually, and collecting the mana requires a continuous cycle of selecting individual golems and clicking a "transfer" button (or, alternatively, the right mouse button). Golems will eventually transfer mana on their own if they reach their maximum capacity and are left unattended for a long period of time, but this severely impacts their efficiency.

The game's pacing is similar to that of vintage RTS games like Dune II and Warcraft: Orcs & Humans. By comparison, the gameplay is very slow compared to Warcraft II which came out the year prior.

The AI is on similar level as in most other RTS games from the 1990s. It can assemble and send small strike forces quite well, can cast spells, find and use magic items, making it a dangerous opponent in the early game. However, it does not coordinate its defences very well, making the endgame an easy cleanup exercise once the player has managed to gain a foothold. The AI does not abuse the possibilities of exponential growth.

== Plot ==
The single player game consists of five regular campaigns of increasing difficulty, followed by a world conquest (a long campaign during which the player conquers all 15 maps and then challenges the gods themselves). In all regular campaigns the player can choose one of two sides of conflict. To unlock the next campaign, the player has to finish the current campaign at least once. The storylines of all campaigns are typical fantasy tales (without any explicit AD&D references), although each campaign has its own take on the genre. The stories are told between battles by a narrator voice (often in verse) and illustrated by gradually uncovered pictures.

A brief summary of the campaigns:

=== Howl of Vengeance ===
The story begins with a barbarian leader Rathgar the Raider conquering the kingdom of Doegan. With his last breath, the realm's rightful king curses the barbarian. The king's daughter flees and seeks the help of a young necromancer, Aelric the Avenger. Playing as either the usurper defending his new kingdom or as the avenger, the player seeks to either lift or fulfill the king's curse.

=== Matchmaker Mayhem ===
When Roxana, princess of the kingdom of Edenvale, had come of age, she proclaimed a challenge: Any man that wants to take her hand in marriage must first defeat her. The player can choose whether to help Roxana flee from the hordes of suitors or take the lead of Bryan the Bold's armies and win the princess' heart.

=== Tartyron Unbound ===
A classic struggle between law and chaos, with similarities to many stories of fallen angels and balance. Tartyron, the Lord of Chaos, broke free from his underground prison and wants to spread chaos in the surface world. His opponents are the two lords and a lady from the Circle of Order who have exiled Tartyron once and hope to do so again.

=== Nuts and Bolts ===
A campaign with strong elements of comedy. Two brothers, Garrulos the Occasionally Good and Wormskull the Artificier have found a pearl of great magical powers. The pearl is also cursed and causes strife between the brothers. Wormskull wants to use the pearl's magic to create inventions, while Garrulos seeks to stop his brother's insane plans and win the king's favors.

The final scenario of the 'Nuts and Bolts' campaign is an encounter with a special unit called the Juggernaut, which has several features that make it far more powerful than a normal unit. The Juggernaut has high health and defense values, and is immune to harmful effects from magic and items. It also has multiple attacks, including a high-damage melee hit, a flame projectile, and the ability to freely move into spaces occupied by other ground units—with the exception of Stone Golem units—in order to crush them for an instant kill. The Juggernaut is physically large, taking up a 2x2 area of terrain, rather than the usual 1x1 used by all other units.

=== Harvest of Horrors ===
The villagers living in the shadow the forbidden plateau fear the harvest time, as it is then that creatures hungering for human stew descend from the plateau, hunting the villagers. This year the tradition might end, however, as the mage Heradan the Hermit stands up to oppose the dark hordes of the Kingdom of Nix (led by Redfang the Reaper). This campaign introduces new units on Nix's side (Goblin, Harpy and Enchanter) as well as magical cauldron that boils creatures back to mana. The new units are of above-average quality and present a great threat for Heradan. Arguably, the creatures' side of this campaign is much easier to play.

== Critical reception ==
Andy Butcher reviewed Blood & Magic for Arcane magazine, rating it a 6 out of 10 overall. He commented that "Blood & Magic is a fairly easy game to pick up, and plays like a simplified version of Warcraft 2 or Command & Conquer. Everything works in a logical fashion, and there's enough variety in the available units and the individual battles to keep you playing for some time". Butcher concluded his review by saying: "However, it doesn't really offer anything new. If you've played any other real-time strategy games, you'll have seen much of this before, and to be honest, it simply isn't as involving or as much fun as Warcraft 2. In addition, its links to AD&D are tenuous at best - most of the units featured appear in AD&D, but their strengths and weaknesses are different, as is the combat system. Blood & Magic does what it does in an effective and playable manner, but it simply doesn't offer enough to be a great game. There's nothing really wrong with it, but there's nothing that makes it stand out, either".

The Herald-News gave a mostly positive review of Blood & Magic, saying the variety of units and terrain were two of the game's strong points. It also called the game "habit-forming". Weaknesses noted in the review included the enemy AI and the large number of clicks required for resource management via the basal golems. The Buffalo News gave the game a C rating, calling the storyline "deep".

According to GameSpy, "it didn't take long before gamers started to realize that – even as the RTS genre was exploding – there was nothing here that should drag them away from Warcraft II or Red Alert".

== Reviews ==
- Magia i Miecz (issue 38 - Feb 1997) (Polish)

== Source code ==
A demo version of Blood and Magic was included in The Forgotten Realms Archives in 1997. This demo version included all of the C++ source code and asset files.
