= The Journey Home: Quest for the Throne =

1993 video game

- Japanese box art
- Developer(s): Wolf Team
- Publisher(s): Telenet Japan
- Composer(s): Yukihiro Takahashi
- Platform(s): Super Famicom
- Release: JP: March 26, 1993
- Genre(s): Action role-playing
- Mode(s): Single-player

The Journey Home: Quest for the Throne, released in Japan as Neugier: Umi to Kaze no Kodō, (Note: Japanese: ノイギーア〜海と風の鼓動〜; "Neugier ~Pulse of the Sea and Wind~") is a 1993 action role-playing game developed by Wolf Team and published by Telenet Japan for the Super Famicom. The game was scheduled to be released in North America in late 1993 prior to being cancelled.

== Gameplay ==
Duke, the main character, fights in real-time battles on his quest to save Neugier. He can jump and equip armor in an RPG fashion. There is also an ability to push objects, or enemies, into a wall to break them.

== Development and release ==
The Journey Home: Quest for the Throne was developed by Wolf Team. This was one of the first games worked on by programmer Yoshiharu Gotanda, who later helped develop Tales of Phantasia and founded tri-Ace, the team behind the Star Ocean series. The music for Neugier was composed by Yukihiro Takahashi of Yellow Magic Orchestra. He was assisted by Hiroya Hatsushiba, who was responsible for sound programming and sound font creation for the game's audio. Motoi Sakuraba, Shinji Tamura, and Ryota Furuya took the track sequence data from Hatsushiba to create the sound effects. The game was published in Japan by the developer's parent company Telnet Japan on March 26, 1993. The cover features an illustration by manga artist Kia Asamiya. The game was re-released on the Project EGG Japanese emulation service in July 2012. A soundtrack was published to commemorate the game's 30th anniversary by Cassetron in Japan in October 2023.

Telnet Japan's North American subsidiary, Renovation Products, planned to publish an English version of the game and was previewed at the 1993 Consumer Electronics Show. The Journey Home had a planned North American launch for October or November 1993. The project was completed, ready to be shipped, and reviewed by a few United States gaming magazines, but was ultimately cancelled when Renovation was bought out by Sega that year. A physical prototype of this version was submitted to the Video Game History Foundation in May 2021. The ROM image contained a new title screen, publisher introduction, and English text. The game's central location Neugier (meaning "curiosity" in German) was changed to Nogal in the English localization.

== Reception ==
Reception

Review scores
Publication	Score
Famitsu	25/40
Game Informer	8/10
GameFan	314/400
GamePro	15.5/20
Joypad	73%
Nintendo Power	13.3/20

The Journey Home: Quest for the Throne received average scores from media outlets between its Japanese and projected North American releases. Reviewing the import, a quartet of contributors for GameFan all offered similar opinions to one another. They praised its overall presentation and competence as an action game but discounted its RPG elements as weak and its length as too short, with magazine's editor-in-chief Dave Halverson (under the alias "E. Storm") saying that the game is more suited for the players of action games than for RPG players. The staff of Nintendo Power categorized The Journey Home as an adventure game and remarked that even though it contained the involving story of an RPG, the graphics suffered for looking "more like the typical stunted figures of an RPG" rather than an action or adventure game. The magazine also considered its battles "fairly challenging due to the quickness required" while criticizing the difficulty of controlling the player character due to his speed. GamePro writer Lawrence of Arcadia criticized the gameplay for lacking depth and that the amount of jumping required makes the game too hard. The reviewer found that the overhead graphics and sprites failed to meet the standards set by The Legend of Zelda: A Link to the Past, but was complimentary of its music and sound effects. When previewing the English release, Electronic Games positively noted its overhead visuals as "excellent" and called the music "very atmospheric" which "dovetails with on-screen action".
