= Neverwinter Nights (1991 video game) =

1991 role-playing video game

- Developer: Beyond Software
- Publisher: Strategic Simulations
- Designer: Don Daglow
- Series: Gold Box
- Platform: MS-DOS
- Release: March 1991
- Genre: Role-playing
- Mode: Multiplayer

Neverwinter Nights is a graphical massively multiplayer online role-playing game developed by Beyond Software and published by Strategic Simulations. It ran from 1991 to 1997 on AOL.

== Gameplay ==
Neverwinter Nights was developed with gameplay similar to previous games in the Gold Box series. Players began by creating a character. After creating the character, gameplay took place on a screen that displayed text interactions, the names and current status of one's party of characters, and a window which displayed images of geography marked with various pictures of characters or events. When combat occurred, gameplay switched to full-screen combat mode, in which a player's characters and enemies were represented by icons which moved around in the course of battle.

== Development ==
Neverwinter Nights was a co-development of AOL, Beyond Software, SSI, and TSR. It was the first multiplayer online role-playing game to display graphics.

Don Daglow and the Beyond Software game design team began working with AOL on original online games in 1987, in both text-based and graphical formats. At the time AOL was a Commodore 64 only online service, known as Quantum Computer Services, with just a few thousand subscribers, and was called Quantum Link. Online graphics in the late 1980s were severely restricted by the need to support modem data transfer rates as slow as 300 bits per second (bit/s).

In 1989 the Beyond Software team started working with SSI on Dungeons & Dragons games using the Gold Box engine that had debuted with Pool of Radiance in 1988. Within months they realized that it was technically feasible to combine the Dungeons & Dragons Gold Box engine with the community-focused gameplay of online titles to create an online role-playing video game with graphics although the multiplayer graphical flight combat game Air Warrior (also from Kesmai) had been online since 1987; all prior online RPGs had been based on text.

In a series of meetings in San Francisco and Las Vegas with AOL's Steve Case and Kathi McHugh, TSR's Jim Ward and SSI's Chuck Kroegel, Daglow and programmer Cathryn Mataga convinced the other three partners that the project was indeed possible. Case approved funding for NWN and work began with the game going live 18 months later in March 1991.

Daglow chose Neverwinter as the game's location because of its magical features (a river of warm water that flowed from a snowy forest into a northern sea), and its location near a wide variety of terrain types. The area also was close enough to the settings of the other Gold Box games to allow subplots to intertwine between the online and the disk-based titles.

America Online closed down the online game world on July 19, 1997. The company also said it would start a new games channel called World Play, which would cost two dollars per hour to play. Neverwinter Nights was the only game in the company's roster which did not make the transition to the new service.

== Reception ==
=== Critical reception ===
The game was reviewed in 1992 in Dragon #179 by Hartley, Patricia, and Kirk Lesser in "The Role of Computers" column. The reviewers gave the game 4 out of 5 stars. Computer Gaming World wrote that "fans of the Gold Box series know what to expect ... and the human element makes it that much better".

According to GameSpy "with hundreds of loyal players all adventuring in the same city between 1991 and 1997 when AOL pulled the plug, politics, guilds, and alliances quickly formed a social community that was far more important than the actual game".

In 2008 Neverwinter Nights was honored (along with EverQuest and World of Warcraft) at the 59th Annual Technology & Engineering Emmy Awards for advancing the art form of MMORPG games. Don Daglow accepted the award for project partners Beyond Software, AOL and Wizards of the Coast.

=== Commercial performance ===
The capacity of each server grew from 50 players in 1991 to 500 players by 1995. Ultimately, the game became a free part of the AOL subscriber service. Near the end of its run in 1997, the game had 115,000 players and typically hosted 2,000 adventurers during prime evening hours, a 4,000% increase over 1991.

== Legacy ==
Much of the game's popularity was based on the presence of active and creative player guilds, who staged many special gaming events online for their members. It is this committed fan base that BioWare sought when they licensed the rights to Neverwinter Nights from AOL and TSR as the basis for the later Neverwinter Nights game.

NWN gained incidental media attention from AOL tech and marketing staff by appearing in the Don't Copy That Floppy campaign by the Software Publishers Association.

In 1998, development work began on a fanmade clone of Neverwinter Nights called Forgotten World, which opened for play in 2003. As of 2022, though its website and forums remain operational, the game server itself was last online in 2015.

An offline, singleplayer version of the game remained available for download, but it does not allow saving progress since the servers were shut down.

After the release of BioWare's non-MMO Neverwinter Nights game in 2002, a group of former Neverwinter Nights players used the Aurora toolset included with the new game to reconstruct the content of the original Neverwinter Nights and host it online as a multiplayer game, albeit with limited player capacity. Neverwinter Nights: Resurrection was modestly successful early on in drawing former Neverwinter Nights players, but player numbers dwindled over the years as online gaming options expanded and the underlying game technology aged. A post on IGN from the game's host revealed that Neverwinter Nights: Resurrection shut down its servers on July 31, 2012.

In 2012 a single-player conversion of Neverwinter Nights was released for Unlimited Adventures after two years of development.

A number of games set in and around the city of Neverwinter were later released: Neverwinter Nights (2002), Neverwinter Nights 2 (2006), and Neverwinter (2013).
