= Treasures of the Savage Frontier =

1992 video game

- Cover art by Clyde Caldwell
- Developer: Beyond Software
- Publishers: Strategic Simulations; WizardWorks (CD-ROM)
- Producer: George MacDonald
- Designers: Mark Buchignani; Don Daglow
- Programmers: Mark Buchignani; Cathryn Mataga
- Artist: David Bunnett
- Composer: Linwood Taylor
- Series: Gold Box
- Platforms: Amiga, MS-DOS
- Release: NA: 1992; EU: 1992
- Genres: Role-playing game, tactical RPG
- Mode: Single-player

Treasures of the Savage Frontier is a Gold Box Dungeons & Dragons role-playing video game. It was developed by Beyond Software and published in 1992 by Strategic Simulations for Amiga and MS-DOS.

== Plot overview ==
A few weeks after the events of Gateway to the Savage Frontier, the mage Amelior Aminitas magically summons the party (by now called the "Heroes of Ascore") to eliminate the (apparently) last remaining troops of the Zhentarim from the dwarven city of Llorkh. Afterwards, the party is given a seemingly simple mission – to protect ambassadors of the "Lord's Alliance", which holds together the different cities of the frontier. However, the ambassadors are kidnapped, the Zhentarim and its allies (the Kraken Society and the Hosttower of the Arcane) plot to break up the alliance to conquer the region, and the party is framed as traitors.

Much of the game is devoted to having the players attempt to clear their names (usually done by completing a mission in each town of the Lord's Alliance) and alert the alliance's leaders of the plot. The final mission (which does not necessarily fit in the overall plotline) involves retrieving a treasure held by a dragon.

To uncover the plot, the player has to collect two different sets of items:

- Three different colors of crystals held by one of the three enemy groups (the Zhentarim, the Kraken, and the Hosttower). This can only be done by, in melee battles, carefully selecting and attacking different enemies in the right order.
- "Lucky papers" from each city in the game. Nominally good luck charms, when combined with the crystals, these papers spell out the entire enemy plot.

== Gameplay ==
Screenshot showing the new weather system.

Treasures of the Savage Frontier allows players to create characters of up to level 12. Depending on the player character's actions, certain non-player characters can fall in love with him. The game allows the option to increase the number of characters involved in a combat by involving allied forces.

The game's principal technical enhancement to the aging Gold Box engine is the addition of weather to wilderness play. Combat encounters in the snow restrict character movement and add variety to the game.

== Development ==
When SSI began work on the Dark Sun game engine in 1989 after the completion of The Secret of the Silver Blades, they passed responsibility for continuing the Forgotten Realms Gold Box games to Beyond Software. SSI had planned to do only one more Gold Box game (Gateway to the Savage Frontier) before retiring the series in favor of the Dark Sun engine, but when Dark Sun was delayed and Gateway went to #1 on the charts they asked Beyond Software for a sequel.

Designers Don Daglow, Mark Buchignani, Mark Manyen, and David Bunnett recognized that the Gold Box engine was past its prime and needed some kind of story or character enhancements to feel like a new game and not a tired sequel.

Although they added many small enhancements to the game in addition to its all-new story, the largest feature was the first-ever option for either of two NPCs to fall in love with a player character. The sophisticated AI (for its time) tracked the player's actions in the game, much as the modern game Fable charts the player's actions as good or evil. If the player's actions matched the values of the NPC there was a chance they could fall in love.

== Reception ==
SSI sold 31,995 copies of Treasures of the Savage Frontier. It was reviewed in 1992 in Dragon #184 by Hartley, Patricia, and Kirk Lesser in "The Role of Computers" column. The reviewers gave the game 4 out of 5 stars. Scorpia of Computer Gaming World in 1993 stated that the game was "a yawner" and "almost indistinguishable from" other Gold Box games".

The One gave the Amiga version of Treasures of the Savage Frontier an overall score of 65%, stating that "while S.S.I.'s Eye of the Beholder series appeals to a large audience ... [Gold Box games] don't offer anything to anyone who isn't a rabid D&D aficionado. The graphics are poor verging on off-putting, with crude animation, sprites and 3D views, while the sound is probably best left unmentioned". The One acknowledges that "these aesthetic factors are secondary to good gameplay [etc]", but expresses that good graphics and sound improve a game's atmosphere, a belief they further stress by saying that "atmosphere is one of the most important aspects of a decent RPG". The One describes Treasures of the Savage Frontier as "the bastard offspring of [Eye of the Beholder and Shadow Sorcerer] as it features watered-down elements from both".

According to GameSpy, "interest in the Gold Box-style of games waned quickly after its release. For what it's worth, it was a memorable enough closing for the series, and it is remembered as one of the more polished and accomplished of the games".
