= Darklands (video game) =

1992 role-playing video game

- Developer: MPS Labs
- Publisher: MicroProse
- Director: Arnold Hendrick
- Designers: Arnold Hendrick; Sandy Petersen; Douglas Kaufman
- Programmers: Jim Synoski; Douglas Whatley; Bryan Stout
- Artists: Michael O'Haire; Artino
- Composer: Jeff Briggs
- Platform: MS-DOS
- Release: 1992: Floppy disk 1995: CD-ROM
- Genre: Role-playing
- Mode: Single-player

Darklands is a historical fantasy role-playing video game developed and published by MicroProse in 1992 for MS-DOS. The game is set in the Holy Roman Empire during the 15th century. While the geographic setting is historically accurate, the game features many supernatural elements.

Darklands received mixed reviews upon release, with praise for its historical detail and open-ended gameplay, but criticism directed at its numerous bugs and repetitive nature. In recent years the game's reception has been more positive. It was later re-released on GOG.com and Steam with support for Linux, MacOS, Windows OS.

== Gameplay ==
Darklands features an early example of open world gameplay in role-playing video games. The player is free to complete quests that will give them a positive reputation, or to pursue a negative reputation by performing evil deeds. The player's reputation may vary across geographic boundaries, allowing the player to be simultaneously hated in one region and exalted in another.

Travel screen during winter. The game features changing seasons.

The setting for Darklands is medieval Europe. All of the cities that one's party may visit in the game are real places that existed in the Holy Roman Empire of the 15th century. Most are in modern-day Germany, but some are within the modern borders of other countries in Western and Central Europe, including Denmark, the Netherlands, Luxembourg, France, Switzerland, Austria, the Czech Republic and Poland. The cities are referred to in the game by their Old German names, some of which are now exonyms; the new local names are given in parentheses.

There are no other species available in character creation—all players are human and are differentiated by occupation. Any party member is capable of performing what are known as class-based feats in many other role-playing games, but experienced players generally improve the party member's skills only in the appropriate area. Thus, the equivalent of a cleric in this game would be someone who specializes in religious studies as well as healing skills. What the character specializes in does not preclude him or her from learning artifice skills, such as lock picking. Age is a factor, as characters will begin to lose physical prowess as they grow older. However, the older the player is when the character is generated, the more skills and better equipment he or she starts with.

While the majority of the game uses text-based menus enhanced with hand-painted illustrations describing the player party's available actions, the party's movement between cities and during battle uses a graphical user interface. The real-time combat is dependent not only on the characters' skills, but also the type and quality of weapons used against the enemy and their armor. For example, using swords against plate armored foes is less effective than using hammers or maces.

== Plot ==
The game is set in a historical fantasy version of medieval Europe, where monsters and magic actually exist. The plot is nonlinear and there is no set path for the player to follow.

However, there is a main quest to follow in order to finish the game, which involves hunting witches and heretics. Darklands ends once the final battle is completed against the demon lord Baphomet, preventing the apocalypse. Baphomet can be found in a castle in an obscure location of the game which can only be discovered after finding and defeating the evil occupants of various other fortresses around the map. According to the official clue book for the game, the final battle location, as well as the location of some other quests, is randomized at the start of each new game.

== Development ==
Darklands took almost three years to make and cost three million dollars, which was a very large sum for video game development at the time. According to the manual, "Darklands would have been impossible without the faith and vision of the management of MicroProse Software. We originally underestimated the time, complexity and cost of the project by a large factor. When development costs rose past the stratosphere, there was a great temptation to either give up or just 'publish whatever we've got', regardless of quality." An Amiga version of Darklands was considered, but the game was judged as too large to be played on a floppy disk and the potential market of hard disk-equipped Amigas was not substantial enough.

== Release ==
Darklands was released by MicroProse in 1992, albeit with a number of bugs, ranging from minor to major. These included many instances of what would now be called crash-to-desktop errors. Additionally, the "character colors bug" results in the colors of on-screen characters being replaced with random (often bright) colorings. Most of the bugs in the game were correctable by subsequently released patches. Before ubiquitous Internet connectivity, such patches were typically only available through BBS downloads by modem owners and through informal person-to-person copying, and thus many people were only able to play the originally released version. This gave Darklands a reputation as a buggy game.

At least one third-party commercial character editor was advertised for Darklands. Darklands was supposed to be the first entry in a series of games with related settings, but no follow-up was ever made; sales were not high enough to justify a sequel, and the game engine was not reusable. The game was re-released in 2014 on GOG.com and on Steam as a downloadable title for Linux, MacOS and Windows OS. Tommo purchased the rights to the game in 2013 and digitally published it through its Retroism brand. In 2020, the publisher became Ziggurat Interactive, with support from Nightdive Studios.

== Reception ==
Computer Gaming World offered contrasting opinions of the game. Scorpia liked the historical setting and use of religion but criticized Darklands' repetitive encounters and—more seriously—many bugs and missing features, such as the inability to save within dungeons, which, she reported, was a problem given the game's instability. She concluded that "the game ultimately brings little or no satisfaction when 'finished'". Johnny L. Wilson acknowledged the bugs and repetitive nature but emphasized that "I still like the game", citing the importance of skills and an "open-ended feel and an element of free-will that I haven't previously experienced in a CRPG". In 1993, Scorpia called Darklands a "perfect example of a fine idea ... gone wrong" with a "horrible ending", and "not a recommended game".

Despite the bugs, the game was well received by other critics. It earned 4 out of 5 stars in Dragon, which stated that Darklands "is a great adventure and is certainly one of the best multicharacter FRPGs we've had the delight to play. With well-drawn graphics, multiple quests, good character generation, and flexibility in play, the game's detail is phenomenal." Alfred Giovetti, writing for Compute!, praised Darklands for the "multitude of choices you get, which surpass the complexity and historical accuracy seen in any other contemporary computer game" and that its "attention to detail is exemplary". The review concluded "MicroProse should be congratulated for a truly heroic effort in creating a game for sword, sorcery and history buffs." Darklands was nominated for PC Games' prize for the best role-playing game of 1992, but lost to Wizardry VII. The game also won the 1992 "PC Special Achievement Award" from Game Players magazine.

Jim Trunzo reviewed Darklands in White Wolf #34 (Jan./Feb., 1993), rating it a 4 out of 5 and stated that "the size of the gaming world, the myriad options, the huge numbers of character ratings, and the somewhat unusual terminology used to describe coinage, time and alchemy make Darklands a challenging and complex game in spite of its easy interface."

Retrospectively, GameSpot featured Darklands on their lists of "The Greatest Games of All Time". Todd Howard cited the game as an influence on Bethesda Softworks' popular fantasy role-playing series The Elder Scrolls. Darklands was a direct inspiration for Obsidian Entertainment's 2022 role-playing game Pentiment.
