= Dungeon Hack =

1993 video game

- MS-DOS cover art
- Developers: DreamForge Intertainment; Cybelle (PC-98)
- Publishers: Strategic Simulations; Right Stuff (PC-98)
- Designers: Thomas J. Holmes; Christopher L. Straka
- Programmer: Thomas J. Holmes
- Composers: Anthony Mollick; James McMenamy
- Platforms: MS-DOS, PC-98
- Release: 1993
- Genre: Dungeon crawler
- Mode: Single-player

Dungeon Hack is role-playing video game developed by DreamForge Intertainment and published in 1993 by Strategic Simulations for MS-DOS and the NEC PC-9801.

The game is based in the Advanced Dungeons and Dragons world of Forgotten Realms. It blends gameplay elements of roguelikes and the Eye of the Beholder series.

== Gameplay ==
Gameplay screenshot

Dungeon Hack features a three-dimensional, randomly generated dungeon; SSI claimed that "over 4 billion" different dungeons were possible. The game features a pseudo-3D game screen based on Eye of the Beholder series. Like Rogue, dungeons are randomly generated whenever a new game is started. As a result, virtually all dungeons generated by the game are different. However, players can share random seeds used to generate a specific dungeon. Dungeons can be customized for difficulty, such as limiting the number of traps, puzzles, and powerful enemies. Unlike Eye of the Beholder, players control only a single adventurer.

Dungeon Hack uses the rules mechanics of AD&D 2nd Edition. Permadeath, in which all saves are erased upon character death, is an option, like traditional roguelike games but unlike other graphical AD&D games such as Pool of Radiance. Unlike traditional roguelikes, Dungeon Hack has a complex character creation system, but it offers pregenerated characters to speed up the process of recovering from permadeath.

== Plot ==
An adventurer (the player's character of choice) is sent by an evil sorceress on a mission to find and retrieve a mysterious magical orb located within an ancient dungeon.

After defeating the final monster, the ending cinematic shows the adventurer leaves the dungeon with a wheelbarrow full of treasure, the sorceress waiting outside for him. The hero gives her the orb, and she gives him her thanks and says it time for them to leave. The hero remains behind during the credits to sort through his spoils. After the credits, the sorceress tells the hero to hurry as she is leaving and the adventure is over. The hero remarks on his treasure and that his adventure has only just begun, and moves his wheelbarrow off screen dropping a coin, before quickly coming back and picks it back up and goes back off screen.

== Reception ==
Reception

Review scores
Publication	Score
Dragon	3/5
PC Zone	62%

SSI sold 27,110 copies of Dungeon Hack. Reviews at release were fairly positive, though some criticized the game for its lack of plot, or difficulty in finding essential supplies in the dungeon. Computer Gaming World's Scorpia in 1994 liked the game's flexibility and inclusion of all AD&D 2nd Edition character classes and found that "a 10-15 level dungeon is probably the best". She concluded that "in spite of some weak points, Dungeon Hack delivers what it promises: the chance to create your own, specially-designed, hack-n-slash paradise". The game got 3 out of 5 stars in Dragon. Cory Brock of Hardcore Gaming 101 wrote that the game plays it safe by not changing the gameplay of the Eye of the Beholder series, but it is "a solid adaptation of the traditional roguelike".

James V. Trunzo reviewed Dungeon Hack in White Wolf #42 (April, 1994), giving it a final evaluation of "Very Good" and stated that "Hidden doors, invisible walls, trap doors, teleporters, cursed items, magical devices - all the bells and whistles are here. Dungeon Hack is a great way to kill an hour or 12. Elegant in its simplicity, Dungeon Hack is worth your money if you enjoy fantasy, are tired of 200-hour adventures and hack-and-slay is your style."

Dungeon Hack won Computer Game Review's "Most Replay Value of 1994" award. According to GameSpy's Allen Rausch, if "random creatures and meaningless hallways are your thing, you'll love Dungeon Hack – the rest of us like at least a little story to justify our monster butchery". Ian Williams of Paste rated the game #9 on his list of "The 10 Greatest Dungeons and Dragons Videogames" in 2015.
