= Hillsfar =

1989 video game

- Cover art by Clyde Caldwell
- Developers: Westwood; Crosstalk (NES); Opera House (PC-98)
- Publishers: Strategic Simulations; U.S. Gold (Amiga); Pony Canyon (Famicom, PC-88/98); FCI (NES)
- Designers: Graeme Bayless; Bret Berry; Charles J. Kroegel Jr.
- Programmers: Kirk Fitzgerald; Ethan Grimes
- Artists: Joseph B. Hewitt IV; Maurine Y. Starkey
- Composers: Paul S. Mudra; Yasuhiro Kawasaki (NES, PC-9801)
- Platforms: Amiga, Atari ST, Commodore 64, MS-DOS, NES, PC-88, PC-98
- Release: 1989: 1989: MS-DOS, Amiga, ST, C64 1991: Famicom, PC-88/98 November 4, 1993: NES
- Genre: Role-playing
- Mode: Single-player

Hillsfar is a role-playing video game for MS-DOS compatible operating systems, Amiga, Atari ST, and Commodore 64. It was developed by Westwood Associates and published by Strategic Simulations in 1989. It combines real-time action with randomly generated quests and includes elements of the Advanced Dungeons & Dragons fantasy role-playing game. A port to the Nintendo Entertainment System was released in 1993. Hillsfar received mixed reviews from critics.

== Gameplay ==
Players start their game by creating a character. The game provides three choices: players may select a pre-made character, create their own, or import characters from previous Strategic Simulations Dungeons & Dragons computer games, such as Pool of Radiance and Curse of the Azure Bonds. When creating a character, players may determine the character's race (dwarf, elf, human or gnome), character class (cleric, fighter, magic-user or thief), and alignment. Various characteristics of the new character, such as strength and intelligence, are assigned a random value by the computer.

The first-person perspective gameplay of Hillsfar, when the player explores caves

There are two aspects to the game: action, where the player performs tasks (expressed as mini-games) such as searching for treasure and traveling between locations, and adventure, where the player completes quests. The choice of character class affects the available quests, with three for each class. While the quests need to be completed in a set order, "what you do in your time off is up to you", and thus the player is free to explore other aspects of the game.

The game is presented in three modes. When traveling, the scene is presented using a side-on view; once in the town of Hillsfar, the game converts to a "bird's-eye view" of the map; a first-person perspective is employed within the caves. Interaction is handled through what Leslie Eiser of Compute! magazine described as a "bump interface", which allows the player to trigger interaction with objects by bumping into them.

== Plot ==
The game takes place in the fictional town of Hillsfar. There are guilds for each class; Fighter, Cleric, Mage, and Thief. Depending on the class chosen by the player during their character's creation, the player must go to the appropriate guildmaster, who assigns them several missions. Upon completing all missions issued by the guildmaster, they will increase the player's gold and experience points, and the character then retires.

== Reception ==
Reception

Review scores
Publication	Score
Amiga Format	72% (Amiga)
Dragon	3/5 (Commodore 64)

Hillsfar was successful for SSI, selling 78,418 copies. Reviews tended to be mixed. On the positive side, the combination of arcade action and adventure was generally well received. Andy Smith of Amiga Format, in giving the game a rating of 72%, stated that SSI succeeded in producing "a good game that is a distinct mix of two very different styles", while Bob Guerra of Compute! magazine praised the arcade-style sequences, writing that Hillsfar "does a much better job of integrating these high-quality sequences into the story than many others do". Roe Adams of Computer Gaming World gave much praise for the thief's lockpicking sequence, but noted the game otherwise failed to live up to expectations; in particular, Adams criticized both the repetitive horseback travel sequence, and the fact that magic-users and clerics cast no magic during the game.

Other reviewers were less impressed with the overall effect. Lucinda Orr of Amiga Computing criticized the overall gameplay, while she was impressed with some of the mini–games, describing them as "quite entertaining and graphically effective", she found the game generally boring, writing, "there is not too much to keep the interest above critical boredom level".

The game was reviewed in 1989 in Dragon No. 147 by Hartley, Patricia, and Kirk Lesser in their "The Role of Computers" column. The reviewers gave the game three out of five stars. The reviewers compared Hillsfar to Pool of Radiance. They felt that the adventure of Hillsfar lacked depth and was less absorbing than Pool of Radiance, but they considered it "a nice adventure to while away the hours while waiting for SSI to release [the sequel to Pool of Radiance nicknamed] Azure Bonds". The reviewers also concluded that "If you enjoyed Pool of Radiance, you'll like Hillsfar".

Jim Trunzo reviewed Hillsfar in White Wolf #18 (Nov./Dec., 1989), rating it a 3 out of 5 and stated that "If you're looking for something different; if you're tired of controlling six adventurers at a time; and if you're not put off by the arcade flavor of the game, Hillsfar should be an enjoyable experience for you."

The NES version was more negatively received. Brent Walker's review in VideoGames & Computer Entertainment assessed, "The majority of your time is spent gathering gold, which has limited use, and either picking locks or bashing them open. There is also little adventure or strategy required, and I felt more like I was just wading through the game, rather than being pulled into it. Graphically unexciting and mentally uninteresting, I can't find anything in particular to recommend it." The magazine's team of four editors gave it an average score of 4 out of 10.

According to GameSpy, Hillsfar was considered "a failed experiment" by a lot of players.

== See also ==
- List of Strategic Simulations games
