= Forgotten Realms: Unlimited Adventures =

1993 video game

- Cover art by Clyde Caldwell
- Developer: MicroMagic
- Publishers: NA: Strategic Simulations; UK: U.S. Gold
- Designer: Jason T. Linhart
- Programmers: David Blake; Jason T. Linhart; Bill Sloan
- Artists: Eric Halloran; Herb Perez
- Composers: David Govett; George Sanger
- Series: Gold Box
- Platforms: MS-DOS, Mac
- Release: March 17, 1993
- Genre: Role-playing
- Mode: Single-player

Forgotten Realms: Unlimited Adventures, also known as Unlimited Adventures, or by the acronyms FRUA or UA, is a construction kit for role-playing video games released for MS-DOS and Mac on March 17, 1993, by Strategic Simulations.

== Gameplay ==
Unlimited Adventures is a construction kit for role-playing video games, and drew its content from the prior Gold Box engine games, with improved graphics. SSI's contract with TSR, Inc. required the former to stop using the Gold Box engine, so the company released its development tools. Games created by users can be shared with other players who also own Unlimited Adventures. As of 2022, the program still has an active community of users.

The original game allowed the user to create dungeon modules, some editing and renaming of monsters and characters, and to import pictures and monster sprites. However, some art, such as walls, combat backdrops, and title screens, could not be changed in the unmodified game.

Those limitations have been overcome by community-made mods. The availability of these mods has led to the creation of comprehensive "worldhacks", designed to allow the creation of science fiction, superhero, Western and Roman Empire adventures, among others. A program called "UASHELL" applies and manages these hacks and enables the player to apply them.

== Reception ==
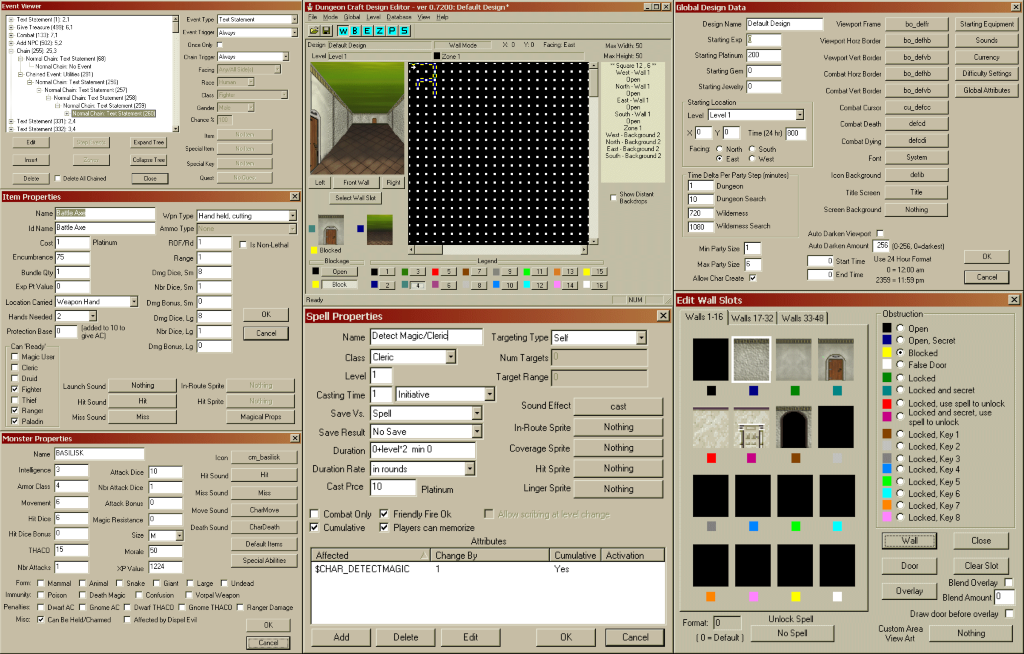
Screenshot of Dungeon Craft, a FRUA clone

SSI sold 32,364 copies of Unlimited Adventures. Computer Gaming World in 1993 called it "the best adventure-construction kit available" despite the "sorely lacking" Gold Box engine. According to GameSpy in 2004, although "the game's graphics were poor [...] and using the tools could be a little complicated, Unlimited Adventures was an excellent tool for budding RPG designers".

James Trunzo reviewed Unlimited Adventures: Fantasy Construction Kit in White Wolf #37 (July/Aug., 1993) and stated that "UA comes with well-written and very complete documentation which includes a number of essential tutorials to give you a feel for design. UA also comes with a complete adventure that you can play and modify. All the scenarios can be saved and played on other computers by your friends. After all, you'll know all the secrets! The fun of UA is in design - both the design of the game and the fun of designing your own adventures."

== Legacy ==
Forgotten Realms Unlimited Adventures is included in the compilation "The Forgotten Realms Archives - Collection Two".

The fan-made game design program Dungeon Craft (originally called UA Forever) is a standalone program that partially emulates FRUA's engine, but with a greater ease of user modification.
