= Secret of the Silver Blades =

1990 video game

- Cover art based on the painting "Bloodstone Lands" by Larry Elmore.
- Developers: Strategic Simulations; MicroMagic (Amiga, Mac)
- Publishers: Strategic Simulations; WizardWorks (re-release)
- Designer: David Shelley
- Programmers: Russell Brown; Ken Nicholson
- Artist: Mark Johnson
- Composer: John Halbleib
- Series: Gold Box
- Platforms: Commodore 64/128, MS-DOS, Classic Mac OS, Amiga, PC-98
- Release: NA: 1990; NA: 1991 (Amiga, Mac); JP: July 17, 1992 (PC-98)
- Genre: Tactical RPG
- Mode: Single-player

Secret of the Silver Blades is the third in a four-part series of Forgotten Realms Dungeons & Dragons "Gold Box" adventure role-playing video games. The game was published in 1990 by Strategic Simulations.

The story is a continuation of the events of Curse of the Azure Bonds. In this game, a small mining town is being threatened by monsters who were released from a glacial prison. The monsters are led by the evil Eldamar, who had been interred in the glacier by his twin brother Oswulf and a group known as the Silver Blades.

== Plot ==
375 years ago, twin brothers Oswulf and Eldamar built a castle in a large valley in the Dragonspine Mountains and the town of Verdigris was founded below the castle. The town prospered under the guidance of the brothers. Oswulf was a paladin and Eldamar was a mage. As Eldamar became older, his obsession for immortality grew and he began studying how to become a lich. Oswulf tried to stop his brother, but failed. Eldamar became a lich known as the Dreadlord.

A horrified Oswulf could not bear to kill his own brother. He sought the help of a band of adventurers known as the Silver Blades to help contain the Dreadlord. The Dreadlord was certain these adventurers were called upon to slay him and he began gathering armies of evil creatures to aid him. The town was overrun by monsters and the inhabitants abandoned it. With the help of the Silver Blades, they were successful in driving the monsters out of the town and back to the castle. Oswulf was still determined not to kill his own brother, however. The Silver Blades set out to research a spell and when cast, it encased the entire valley in a glacier. Everything inside became frozen, but was still alive. Oswulf sacrificed himself so his spirit could guard the castle.

A few of the Dreadlord's followers were beyond the glacier's effects and began attempts to get through the ice, but failed. 15 years ago, they formed a group known as the Black Circle and succeeded in breaking the spell. The glacier began to melt. As the ice melted, many miners noticed the old mines of Verdigris were once again accessible and founded the town of New Verdigris. The mines contained vast amounts of gems. As the miners descended to the lower levels, monsters that had been frozen for over 300 years began to emerge and once again took over the mines.

In desperation, the miners took all their gems to the Well of Knowledge, which is said to grant wishes and provide information for those who dropped treasure into it. The party was then summoned to the town of New Verdigris by the Well of Knowledge at the wish of the townspeople. They need the party to protect them from the monsters and so begins the story of the Secret of the Silver Blades.

The party's objective is to adventure through the mountain region near Verdigris, entering areas such as the ruins of Old Verdigris, the Well of Knowledge, the mines, the crevasses, and eventually to the Dreadlord's castle. The party will face off against an evil group of humans called the Black Circle, many kinds of monsters in the mines and crevasses, and finally against the lich the Dreadlord himself.

== Gameplay ==
The gameplay basics are identical to all games in the series. Characters can also be imported from Pool of Radiance and Curse of the Azure Bonds.

== Game differences ==
Secret of the Silver Blades is similar to its two predecessors in gameplay and graphics. There is no overworld in this game, however. It takes place entirely in the first person maps. Graphics did improve slightly, though everything was still drawn in 16 colors.

The game includes some new features introduced with Champions of Krynn, and adds a difficulty selector that the player can use to change the power of the enemy creatures. The game world was the largest yet for a Gold Box game, and it included cutscene illustrations of the story. It is the first Gold Box game in which random encounters do not stop after a certain point.

Mages have the ability to use spells up to level 7, while clerics can reach level 6 spells.

The arrow keys are conveniently usable to select menu options as opposed to using hotkeys, which was the only way in earlier titles, though the hotkey option is still available.

There are two known versions for MS-DOS:

OS	Version	Language
MS-DOS	V1.00	Turbo Pascal 5.5 (exepacked)
MS-DOS	V1.30	Turbo Pascal 5.5 (exepacked)

== Music ==
Like most of the Advanced Dungeons & Dragons computer games, this game contains only one song. It was composed by John Halbleib, and this was his last game because the developers replaced him with Tom Wahl.

== Reception ==
Reception

Review scores
Publication	Score
Dragon	= 4/5 (MS-DOS)
Amiga Action	87% (Amiga)

Secret of the Silver Blades was very successful, with SSI selling 167,214 copies. It was the last Gold Box game to sell more than 100,000. Scorpia of Computer Gaming World in 1990 wrote "Secret of the Silver Blades could easily have been sub-titled 'Hackmania'" because of the game's emphasis of combat, and stated that it was the most linear of the Gold Box series. She liked the game's story, and concluded that it was "a typical product in the Forgotten Realms series", most appealing to fans of Gold Box or hack and slash games. In 1993, she stated that it was the "most boring" Gold Box game and "for hard-core slicer/dicers only". The game was reviewed in 1990 in Dragon #163 by Hartley, Patricia, and Kirk Lesser in "The Role of Computers" column. The reviewers gave the game 4 out of 5 stars. According to GameSpy, "Secret of the Silver Blades would never reach the "classic" status of much of SSI's previous work".

British gaming magazine Amiga Action gave Secret of the Silver Blades an overall score of 87%, acknowledging the game is very similar to its predecessors, but goes on to state: "The good thing is that they follow on from each other very well. "[Silver Blades is] one of the best RPGs around. If you miss this one then you're a fool". Amiga Action also praised new features in the game such as the ability to port characters from previous installments and new monsters, rating it above Champions of Krynn, an earlier installment in the series.
