= Scorpia (journalist) =

Pseudonymous journalist

- Occupations: Critic and journalist
- Writing career
- Pen name: Scorpia (birth name unknown)
- Language: English
- Years active: 1982–2009
- Subject: Video games

Scorpia is the pen name of a video game journalist who came to prominence in the 1980s and 90s. She is best known for her writing in Computer Gaming World, where she reviewed role-playing video games and adventure games. During her career, she was a popular and influential writer and is now considered a pioneering figure in video game criticism.

Scorpia was known for her harsh criticism of video games she disliked, writing a regular column titled "Scorpia's Sting." She was fired from Computer Gaming World in 1999 and retired from gaming journalism in 2009. She is private and little is known about her personal life. The name "Scorpia" is based on a character she created for a role-playing game.

== Career ==
Scorpia became interested in computers after attending a computer expo. Her initial aim was to become a programmer, and she said she bought her first computer games to learn how to program. In November 1982, while working as a data processing consultant, Scorpia co-founded an early gaming-related Special Interest Group on CompuServe. It became the group's eighth-most-popular forum, and Scorpia received free access to their subscription service in return for maintaining it. As a system operator, she ran online conferences and hosted games. The following year, Computer Gaming World (CGW) owner Russell Sipe contacted her on CompuServe and invited her to write for the magazine. Scorpia agreed, though she admitted she had never read it. She reviewed role-playing video games and adventure games there for 16 years.

Scorpia became a prominent reviewer in the industry. In addition to her writing and online presence, she provided game hints to players who contacted her through a post office box. She became known for harsh criticism of video games she disliked. CGW thus billed her as "controversial" and often published a Scorpia review together with another of the same game by a different reviewer. Scorpia's review of Ultima VIII: Pagan was highlighted by GameSetWatch as one of the harshest video game reviews ever written. Her review of Might and Magic II: Gates to Another World resulted in an angry response from the game's designer, Jon Van Caneghem, who named a monster after Scorpia in his next game. While usually a fan of Infocom, she disliked Infidel so much that she never mentioned it in print, although she did lambast the game by name during an online chat with creator Mike Berlyn.

Scorpia's logo during her time at Computer Gaming World

CGW editor Johnny Wilson described Scorpia as "one of the most refreshing people you could ever meet", and he praised her encyclopedic knowledge of games' puzzles. However, he also cited one example where the two clashed over the role-playing game Darklands. Scorpia wrote a negative review criticizing the game's bugs, and Wilson attached an editorial sidebar with a more positive view. Wilson later acknowledged this was a bad idea, saying that Scorpia's fans correctly criticized him for undercutting her review and overlooking the game's flaws. Because the magazine required a reviewer to finish any game before publishing a review, Wilson said Scorpia favored linearity, resulting in unwarranted criticism of some open-ended works. CGW thus sometimes did not assign her such games.

In 1999, Scorpia was fired shortly after George Jones replaced Wilson as editor-in-chief. She stated that someone intimated to her that the magazine wanted to go in a different direction. She neither looked for further work in games journalism nor received any offers; she attributed her reputation for tough reviews as one possible reason for the latter. Scorpia started a subscription webzine after this, but it failed when she could not find enough readers. Scorpia subsequently started a free website, where she blogged. She stopped updating the site three years later in 2009, after declaring she was unable to afford the new computer that would be needed to keep reviewing games. In a 2019 interview with Kotaku she stated that while she still plays video games, she has no desire to return to reviewing them. She insisted it was "really more work than most people realize", and that she is officially retired.

== Personal life ==
Her pseudonym comes from role-playing games and is based on her astrological sign of Scorpio. In an interview with Arinn Dembo of Gamasutra, she said she was already known as Scorpia because of her work in online communities and found it "more fitting" than her real name for her focus on role-playing and adventure games. She values her privacy, citing that as another reason for using a pseudonym. At CGW, only the owner, Sipe, knew her real name. In 2006, she stated her favorite video game is Ultima IV: Quest of the Avatar.
