= List of role-playing video games: 1994 to 1995 =

This is a comprehensive index of commercial role-playing video games (RPGs), sorted chronologically by year. Information regarding release platform, release type, RPG subgenre, game setting, developers, publishers, and country of origin is provided where available. The table can be sorted by clicking on the small boxes next to the column headings.

This list includes all RPG subgenres, including MMORPGs, Action RPGs and Tactical RPGs. This list does not include MUDs and Roguelikes by default, unless they have an additional RPG subgenre. For standalone lists on these subgenres, see List of MUDs and List of roguelikes

== Legend ==
Video game platforms
3DO	3DO	AMI	Amiga	AMI32	Amiga CD32
APPGS	Term not found	ATRST	Atari ST, Atari Falcon	DOS	PC DOS / MS-DOS, Windows 3.X
FMT	FM Towns	GB	Game Boy	GEN	Genesis / Mega Drive
GG	Game Gear	iOS	iOS, iPhone, iPod, iPadOS, iPad, visionOS, Apple Vision Pro	MAC	Classic Mac OS, 2001 and before
MSX2	MSX2	NES	Nintendo Entertainment System / Famicom	PC98	PC-9800 series
PCD	TurboGrafx-CD / PC Engine CD-ROM²	PCE	TurboGrafx-16 / PC Engine	PS1	PlayStation 1
SAT	Sega Saturn	SCD	Sega CD / Mega-CD	SNES	Super NES / Super Famicom / Super Comboy
X68K	X68000	WIN	Windows, all versions Windows 95 and up	WIN9X	Term not found

Types of releases
Compilation	A compilation, anthology or collection of several titles, usually (but not always) belonging to the same series
Early access	A game launched in early access is unfinished and thus might contain bugs and glitches or have some of the content missing
Episodic	An episodic video game that is released in batches over a period of time
Expansion	A large-scale DLC to an already existing game that adds new story, areas and additions and/or changes to the game's mechanics
Full release	A full release of a game that launched in early access first
Limited	A special release (often called "Limited" or "Collector's Edition") with bonus collector's material. Often provided to people who pre-order a game
Port	The game first appeared on a different platform and a port was made. The game is like the original, with few or no differences
Remake	The game is an enhanced remake of an original, made using a new engine and/or assets and thus containing completely new sound, graphics and possibly changes to the story and/or gameplay
Remaster	The game is a remaster of an original, released on the same or different platform, with (usually minor) changes to graphics, sound and/or gameplay
Rerelease	The game was re-released on the same platform with no or only minor changes

Video game genres
Action RPG	Action role-playing game	Dungeon crawl	Dungeon crawl	JRPG	Japanese-style role-playing game
MMORPG	Massively multiplayer online RPG	Monster tamer	Monster-taming game	MUD	Multi-user dungeon
Real-time	Real-time game	Roguelike	Roguelike, Roguelite	Sandbox	Sandbox game
Soulslike	Soulslike	Tactical RPG	Tactical role-playing game	Turn-based	Turn-based game

== List ==
Year	Title	Developer	Publisher	Setting	Platform	Subgenre	Series/Notes	COO
1994 (NA)	AD&D Collector's Edition	SSI	WizardWorks	Fantasy	DOS	Tactical RPG	Gold Box: Compilation of all nine games Dungeons & Dragons franchise	NA
1994 (NA)	AD&D Collectors Edition Vol. 3	SSI	SSI	Fantasy	DOS	Tactical RPG	Gold Box: Compilation of three games Dungeons & Dragons franchise	NA
1994 (NA); 1995 (EU/JP)	Advanced Dungeons & Dragons: Slayer	Lion Entertainment	NA: Strategic Simulations; EU: Mindscape; JP: T&E Soft	Fantasy	3DO	Action RPG	Dungeon crawl game	NA
1994 (NA)	The Aethra Chronicles	Michael Lawrence		Fantasy	DOS	CRPG	Shareware game; based on Rolemaster	NA
1994 (JP)	After Armageddon Gaiden: Majū Tōshōden Eclipse	Pandora Box	Sega	Post-apocalyptic/Fantasy	SCD	JRPG	Last Armageddon	JP
1994 (JP)	Albert Odyssey 2: Jashin no Taidou	Sunsoft	Sunsoft	Fantasy	SNES	Tactical RPG	Albert Odyssey	JP
1994 (NA/EU)	Al-Qadim: The Genie's Curse	Cyberlore	SSI	Fantasy	DOS	Action RPG	Dungeons & Dragons franchise	NA
1994 (NA/EU)	Alien Logic: A Skyrealms of Jorune Adventure	Ceridus	SSI	Sci-Fi; Fantasy	DOS	WRPG	Skyrealms of Jorune franchise	NA
1995 (NA)	Anvil of Dawn	DreamForge Intertainment	New World Computing	Fantasy	DOS, WIN	CRPG	Named the best RPG of 1995 by Computer Gaming World and Computer Game Review.	NA
1994 (JP)	Aretha 2	Japan Art Media	Yanoman	Fantasy	SNES	JRPG	Aretha	JP
1994 (JP)	Arunamu No Kiba Juuzokujuu Nishinto Densetsu (JA); Fang of Alnam (EN) アルナムの牙 獣族十二神徒伝説 (JA)	Right Stuff		Fantasy	PCD		Fang of Alnam	JP
1995 (NA/EU)	BioForge	Origin Systems	Electronic Arts	Sci-Fi Cyberpunk Horror	DOS, WIN9X	CRPG		USA
1994 (NA)	BloodNet	MicroProse	MicroProse	Sci-Fi; Horror	AMI (Port)	Adventure/RPG hybrid		NA
1994 (JP); 1995 (NA)	Brandish	Nihon Falcom	Koei	Fantasy	DOS (Port), SNES (Port)	Action RPG	Brandish	JP
1994 (JP); 1995 (NA); 1996 (EU)	Breath of Fire II	Capcom	Capcom; Laguna	Fantasy	SNES	JRPG	Breath of Fire	JP
1994 (NA)	Complete Ultima VII, The	Origin	EA	Fantasy	DOS (Comp)	WRPG	Ultima	NA
1994 (JP)	Cyber Knight II: Chikyū Teikoku no Yabō	Atelier Double	Tonkin House	Sci-Fi	SNES	JRPG	Cyber Knight	JP
1994 (JP)	Daikaijuu Monogatari (JA) 大貝獣物語 (JA)	Hudson Soft	Hudson Soft	Fantasy	SNES	JRPG	Kaijuu Monogatari	JP
1994 (JP)	Dark Kingdom	Telenet Japan	Telenet Japan	Fantasy	SNES	JRPG		JP
1994 (NA)	Dark Sun: Wake of the Ravager	SSI	SSI; Mindscape	Fantasy	DOS	Tactical RPG	Dungeons & Dragons franchise: Dark Sun Campaign Setting: Sequel to Dark Sun: Shattered Lands	NA
1994 (JP)	Down the World: Mervil's Ambition	ASCII	Susumu Matsushita	Fantasy	SNES	JRPG		JP
1994 (JP/NA)	Dragon Knight III (EN); Knights of Xentar (EN) ドラゴンナイト3 (JA)	ELF	Megatech	Fantasy	PCD, DOS	JRPG; Eroge	Dragon Knight	JP
1994 (JP)	Dragon Knight IV (EN) ドラゴンナイト4 (JA)	ELF	ELF	Fantasy	PC98, FMT (Port), X68K (Port), DOS (Port)	Tactical RPG; Eroge	Dragon Knight	JP
1994 (JP)	Dragon Slayer: The Legend of Heroes	Sega Falcom	Sega	Fantasy	GEN (Port)	JRPG	Dragon Slayer: The Legend of Heroes	JP
1994 (WW)	Dragonstone	Core Design	Core Design	Fantasy	AMI	Action RPG		GB
1994 (JP)	Dream Maze			Fantasy	SNES			JP
1994 (JP)	Dual Orb II	I'Max	I'Max	Fantasy	SNES	JRPG	Dual Orb	JP
1994 (JP); 1995 (NA)	EarthBound (EN)	Ape; HAL	Nintendo	Modern; Fantasy	SNES	JRPG	Mother	JP
1994 (NA)	Elder Scrolls, The: Arena	Bethesda	Bethesda	Fantasy	DOS	Action RPG (UU style)	The Elder Scrolls	NA
1994 (NA)	Elder Scrolls, The: Arena – Deluxe Edition	Bethesda	Bethesda	Fantasy	DOS (Rerel)	Action RPG (UU style)	The Elder Scrolls	NA
1994 (JP)	Emerald Dragon	Alfa System; Right Stuff	NEC	Fantasy	PCD (Port)	JRPG	Emerald Dragon	JP
1994 (JP/NA)	Eye of the Beholder			Fantasy	SNES (Port), SCD (Port)	Action RPG (DM style)	Dungeons and Dragons franchise; Eye of the Beholder	NA
1994 (NA)	Fantasy Fest!	Various	SSI	Fantasy	DOS (Comp)	Action RPG; Tactical RPG; Strategy game	Compilation of Dungeon Hack, FRUA, Fantasy Empires and Stronghold	NA
1994 (JP)	Farland Story 4: Shirogane no Tsubasa	TGL	TGL	Fantasy	DOS	Tactical RPG	Farland Story	JP
1994 (JP)	Farland Story 3: Tenshi no Namida	TGL	TGL	Fantasy	DOS	Tactical RPG	Farland Story	JP
1994 (JP)	FEDA: Emblem of Justice	Max Entertainment	Yanoman	Fantasy	SNES	Tactical RPG	FEDA series	JP
1994 (JP)	Final Fantasy I-II	Square	Square	Fantasy	NES	JRPG	Final Fantasy	JP
1994 (JP/NA)	Final Fantasy VI	Square	Square	Fantasy; Sci-Fi	SNES	JRPG	Final Fantasy	JP
1994 (JP)	Fire Emblem: Monshō no Nazo	Intelligent	Nintendo	Fantasy	SNES	Tactical RPG	Fire Emblem	JP
1994 (JP)	Fray CD: Xak Gaiden (JA) フレイＣＤ －サーク外伝－ (JA)	Micro Cabin	Micro Cabin	Fantasy	PCD (Port)	Action RPG	Xak	JP
1994 (JP)	Gaia Savior: Hero Saidai no Sakusen (JA) ガイアセイバー ヒーロー最大の作戦 (JA)		Banpresto	Fantasy	SNES			JP
1994 (JP)	Hercules no Eikō IV: Kamigami kara no Okurimono	Data East	Data East	Fantasy	SNES	JRPG	Glory of Heracles	JP
1994 (JP)	Hiouden: Legend of the Scarlet King	Wolf Team	Telenet Japan	Fantasy	SNES	TBS/RPG hybrid	Hiōden	JP
1994 (JP)	Idea no Hi (JA) イデアの日 (JA)	Office Koukan	Shouei System	Fantasy	SNES			JP
1994 (EU)	Ishar 3: The Seven Gates of Infinity	Silmarils	Silmarils	Fantasy	AMI, DOS, MAC, ATRST	CRPG	Ishar	FR
1994 (??)	J.R.R. Tolkien's The Lord of the Rings, Vol. I	Interplay	Interplay	Fantasy	SNES	Tactical RPG	Based on The Lord of the Rings	NA
1994 (NA)	Jagged Alliance	Madlab	Sir-Tech	Modern	DOS	Tactical RPG	Jagged Alliance	NA
1994 (JP)	Kabuki Rocks (EN) カブキロックス (JA)		Atlus	Fantasy; Historical	SNES			JP
1994 (JP)	Kenyuu Densetsu Yaiba			Fantasy	SNES	Action RPG		JP
1994 (JP)	King's Field	From		Fantasy	PS1	JRPG	King's Field	JP
1994 (JP)	Kijin Kourinden ONI (JA) 鬼神降臨伝ONI (JA)	Pandora Box	Banpresto	Fantasy	SNES		ONI series	JP
1994 (JP)	Kurokishi no Kamen			Fantasy	3DO			JP
1994 (JP)	Langrisser II (EN); Der Langrisser (EN) デア ラングリッサー (JA)	CareerSoft	NCS	Fantasy	GEN	Tactical RPG	Langrisser	JP
1994 (JP)	Legend of Heroes III, The: Prophecy of the Moonlight Witch (EN) 英雄伝説III「白き魔女」-もうひとつの英雄たちの物語- (JA)	Nihon Falcom	Nihon Falcom	Fantasy	PC98		Dragon Slayer: The Legend of Heroes	JP
1994 (JP)	Legend of Xanadu	Nihon Falcom	NEC Home Electronics	Fantasy	PCD	Action RPG	Legend of Xanadu	JP
1994 (JP)	Little Master: Niji Iro no Maseki (EN) リトルマスター～虹色の魔石 (JA)	Tokuma Shoten	Tokuma Shoten	Fantasy	SNES	Tactical RPG	Little Master	JP
1994 (JP)	Live a Live	Square	Square	Multi-genre	SNES	Tactical RPG; Action RPG		JP
1994 (JP); 1995 (NA)	Lunar Eternal Blue (EN)	Studio Alex	Game Arts; Working Designs	Fantasy	SCD	JRPG	Lunar	JP
1994 (JP)	Magna Braban: Henreki no Yusha	Lenar Corporation	Ask Kodansha	Fantasy	SNES	JRPG		JP
1994 (JP)	Majin Tensei (JA) 魔神転生 (JA)	Atlus	Atlus	Fantasy	SNES	Tactical RPG	Megami Tensei; Majin Tensei	JP
1994 (NA)	Menzoberranzan	DreamForge	SSI	Fantasy	DOS	WRPG	Dungeons & Dragons franchise: Forgotten Realms setting	NA
1994 (NA)	Might and Magic III: Isles of Terra	New World	New World	Fantasy	SNES (Port), SCD (Port)	WRPG	Might and Magic	NA
1994 (NA)	Might and Magic: World of Xeen	New World	New World	Fantasy	DOS	WRPG	Might and Magic: Compilation of IV and V	NA
1994 (NA)	Obitus	Scenario Developments	Bullet-Proof	Fantasy	SNES (Port)	WRPG; Action RPG		UK
1994 (JP)	Oni IV: Kishin no Ketsuzoku (JA); ONI IV -鬼神の血族- (JA)	Pandora Box	Banpresto	Fantasy	GB		Oni series	JP
1994 (JP)	Popful Mail	Nihon Falcom (SNES); Sega Falcom (SCD); HuneX (PCE)	Nihon Falcom (SNES); Sega (SCD, JP); Working Designs (SCD, US); NEC Home Electronics (PCE)	Fantasy	PCE, SNES, SCD	Action RPG (Platformer)		JP
1994 (??)	Power of the Hired			Fantasy	WIN (Port)	Tactical RPG		
1994 (NA)	Ravenloft: Strahd's Possession	DreamForge	SSI	Fantasy	DOS	WRPG	Dungeons & Dragons franchise: Ravenloft campaign setting	NA
1994 (DE/NA/EU)	Realms of Arkania: Star Trail (EN); Das Schwarze Auge: Sternenschweif (DE)	Attic	Schmidt Spiele (DE); U.S. Gold (EU); Sir-Tech (NA)	Fantasy	DOS	Tactical RPG	Das Schwarze Auge franchise	DE
1994 (NA)-2002 (NA)	Realmz	Fantasoft	Fantasoft	Fantasy	MAC, WIN	Tactical RPG	Realmz	NA
1994 (JP)	Record of Lodoss War	Humming Bird Soft	Sega	Fantasy	SCD	Tactical RPG	Record of Lodoss War franchise	JP
1994 (JP)	Record of Lodoss War 2	Humming Bird Soft	Hudson Soft	Fantasy	PCE	Tactical RPG	Record of Lodoss War franchise; based on Chronicles of the Heroic Knight	JP
1994 (??)	The Red Crystal: The Seven Secrets of Life	QQP		Fantasy	DOS	Tactical RPG		
1994 (JP); 1995 (NA)	Robotrek (EN)	Quintet; Ancient	Enix	Sci-Fi	SNES	Monster raising		JP
1994 (NA)	Shadowrun (EN)	BlueSky	Sega	Sci-Fi	GEN	Action RPG	Shadowrun franchise	NA
1994 (JP)	Shin Megami Tensei II (JA)	Atlus	Atlus	Fantasy	SNES	JRPG	Megami Tensei (Shin Megami Tensei)	JP
1994 (JP); 1995 (NA/EU)	Shining Force CD (EN)	Sonic!	Sega	Fantasy	SCD (Remake)	Tactical RPG	Shining Force Gaiden: Remake of 1 and 2	JP
1994 (JP)	Slayer (EN)	Lion	SSI	Fantasy	3DO	Action RPG	Dungeons & Dragons franchise	NA
1994 (JP)	Slayers (EN)			Fantasy	SNES		Based on the Slayers franchise	JP
1994 (JP)	Super Robot Wars EX (EN)	Banpresto	Banpresto	Sci-Fi	SNES	Tactical RPG	Super Robot Wars	JP
1994 (JP)	Surging Aura (EN)			Fantasy	GEN			JP
1994 (JP)	Tenshi no Uta: Shiroki Tsubasa no Inori (JA)	Nintendo	Telenet Japan	Fantasy	SNES	JRPG	Tenshi no Uta	JP
1994 (NA)	Ultima I: The First Age of Darkness	Origin	Vitesse	Fantasy	APPGS (Remake)	WRPG	Ultima: Remake of I for APPII	NA
1994 (??)	Ultima: Runes of Virtue II (EN)	Origin	FCI; Pony Canyon	Fantasy	GB, SNES	Action RPG	Ultima: Runes of Virtue	NA/JP
1994 (??)	Ultima: The Black Gate (EN)	Origin	Origin	Fantasy	SNES	WRPG (real-time)	Ultima: Remake of VII for PC	NA
1994 (NA)	Ultima VIII: Pagan	Origin	Origin	Fantasy	DOS	WRPG (real-time)	Ultima	NA
1994 (NA)	Ultima VIII: Pagan – Speech Pack	Origin	EA	Fantasy	DOS	WRPG (real-time)	Ultima: Add-on for VIII	NA
1994 (NA)	Vay (EN)	SIMS	Working Designs	Fantasy; Sci-Fi	SCD	JRPG		JP
1994 (JP)	Wizap! (EN)			Fantasy	SNES			JP
1994 (NA)	Wizardry Trilogy 2	Sir-Tech	Sir-Tech	Fantasy; Sci-Fi	DOS (Comp)	WRPG	Wizardry: Comp of V through VII	NA
1994 (NA)	Wolf	Manley & Associates	Sanctuary Woods		DOS	WRPG, Life simulation		NA
1994 (JP)	Xak III: The Eternal Recurrence (EN) サーク III (JA)	Microcabin, NEC	Microcabin, NEC	Fantasy	PCD (Port)	Action RPG	Xak: Port of III for PC98	JP
1994 (TW)	Xuan-Yuan Sword 2	DOMO Studio	Softstar Entertainment	Fantasy	DOS	Action RPG	Xuan-Yuan Sword	TW
1995 (JP)	2nd Super Robot Wars G	Banpresto	Banpresto	Sci-Fi	GB (Remake)	Tactical RPG	Super Robot Wars: Remake of 2nd	JP
1995 (JP)	4th Super Robot Wars	Banpresto	Banpresto	Sci-Fi	SNES (Remake)	Tactical RPG	Super Robot Wars: Remake of 3rd	JP
1995 (NA)	AD&D Eye of the Beholder Trilogy	Westwood	SSI	Fantasy	DOS (Comp)	Action RPG (DM style)	Dungeons & Dragons franchise: Eye of the Beholder: Comp of series	NA
1995 (NA)	AD&D Ultimate Fantasy	Various	Slash	Fantasy	DOS (Comp)	Action RPG (DM style); Tactical RPG	Dungeons & Dragons franchise: Comp of Dark Sun: Shattered Lands, Dungeon Hack, Fantasy Empires, Stronghold and FRUA	NA
1995 (DE); 1996 (NA)	Albion	Blue Byte	Blue Byte	Science Fantasy	DOS	WRPG		DE
1995 (JP)	Another Bible	MIT	Atlus	Fantasy	GB		Megami Tensei Gaiden	JP
1995 (NA)	Anvil of Dawn	DreamForge Intertainment	New World Computing	Fantasy	DOS	WRPG		NA
1995 (JP)	Arc the Lad	G-Craft	SCE	Fantasy	PS1	Tactical RPG	Arc the Lad	JP
1995 (JP)	Ball Bullet Gun: Survival Game Simulation			Sci-Fi	SNES	Tactical RPG		JP
1995 (JP); 1996 (NA)	Beyond the Beyond	Camelot	SCE	Fantasy	PS1	JRPG		JP
1995 (JP)	Brandish 2: The Planet Buster	Nihon Falcom	Nihon Falcom	Fantasy	DOS, SNES	Action RPG	Brandish	JP
1995 (JP)	Burning Heroes			Fantasy	SNES			JP
1995 (JP/NA)	Chrono Trigger	Square	Square	Fantasy	SNES	JRPG	Chrono series	JP
1995 (JP)	Crystal Beans: From Dungeon Explorer			Fantasy	SNES		Dungeon Explorer	JP
1995 (GB)	Curse of Dragor	Banshee Software	Domark	Fantasy	MAC	Dungeon crawler		UK
1995 (NA)	Deathkeep	Lion	SSI	Fantasy	3DO	Action RPG	Dungeons & Dragons franchise	NA
1995 (JP)	Demon of Laplace	Vic Tokai	HummingBird	Fantasy	SNES (Port)	JRPG/Survival Horror hybrid		JP
1994 (EU)	Dragon Lore: The Legend Begins	Cryo Interactive	Mindscape	Fantasy	DOS	Adventure	Dragon Lore	FR
1995 (JP)	Dragon Quest VI	Heartbeat	Enix	Fantasy	SNES	JRPG	Dragon Quest	JP
1995 (JP)	Dragon Slayer: The Legend of Heroes II	Sega Falcom	Sega	Fantasy	GEN (Port)	JRPG	Dragon Slayer: The Legend of Heroes	JP
1995 (JP)	Kyuuyaku Megami Tensei	Opera House	Atlus	Fantasy	SNES	JRPG	Megami Tensei: Remake and compilation of 1 and 2 for NES	JP
1995 (JP)	Dragon Tycoon Eiji			Fantasy	3DO			JP
1995 (NA)	Dungeon Master II: The Legend of Skullkeep	FTL	Interplay	Fantasy	AMI (Port), DOS (Port), MAC (Port)	Action RPG (DM-style)	Dungeon Master	NA
1995 (JP)	DunQuest			Fantasy	SNES			JP
1995 (JP)	Elfaria II エルファリアII	The Red Company	Hudson Soft	Fantasy	SNES		Elfaria	JP
1995 (JP)	Emerald Dragon	Alfa System	Media Works	Fantasy	SNES (Port)	JRPG	Emerald Dragon	JP
1995 (NA); 1996 (EU)	Entomorph	Cyberlore; SSI	Mindscape; SSI	Steampunk	MAC, WIN, WIN3X	WRPG	World of Aden: Thunderscape	JP
1995 (JP)	Eternal Filena; Eien no Filena 永遠のフィレーナ	Tokuma Shoten	Tokuma Shoten	Fantasy	SNES	JRPG	Based on the Eternal Filena novels	JP
1995 (NA)	Exile: Escape from the Pit	Spiderweb	Spiderweb	Fantasy	MAC, WIN, WIN3X	Tactical RPG	Exile	NA
1995 (JP)	Farland Story	TGL	Banpresto	Fantasy	SNES (Port)	Tactical RPG	Farland Story	JP
1995 (JP)	Farland Story 2 Farland Story Denki: Arc Ou no Ensei	TGL	Banpresto	Fantasy	SNES (Port)	Tactical RPG	Farland Story	JP
1995 (JP)	Farland Story: Daichi no Kizuna; Farland Story 5	TGL	TGL	Fantasy	DOS	Tactical RPG	Farland Story	JP
1995 (TW)	Flame Dragon 2: Legend of Golden Castle		Dynasty	Fantasy	DOS	Tactical RPG	Flame Dragon	TW
1995 (JP)	Front Mission	Square	Square	Sci-Fi	SNES	Tactical RPG	Front Mission	JP
1995 (JP)	Gran Historia			Fantasy	SNES			JP
1995 (JP)	Gulliver Boy	Hudson Soft	Hudson Soft	Fantasy	PCE	JRPG	Based on the anime Gulliver Boy	JP
1995 (JP)	Heian Fuuunden 平安風雲伝	KSS	KSS	Fantasy	SNES	Tactical RPG		JP
1995 (NA)	Jagged Alliance: Deadly Games	Sir-Tech	Sir-Tech	Modern	DOS	Tactical RPG	Jagged Alliance	NA
1995 (JP); 1996 (NA)	King's Field II; King's Field in NA	From	Agetec	Fantasy	PS1		King's Field	JP
1995 (JP)	Kou Ryuu Ki	Koei		Fantasy	SNES	Tactical RPG		JP
1995 (JP)	Lady Stalker: Challenge from the Past	Climax Entertainment	Taito	Fantasy	SNES	Action RPG	Spin-off of Landstalker	JP
1995 (JP)	Langrisser, Der; Langrisser II デア ラングリッサー	Masaya	NCS	Fantasy	SNES (Remake)	Tactical RPG	Langrisser: Remake of II for GEN	JP
1995 (JP)	Last Bible III	MIT	Atlus	Fantasy	SNES		Megami Tensei Gaiden	JP
1995 (TW); 1996 (CN); 1999 (JP)	Legend of Sword and Fairy, The	Softstar	Softstar	Fantasy	WIN, DOS, SAT, IOS	Turn-based	The Legend of Sword and Fairy	TW
1995 (JP)	Legend of Xanadu II	Nihon Falcom	Nihon Falcom	Fantasy	PCD	Action RPG	Legend of Xanadu	JP
1995 (JP)	Light Fantasy 2			Fantasy	SNES		Light Fantasy	JP
1995 (JP)	Little Master 3 リトルマスター〜虹色の魔石〜		Tokuma Shoten	Fantasy	SNES	Tactical RPG	Little Master	JP
1995 (JP); 1996 (NA)	Lufia II: Rise of the Sinistrals; Estpolis Denki II エストポリス伝記II	Neverland	Taito; Natsume Inc. Nintendo	Fantasy	SNES	JRPG	Lufia	JP
1995 (JP)	Lunar: Walking School	Game Arts	Game Arts	Fantasy	GG	JRPG	Lunar	JP
1995 (EU)	Magic Island: The Secret of Stones	Arda	Signum	Fantasy	AMI, AMI32			
1995 (JP); 1998 (NA)	Magic Knight Rayearth	Sega	Working Designs	Fantasy	SAT	Action RPG	Based on the anime series of the same name	JP
1995 (JP)	Magic Knight Rayearth	Pandora Box	Tomy	Fantasy	SNES	Action RPG	Based on the anime series of the same name	JP
1995 (JP)	Majin Tensei II: Spiral Nemesis 魔神転生II SPIRAL NEMESIS	Atlus	Atlus	Fantasy	SNES	Tactical RPG	Megami Tensei; Majin Tensei	JP
1995 (JP)	Metal Max Returns	Crea-Tech	Data East	Fantasy	SNES (Remake)		Metal Max	JP
1995 (NA)	Might and Magic: World of Xeen	New World	New World	Fantasy	MAC (Port)	WRPG	Might and Magic: Comp of IV and V	NA
1995 (JP)	Mystaria: The Realms of Lore; Blazing Heroes and Riglord Saga	Sega	Sega	Fantasy	SAT	Tactical RPG	Riglord Saga	JP
1995 (JP)	Mystic Ark			Fantasy	SNES		Mystic Ark	JP
1995 (JP)	Oni V: Innin o Tsugumono; ONI V -隠忍を継ぐ者-	Pandora Box	Banpresto	Fantasy	GB		ONI series	JP
1995 (JP)	Pretty Soldier Sailor Moon: Another Story	Angel	Angel	Fantasy	SNES		Based on the anime Sailor Moon	JP
1995 (JP)	Princess Minerva			Fantasy	SNES			JP
1995 (JP)	Pumpkin Adventure III: The Hunt for the Unknown	Umax	Sunrise		MSX2		Pumpkin Adventure	JP
1995 (NA)	Quest for Glory IV: Shadows of Darkness	Sierra	Sierra	Fantasy	DOS (Rerel)	Adventure/RPG hybrid	Quest for Glory	NA
1995 (NA/UK)	Ravenloft: Stone Prophet	DreamForge; SSI	Mindscape	Fantasy	DOS	WRPG	Dungeons & Dragons franchise: Ravenloft campaign setting	NA
1995 (JP)	Record of Lodoss War			Fantasy	SNES (Port)		Based on the Record of Lodoss War franchise	JP
1995 (JP)	Rejoice			Fantasy	SNES			JP
1995 (JP)	Romancing SaGa 3	Square	Square	Fantasy	SNES	JRPG	SaGa	JP
1995 (JP)	Royal Stone			Fantasy	GG			JP
1995 (JP)	RPG Maker	Success	ASCII	Fantasy	SNES	RPG-creation software	RPG Maker	JP
1995 (JP)	Ruin Arm	Plex	Bandai	Fantasy	SNES			JP
1995 (NA); 1996 (PAL)	Secret of Evermore	Square Soft	Square	Fantasy	SNES	Action RPG		NA
1995 (JP)	Seiken Densetsu 3	Square	Square	Fantasy	SNES	Action RPG	Mana	JP
1995 (JP)	Sengoku Cyber: Fujimaru Jigokuhen 戦国サイバー 藤丸地獄変	Sony	Sony	Historical	PS1	Tactical RPG		JP
1995 (JP)	Shin Megami Tensei: Devil Summoner	Atlus	Atlus	Fantasy	SAT	JRPG	Megami Tensei: Devil Summoner	JP
1995 (JP)	Shining Force Gaiden: Final Conflict	Sonic!	Sega	Fantasy	GG	Tactical RPG	Shining Force	JP
1995 (JP)	Shinseiki Odysselya 2			Fantasy	SNES		Shinseiki Odysselya	JP
1995 (NA)	Stonekeep	Interplay Entertainment	Interplay Entertainment	Fantasy	WIN, DOS	Dungeon crawl		NA
1995 (JP); 1996 (NA); 1997 (EU)	Suikoden	Konami	Konami	Fantasy	PS1	Strategy/RPG hybrid	Suikoden (Based loosely on the novel of the same name)	JP
1995 (JP)	Super Chinese Land 3	Culture Brain	Culture Brain	Historical	GB	Action RPG	Super Chinese	JP
1995 (JP)	Super Chinese World 3			Fantasy	SNES	Action RPG	Super Chinese	JP
1995 (NA)	Swords of Xeen	New World	New World	Fantasy	DOS	WRPG	Might and Magic: Expansion to World of Xeen	NA
1995 (JP)	Sylvan Tale	Sega	Sega	Fantasy	GG	Action RPG		JP
1995 (JP)	Tactics Ogre: Let Us Cling Together	Quest	Atlus	Fantasy	SNES	Tactical RPG	Ogre Battle	JP
1995 (JP)	Tales of Phantasia	Wolf Team; Namco Tales	Namco	Fantasy	SNES	Action RPG	Tales	JP
1995 (JP)	Tenchi Muyo! Game-hen	Tam-Tam	Banpresto	Fantasy	SNES	Tactical RPG	Based on the anime Tenchi Muyo!	JP
1995 (JP)	Tengai Makyō Zero	Red Ent.	Hudson Soft	Fantasy	SNES	JRPG	Tengai Makyō	JP
1995 (JP); 1996 (EU)	Terranigma	Quintet	Enix; Nintendo	Fantasy	SNES	Action RPG	Sequel to Illusion of Gaia for SNES	JP
1995 (JP)	Verne World	Banpresto		Comedy	SNES	JRPG		JP
1995 (JP/NA/EU)	Virtual Hydlide	T&E	Atlus	Fantasy	SAT	Action RPG	Hydlide	JP
1995 (JP)	Wizardry VI: Bane of the Cosmic Forge	Game Studio	ASCII	Fantasy	SNES (Port)	WRPG	Wizardry	NA
1995 (JP)	Wizardry VII: Crusaders of the Dark Savant	Solition	SCEI	Fantasy	PS1 (Port)	WRPG	Wizardry	NA
1995 (NA)	World of Aden: Thunderscape	SSI	Mindscape; SSI	Steampunk	DOS	WRPG	World of Aden: Thunderscape	NA
1995 (JP)	Wozz	Red Company	Bullet-Proof Software	Fantasy	SNES			JP
1995 (TW)	Xuan-Yuan Sword: Dance of the Maple Banners	DOMO Studio	Softstar Entertainment	Fantasy	DOS	Action RPG	Xuan-Yuan Sword	TW
1995 (JP)	Yamato Takeru			Fantasy	SNES			JP
1995 (??)	Ys V: Lost Kefin, Kingdom of Sand	Nihon Falcom	Nihon Falcom	Fantasy	SNES	Action RPG	Ys	JP
