= Index of DOS games (D) =

This is an index of notable DOS games.

This list has been split into multiple pages. Please use the Table of Contents to browse it.

Title	Released	Developer(s)	Publisher(s)
D	1995	WARP	Acclaim Entertainment
Dagger of Amon Ra, The	1992	Sierra On-Line	Sierra On-Line
Dalek Attack	1992	Alternative Software	Alternative Software
Dam Busters	1986	Sydney Development Corp.	U.S. Gold
Dame Was Loaded, The	1995	Beam Software	Philips Interactive Media
Dangerous Dave	1990	John Romero	Softdisk
Dangerous Dave in Copyright Infringement	1990	John Romero	
Dangerous Dave in the Haunted Mansion	1991	Gamer's Edge, id Software	Softdisk
Dangerous Dave's Risky Rescue	1993	Gamer's Edge	Softdisk
Dark Ages	1991	Scenario Software	Apogee Software
Dark Castle	1987	Silicon Beach Software	Mirrorsoft
Darker	1995	Psygnosis	Psygnosis
Dark Heart of Uukrul, The	1990	Digital Studios Limited	Broderbund
Darklands	1992	MicroProse	MicroProse
Dark Legions	1994	Silicon Knights	Strategic Simulations
Darklight Conflict	1997	Rage Software	Electronic Arts
Dark Queen of Krynn	1992	Strategic Simulations	Strategic Simulations
Dark Seed	1992	Cyberdreams	Cyberdreams
Dark Seed 2	1995	Destiny Media Technologies	Cyberdreams
Darkspyre	1990	Event Horizon Software	Event Horizon Software
Dark Sun: Shattered Lands	1993	Strategic Simulations	Strategic Simulations
Dark Sun: Wake of the Ravager	1994	Strategic Simulations	Strategic Simulations, Mindscape
Daryl F. Gates' Police Quest: SWAT	1995	Sierra On-Line	Sierra On-Line
Das Stundenglas	1990	Weltenschmiede	Software 2000
Daughter of Serpents	1992	Eldritch Games	Millennium Interactive
Dave Goes Nutz	1993	Gamer's Edge	Softdisk
David Leadbetter's Greens	1992	Thought Train	MicroProse
David Wolf: Secret Agent	1989	Dynamix	Dynamix
Dawn Patrol	1994	Rowan Software	Empire Interactive
Dawn Patrol: Head to Head	1995	Rowan Software	Empire Interactive
Day of the Tentacle	1993	LucasArts	LucasArts
Day of the Viper	1989	Accolade	Accolade
Days of Thunder	1990	Argonaut Software	Mindscape
D-Day: America Invades	1995	Atomic Games	Avalon Hill
Deadline	1982	Infocom	Infocom
Deathbringer	1992	Empire Interactive	Empire Interactive
Death Bringer	1989	Pandora Software	Pandora Software
Death Gate	1994	Legend Entertainment	Legend Entertainment
Death Knights of Krynn	1991	Strategic Simulations	Strategic Simulations
Death Rally	1996	Remedy Entertainment	Apogee Software
Deathtrack	1989	Dynamix	Activision
Decision in the Desert	1985	MicroProse	MicroProse
Deep Space: Operation Copernicus	1986	Sir-Tech	Sir-Tech
Deer Napped	1995	Nic-Ty Entertainment	Nic-Ty Entertainment
Defcon 5	1995	Millennium Interactive	Nova Spring
Defender	1983	Atari	Atarisoft
Defender of the Crown	1987	Master Designer Software	Mirrorsoft
Deja Vu: A Nightmare Comes True	1987	ICOM Simulations	Mindscape
Deja Vu II: Lost in Las Vegas	1990	ICOM Simulations	Mindscape
Delta V	1994	Bethesda Softworks	Bethesda Softworks
Demon Attack	1982	Imagic	Imagic
Demon Stalkers	1988	Micro Forté Pty	Electronic Arts
Demon's Forge	1987	Saber Software	Saber Software
Demon's Winter	1988	Strategic Simulations	Strategic Simulations
Depth Dwellers	1994	TriSoft	TriSoft
Der Schatz im Silbersee	1993	CyberVision	Software 2000
Descent	1994	Parallax Software	Interplay Entertainment
Descent II	1996	Parallax Software	Interplay Entertainment
Descent to Undermountain	1998	Interplay Entertainment	Interplay Entertainment
Desert Strike: Return to the Gulf	1992	Electronic Arts	Electronic Arts
Designasaurus	1988	DesignWare	Britannica Software
Designasaurus II	1990	Visual Concepts	Britannica Software
Despair 2	1995	U-Neek Software	U-Neek Software
Despair 3	1995	U-Neek Software	U-Neek Software
Destroyer	1986	Epyx	Epyx
Destruction Derby	1995	Reflections Interactive	Psygnosis
Destruction Derby 2	1996	Reflections Interactive	Psygnosis
Detroit	1994	Impressions Games	Impressions Games
Deus	1996	Silmarils	ReadySoft
D/Generation	1991	Veda Hlubinka-Cook, James Brown	Mindscape
Die Hard	1990	Pack-In-Video	Activision
Die Kathedrale	1991	Weltenschmiede	Software 2000
Dig Dug	1982	Atari	Atarisoft
Digger	1983	Windmill Software	Windmill Software
Diggers	1993	Millennium Interactive	Nova Spring
Diggers 2: Extractors	1995	Millennium Interactive	
Dig, The	1995	LucasArts	LucasArts
DinoPark Tycoon	1993	MECC, Manley & Associates	MECC
Dinotopia	1995	Dreamers Guild	Turner Interactive
Dino Wars	1990	Off The Wall Productions	DigiTek Software
Disciples of Steel	1994	MegaSoft Entertainment	FormGen
Discoveries of the Deep	1993	Capstone Software	Capstone Software
Discovery: In the Steps of Columbus	1992	Impressions Games	
Discworld	1995	Teeny Weeny Games, Perfect 10 Productions	Psygnosis, Dro Soft
Discworld II	1996	Perfect Entertainment	Psygnosis
Disney's Aladdin	1992	Virgin Interactive, Disney Interactive Studios	Virgin Interactive
Disney's Duck Tales: The Quest for Gold	1990	Incredible Technologies	Walt Disney Computer Software
Dive Bomber	1988	Acme Animation	U.S. Gold
Dizzy: Prince of the Yolkfolk	1993	Codemasters	Codemasters
Dogfight	1993	Microprose	Microprose
Dominus	1994	Visual Concepts	U.S. Gold
Donald's Alphabet Chase	1988	Westwood Associates	Disney Software
Donald Duck's Playground	1986	Sierra On-Line	Sierra On-Line
Donkey	1981	Microsoft Game Studios	IBM, Microsoft Game Studios
Donkey Island	2000	Pterodon Software	Epic Games
Donkey Kong	1982	Softweaver	Atarisoft
Doom	1993	id Software	id Software, Midway Games, GT Interactive
Doom II: Hell on Earth	1994	id Software	GT Interactive
Double Dare	1988	GameTek	GameTek
Double Dragon	1988	Arcadia Systems	Arcadia Systems
Double Dragon II: The Revenge	1989	Virgin Mastertronic	Virgin Games
Double Dragon 3: The Rosetta Stone	1992	Storm Software	Interavision
Double Dribble	1990	Novotrade International	Konami
Downhill Challenge	1988	Microïds	Loriciel
Down in the Dumps	1996	Haiku Studios	Philips Media
Dracula Unleashed	1993	ICOM Simulations	Viacom
Dragon History	1995	NoSense	Vochozka Trading
Dragon Knight 2	1991	Elf Co., Ltd.	Elf Co., Ltd.
Dragon Knight 4	1994	Elf Co., Ltd.	Elf Co., Ltd.
Dragon Lord	1990	Outlaw Software	Spotlight Software
Dragon Lore: The Legend Begins	1994	Cryo Interactive	Mindscape
Dragon's Lair	1993	ReadySoft Incorporated	ReadySoft Incorporated
Dragon's Lair: Escape from Singe's Castle	1991	Sullivan Bluth Interactive Media	ReadySoft Incorporated
Dragon's Lair II: TimeWarp	1990	Sullivan Bluth Interactive Media	ReadySoft Incorporated
Dragon's Lair III: The Curse of Mordread	1992	Sullivan Bluth Interactive Media	ReadySoft Incorporated
Dragon Slayer: The Legend of Heroes	1990	Nihon Falcom	Nihon Falcom
Dragon Slayer: The Legend of Heroes II	1992	Nihon Falcom	Nihon Falcom
Dragons of Flame	1989	U.S. Gold	Strategic Simulations, U.S. Gold
Dragonsphere	1994	MicroProse	MicroProse
DragonStrike	1990	Westwood Studios	Strategic Simulations
Dragon Wars	1989	Interplay Entertainment	Activision
Dragonworld	1984	Byron Preiss Video Productions	Trillium Corp.
Drakkhen	1989	Infogrames	Data East
Dráscula: The Vampire Strikes Back	1996	Alcachofa Soft	Digital Dreams Multimedia
Dr. Doom's Revenge	1989	Paragon Software	Empire Interactive
Dreams to Reality	1997	Cryo Interactive	Cryo Interactive
Dreamweb	1994	Creative Reality	Empire Interactive
Drugwars	1994	American Laser Games	American Laser Games
Druid: Daemons of the Mind	1995	Homebrew Software	Homebrew Software
Duel: Test Drive II	1989	Distinctive Software	Accolade
Duke Nukem	1991	Apogee Software	Apogee Software
Duke Nukem II	1993	Apogee Software	Apogee Software
Duke Nukem 3D	1996	3D Realms	Apogee Software
Dune	1992	Cryo Interactive	Virgin Entertainment
Dune II: The Building of a Dynasty	1992	Westwood Studios	Virgin Interactive
Dungeon Explorer	1990	John K. Murphy	
Dungeon Hack	1993	DreamForge Intertainment	Strategic Simulations
Dungeon Keeper	1997	Bullfrog Productions	Electronic Arts
Dungeon Keeper: The Deeper Dungeons	1997	Bullfrog Productions	Electronic Arts
Dungeon Master	1992	FTL Games	Psygnosis
Dungeon Master II: The Legend of Skullkeep	1995	FTL Games	Interplay Entertainment
Dungeons of Kroz	1989	Scott Miller	Apogee Software
Dunjax	1990	Jeff Mather, David Niec	
Dunjonquest: Curse of Ra	1982	Epyx	Automated Simulations
Dunjonquest: Morloc's Tower	1983	Epyx	Automated Simulations
Dunjonquest: Temple of Apshai	1982	Epyx	Automated Simulations
Dunjonquest: Upper Reaches of Apshai	1982	Epyx	Automated Simulations
Dusk of the Gods	1991	Event Horizon Software	Interstel
