= Veil of Darkness =

1993 video game

- Developer: Event Horizon Software
- Publisher: Strategic Simulations
- Designers: Thomas J. Holmes; Christopher L. Straka
- Programmer: Thomas J. Holmes
- Artists: Frank Schurter; Jane Yeager
- Writer: Scot Noel
- Composers: Anthony Mollick; Ed Puskar; Pete Smolcic
- Platforms: MS-DOS, FM Towns, PC-98
- Release: March 1993
- Genres: Adventure, role-playing

Veil of Darkness is a horror-action-adventure game for MS-DOS, FM Towns and PC-98, which was developed by Event Horizon Software and published by Strategic Simulations in 1993. Veil of Darkness is a third person, 2D point-and-click adventure game with RPG elements featuring a fixed isometric perspective and a fair share of action-RPG style combat.

== Gameplay ==
Veil of Darkness features an isometric point of view, a control panel customizable in size and an inventory system. All actions are controlled by the mouse and by areas / items within the control panel. A player can use either arrow keys for guiding movement or the mouse. The inventory can hold several items, and the player can also find bags and pouches that enable the player to carry more items. There is an indication in the control panel for weight (the knapsack bulges when inventory is too heavy), and for health (the player character in a coffin becomes a skeleton progressively from the feet upwards). There is a 'mirror' that will indicate if the player has an ailment (aged, cursed, etc.), and also certain ailments show on the Player's face in the Player portrait in the control panel. In conversations, the Player can click on a certain underlined word to pursue that topic, or the Player can type a word when the input cursor appears. If the typed word is appropriate, the Player will receive a response. For instance to end a conversation, the Player could click 'Bye' or type 'Bye'.

The game is non-linear: the player can wander about and explore freely within an area, but certain places or actions cannot progress until the player has done certain actions and/or found certain items. The player moves around in a dark valley, solving puzzles and occasionally killing monsters such as werewolves, vampires and skeletons. Different weapons work with different enemies, so the Player needs to find the right weapon for each battle. Also, one needs to find different plants (and sometimes other items) to cure different ailments. The puzzles are typical of a point-and-click adventure game. The puzzles consist mainly of piecing together what the player learns from conversations, finding and using objects and finding ways to get into locked areas or past a guardian.

== Plot ==
The player assumes the role of a cargo pilot whose plane mysteriously crashes while he is flying over a remote valley in Romania. The player is rescued from the crash by Deirdre, the daughter of Kiril Kristoverikh, the wealthiest man in the valley. While exploring their surroundings, the player quickly discovers that the valley's inhabitants are unable to escape and are plagued by various evils. Kiril explains to the player that their arrival was foretold in a prophecy, and that they are destined to destroy Kairn; the valley's tyrannical ruler, who long ago rejected his humanity to become an immortal vampire and trapped the entire valley in eternal darkness.

The player begins exploring the valley in search of a way to destroy Kairn and escape, meeting its inhabitants, gathering items, and battling evil creatures along the way. As the player progresses, they begin to complete various deeds described as part of the prophecy; this includes healing some of Kairn's victims, slaying a werewolf responsible for killing numerous villagers, and allowing the tormented souls of Kairn's murdered brothers and father to pass on to the afterlife. They also end up slaying Andrei, Kiril's son, who was reanimated as a zombie after Kiril unsuccessfully appealed to Kairn to revive him.

As they prepare to slay Andrei, Kiril informs the player that Kairn kidnapped Deirdre to transform her into one of his vampiric brides, and they resolve to rescue her. Eventually, they discover the Agrippa; an evil sentient tome that first granted Kairn his powers, and was subsequently imprisoned once Kairn deemed it a threat. In response, it placed a curse on Kairn, which became the prophecy foretelling the player's arrival. The player frees the Agrippa using a key found beside Kairn's coffin in his stronghold; while there, they meet the imprisoned Deirdre. Deirdre reveals that her father is truly corrupt, and willingly turned her over to Kairn in exchange for being able to leave the valley.

The Agrippa reveals Kairn's true name to the player (randomly generated from a list of suggestions) so they can weaken him, and vanishes. Once the prophecy is nearly completed, the player heads to Kairn's stronghold, and battles him using a combination of items to weaken his powers. Kairn retreats to his coffin in order to regain his strength, only to discover that it had been previously sealed by the player. The player finally defeats Kairn by driving a wooden stake through his heart and beheading him, ending his evil for good. The valley is freed from Kairn's influence, and the player leaves Romania on a boat with Deirdre, embracing her.

== Intellectual property rights ==
Event Horizon Software was eventually renamed DreamForge Intertainment before being dissolved in 2001. The company developed three other games: The Summoning, Dusk of the Gods and DarkSpyre.

Strategic Simulations, Inc. was bought by Ubisoft in 2004.

== Reception ==
Computer Gaming World wrote that Veil of Darkness "held me in rapt attention until I had seen it through to its resolution". While critical of the brief length of the game, the magazine stated that "the experience is one to be savored ... definitely one that I am glad to have played". The magazine later nominated Veil of Darkness for its Role-Playing Game of the Year award, alongside The Summoning. Power Unlimited gave a score of 70% writing: "Veil of Darkness may not have an original story (it's very similar to Dracula), but there are plenty and many assignments, all of which work together to keep the game fun. Only the intro is a bit too long".

James Trunzo reviewed Veil of Darkness in White Wolf #37 (July/Aug., 1993) and stated that "On the down side, the music seems appropriate, but becomes intrusive afte a while. Some puzzles seem overly difficult early in the game, and what combat there is can take a while to complete. Still, Veil is an excellent change of pace from the typical dungeon crawl. If you enjoy the games of the horror ilk, Veil of Darkness is definitely worth a try."
