= Ravenloft (disambiguation) =

Ravenloft is a campaign setting for the Dungeons & Dragons role-playing game.

Ravenloft may refer to:

- Ravenloft (module), a 1983 adventure module for the Dungeons & Dragons role-playing game

- Ravenloft II: The House on Gryphon Hill, 1986 sequel to the original Ravenloft module

- Ravenloft: Realm of Terror, a boxed set accessory published in 1990 for the Ravenloft campaign setting for the Advanced Dungeons & Dragons fantasy role-playing game
- Ravenloft: Strahd's Possession, a 1994 fantasy role-playing video game developed by DreamForge Intertainment for Strategic Simulations, Inc. for DOS

- Ravenloft: Stone Prophet, a 1995 fantasy role-playing video game and the sequel to Ravenloft: Strahd's Possession

- Ravenloft: The Horrors Within, a 2026 Dungeons & Dragons role-playing game sourcebook
- Ravenloft (Sword and Sorcery Studios), a 2001 supplement in which the campaign setting is detailed

== See also ==
- Castle Ravenloft (disambiguation)
