= Al Escudero =

Computer game designer (born 1966)

- Known for: Video game design

Al Escudero (born c. 1966) is a computer game designer.

== Career ==
Escudero is mostly self-taught in computers and gaming. He ran a bulletin board system, Castle Amber, beginning in 1986. In the early 1990s, Escudero and Kris Hatlelid co-wrote The Majic Realm, a game played primarily through a bulletin board system that they owned, ICE Online, based in Burnaby, Canada.

== Games ==
- Deathlord (1987)
- Dungeon Masters Assistant Volume 2: Characters & Treasures (1991)
- Renegade Legion: Interceptor (1991)
- Spelljammer: Pirates of Realmspace (1992)
- Dark Sun: Shattered Lands (1993)
- Al-Qadim: The Genie's Curse (1994)
- 007: Nightfire (2002)
- 007: Agent Under Fire (2002)
- 007: Everything or Nothing (2004)
- The Incredible Hulk: Ultimate Destruction (2005)
- Dungeon Siege: Throne of Agony (2006)
