= Deathbringer =

Deathbringer or Death Bringer may refer to:

- Deathbringer (1991 video game), by Oxford Digital Enterprises
- Death Bringer or Galdregon's Domain, a 1988 video game by Pandora
- Skulduggery Pleasant: Death Bringer, a 2011 novel in the Skulduggery Pleasant series of fantasy novels by Irish author Derek Landy
- A sword owned by American comic book character Lady Death
- A character in the 1989 video game Golden Axe
- A character in certain DC comics involving the superhero Hawkman
- Name of a fictional Dragon who is featured in the Wings of Fire series

== See also ==
- The Three Deathbringers, an idea from Taoism that relates to the Chinese deity Siming
