= The Summoning (video game) =

1992 video game

- Developer(s): Event Horizon Software
- Publisher(s): Strategic Simulations
- Designer(s): Thomas J. Holmes; Christopher L. Straka
- Programmer(s): Thomas J. Holmes
- Artist(s): Frank Schurter; Jane Yeager
- Writer(s): Scot Noel
- Composer(s): Kurt Brown; Anthony Mollick; Ed Puskar
- Platform(s): MS-DOS, PC-98
- Release: 1992 (DOS); 1994 (PC-98)
- Genre(s): Role-playing
- Mode(s): Single-player

The Summoning is an isometric-view fantasy role-playing video game developed by Event Horizon Software (later known as DreamForge Intertainment) and published by Strategic Simulations in 1992.

== Gameplay ==
The sequel to Event Horizon's first game, DarkSpyre, The Summoning replaced the random-generated dungeons of the previous game with pre-designed levels. The title featured numerous magic items, as well as a spell-casting system utilizing virtual hand gestures. The game also utilized "runes" as a way to magically gain abilities or items.

The game had several features typical of dungeon crawls, such as random treasure, weapon and armor options, treasure chests, and the use of a mannequin to visually aid in inventory management.

The dungeon in The Summoning was broken up into separate levels and sections, with different types of monsters (such as undead) and NPCs being found in each.

The featured weapon in the game is a large two-handed blade called "Warmonger." When first found, it is rusty and not very effective. But by repeatedly using it to kill, the magical blade becomes an immensely powerful weapon. The blade is actually a sentient, evil being with bloodlust.

== Reception ==
Computer Gaming World's Samuel B. Baker in 1993 praised the "creature comforts" of The Summoning's graphics and user interface, and concluded "I was sorry to finish this game". The magazine's Scorpia also liked it, citing the "BIG game with much to do"'s "unique ending", puzzles, and automap. She concluded that "it's worth your time". The magazine nominated it as the Role-Playing Game of the Year in October 1993, alongside Veil of Darkness.

The game was reviewed in 1993 in Dragon #194 by Hartley, Patricia, and Kirk Lesser in "The Role of Computers" column. The reviewers gave the game 5 out of 5 stars.

== Reviews ==
- PC Joker (Nov, 1992)
- Power Play (Dec, 1992)
