= Al-Qadim: The Genie's Curse =

1994 video game

- Cover art by Jeff Easley
- Developer: Cyberlore Studios
- Publisher: Strategic Simulations
- Designer: Herb Perez
- Programmer: Ken Grey
- Artists: Garrett MacArthy; Herb Perez
- Series: Al-Qadim
- Platform: MS-DOS
- Release: 1994
- Genre: Action role-playing game
- Mode: Single-player

Al-Qadim: The Genie's Curse is an action role-playing game for the personal computer set in the Al-Qadim campaign setting of Advanced Dungeons & Dragons. The game was developed by Cyberlore Studios and published in 1994 by Strategic Simulations (SSI). The game combines role-playing game and adventure with a simplified interface; the player character is a young corsair trying to clear his family's name, rescue his betrothed and determine who has been freeing genies from their masters.

== Plot ==
A genie becomes freed from his master's control by mysterious forces which are liberating genies for the Nameless Masters. As the story begins, the player character (the son of sultan Zubin Al-Hazrad of Zaratan) is a young man who has just finished his training as a corsair. The corsair is betrothed to the daughter of a caliph. The caliph and his daughter are involved in a hurricane-induced shipwreck, which sweeps the girl overboard. The corsair and his family are blamed for the shipwreck; he must find his bride-to-be and restore his family's honor. The character can interact with his family (including his parents and sister), working to save them from execution; they must also explore the mystery of who has been unleashing genies on the land, and investigate the Genie's Curse.

== Gameplay ==
Unlike the games in SSI's Gold Box series, character generation is greatly simplified. The player chooses a name, by which they are known throughout the game. There is no race, class or skill selection, and play begins immediately. The single player character begins as a 2nd-level corsair, whose statistics are predetermined; the player also cannot change his weapons or armor, although he can eventually improve his starting sword. The character earns experience points by answering puzzles and completing quests, some of which do not involve combat. The character gains levels after accumulating sufficient experience points; gaining levels improves his hit point total, and grants the ability to master new skills for combat.

The game features a simple interface, with icon menus instead of text. Character movement and most object manipulation are controlled by mouse, although the player may use a keyboard or joystick. The player chooses all actions (except movement and projectile weapons) by pressing a single action key (or mouse button), which causes the character to automatically take the correct action with an object; the character either automatically picks up significant objects or can choose to take an object that the character looks at. To talk to characters, or attack monsters with the scimitar, the player moves the character towards the target and clicks. The player selects the difficulty level of the game, which determines the how powerful the monsters are. At the beginning of the game, the player learns how to maneuver the character by moving quickly through a trap-filled dungeon hallway. Al-Qadim features simple, real-time combat, with the character using either one or two weapons simultaneously. The character can use special objects to increase the power of the scimitar, and his ranged weapon is a sling or magic shards which cast various spells. If the character is injured, he can regain hit points with healing potions or be magically healed at special locations.

The game places less emphasis on typical role-playing game elements (such as exploration, combat and magic), favoring adventure-game elements (such as problem-solving and object manipulation) and featuring a smaller world to explore. Travel is shown overhead, including using ships and flying carpets. The character is visible in three-quarter view, but the character and monsters are shown in side view when moving. In many areas, travel is one-directional. Conversations are shown on the screen as text, and the player clicks on which sentences (or phrases) to use. The game includes puzzles and mazes which are important to advancing the plot.

== Development ==
Developer Cyberlore hired a team to create The Genie's Curse shortly after the company was founded in 1992, and it took the company fourteen months to develop the game. It was designed by Herb Perez and produced by Lester Humphreys; the lead programmer was Ken Grey, the art was by Garrett McCarty and Herb Perez and the SSI producer was Bret Berry.

== Publication history ==
Al-Qadim: The Genie's Curse (1994) was one of several games published by SSI from 1992 to 1994 in TSR's settings on a number of game engines, and was later included in the 1996 AD&D Masterpiece Collection compilation set.

For the MMORPG Dark Sun Online: Crimson Sands the developer used images from Al-Qadim to finish the title on time despite a low development budget.

The game was re-released in 2015 on GOG.com with support for Windows, macOS, and Linux.

== Reception ==
Reception

Review scores
Publication	Score
Computer Gaming World	3.5/5
Dragon	4/5
PC Gamer (UK)	73%
PC Zone	40 out of 100

Substituting for Scorpia, Petra Schlunk reviewed the game for Computer Gaming World. Stating that "SSI has taken a decisive step away from" products like Ravenloft and Dark Sun, she reported that it was "not a standard role-playing game and it is not a standard adventure game. Al-Qadim is a story in which we get to play the main character". While decrying limited player options, Schlunk added that "the story is charming, graphically pleasing [...] of reasonable length [...] and worth 'playing'. In this game, elements of both role-playing and adventure games are blended cleverly with one of the most facile interfaces to date". Schlunk concluded: "Borrowing heavily from the Arabian Nights, Al-Qadim has captured the charm and wonder of those tales".

Computer Shopper praised the game, saying that it "managed to capture the feel of the Al-Qadim setting". The magazine noted the graphics and audio, calling both "typical high-quality SSI offerings"; the game's use of honor ("portrayed in a way that isn't trite") was also cited.

PC Gamer UK's Andy Butcher wrote that "Al-Qadim tries hard to be accessible, inoffensive and appeal to the masses, but ... it's unlikely to whet the appetites of either hardened role-players (it's far too superficial) or newcomers (it's got little of a really good RPG's appeal)". In PC Zone, David McCandless summarized the game as "not very good", with "poor" graphics and "awful" combat.

The Genie's Curse was reviewed in Dragon #208 (1994) by Sandy Petersen in the "Eye of the Monitor" column. Petersen gave the game four (out of five) stars: he called the game a "heaps of fun" with interesting and exotic environment.

James V. Trunzo reviewed Al-Qadim: The Genie's Curse in White Wolf #47 (Sept., 1994), rating it a 4 out of 5 and stated that "I like this game. It has one of the more entertaining plots of its type. It also integrates music, dialogue and graphics to stay true to the genre. Unfortunately, you can run into problems early on that might stymie you."

Allen Rausch wrote for GameSpy that Al-Qadim: The Genie's Curse was "basically SSI's answer to Nintendo's Zelda games", but "it wasn't a very good answer ...as so often happens when a game tries to appeal to two very different audiences at the same time, neither element was entirely successful". He concluded that the game "had its moments, but it wasn't a game that ever approached the realm of 'classic'". In a similar review for GameSpot, Andrew Park and Elliott Chin felt that the game may not appeal to serious RPG fans.

Michael Hengst, editor of Power Play, called the combination of the 1001 Nights-style Al-Qadim setting with the action-packed gameplay of Zelda successful. Hengst and main tester Volker Weitz described its difficulty as low, and gave it an overall rating of 74 percent.

The game sold in excess of 90,000 copies.
