= War Wind =

1996 science fantasy real-time strategy computer game

- Developer: DreamForge Intertainment
- Publisher: Strategic Simulations, Inc.
- Producer: Rick White
- Designer: C. Aaron Kreader
- Programmer: Don Wuenschell
- Artists: Jane Yeager (Note: Jane Yeager is noted in the Special Thanks section of both the in-game credits and user manual of War Wind as having been the art director (and associate producer) at the beginning of its project development.); Eric Ranier Rice; Craig Mrusek
- Writer: Rip Jaffurs
- Composer: James C. McMenamy
- Platform: Microsoft Windows
- Release: October 23, 1996
- Genre: Real-time strategy
- Modes: Single player, netplay

War Wind is a science fantasy real-time strategy game developed by DreamForge Intertainment and published by Strategic Simulations, Inc. (SSI). It was released in 1996 for Microsoft Windows and used DirectX 2.0. The game features four unique playable alien races on the fictional planet of Yavaun, each with their own histories, ideologies, and story campaigns consisting of seven scenarios each and an ending unique to that race. The story explores themes of authoritarianism, slavery, revolution, and mysticism. The game also features a map and scenario editor, as well as netplay with up to seven additional players.

A sequel, War Wind II: Human Onslaught, was released by DreamForge and SSI in 1997. Both games were digitally rereleased on GOG.com in 2016. War Wind went permanently free on GOG.com on June 3, 2020. War Wind was released as a free game on Steam on September 16, 2021.

== Story ==
War Wind takes place on the world of Yavaun, where four races have ambivalently coexisted for millennia. The Tha' Roon—purple Nāga-like oppressors, overlords, and despots of the planet—have dominated the other races of Yavaun and erected a ruling domain known as the Empire; in particular, the Tha' Roon have enslaved the gentle and flora-like Eaggra, forcing the Eaggra to act as their builders and engineers under coercion by the Tha' Roon's acting military force, the elephantine Obblinox. The Tha' Roon accomplished their subjugation of the Obblinox through force of technological supremacy (a knowledge in which they partially shared with the Obblinox in the form of cybernetic replacements for amputations) and the exploitation of the Obblinox's strong intrinsic belief system of loyalty and a strict societal hierarchy. Lastly are the race of the reclusive and traditionalist Shama' Li, monk-like practitioners of spiritual and ancient magic, who desire to unify the four races into a single deific species that physically represents a combination of them all—NagaRom.

=== Plot ===
Yavaun has been under the oppressive control of the Empire—a merciless regime founded and led by the Tha' Roon—for a millennium, known by all as the Thousand Years. The Tha' Roon were once feared for their cruel and ruthless combat prowess, which they used to establish the very creation of the Empire; however, over the centuries, they have relied almost exclusively on the Obblinox as their force of arms. The Eaggra, their enslavement by will of the Tha' Roon and enforced by the muscle of the Obblinox, were obliged to construct and forge the original foundation of the Empire from the ground up, and have since been forced to maintain and expand it further throughout Yavaun. This reliance on the Obblinox for military power and the Eaggra for virtually all labor has progressively deteriorated the Tha' Roon's once unequaled self-sufficiency.

This oppression and slavery faced by the Eaggra over the age of the Thousand Years ignited the idea of revolution inside their hearts, and with the encouragement and inspiration from two Eaggra known as Colonel Khorn and Tywald Chainbreaker, they finally struck the first, powerful blow against the Obblinox. This started what was known as the First War of Yavaun. An Eaggra labor camp, of which its slaves formed a clan known as Faction E19, turned their picks against its stationed overseers and constructed their own base in the wake of its overtaking. From there, Faction E19 expanded and branched out to liberate other labor camps and spread word of their cause throughout Yavaun. The initial successes of their insurgency further inspired and reignited hope in other Eaggra.

Once word of the violent uprising of Eaggra slaves reached the Tha' Roon, the Tha' Roon immediately ordered a violent suppression of all rebellion, sending an onslaught of Obblinox forces to slay every last revolting Eaggra. The Obblinox, priding themselves as an honorable and noble race, found an utter absence of honor in the merciless culling of Eaggra innocents, of whom put up little challenge. With this feeling of dishonor came the Obblinox's first doubts after a millennium of the legitimacy of Tha' Roon rule and the Empire. With the continuation of rebel suppression, some Obblinox began to separate themselves from the Empire and align themselves with the Eaggra cause.

Tha' Roon viewed any and all mutiny, regardless of reason, as inexcusable and punishable only by death—even renegades who wished to realign with the Empire. This led to Tha' Roon commanding Obblinox to kill rebel Eaggra and Obblinox alike, which only further radicalized Obblinox to rebellion. Tha' Roon believed the ideation of revolution to have been planted by the Shama' Li, and so they sought to eliminate the Shama' Li entirely.

== Gameplay ==
The basic gameplay is very similar to other real-time strategy games, such as the Warcraft series. Each game begins with a clan leader, and typically some workers and a token defense force. The player must use either their workers to build structures and mine for resources, destroy opposing factions, or escort key units to a different location. Some unique features differentiate the game from others in the genre; for example, in order to get any combat unit other than mercenaries (who are quick mounted units hired from an inn), a worker must be trained at a particular type of building. In order to receive a higher-level combat unit, a lower-level unit must be promoted at a specific facility. Additionally, individual units can be physically augmented with cybernetic or natural enhancements to speed, strength, resilience, stealth, and vision. The purpose for these bionic upgrades is to encourage more strategic conflicts, wherein a player must use a small number of powerful units, instead of building a larger, more simplistic force and rushing the opponent.

=== Stealth ===
A unique aspect of War Wind is its stealth mechanics. Many units possess the ability to conceal themselves from the opponent in different ways, both inherently and through stealth bio-upgrades. "Masked" units do not appear on an opponent's minimap. "Disguised" units appear as friendly units to an opponent but appear as normal on their minimap. "Hidden" units do not appear on the minimap at all and look translucent on the main map. "Invisible" units appear on neither an opponent's minimap nor their main map. Stealth is progressive in nature, meaning that upgrading a masked unit's stealth would make it a disguised unit and upgrading a hidden unit's stealth would make it an invisible unit. Scouts can easily achieve the highest forms of stealth for a race, with scouts being inherently disguised and able to become hidden, and advanced scouts being inherently hidden and able to become invisible.

A unit's stealth is always broken when it attacks or is attacked but will be restored when out of combat for a period of time. Additionally, clan leaders and non-leader units with vision bio-upgrades can see through stealth. Certain spells can also temporarily grant stealth to your units or remove stealth from your opponents' units.

=== Fog of war ===
As with most real-time strategy games, War Wind features a fog of war mechanic. The player can only see within a certain range of their units. Fog of war will conceal any unit completely and mask any structures built, unless that structure has been previously discovered by your units, in which case it will remain visible but darkened by the fog of war. The fog of war does not conceal natural land formations, even those that have not been seen yet. Trees also prevent units from seeing into or through them; however, once a unit enters a tree, it can see just as far as it would normally be able to. Certain spells can also reveal portions of the map as if the player had actually discovered them by foot.

=== Spells ===
Each race has exclusive spells that its mage units can research, learn, and cast with a slowly regenerative pool of mana. Worker units can train to be mages, and mages can train to become advanced mages. Both mage types have the ability to research and learn new spells, although only advanced mages have access to researching and learning higher-level spells. Tha' Roon spells manifest as a form of psionic mental magic that is used to both mentally cripple their opponents and even control them entirely and indefinitely. Obblinox spells, considered to be one of the rarest and most elusive manifestations of magical power, revolve around the destruction of organic life and artificial structures. Eaggra spells embody the forces of nature and restoration, and are used to influence both the earth of Yavaun and its fauna to Eaggra will. Lastly, Shama' Li spells center around the concepts of omniscience, rejuvenation, and evocation, allowing them to dispel illusions, heal injuries of themselves and others, and conjure indigenous wildlife.

== Game modes ==
War Wind is strongly focused on single-player gameplay, although netplay was also supported. The player can choose one of four campaigns (one for each race). Each campaign has seven scenarios and advances the story in a different way through cinematic cutscenes and in-game expositional dialog. Each race has a notably different goal.

Each race also has different units and structures, race-exclusive spells, and strength–weakness tradeoffs. While this became standard for the genre after StarCraft in 1998, in 1996, this was something of an innovation. Earlier games, such as Dune II, featured different sides with different attributes, but not to the extent found in War Wind.

Another innovation for the time was the ability to carry over certain units from mission to mission through a feature called the Hall of Heroes. This ability allows players to bring some of their strongest, most upgraded, and most important units to future scenarios, excluding heroes. This challenges the real-time strategy convention that units can be easily replaced if lost, since upgrading units can be both time-, influence-, and resource-intensive.

== Building and training hierarchies ==
To be successful in the various scenarios of War Wind, a player must both construct, maintain, and defend a variety of structures, and hire, train, and promote units for both combat and advanced construction. Access to more advanced units and structures requires research, resources, influence, and race-specific dependencies.

=== Units ===
Each race has several rankings of units. Each of these rankings have unique titles based on the unit's race. Additionally, each race has several hero units that can appear in the wild during scenario-specific missions or randomly at an inn after meeting specific conditions. Hero units are special in that they can possess stronger stats than other units and even affect gameplay in a unique way, such as affecting the player's race's influence or allowing unique interactions, such as using player's race's battle cry outside of clan leader.

War Wind unit types
Ranking	Tha' Roon	Obblinox	Eaggra	Shama' Li
Clan Leader	Minister	War General	Prime Maker	Shadow Dancer
Worker	Servant	Worker	Scrub	Initiate
Advanced Worker	Architect	Engineer	Artisan	Designer
Mercenary	Rover	Biker	Weed	Cavalier
Warrior	Executioner	Veteran	Squire	Defender
Advanced Warrior	Destroyer	Captain	Knight	Templar
Scout	Rogue	Agent	Scout	Disciple
Advanced Scout	Assassin	Spy	Ranger	Grand Master
Mage	Psychic	Sorcerer	Druid	Shaman
Advanced Mage	Psionic	Warlock	Arch Druid	Guru
War Machine	Jump Troop	Colossus	Grenadier	Elemental

Clan leaders are the head of group, upon which the players lose the game immediately if they die; workers are used to gather resources and build structures, vehicles, and other machinery; mercenaries are mounted infantry units who can generally traverse Yavaun very quickly; warriors are battle-hardened units that generally deal more damage than any other unit; scouts have the main benefit of stealth and powerful long-ranged combat; mages, though generally weak, have the ability to cast powerful and game-altering spells; and war machines are incredibly resilient and mighty units that have been biomechanically augmented to the point of militant excellency.

=== Structures ===
In addition to unique units, each race also has several types of structures they are able to build for resources. Like the unit rankings, these structures have generic names that are applicable to all structures, but each structure has a unique name based on that unit's race. Units can also build other minor structures and machinery, such as walls, roads, land mines, and attack drones.

War Wind structure types
Structure	Tha' Roon	Obblinox	Eaggra	Shama' Li
Courthouse	Citadel	Stronghold	Plantation	Sanctuary
Inn	Grande Parlour	Mead Hall	Watering Hole	Hostel
Home	Manor	Dormitory	Greenhouse	Shelter
Technical Facility	Laboratory	Garage	Plant	Guild House
War College	Academy	Military Base	Garrison	Outpost
Arcanery	University	Cathedral	Conservatory	Temple

Courthouses are used to store resources gathered by workers; inns are large buildings that house randomly appearing workers, mercenaries, and heroes who can typically be hired in exchange for resources; homes are used to increase the amount of maximum units you are able to have; technical facilities are generally used to research bio-upgrades, vehicles, advanced structures, and complex machinery; war colleges are generally used to train warriors and scouts; and arcaneries are generally used to train mages and research spells.

== Monsters ==
War Wind has unique monsters (sometimes referred to as "critters") that have no affiliation with any of the four selectable races. Generally, monsters will only attack when they are attacked first or are "touched" by an adjacent unit controlled by the computer or player.

- Bonca: Perhaps the most common monster in the game, bonca are rhino-like, bright-peach colored, plump, six-legged monsters with a stubby horn. They only attack when hurt or when nearby fledglings are attacked. Shama' Li mercenaries have tamed bonca and use them as infantry mounts.
- Bonca Fledgling: Bonca Fledglings are mischievous creatures that may deliberately attack structures. They have low hit points, but if they are hit, they start squealing and attract adult bonca in the vicinity to protect them. Upon their call, nearby bonca will charge at the offending armies. Once fledglings stop crying, bonca will lose interest and run off.
- The Countenance: More of a natural disaster than an actual living creature, the Countenance is an enormous mummy-like face that randomly forms and rises from the planet, causing obstruction, or worse, destruction to anything that happened to be standing on or near it during formation. Effectively indestructible, although purportedly, there are ways of getting rid of it.
- Dinge Vermin: These creatures are inherently hidden and resemble large rats. Vermin occasionally come to a race's main structure in packs to steal resources and flee with the loot.
- Foul Fess: A tentacled, shapeless monstrosity created by pollution. Highly dangerous, as they are able to siphon the lifeforce of units that they kill. They only appear in highly industrialized areas.
- Ionic Brakus: A small bipedal creature that is able to disable mechanical vehicles and buildings with its ion pulse. More of a hindrance than anything, they have a very durable carapace and are therefore tough to kill.
- Mondra'Harth: A colossal dragon-like creature with six limbs, and many horns and tusks crowning its head. They only make their lairs around sites of great spiritual importance, such as those revered by the Shama' Li. This creature is completely immune to magical spells.
- Rubble Fiend: Disguised as a yellow rock, the Fiend stays stationary until a unit adjacently passes it. In a few seconds it will transform into a hulk of limping, animated rubble. Rubble Fiends are slow but strong and persistent.
- Gas Clouds: Giant clouds that wander seemingly aimlessly across the land, speculated by different races to be either a byproduct of destructive Tha' Roon experimentation and bioengineering, vengeful spirits wanting to enact retribution against those who have wronged them, or extensions of a larger, more powerful, invisible being that is feasting on the earth of Yavaun.
  - Ruin Smoke: An acidic, reddish-brown smog that causes destruction exclusively to structures, like vehicles, buildings, and walls.
  - Retch Cloud: A poisonous, noxious, sickly green gas that deteriorates living and organic tissue that it passes through.
- Slinck Weed: Slinck weeds are slow, dark-green, headless lizard-like monsters. Slinck Weeds use their three tongues and tail to attack and can inflict serious damage, especially to unsuspecting workers gathering resources by themselves, since slinck weeds are easily disguised as normal trees and attack in small groups when simply approached. Some Eaggra units, known as weeds, have tamed these hostile beasts and use them as slow-moving mounts.
- Snipethorn: Snipethorns are small, white anteater-like creatures with long-range firing capabilities. Snipethorns are very commonly in packs and tend to attack completely unprovoked, shooting quills from their long snouts. Alone, snipethorns pose little threat, but when under attack, all snipethorns in the immediate vicinity will come to each other's aid and can prove devastating to an unprepared group.

== Reception ==
Reception

Aggregate score
Aggregator	Score
GameRankings	78%

Review scores
Publication	Score
Computer Games Strategy Plus	3.5/5
Computer Gaming World	4/5
PC Gamer (US)	90%
PC Zone	88/100

The game was a finalist for Computer Gaming World's and CNET Gamecenter's 1996 "Strategy Game of the Year" awards, both of which ultimately went to Civilization II. Gamecenter's editors called it the deepest real-time game at that time.
