= War Wind II: Human Onslaught =

1997 video game

War Wind: Human Onslaught
- Developer: DreamForge Intertainment
- Publisher: Strategic Simulations
- Designer: Aaron Kreader
- Programmer: Vernon H. Harmon II
- Artists: Eric Ranier Rice; Craig Mrusek
- Platform: Microsoft Windows
- Release: November 26, 1997
- Genre: Real-time strategy
- Modes: Single player, multiplayer

War Wind II: Human Onslaught is a real-time strategy computer game from developer DreamForge Intertainment that was published by Strategic Simulations, Inc. in 1997. It is the sequel to DreamForge's 1996 release War Wind.

== Gameplay ==
The game features four campaigns set over 46 scenarios. Players select single or multiple units with point and click controls, and can issue commands to selected units using a command icon bar. Units have different abilities such as swimming, flying, burrowing and stealth, as well as offensive attacks: a frogman is able to demolish explosives, and a legionnaire is able to perform long distance attacks with a laser. War Wind II also features a scenario editor to create and edit custom campaigns.

== Plot ==
The storyline of War Wind II occurs years after the events of the Great Conflict on Yavaun depicted in War Wind.

involves the discovery of one of the tablets of Naga'Rom in the north pole of Earth. A military/scientific station is located at the site of the tablet's recovery. The tablet is inadvertently activated by the scientists at the facility, transporting all occupants of the facility and much of the surrounding ice to Yavaun.

Meanwhile, on Yavaun, the Eaggra have escaped Tha'Roon rule and have allied themselves with the Shama'Li, forming a faction called S.U.N. (Servants Under Naga'Rom). The Tha'Roon have retained their rule over the Obblinox and the Tha'Roon empire's mission is clear: destroy the S.U.N. Faction and rule Yavaun. As the Tha'Roon come close to victory, a sudden burst of light and a new race emerge on Yavaun: Humans. The Tha'Roon turn their attention to the new invaders and the S.U.N. slip away to regroup.

The game begins years into the conflict between all the inhabitants of Yavaun. The humans have splintered into two groups, or factions. The Marines (children of the soldiers of the facility), whose goal is to conquer the other races and rule Yavaun, and the Descendants (children of the scientists) who seek to return to Earth.

The plot for each faction varies dramatically. The Tha'Roon seek to destroy all other races, while the Marines have a similar goal. The Descendants want to simply return to earth. The S.U.N.'s objective is the most peculiar as they want to free the Obblinox, unite with the Descendants, and create peace on Yavaun.

== Reception ==
Reception

Review scores
Publication	Score
Computer Gaming World	3.5/5
GameSpot	8/10
PC Games (US)	B
PC PowerPlay	54%
PC Zone	83%

War Wind II received average reviews upon release.

Critics were divided on the interface. PC PowerPlay found it "clumsy and infuriating" and limiting enjoyment, due to the unorthodox unit selection method and inclusion of inconsistent locations for action menus.
