= Castle Ravenloft (disambiguation) =

Castle Ravenloft is a location in the 1983 Dungeons & Dragons adventure module Ravenloft.

Castle Ravenloft may refer to:

- Expedition to Castle Ravenloft, released in October 2006, the expanded version of the Ravenloft module
- Castle Ravenloft Board Game, a 2010 board game published by Wizards of the Coast

== See also ==
- Ravenloft (disambiguation)
