= AD&D Masterpiece Collection =

Tabletop role-playing game supplement

- Box art with disks inside
- Developer: SSI
- Publisher: SSI
- Platform: MS-DOS
- Release: 1996
- Genre: Role-playing
- Mode: Single-player

The AD&D Masterpiece Collection is a collection of role-playing games for MS-DOS, produced by Mindscape/SSI in 1996.

== Contents ==
The Masterpiece Collection is a boxed set which included six official AD&D licensed SSI video games: Dark Sun: Shattered Lands (1993), Dark Sun: Wake of the Ravager (1994), Ravenloft: Strahd's Possession (1994), Ravenloft: Stone Prophet (1995), Al-Qadim: The Genie's Curse (1994), and Menzoberranzan (1994). All of these games are stored on four CD-ROMs, which also include the game manuals in Adobe Acrobat format in their original layout, allowing them to be printed out.

== Reception ==
Andy Butcher reviewed the Masterpiece Collection for Arcane magazine, rating it a 6 out of 10 overall. He concluded that "six complete PC roleplaying games in one rather impressive box is certainly good value for the money". He noted that an Acrobat viewer is included to read and print the manuals, which allowed SSI to "save on the cost of including six relatively hefty booklets. Of course, if you haven't got access to a printer this isn't going to be very useful, but most of the games are fairly simple to get to grips with, provided you have at least a passing familiarity with the AD&D rules". He only felt that Wake of the Ravager, Stone Prophet, and The Genie's Curse were actually any good, and that the rest "struggle to attain varying degrees of averageness". Despite that, he did conclude that "even three decent (if not quite inspired) computer games for the price of one is still a great bargain - there's enough gameplay in this set to keep you going for several months at least". PC Joker gave the collection a "very good" rating.
