= Ravenloft: Stone Prophet =

1995 video game

- Cover art by Clyde Caldwell
- Developer: DreamForge Intertainment
- Publisher: Strategic Simulations
- Designer: Christopher L. Straka
- Programmers: Mike Breitkreutz; Thomas J. Holmes; Don Wuenschell
- Artists: Jane Yeager; Craig Mrusek
- Composer: Jamie McMenamy
- Series: Ravenloft
- Platform: MS-DOS
- Release: 1995
- Genre: Role-playing video game
- Mode: Single-player

Ravenloft: Stone Prophet is a fantasy role-playing video game developed by DreamForge Intertainment for MS-DOS and published by Strategic Simulations in 1995.

== Gameplay ==
Combat scene

The game is a follow-up to Ravenloft: Strahd's Possession and uses the same engine as its predecessor. The game presents a real-time, three dimensional view from the character's perspective. In contrast to other contemporary first person RPGs, the game features (optional) non-block-related fluid movement of the characters navigating through the world. While based on rules from the AD&D 2nd edition, there are several alterations. The CD version features spoken dialogue as well as extensive pre-rendered cutscenes.

== Plot ==
The game is based on the Ravenloft campaign setting for the Dungeons & Dragons fantasy role-playing game. Although it is a follow-up to Strahd's Possession, it plays in a completely different environment. In the intro of the game, the two player characters are sent by Lord Dhelt to investigate a wall of fire which has suddenly appeared, and they end up in a hazardous desert called Har'Akir. Once a prosperous Egyptian themed place, the few remaining villagers are haunted by the creatures of the corrupted mummies of their last pharaoh Anhktepot and his high priest Hierophant, whose actions devastated the land and are unfolded in the course of the game. To break the curse of the land, the two player characters can take another two adventurers into their group, as well as meeting several distinctive individuals during the game.

== Development and release ==
Ravenloft: Stone Prophet was developed by DreamForge Intertainment, using the same proprietary game engine behind its titles Ravenloft: Strahd's Possession and Menzoberranzan.

This game was later included in the 1996 compilation set, the AD&D Masterpiece Collection. In October 2015, the game was re-released on GOG.com, bundled with the previous game Strahd's Possession, with support for Microsoft Windows, OS X, and Linux pre-packed with DOSBox.

== Reception ==
Reception

Review scores
Publication	Score
PC Gamer (UK)	84%
PC Gamer (US)	79%
Electronic Entertainment	4/5
Computer Game Review	80/79/80

Scorpia from Computer Gaming World called the game "a worthy quest" and "a big step up from the disappointments of Menzoberranzan and Wake of the Ravager". In PC Gamer US, T. Liam McDonald wrote that "this type of game seems almost retro now, but if you still like first-person RPGs, it's certainly a good one". John Houlihan of PC Gamer UK wrote that Stone Prophet is "a solid, enjoyable RPG that succeeds by not trying to be too much. If only all of SSI's AD&D games had been this good".

Reviewing the game for Electronic Entertainment, Al Giovetti summarized Stone Prophet as "a must-have for AD&D fans and beginning role players, with plot and conversation playing as important a role as hack-and-slash". He believed that it was an "excellent all-around product [that] delivers fresh sound and visuals, solid game play, and a compelling plot".

In January 1998, PC Zone included Stone Prophet on its list of the top 10 computer role-playing games. The editors remarked that it was "a great improvement" over Strahd's Possession, and that its "intuitive spell/combat system is a joy" despite the game's unimpressive visuals. According to GameSpy, "while the game was quite good in most respects, it fell down a bit thanks to a disappointing ending. Still, a commendable effort from SSI and DreamForge".
