= Deathlord =

1987 video game

- Publisher: Electronic Arts
- Producer: Sheldon Safir
- Designers: Al Escudero; David Wong
- Artist: Nancy L. Fong
- Platforms: Apple II, Commodore 64
- Release: 1987
- Genre: Role-playing
- Mode: Single-player

Deathlord is a role-playing video game created by Al Escudero and David Wong. It was published by Electronic Arts for the Apple II and Commodore 64 in 1987. Deathlord is set in a fantasy world resembling Japan. The game has a world of 16 continents, 128 unique monsters, and 20 dungeons, yet fits on two double-density 5¼" floppy disks.

== Plot ==
The world of Lorn is under attack from the Deathlord's forces. The Emperor of Kodan has sent word asking for a party to defeat the Deathlord. The party must search the world to find seven words, six items, venture into Hell, defeat the Deathlord, and return. There is no linear path to the goals, and much of the story lies in subtext as the developer chose to keep dialog options to a minimum within the game.

== Gameplay ==
The game plays as a turn based, top down, tile mapped CRPG. The player creates a party of up to 6 characters to move about the world, searching for secrets and fighting monsters. It uses most of the keys on the keyboard, mapping them to specific actions.

There is only one save-game slot, and the game autosaves if the party moves to another location or a party member dies. A party, once killed, needs a new party to resurrect them.

Before a player can begin the game proper, they are asked to go to the utility menu and make a copy of the scenario disk. They may also import characters from other games here if they desire. Once scenario disks are created, the player then creates their party of 6 characters from the 8 races and 16 classes available. Parties aren't limited to just 6 characters, and players can keep a roster of other characters to switch out in the future, but if they do so, the existing party will be returned to the starting point of the game.

== Development ==
Originally, the game was intended to have a Norse/Teutonic theme, But the marketing department at Electronic Arts gave Al Escudero 5 weeks to change the assets (art, story, spell names, equipment names, location names, etc.).

Deathlord came in an album style box and included two double sided disks, the first containing a side for booting the game and a side containing utilities, while the other disk was the scenario disk containing the unaltered version of the game world. The box also included a paper manual and quick reference card. The utility disk would let players import characters from The Bard's Tale, Wizardry and Ultima III, as well as rename characters.

Richard Garriott of Origin Systems believed that Deathlord unduly resembled Origin's Ultima games. He ended Origin's affiliation with EA after the company published it, and later Ultima games included a pirate character named Pirt Snikwah.

== Reception ==
Computer Gaming World's Scorpia in 1988 described Deathlord as "A mediocre effort at best" and "a compendium of standard CRPG features glossed over with a tinge of pseudo-Orientalism by pasting Japanese names on as much as they could". Criticisms included poor documentation, poor class balance, and meaningless character alignment. The game hid the townspeople with important pieces of information, making mapping necessary, and frequently the player had to search many squares in an area for an important item. She described a dungeon as "one of the most idiotic dungeons ever", with a two-level maze of locked and fake doors, with a diagonal passage full of teleports and fake walls above. Without a lack of mapping aids, this was very difficult, especially in sixteen-level dungeons that did not contribute to the story. In 1993, Scorpia called the game "poorly designed and implemented mishmash with a quasi-Ultima look", "extremely pointless", and "definitely one to avoid".

Compute! discussed the game's high difficulty and poor quality of the manual. The magazine stated that Deathlord was not the most impressive game, but was a good one.
