= Pumpkin Adventure III: The Hunt for the Unknown =

1995 video game

- Developer(s): Umax
- Publisher(s): Sunrise Foundation
- Platform(s): MSX2
- Release: 1995
- Genre(s): Role-playing game

Pumpkin Adventure III: The Hunt for the Unknown is a video game for the MSX2, created by Umax and released in 1995 by Sunrise Foundation. It is a role-playing game with a turn-based fighting system.

== Synopsis ==
Los Angeles is under attack by strange creatures. Nobody knows where these creatures are from or who sent them. As a last hope the L.A. government sets up a special police team: S.O.D.O.M. But even S.O.D.O.M. is not able to stop the threat. As a last resort the brilliant professor Steinein uses his time machine to find the most brave people in history. These people are Steve, Damien and the Bishop, who stopped Lucifer from taking over the world in Pumpkin Adventure 2. These three, together with S.O.D.O.M. member Jeff Tates, start their quest to find the source of the creatures and destroy it.
