= Verne World =

1995 video game

- Official box art of Verne World
- Developer: Dual
- Publisher: Banpresto
- Designers: Kunio Ohgawara; Futoshi Nagara
- Programmers: Naoki Suzuki; Tsutomu Takano; Kureaki Takahashi; Saburou Matsuoka
- Composer: Ryuichi Nitta
- Platform: Super Famicom
- Release: JP: September 29, 1995
- Genre: Role-playing video game
- Mode: Single-player

Verne World (ヴェルヌ・ワールド, Verunu Wārudo) is a role-playing video game that was released for the Super Famicom exclusively for the Japanese market. The game revolves around the main character being trapped in a theme park based around the works of Jules Verne such as A Journey to the Center of the Earth and Twenty Thousand Leagues Under the Seas.

== Plot ==
Fighting a battle against some animatronic French maids.

The player controls a young man visiting a theme park (which is shaped like seven interconnected islands) with his little brother during the summer of 2028. The player soon finds out that he is trapped inside the park by himself. Enemies include an animatronic screw, SD Gundams, and a man that transforms into a drilling rig.

At the final level of the game, players must battle a nefarious version of Jules Verne himself in order to determine the fate of the theme park.

== Gameplay ==
While players start out as incredibly incompetent in battle, they eventually start hitting the target monsters more frequently after leveling up. Players start out with an unusually high number of hit points but can easily die, although they have access to healing services. Healing is done by eating food items at a restaurant, as opposed to sleeping at an inn. Players use items like bamboo sticks and basketballs as weapons against the enemies, which are fought in a manner similar to the Romancing SaGa video game series.

Some of the allies included in the game are a young girl in a wheelchair and a young boy from India. Other allies include main characters from Jules Verne's novels, like Passepartout and Mr. Fogg from Around the World in Eighty Days, for example.

== See also ==
- Tenshi no Uta
- Cosmic Fantasy
- Psycho Dream
