= Dunjax =

2000 video game

Dunjax is an early third-person shooter computer game. It was created by Jeff Mather for MS-DOS in the early 1990s. It was subsequently (2000) released for Microsoft Windows.

The game is set on an alien planet, where the hero travels through caves searching for his spacecraft's lost engine. Along the way, he encounters gargoyles, tornadoes, evil doppelgängers, ninjas, lava, and bomb-dropping flower creatures, among other things. The game has six levels, which get progressively more difficult. As with many computer games, there are several hidden cheats. Mather's other games are Silmar and Navjet.
