= Depth Dwellers =

1994 video game

- Developer: TriSoft
- Publishers: TriSoft; TriSoft Legacy
- Designers: Bradley N. Bell; Elizabeth A. Piegari
- Programmer: Bradley N. Bell
- Platform: MS-DOS
- Release: 1994
- Genre: First-person shooter
- Mode: Single-player

Depth Dwellers is a first-person shooter released in 1994 by TriSoft for MS-DOS. The game was designed to work with 3D glasses. It was also included with the Woobo Electronics CyberBoy unit. Being released in June for the first time as a shareware product, it predated Raven Software's Heretic by six months in being possibly the first game to feature a pseudo-3D engine that allowed players to look up and down freely. The game also permitted ducking and jumping, which were still uncommon abilities in most first-person video games of that era.

== Plot ==
Title screen

The player is assigned to journey into the Zendle mines to accomplish what his beloved Princess Aurora could not: to rescue the Depth Dwelling men of Ora from the evil Ri of Riase.

== Gameplay ==
The object of the game is for the player to make it to the exit teleporter in every level. Throughout each level, the player can destroy robotic enemies, free slaves, find secrets and collect treasure for bonus points. Wherever there is a locked door, the player is required to find one of two keys to unlock it. The player makes use of only firearms and if exhausted of ammo, cannot attack anymore. Secret areas can be accessed by interacting with walls that present some differences in appearance.

== Reception ==
Reception

Review score
Publication	Score
PC Zone	4/5

PC Zone claimed that the game was like a bizarre cross between Doom and Blake Stone, leaving much to be desired but having its own gentle charm. The review negatively scored the bad sound design and the flat sprites, calling them "unexciting". Computer Gaming World regarded the graphics as slightly better than Wolfenstein 3D, praising the realistic sounds and gameplay but criticizing the limited save slot system.
