= The Dark Heart of Uukrul =

1989 video game

- IBM PC cover art
- Developer: Digital Studios Limited
- Publishers: Broderbund; Moon Books Publishing
- Designers: Ian Boswell; Martin Buis
- Platforms: Apple II, MS-DOS
- Release: Apple II: NA: 1989; MS-DOS: NA: 1990
- Genre: Role-playing
- Mode: Single-player

The Dark Heart of Uukrul is a turn-based fantasy role-playing video game written by Ian Boswell and Martin Buis of Digital Studios Limited and published by Broderbund in 1989 for the Apple II and in 1990 for IBM PC compatibles. It was re-published by Moon Books Publishing.

The first-person game comprises a classic party of four heroes (fighter, paladin, priest and magician) trying to defeat the evil wizard Uukrul and re-conquer the city of Eriosthé, going through many puzzles and riddles. It has a classic top-view, turn-based combat system and a pseudo-3D first-person perspective for exploration. The party can also cast magic spells or pray to whimsical gods, and despite its primitive graphics, there are many enemy variations. However, it's noted that the strong points of the game include the puzzles, secrets, level design, and riddles around them, beyond the hack-and-slash and vast mazes.

In 2020, The Dark Heart of Uukrul was made available on GOG.com.

== Plot ==
Four adventurers are sent to the abandoned remnants of the once-great underground city of Eriosthé. Their mission, as stated by the Western Council, is to defeat the evil Uukrul, a dark magician of incredible power, who ages ago overthrew the Ancients of the city, and claimed all of its passages and caverns as his dominion. Now Eriosthé is plagued by monsters and the minions of Uukrul. Fearing Uukrul will attack the western lands, 18 months back the Council sent a party led by one Mara, but without news a new party must be assembled.

However, there's a way to achieve this seemingly impossible task. To reach the greatest possible powers, Uukrul detached his soul from his body, and stored his heart of dark stone somewhere within the furthest reaches of the maze-like passages of Eriosthé. Access to the heart is in turn opened by several other hearts, which must be found behind battles with fierce enemies, hidden at secret places, or guarded by inscrutable riddles.

== Gameplay ==
The four adventurers are each of a different class: a fighter, a magician, a priest and a paladin. Each one has unique characteristics. The fighter and paladin are capable of wearing and using the heaviest gear and weapons, and dealing the highest physical damage. The paladin can also lay hands over a foe to do damage, or over a party member to heal. The magician uses wits to cast spells from five disciplines for different effects: damaging, healing, discovering secret doors, translating unknown texts, etc. Finally, the priest invokes four different gods through prayers, and each prayer has a certain effect, some similar to the magician's spells, and others unique to the priest. But the gods are whimsical or can be angered, so often prayers aren't answered, and sometimes the god smites back the priest for disturbing their godly rest.

At the game's start, certain characteristics of each party member are decided through a series of questions which can, for example, create an agile warrior capable of dodging enemy's attacks at the cost of lesser damage dealt, or a bulky warrior not so able to evade or parry attacks but dealing much more damage in each successful hit.

The exploration system is in first-person perspective, with a simple 3D effect. One important feature of the game is its auto-map: when viewing the map, squares already explored are marked as such. Therefore, there is no need to use a paper and pencil to draw the map, although in certain areas there's a fog preventing viewing the map at all. The city itself is divided in zones, and to move from one zone to the next, the party must pass through sanctuaries. The sanctuaries are the only place where the game can be saved, and has also a cache to save items, the party can rest and recover health points, etc. The first time the party enters any given sanctuary, all wounds and illnesses are cured. Visiting a sanctuary when a character has enough experience points also makes that character advance a level up to the maximum level of 15.

Entering the sanctuary requires using one of four soul amulets which came printed with the game. These copy-protection printouts are used to decode the secret word to open the door to the sanctuary. Many runes and scriptures found in the walls of the city are also written with the same glyphs. Entering a sanctuary only requires the secret word the first time, afterwards it can be entered freely. Sanctuaries also have teleports to other sanctuaries and special places.

The zone past the sanctuary Urlasar has most of the remaining inhabited Eriosthé, such as shops, the temple, the mausoleum, the guild, the shrines and somewhat deeper the circle of magicians. One thing to take care of is that the party needs supplies to keep exploring. If food depletes, the party will start to lose health points and even die eventually. At the shrines and the circle of magicians, the priest and magician can acquire new rings if their level is high enough, in the case of the priest to have more chances to pray successfully, and in the case of the magician to access higher level spells. In case a party member dies, the body can be brought to the temple and resurrection can be attempted. In case it fails, a new member for the party can be found and chosen between several candidates at the guild.

During the exploration, packs of monsters can attack randomly, mostly in open areas. Certain places trigger the attack of specific foes too, and the deeper in Eriosthé the party goes, the harder the monsters are. The battles themselves are turn based, first with a movement phase and then with an attack phase. Everything is done on an overhead view, where small square icons represent the party members and the foes. Besides moving and attacking, the priest can pray, the magician can cast spells, and other actions like retreat can be triggered.

While exploring caverns and mazes, there are clues about where to find hidden doors, the key to advancing the story, but some doors are impenetrable to magic or prayers, and riddles and puzzles must be solved to open them - mechanically or through a secret word.

== Development ==
The game was created by Ian Boswell and Martin Buis while they were studying as a pet project over the course of several years. Once Broderbund agreed to publish the game, they needed another year to complete it, all on a very limited budget. The MS-DOS version supported CGA, EGA, and VGA graphics.

The game has neither music nor sound on both Apple II and MS-DOS platforms.

== Reception ==
The Dark Heart of Uukrul was unsuccessful, selling fewer than 5,000 copies despite good reviews. According to Boswell, Broderbund—not known for computer RPGs—did not market or advertise the game, launched at the end of the Apple II's life.

Computer Gaming World's Scorpia in 1993 called Uukrul "a standard dungeon-delving expedition with some interesting points, not least of which is the best auto-mapping in any game to date". She approved of the balanced combat and unusual ending, but warned that the puzzles made the game "not for those seeking only hack-and-slash entertainment". Crooked Bee from RPG Codex praised Uukrul for the different challenges the player faces while progressing through the game, and for "some of the best dungeon, puzzle and character development design in the history of the genre". She also liked the balance between elements, and its clever design.

== Legacy ==
The Dark Heart of Uukrul was legally unavailable for sale for many years until a fan named Scott "Kill0byt3" Greig was able to get in touch with the original developers and re-release it on GOG.com in 2020. Unfortunately, Greig died in March of that year due to an undisclosed cause. GOG.com dedicated the re-release to his name.
