= Curse of Dragor =

1995 role-playing video game

- Developer: Banshee Software
- Publisher: Domark
- Platform: Macintosh
- Release: 1995
- Genre: Role playing game
- Mode: Single Player

Curse of Dragor is a 1995 fantasy role playing video game for the Macintosh, developed by Banshee Software and published by Domark.

== Gameplay ==
The game has many features in common with other dungeon crawlers of its type. Players are first tasked with creating a party of four characters from a variety of classes, each with its own strengths and weaknesses. The plot involves a group of adventurers seeking to free the land of Xorinth from the curse laid upon it by the evil Prince Dragor. Battles take place in real-time (as opposed to turn-based combat) with a set number of experience points awarded for each monster slain. Additional experience can also be gained by solving the various puzzles scattered throughout the game. As the characters level up, their abilities improve, and they will be able to equip stronger weapons.

== Reception ==
Reception

Review scores
Publication	Score
Next Generation	2/5
PC Games	B

Next Generation reviewed the Macintosh version of the game, rating it two stars out of five, and stated that "Once you're past the game itself (unfortunately, we mean it) Curse is an impressive product. Graphics, sound, and control are all excellent, and the game has enough twists and turns to keep a player who does like the basic nature of the product playing for hours. In the end, while it's by no means a bad game, Curse of Dragor is a holdover from a genre that has run out of steam." Writing for PC Games, Steve Klett concluded, "[I]f you have the patience, Curse of Dragor brings a compelling fantasy experience to a Macintosh world without many role-playing options." The Macintosh Bible recommended Curse of Dragor to "very serious role-players" due to its combination of intuitive interface and challenging gameplay.

The Hartford Courant called Curse of Dragor a game for "people who spend hours upon hours on the computer" and for fans of Dungeons & Dragons. To make any progress requires a substantial amount of time "to submerge yourself sufficiently in the atmosphere, the complex story line and the vast number of options for action." The review criticized the game's "mystifying" interface, praised its graphics in spite of the small size of the playing screen, and noted its "gruesome" and "sometimes morbid fixation on death."

Computer Player magazine rated Curse of Dragor 5 out of 10, saying its "only plus is its rich storyline." The review called the game "extremely dull" with minimal sound effects, no music, and "too few puzzles for a game that tries to be a graphic adventure." Micromanaging the well-being and progress of the party was "an arduous responsibility that quickly becomes tedious". The review concluded that the game was "a strange mix of RPG and graphic adventure that ultimately doesn't provide enough interactivity and sheer entertainment to make it a worthy investment."

Inside Mac Games rated Curse of Dragor 3 out 5, praising the game's auto-mapping feature and calling the storyline "much more interesting than the usual 'There's a bad guy who lives in this tower' approach." The review criticized the esoteric puzzles, save game and install size given the relatively short game length, and the frequent bugs resulting in crashes.

== Reviews ==
- Mac Game Gate (1999)
