= Down in the Dumps =

1996 video game

- Developer: Haiku Studios
- Publisher: Philips Media
- Director: Hervé Lange; Olivier Cordoléani
- Platforms: MS-DOS, Windows, Macintosh
- Release: EU: 1996; EU: 1997 (Mac)
- Genre: Adventure
- Mode: Single-player

Down in the Dumps is a 1996 adventure game developed for MS-DOS and Microsoft Windows, by the French Haiku Studios and published by Philips Media. The release for Macintosh was published in 1997. Versions for the PlayStation, Sega Saturn and Philips CD-i were slated for 1996, but never released.

== Plot ==
Game interface

The game's storyline is about the Blubs, an extraterrestrial family (father and mother Blub, their son and daughter, the grandparents and their pet Stinkie), who crash with their spaceship on a landfill on Earth after being pursued by the villainous Khan and his criminal associates. After surviving the crash, the Blub family goes on to live on the landfill, while trying to repair their damaged spaceship in order to return home. The player is set out on a mission by grandfather Blub, an inventor and the spaceship's technician, to find the missing parts needed to reconstruct the spaceship. Meanwhile, Khan, whose ship also crashed on the landfill after the pursuit of the Blub family, sends out his minions to frustrate the efforts of the Blubs.

== Gameplay ==
Screenshot showing the visual style of the cutscenes

The game consists of five parts called "toons", all set in the landfill – except for part five which takes place in space – featuring one or two of the Blub family members as playable characters. The five sections are titled "The Blub, the Rat and the Bad Guy", "The Hypnotic Machine", "The Abominable Robin Blub", "The Bum" and "The End". Each has its own distinct visual theme, although the overall visual style is very cartoon-like. For example, the player visits the head of a homeless person ("bum") and a society inhabited by frogs, where a series of events somewhat reminiscent of the Robin Hood story is triggered.

The player has to solve different puzzles in order to advance the plot by using a point and click interface. Large portions of the plot are told by pre-rendered cinematics, often triggered at the beginning or the end of a "toon".
