= Advanced Dungeons & Dragons: Slayer =

1994 video game

- North American cover art by Keith Parkinson
- Developer: Lion Entertainment
- Publishers: NA: Strategic Simulations; EU: Mindscape; JP: T&E Soft
- Director: Ronald Bolinger
- Producer: Douglas Grounds
- Programmer: Glen Merriman
- Artist: Daniel Bourbonnais
- Composer: Billy Wolfe
- Series: Dungeons & Dragons
- Platform: 3DO
- Release: NA: September 1994; EU: 1995; JP: January 20, 1995
- Genres: Dungeon crawl, action role-playing
- Mode: Single-player

Advanced Dungeons & Dragons: Slayer is a fantasy first-person, dungeon crawl / action role-playing game based on the second edition of Advanced Dungeons & Dragons. The game was developed by Lion Entertainment and published by Strategic Simulations in 1994 for the 3DO Interactive Multiplayer. A Japanese version titled Lost Dungeon (ロストダンジョン) was published by T&E Soft the following year.

== Gameplay ==
Ankheg attacking

Slayer features a customizable dungeon generator so each time the player starts the game, they are faced with a new dungeon. The dungeon always ends with a boss floor, randomly selected from several possible bosses. When starting a new game, the player may either create a custom character with randomly generated stats, pick from a selection of preset characters, or reuse a previously created character. The game may be saved at any time, but is limited to a single save slot.

== Development and release ==
Slayer was developed as part of a contract between video game corporation SSI and TSR, the owner and publisher of the tabletop role-playing game Dungeons & Dragons. SSI had previously used the license to adapt the property into a number of notable games including Pool of Radiance, the Gold Box series, and Eye of the Beholder. For Slayer, SSI gave development duties to Lion Entertainment, an Austin, Texas-based studio founded by Douglas Grounds in June 1993. Grounds was also a producer at The 3DO Company's Austin office. Lion Entertainment's principle staff for Slayer consisted of director Ronald Bollinger; programmer Glen Merriman; music composer Billy Wolfe; sound editor Geoffrey Sanders; art director Daniel Bourbonnais; and artists Daniel Bourbonnais, Martin Thomas, Sara Farr, and Rebecca Price. Grounds served as executive producer while assisting on programming. The game's 3D modeling and rendering were done by Grounds, Bollinger, and Sanders.

Slayer was released exclusively for the 3DO Interactive Multiplayer by SSI in North America in September 1994 and by SSI's parent company Mindscape in Europe in 1995. The game was published by T&E Soft in Japan on January 20, 1995, under the title Lost Dungeon. Computer Gaming World reported months ahead of the game's scheduled launch that SSI and TSR were dissolving their partnership and that Slayer would be one of the last products in that agreement. A version for the PlayStation was announced for an October 1995 release but never materialized. SSI and Lion Entertainment did collaborate on a sequel to Slayer titled Advanced Dungeons & Dragons: DeathKeep, released on 3DO in 1995 and Windows in 1996. Lion Entertainment went on to port several popular first-person shooters including Doom II, Duke Nukem 3D, and Quake to Macintosh before voluntarily closing in 1999.

== Reception and legacy ==
Reception

Review scores
Publication	Score
Computer and Video Games	59%
Electronic Gaming Monthly	35/50
GamePro	15.5/20
GamesMaster	80%
Génération 4	79%
Joystick	75%
M! Games	71%
Mega Fun	58%
Next Generation	2/5
Video Games (DE)	52%
VideoGames & Computer Entertainment	6/10
3DO Magazine	4/5
Ação Games	23/30
Electronic Entertainment	4/5
Electronic Games	B+

Award
Publication	Award
Electronic Games	"Best Multimedia Adventure/RPG Game" (1995)

GamePro gave the game a generally positive review, saying it successfully combines fast-paced action in a Wolfenstein 3D vein with traditional RPG gameplay. They criticized the music and lack of sound effects, but praised the abundance of options and the varied dungeon layouts, and commented that the adjustable difficulty makes the game appropriate for players of all ages.

Next Generation was generally negative to the game and gave it 2 stars out of 5.

Allen Rausch for GameSpy called Slayer "a fantastic game" for how rare it is, and that it "was actually one of the better games" for the 3DO system.

Concordia University professor and author Mark J. P. Wolf noted Slayer as an example of a game that utilizes handcrafted assets (including walls, doors, and windows) to give each of its dungeons a deliberate feel in their design despite a reliance on random, procedural generation for their layouts.
