= Designasaurus =

1988 video game

- Apple II cover art
- Developer: Intergalactic Development
- Publishers: Britannica Software, DesignWare
- Designer: Ezra Sidran
- Platforms: Amiga, Apple II, Apple IIGS, Commodore 64, MS-DOS
- Release: 1988
- Genre: Edutainment

Designasaurus is an educational game created by Ezra Sidran and published by Britannica Software. It was released for Amiga, Apple II, Apple IIGS, Commodore 64, and MS-DOS. The game is about creating a custom dinosaur and helping it survive. It is divided into three activities: "Walk-a-Dinosaur", "Build-a-Dinosaur" and "Print-a-Dinosaur".

== Development ==
In 1987, Ezra Sidran signed a contract with Britannica Software for the development of an educational dinosaur game. Shortly before signing the contract, Sidran graduated from Marycrest College and received a computer animation degree. Sidran insisted that Designasaurus not be looked at as a game due to it being educational and accurate. Many of Sidran's friends in the same computer animation program helped him complete the game's artwork. One of the game's developers was Edward Isenberg. Isenberg said of the game in 2012, "This was a low resolution, two dimensional game because it was in the early 90s. You'd be able to walk the dinosaur from one side of the screen to the other and see if you could avoid being eaten."

== Gameplay ==
The game consists of three parts which is the game itself, creating a dinosaur, and printing coloring pages of dinosaurs. To create a dinosaur, a paleontologist of the Museum of Natural History allows the player to use bones from its collection to build their own dinosaur. Every design details the likelihood of the final dinosaur surviving. The game part of the software lets the player control their created dinosaur to help it survive while navigating its environment. The software includes a Dinosaur Hall of Fame certificate after the successful completion of the game and 12 dinosaur pictures which can be printed on t-shirts.

== Reception ==
The Software Publishers Association named Designasaurus as the "best education software of 1987". In the 1988 CODiE Awards, the game won "Best Educational Program" and "Best Pre-school or Primary School Program." It was reported on November 27, 1989, that Designasaurus and UMS I together gained $5 1/2 million for the publisher Intergalactic over an 18-month period. According to the creator Sidran, the royalties were split between the employees via a "gross-sharing" plan.

Kathryn Carrington of Hartford Courant said that the game was "disappointing" and that she "expected more" due to the game winning an award from the Software Publishers Association. PC Gamer reviewer Richard Cobbett wrote, "Unlike many edutainment games, Designasaurus does at least offer a solid amount of 'tainment' with its 'edu', and it's fun to mess around with. It has a few nice features, like being able to print out your dinosaurs, and the added hilarity of later levels developing into almost bullet-hell levels of crap to wade through."

== Later releases ==
A sequel, Designasaurus II, was released in 1990 for MS-DOS. Aided by two paleontologists, Britannica Software was able to accurately include dinosaurs in the correct time periods they once existed. Sidran and Isenberg started a funding campaign for an updated version of the game on Kickstarter in 2012.
