= Ruin Arm =

1995 video game

- Cover art
- Developer: Tose
- Publisher: Bandai
- Platform: Super Famicom
- Release: JP: June 23, 1995
- Genre: Action role-playing game
- Modes: Single-player, multiplayer

Ruin Arm (ルインアーム) is a 1995 action role-playing video game for the Super Famicom.

== Release and reception ==
Reception

Review score
| Publication | Score |
|---|---|
| Famitsu | 6/10, 6/10, 5/10, 6/10 |

Ruin Arm was released in Japan for the Super Famicom on June 23, 1995.

In Famicom Tsūshin, two reviewers commented on the controls, with one saying they felt sluggish for any action-oriented elements. Another saying that the single-player with a co-op partners was difficult as they other character doesn't always behave as expected and controlling it with a second controller is frustrating. One player said everything in the game felt overtly famliar while another said that players would grow bored before getting to anything unique the game has to offer.
