= Haiku Studios =

Defunct video game developer

- Industry: Video game software and programming
- Founded: 1993
- Defunct: 1997
- Fate: Bankrupt
- Headquarters: France
- Key people: Olivier Cordoleani; Hervé Lange
- Products: Adventure games
- Number of employees: 11-50

Haiku Studios was a video game developer based in France, founded by Olivier Cordoleani and Hervé Lange in 1993. Cordoleani and Lange both worked on Iron and Flame (Atari), B.A.T. (1990, Ubisoft) and B.A.T. II - The Koshan Conspiracy (1992, Ubisoft) under the name Computer's Dream during the 1980s. The name Haiku Studios was coined in 1993 and consisted of Computer's Dream and several other developers.

The company developed Down in the Dumps, which was published by Philips Media for MS-DOS, Microsoft Windows and Apple Macintosh in 1996.

A further three games were in development when the company went out of business in 1997:

- Demon Driver, a 3D racing game
- Moreau, believed to be a tie-in to the 1996 movie The Island of Dr. Moreau
- Elric the Necromancer, an action role-playing game
