= DeathKeep =

1995 video game

- Developer: Lion Entertainment
- Publisher: Strategic Simulations
- Director: Ronald Bolinger
- Producer: Ronald Bolinger
- Programmers: Bob Pendleton; Glen Merriman
- Composer: Billy Wolfe
- Series: Dungeons & Dragons
- Platforms: 3DO, Windows
- Release: November 1995 (3DO); May 27, 1996 (Win)
- Genres: First-person shooter, role-playing
- Mode: Single-player

DeathKeep is a 1995 video game based on the Dungeons & Dragons fantasy role-playing game. It was released on the 3DO platform, and later converted to the PC. The game is a sequel to Advanced Dungeons & Dragons: Slayer.

== Plot ==
DeathKeep is a game in which the player character explores a large castle to find three orbs which are needed to defeat the powerful evil necromancer that has taken over the castle.

== Gameplay ==
DeathKeep is a first-person dungeon crawler where the player can choose to play a dwarven fighter, an elven mage, or a half-elf fighter-mage.

== Reception ==
Reception

Review scores
Publication	Score
Next Generation	3/5 (3DO); 1/5 (PC)
Arcane	2/10 (PC)

Reviewing the 3DO version, a critic for Next Generation praised the graphical textures but said the game is frustratingly difficult, particularly criticizing the imprecise controls when making the character come to a stop and the need to pass over some objects multiple times before the game registers the contact. Despite its flaws, he said that the dungeons are "ingeniously" designed, the game is huge, and on the whole, it's interesting enough to warrant a look at it. GamePro's The Game Elf gave it a rave review, applauding the huge amount of content, accessible menus, "smooth" control, rendered graphics with fully 3D point-of-view, detailed visuals, and "unnerving" sound effects.

Andy Butcher reviewed the PC version of Deathkeep for Arcane magazine. He commented that "the original version for the 3DO console was less than inspiring, and this substandard conversion to the PC is even less so". Butcher concluded that Deathkeep suffers from bad graphics, low-quality sound and uninspiring gameplay, and called it one of the worst games released on the PC, and recommended Hexen instead. A Next Generation critic similarly said that the 3DO version was passable but the PC conversion is poor, with "jerky play control, blocky and pixelated graphics, and awkward keyboard configuration".

According to GameSpy, DeathKeep was "the last Dungeons & Dragons game for SSI, and it was a pretty ignominious end for a pretty distinguished run".
