= Disciples of Steel =

1991 role-playing video game

- Developer(s): Megasoft Entertainment
- Publisher(s): FormGen
- Platform(s): MS-DOS, Atari ST
- Release: WW: 1991
- Genre(s): Role-playing
- Mode(s): Single-player

Disciples of Steel is a role-playing video game developed by American studio Megasoft Entertainment and published in 1991 by FormGen for MS-DOS and Atari ST.

== Gameplay ==
Disciples of Steel is a role-playing game.

== Reception ==
James V. Trunzo reviewed Disciples of Steel in White Wolf #47 (Sept., 1994), rating it a 3 out of 5 and stated that "If you're into nostalgia, Disciples of Steel should suit you just fine. The game seems to borrow from almost all earlier forms of computer roleplaying [...] Though this game is good, I suggest you take your [money] and search the bargain bins."

In 1996, Computer Gaming World declared Disciples of Steel the 48th-worst computer game ever released.

Disciples of Steel has received mixed reviews. On February 16, 2016 the review site CRPG Addict rated Disciples of Steel the 7th greatest classic RPG of all time.
