= DreamForge Intertainment =

American video game developer (1990–2001)

DreamForge Intertainment Inc.
- Type: Public
- Industry: Video games
- Founded: 1990
- Defunct: 2001
- Fate: Defunct
- Headquarters: Greensburg, Pennsylvania, United States
- Key people: Thomas Holmes; Christopher Straka; James Namestka

DreamForge Intertainment, Inc. was an American computer game developer.

== History ==
DreamForge was founded as Event Horizon Software, Inc. by the computer game developers Thomas Holmes, Christopher Straka and James Namestka in Greensburg. Until its dissolution the company produced several well-known and awarded computer games, most of them in the genre of role-playing games and strategy video games. After producing several games, the team changed its name to DreamForge Intertainment after learning that its Event Horizon name was shared with a developer of pornographic software.

The company was dissolved in 2001 after struggles with its publishers while working on several titles, including the never finished game Werewolf: The Apocalypse - The Heart of Gaia, as well as Myst IV, with the latter being subsequently continued by a different studio.

== List of games ==
- DarkSpyre
- Dusk of the Gods
- The Summoning
- Dungeon Hack
- Veil of Darkness
- Ravenloft: Strahd's Possession
- Menzoberranzan
- Anvil of Dawn
- Ravenloft: Stone Prophet
- Chronomaster
- War Wind
- War Wind II: Human Onslaught
- 101 Dalmatians: Escape from DeVil Manor
- Sanitarium
- TNN Outdoors Pro Hunter
- Warhammer 40,000: Rites of War

=== Unfinished ===
- Kehl: Fury Unbound (Action Adventure, Xbox)
- Legend of the Sun (RPG, Xbox)
- Myst IV
- Werewolf: The Apocalypse – The Heart of Gaia
