= DarkSpyre =

1990 video game

- Developer(s): Event Horizon
- Publisher(s): Event Horizon
- Producer(s): James H. Namestka
- Designer(s): Christopher L. Straka
- Programmer(s): Thomas J. Holmes
- Artist(s): Jane Yeager; Frank Urbaniak
- Composer(s): Ed Puskar
- Platform(s): MS-DOS, Amiga
- Release: 1990: MS-DOS; 1991: Amiga
- Genre(s): Role-playing
- Mode(s): Single-player

DarkSpyre is a 1990 video game produced by Event Horizon Software (later known as DreamForge Intertainment) for MS-DOS. It was released the following year for the Amiga. Darkspyre is a dungeon crawl style role-playing game. It uses top-down graphics and randomly generated dungeons, similar to a roguelike.

in 1992, The Summoning was released as a sequel. It did not rely on DarkSpyre's random dungeon mechanic, instead using pre-designed levels.

== Plot ==
The gods of War, Magic, and Intellect created the Darkspyre to find a champion to overcome the final challenge of mankind. The player must locate the five runes of power within Darkspyre to master the tests and prevent the destruction of the world.

== Reception ==
The game was reviewed in 1991 in Dragon #172 by Hartley, Patricia, and Kirk Lesser in "The Role of Computers" column. The reviewers gave the game 3½ out of 5 stars. The game was reviewed in Computer Gaming World in 1991, with the reviewer stating that "DarkSpyre is a fine game, well suited to gamers who enjoy true challenges."

== Reviews ==
- ASM - Mar, 1991
- Amiga Joker (Feb, 1992)
