= Menzoberranzan (video game) =

1994 video game

- Cover art by Jeff Easley
- Developer: DreamForge Intertainment
- Publisher: Strategic Simulations
- Designer: John McGirk
- Programmer: Don Wuenschell
- Artists: Jane Yeager; Frank Schurter
- Composer: Jamie McMenamy
- Platforms: MS-DOS, PC-98, FM Towns
- Release: NA: 1994; EU: 1994
- Genre: Role-playing
- Mode: Single-player

Menzoberranzan is a 1994 role-playing video game created by Strategic Simulations (SSI) and DreamForge Intertainment. Menzoberranzan uses the game engine that was used previously in SSI's Ravenloft: Strahd's Possession (1994), and is set in the Advanced Dungeons & Dragons Forgotten Realms campaign setting.

== Story ==
Menzoberranzan, a subterranean city where the Drow live, and had been introduced in the tabletop game materials two years earlier in December 1992 in a three-book box set called Menzoberranzan: The Famed City of the Drow by Ed Greenwood, R. A. Salvatore, and Douglas Niles. The game also features Drizzt Do'Urden as one of the main characters.

The game begins with the only two survivors (both chosen by the player) of a monsters-killing quest returning to a village situated somewhere in Icewind Dale, where they are celebrated for their success. However, after a night of heavy drinking, they pass out and only wake up when the village is attacked by Drow, who kidnap a number of villagers. The survivors ask the adventurers to rescue their friends and family, with the adventurers being directed towards the Underdark, where Drow civilization is situated. On their quest, the two adventurers eventually meet a number of adventurers and creatures that helps them in their mission, with them eventually joining forces with Drizzt Do'Urden, who reveals that the attack on the village was done under orders of his mother; Malice Do'Urden, in an attempt to draw him out to capture and punish him for abandoning his people. Upon arriving to Menzoberrazan, Drizzt is teleported away and captured by his mother, forcing the party to ask help from the Drow, who are in the middle of a civil war between the two most powerful families. With the help of some sympathetic and/or opportunistic Drow, they are able to defeat Malice, prevent the ritual sacrifice of Drizzt, and rescue the kidnapped villagers. Upon returning to the village, they are once again celebrated with Drizzt congratulating the adventurers for saving him.

== Gameplay ==
Combat scene

The game has elements of Ultima Underworld: The Stygian Abyss (3d world and real-time action) and its game concept is somewhat similar to Westwood's Eye of the Beholder series. The player initially creates two player characters (PCs) and can acquire non-player character (NPC) allies later in the game.

== Release ==
Menzoberranzan was published in 1994 by Strategic Simulations.

The game was later included in the 1996 compilation set, the AD&D Masterpiece Collection.

In August 2015, game distributor GOG.com released the PC version of the game along with several other Gold Box titles.

== Critical reception ==
Reception

Review scores
Publication	Score
Next Generation	3/5
PC Gamer (US)	85%
PC Zone	68 out of 100
Electronic Entertainment	5/5
CD-ROM Today	4/5

In Computer Gaming World, Scorpia wrote: "Overall, Menzoberranzan is a disappointment. It has some nice features, but nice features must be supported by a strong story. Sadly, what could have been a superior entry in the CRPG field comes off as just another hack-n-slash product". Andrew Wright of PC Zone considered it "a case of dumb dungeoneering stylishly put together", and said that it "tries to be Ultima Underworld and fails miserably". He offered praise to its graphics and interface.

A reviewer for Next Generation gave the game 3 out of 5 stars, remarking that the high-resolution graphics have a "painting-like quality" and that the gameplay is authentic to the Advanced Dungeons & Dragons franchise. T. Liam McDonald of PC Gamer US called Menzoberranzan the best Advanced Dungeons & Dragons game ever released, and praised its graphics and story, but complained that it is "combat oriented in early levels and takes its sweet time getting to the narrative elements".

In Electronic Entertainment, Al Giovetti summarized the game as "high-quality role-playing meets fast-paced first-person exploration and spectacular real-time combat", and he believed that it was "a sure bet to please role players". Ian Cole from the Quandaryland website awarded the game 3.5 stars out 5. He was critical of the slowness of the game compared to Ravenloft and that "too many places were empty — just nothing". He praises that this was not a typical hack and slash game with a focus on game statistics for the characters as well as puzzle solving. John Terra of Computer Shopper said the game "stands out" and called it a "must-have".

James V. Trunzo reviewed Menzoberranzan in White Wolf Inphobia #55 (May, 1995), rating it a 4 out of 5 and stated that "If you're one of the many who tired of the old Gold Box games from S.S.I. and you haven't tried Ravenloft or one of the Dark Sun games, you owe it to yourself to experience the new AD&D games from S.S.I. Menzoberranzan is an excellent place to start!"

According to Allen Rausch of GameSpy, "without a great plot and exciting monsters that truly utilized its spectacular setting, Menzoberranzan ended up being less impressive than it was in players' imaginations".

Dungeons and Desktops: The History of Computer Role-Playing Games said "the last TSR-licensed game SSI published is the infamously wretched (and hard to spell) Menzoberranzan, which appeared in 1994 for DOS. [...] [It] had all the ingredients necessary for a hit. [...] Nevertheless, gamers quickly complained about the endless number of boring battles that drag out the game and ruin its pacing".
