= Deathbringer (1991 video game) =

1991 video game

- Developer: Oxford Digital Enterprises
- Publisher: Empire
- Director: Rik Yapp
- Designer: John Wood
- Programmers: John Wood; Rich Horrocks
- Artist: Colin Swinbourne
- Composer: Angus Murray
- Platforms: Amiga, Atari ST, MS-DOS
- Release: September 1991: Amiga; 1991: Atari ST, DOS
- Genre: Beat 'em up
- Mode: Single-player

Deathbringer is a side-scrolling beat 'em up video game developed by Oxford DSOS Enterprises and published by Empire. It was released in 1991 for Amiga and Atari ST, and in 1991 for MS-DOS.

== Plot ==
A group of evil wizards plot to enslave the entire world, but are repeatedly stopped by Karn the Barbarian. The league of wizards forge a magic sword named Deathbringer to kill him; they perform a sacrificial ritual, summoning a demon and imbuing their soul into the sword. Karn takes the sword for himself, turning it against them. The demon that inhabits Deathbringer needs souls to stay alive; Karn must feed souls to the sword by killing monsters, and he ultimately seeks to defeat the wizards.

== Gameplay ==
The player takes the role of Karn the Barbarian who wields the eponymous sword Deathbringer, and seeks to defeat a group of evil wizards. Deathbringer has nonlinear map design: the player starts in the middle of each given level, and may move left or right to progress towards the boss. Upon reaching an exit to the level, they fight the boss; defeating them allows the player to progress to the next level, and the game has a total of 30 levels. Deathbringer has a time limit for each level in the form of the sword Deathbringer; the player must constantly kill monsters to obtain their souls, and refill a meter at the bottom of the screen that gradually decreases over time. If this meter reaches zero, it drains the player's health, ultimately killing them. When the sword's soul meter gets low, the player may lose control of their character, due to the sword taking control.

Deathbringer has 36 levels of parallax scrolling, and its graphics received polarized reviews from critics.

== Development ==
The Amiga version of Deathbringer was developed by Oxford Digital Enterprises and published by Empire. The Amiga version of Deathbringer began development in February 1991, and was released in September 1991. In a September 1991 issue of British gaming magazine The One, The One previewed Deathbringer's development. Each of Deathbringer's levels has backgrounds with 36 levels of parallax scrolling, which was achieved through using wedge-shaped tiles as opposed to square ones. As the player moves left or right, the wedge moves in the respective direction, giving the parallax effect. In Deathbringer's cave level, these 36 segments are instead curved, giving the cave walls a tubular effect. Deathbringer's graphics were originally created out-of-house by Colin Swinbourne, a freelance graphic designer, and Swinbourne's art was then adapted into sprites in Deluxe Paint III. Deathbringer initially had placeholder sound effects made by the Oxford Digital team themselves, but the sound effects in the final version were produced by Skinnybone Productions, and has 'over 116' 57Khz sampled sounds. In indoor levels, reverb was added to give the illusion of an echo. Due to the number of sound effects in Deathbringer, the game has only one music track. Deathbringer's music was produced out-of-house by Angus Murray, who was chosen after submitting a demo tape to Oxford Digital.

The Amiga version of Deathbringer was released on two floppy disks.

== Reception ==
Reception

Review scores
Publication	Score
The One for ST Games	80% (Atari ST)
ST Format	72% (Atari ST)
Power Play	61% (MS-DOS)
PC Joker	41% (MS-DOS)
Amiga Joker	37% (Amiga)

ST Format gave the Atari ST version an overall score of 72%, noting the game's graphics as its strongest feature, stating that it "uses so many levels of parallax the effect looks almost perfect." ST Format criticizes the game as 'priorizing looks over function' however, expressing that "it looks as if the programmers have spent the time getting the parallax right without thinking about the game itself." ST Format criticized Deathbringer's gameplay as repetitive, summarizing it as "a matter of moving towards the next [level], killing numerous creatures on the way", expressing that the difficulty of the monsters and the landscapes are "about the only things that change", further stating that 'it doesn't have much to it'.

German gaming magazine Power Play gave the MS-DOS version of Deathbringer an overall score of 61%, praising its "fantastic" music, "fast" parallax scrolling and "bright & colorful" graphics, but criticized its 'unoriginal' gameplay. Power Play further stated that Deathbringer's style of gameplay "has been around for five years", further criticizing its 'limited' array of enemies, and summarizing its style of play as having "less strategy and more button mashing." Power Play praised Deathbringer as 'technically sound', and called its soul meter mechanic "a great idea".

German gaming magazine Amiga Joker gave the Amiga version of Deathbringer an overall score of 37%, criticizing it was 'short' and 'unsubstantial', stating that "there's not much to see". Amiga Joker criticized Deathbringer's graphics, calling its parallax scrolling "shaky", expressed that the game 'gets less and less colorful' as the game goes on, and stated that "unfortunately only the animation of the sprites turned out nice." Amiga Joker criticized Deathbringer's sound, lamenting the game's single music track, and called the game's sound effects "nerve-killing", overall summarizing the game as "an economy version of Beast II."

German gaming magazine PC Joker gave the MS-DOS version of Deathbringer an overall score of 41%, comparing it to Wrath of the Demon, expressing that it has 'similar shortcomings' due to the game 'prioritizing graphics over gameplay'. PC Joker criticized Deathbringer's gameplay and controls as "tedious", expressing that combat is 'a matter of luck as opposed to strategy' due to its "sluggish" controls. PC Joker further criticized Deathbringer's "simple" gameplay, expressing that "the pause function, endless continues and amount of patience required make the game pass by too fast", and furthermore said that Deathbringer is 'unsubstantial', stating that "there's nowhere near enough [content] to be anything more than a very average game". PC Joker criticized Deathbringer's graphics, stating that while its bosses are "impressive" and some of its sprites are "well animated", everything else is "simple". PC Joker also criticized Deathbringer's level design, expressing that they primarily differ by the "degree of their colorlessness".

The One for ST Games gave the Atari ST version of Deathbringer an overall score of 80%, but criticized its unoriginality. The One praised its "superb" graphics as its strongest feature, calling its parallax scrolling "one of the best seen on the ST", and its sprites and backgrounds "extremely detailed". The One criticized Deathbringer's difficulty, expressing that the game's bosses are "almost impossible" until the player figures out their pattern, at which point they're "too easy". The One praised Deathbringer's soul meter mechanics, as well as its nonlinear map design, comparing it to Out Run, but criticized the lack of visual damage when fighting opponents as 'unatmospheric'.
