= Dusk of the Gods =

1991 video game

- Cover art by Larry Elmore
- Developer: Event Horizon Software
- Publisher: Interstel Corporation
- Producer: James H. Namestka
- Designers: Christopher L. Straka; Thomas J. Holmes
- Programmer: Thomas J. Holmes
- Artists: Jane Yeager; Louis M. Kiss
- Composers: Pete Smolcic; Ed Puskar; Matt Oeler
- Platform: MS-DOS
- Release: NA: 1991
- Genre: Role-playing
- Mode: Single-player

Dusk of the Gods is an isometric-view role-playing video game developed by Event Horizon Software and published by Interstel Corporation in 1991.

== Plot ==
The game plot takes place in the time shortly before Ragnarök, an epic battle at the end of the world in Norse mythology. The player assumes the role of a fallen warrior (an Einherjar) tasked by the god Odin to attempt to change the destiny of the gods and avert their fall during the coming war. Although the title takes some liberty with the accepted mythos, most elements are well represented and hence can be considered semi-educational.

The tasks given to the player include:

- Recovering the missing head of Thor's hammer, Mjolnir.
- Finding key items needed to forge a chain to bind Fenrir.
- Strengthening Thor's fishing line, so that it doesn't break when catching the world serpent.
- Obtaining a special breastplate for Heimdall.

Once all of the tasks are completed, Heimdall can be asked to blow his horn, causing the battle of Ragnarök to commence, with the outcome then being reported to the player.

== Gameplay ==
The gameplay elements are relatively primitive, although the game does feature a large world with many areas to explore. Combat often involves the player attacking and then fleeing in order to minimize damage sustained.

Many different weapons and armor are acquired as the player travels through the various regions, growing progressively stronger with each enemy defeated. This was one of the first open world games that did not send the character on a linear path, as the player is free to explore the many maps in any order.

== Reception ==
Allen L. Greenburg for Computer Gaming World praised the detail of Interstel's research into Norse mythology, but stated that "most players will probably find Dusk to be a very disappointing experience", with VGA graphics that "lack imagination", poor gameplay documentation, and "monotonous" text.
