= Dark Sun: Wake of the Ravager =

1994 video game

- Cover art by Gerald Brom
- Developer: Strategic Simulations
- Publishers: Strategic Simulations; Mindscape
- Producers: Nicholas Beliaeff; Daniel Cermak
- Designer: SSI Special Projects Team
- Programmer: Robert W. Calfee
- Series: Dark Sun
- Platform: MS-DOS
- Release: 1994
- Genre: Role-playing
- Mode: Single-player

Dark Sun: Wake of the Ravager is a role-playing video game developed and published by Strategic Simulations in 1994 for the MS-DOS operating system. It is the sequel to Dark Sun: Shattered Lands.

== Plot ==
Wake of the Ravager takes place in the Dungeons & Dragons' campaign setting of Dark Sun, set on a harsh desert world named Athas. The story is a continuation of the events in its predecessor, Dark Sun: Shattered Lands, and takes place in or around the city-state of Tyr. The introductory cut scene introduces the mysterious Dragon and his general, the Lord Warrior, who are planning the conquest of Tyr. Upon starting the game, the player witnesses an assassination of a woman who turns out to be a member of a secret society known as the Veiled Alliance. The player eventually becomes involved with the Veiled Alliance and their struggles against the Dragon and the Lord Warrior.

== Gameplay ==
Wake of the Ravager shares the same engine and gameplay as its predecessor, but with slightly different graphics (most obviously, the use of larger character sprites). The engine uses a top-down view of the world. Players control a party of one to four characters. The game can be started with a pregenerated party, or the player may create their own or import characters from Shattered Lands. As with other Dungeons & Dragons computer titles, combat features prominently in the game play; in the Dark Sun series, combat is turn-based. Like its predecessor, Ravager also incorporates elements unique to the Dark Sun campaign setting, including unique character races (the Mul and the insectoid thri-kreen (Though thri-kreen appear in both Pool of Radiance and Curse of the Azure Bonds)) and extensive use of psionics.

The game has several bugs, some of which result in a crash, others resulting in the game not winnable. For example, due to game engine limitations, graphics for doorways or items may disappear. Some of these issues were addressed in the 1.02 and 1.1 patches.

== Release ==
Wake of the Ravager was initially released in two boxed versions: on floppy disk and on CD-ROM, with the latter featuring digitised voice and music (as Red Book CD tracks). It was included in the 1996 compilation set, the AD&D Masterpiece Collection. The game was re-released in 2015 on GOG.com with support for Windows, macOS, and Linux.

== Reception ==
Reception

Review scores
Publication	Score
PC Gamer (UK)	60%
PC Gamer (US)	85%
Electronic Entertainment	3/5

Writing for PC Gamer US, Neil Randall called Wake of the Ravager "a rich and complex title that works from a highly usable interface — the kind of thing roleplayers are always looking for". Al Giovetti of Electronic Entertainment believed that the game "offers well-written, stylish role playing, once you get over some technical hurdles".

In Computer Gaming World, Scorpia wrote that Wake of the Ravager "is a mixed bag, although worth playing if you are a Dark Sun fan and you've waited for the patch or a revised release". PC Gamer UK's Andy Butcher called the game a "missed opportunity", but remarked that it was "still fun if you have the patience".

James V. Trunzo reviewed Dark Sun: Wake of the Ravager in White Wolf Inphobia #54 (April, 1995), rating it a 4 out of 5 and stated that "Wake of the Ravager is one of the few fantasy roleplaying games that uses a three-quarter overhead perspective and a multicharacter party while still allowing for independent character action. It's a pleasant change from the new-common 'through the eyes' perspective of other fantasy games. However, Wake of the Ravager still retains some of the outdated 'Dungeon Master and lead miniatures' feel that most of us were weaned on."

According to GameSpy, "Wake of the Ravager sported enhanced graphics and larger character sprites as well as a number of huge, game-stopping bugs which ensured that for most gamers, The Dragon's lackey still waits to be defeated".
