= Ravenloft: Strahd's Possession =

1994 video game

- Developer: DreamForge Intertainment
- Publishers: NA: Strategic Simulations; UK: US Gold
- Designers: Thomas J. Holmes; Christopher L. Straka
- Programmer: Don Wuenschell
- Composer: Jamie McMenamy
- Series: Ravenloft
- Platforms: MS-DOS; FM Towns; PC-98
- Release: 1994: MS-DOS; 1995: FM Towns, PC-98
- Genre: Role-playing game
- Mode: Single-player

Ravenloft: Strahd's Possession is a fantasy role-playing video game developed by DreamForge Intertainment and published by Strategic Simulations for MS-DOS in 1994. Versions for FM Towns and PC-98 were released in 1995. It was followed-up by Ravenloft: Stone Prophet.

== Plot ==
The game is based on the Ravenloft campaign setting for the Dungeons & Dragons fantasy role-playing game. The game is set in the domain of Barovia.

The player characters are servants of the Lord Dhelt, leader of the city-state of Elturel in the land of Faerûn of the Forgotten Realms setting. After a thief assaults the Lord and steals his patron god's Holy Symbol of Helm, the player characters are sent in pursuit of the thief. Instead of simply catching the thief, however, they are somehow transported to the mist-shrouded land of Barovia, ruled over by the vampire Count, Strahd von Zarovich.

As Barovia is surrounded by an impenetrable poison mist, the player characters have no choice but to explore the dark land of Barovia, which is crawling with undead and many more nasty things. Strahd, himself, seems interested in the characters' quest for the stolen amulet and invites the party to his castle. The characters' quest is to survive this hostile land long enough to unravel the mystery of the stolen amulet and somehow arrange safe passage out of Barovia.

== Gameplay ==
Enemies attacking

The game used 3D computer graphics and used a game engine identical to the later SSI title Menzoberranzan. Generally, the keyboard or mouse-driven directional arrows were used to move around or change perspective. As an early 3D game engine, it moved slowly and could appear cumbersome. However, there was an omnipresent map in the top corner which helped gamers from becoming too disoriented by the slow and cluttered progress of the game.

The fighting system involved using the mouse to pinpoint enemies and click to attack, at which point party members would take turns attacking. This unique combat system presented some logistical problems for gamers, and seemed to involve quite a learning curve.

A review in Game Bytes Magazine said: "Characters with weapons in hand will use them one by one [...] However, since the characters have a go one at a time from left to right, and they take a varying amount of time to ready their weapon again after using it, depending on their dexterity, one often finds that characters who are ready to use their weapons cannot do so because the computer is waiting for the character whose turn it is to ready and use his weapons before going to the next one. Hence, one may be anxiously clicking away but no one is using their weapons".

== Sound ==
Voice acting was used in some versions of the game and the Eastern European accent of the central characters did much to improve its believability. The acting was generally well received, but in the case of Strahd, Game Bytes magazine wrote that "the attempt to make him sound suave yet menacing (which is as it should be) didn't quite come off".

The music of Strahd's Possession was highly atmospheric and was critically acknowledged as a vast improvement of SSI's previous offerings. Game Bytes magazine said that "the music superbly brings out the mood and atmosphere, and is reminiscent of those found in gothic horror movies, with the organ being the central instrument".

== Publication history ==
This game was later included in the 1996 compilation set, the AD&D Masterpiece Collection. In October 2015, the game was re-released on GOG.com with support for Microsoft Windows, OS X, and Linux pre-packed with DOSBox, bundled with the sequel.

== Reception ==
Reception

Review scores
Publication	Score
PC Gamer (US)	82%
Electronic Entertainment	4/5
Computer Game Review	82%

In PC Gamer US, T. Liam McDonald wrote that Strahd's Possession was "one of SSI's best AD&D-based releases, packed with character, featuring just enough novelty, and being very nicely put together". Barry Brenesal of Electronic Entertainment called it "a strong step forward for SSI's epic role-playing fantasies", and found the game to be "cleverly designed, well-plotted, and atmospheric". Kevin Perry of Computer Game Review felt that Strahd's Possession failed to capture the Ravenloft campaign setting, and he described its interface as an exercise in "despair and frustration". He summarized that "some of [the game's] ideas will help usher along the next generation of CRPGs, but it doesn't". Conversely, the magazine's Ted Chapman called it "a decent enough game" and recommended it to fans of the genre. Computer Gaming World's Petra Schlunk approved of the game's "insidiously credible atmosphere". She disliked the real-time magic system, buggy enemy spawning and pathing, and erratic movement speed, and reported frequent crashes, but liked the graphics, sound, dialogue, and character creation system. Schlunk concluded that "aside from a few technical problems and a somewhat cumbersome interface, Ravenloft is a solid, thoughtfully designed and enjoyable game", not so long as to discourage a replay to finish it again more efficiently.

James V. Trunzo reviewed Ravenloft: Strahd's Possession in White Wolf #46 (Aug., 1994), giving it a final evaluation of "Very Good" and stated that "There's no denying that Ravenloft: Strahd's Possession is AD&D in a horror setting. But it's done well and is faithful to the trappings of Gothic horror. Considering the current state of computer adventure games, those factors are a huge plus."

Strahd's Possession was nominated for Computer Gaming World's Role-Playing Game of the Year award in May 1995. The editors remarked that the game's "subject matter and new 3-D look enhance the solid background universe created by TSR's AD&D team".

According to GameSpy, "Ravenloft: Strahd's Possession was a welcome return to form for SSI".
