= Dark Sun: Shattered Lands =

1993 video game

- Cover art by Gerald Brom
- Developer: Strategic Simulations
- Publisher: Strategic Simulations
- Producer: Bret Berry
- Programmer: Russell Brown
- Composer: Ralph Thomas
- Series: Dark Sun
- Platform: MS-DOS
- Release: April 1993
- Genre: Role-playing
- Mode: Single-player

Dark Sun: Shattered Lands is a turn-based role-playing video game that takes place in the Dungeons & Dragons campaign setting of Dark Sun. It was developed and published by Strategic Simulations in 1993. It received positive reviews although released initially in an unfinished state. The game had a sequel, Dark Sun: Wake of the Ravager, in 1994. An online MMORPG taking place in the same setting, Dark Sun Online: Crimson Sands, was released in 1996 and hosted on the Total Entertainment Network.

== Plot ==
Dark Sun: Shattered Lands takes place in the fictional land of Athas, a dying and hostile desert world. The locale is Draj, a city-state ruled by a powerful sorcerer-king. Nearby are several "free cities", surviving in the desert thanks to the hard work of their citizens. Upon the completion of the pyramid in Draj, the Sorcerer-King desires to make a great sacrifice of blood by sweeping the desert and destroying the inhabitants of the cities not under his control. The player controls a party of up to four gladiators, condemned to fight in Draj's arena until they die, so naturally the first order of business is escape. Upon escape, the party must unite the free cities to resist Draj's army.

== Gameplay ==
Shattered Lands does not use SSI's older Gold Box engine. Mechanically, it uses a variant of Advanced Dungeons & Dragons 2nd Edition rules. It presents the world in a top-down perspective similar to the Ultima series. Everything happens on the same screen; there is no separate map for combat, as in the Gold Box series. Players who see a group of hostile enemies on the map can stay outside of their detection range and land a preemptive strike, such as casting a damaging spell on them. Combat is turn-based and tactical.

Much of the game involves interaction with other characters, giving the Dark Sun series more emphasis on role-playing and less on dungeon crawling than in the Gold Box games. Shattered Lands adds an early implementation of branching dialogue trees. Quests could also be solved in multiple ways, including through dialogue instead of combat.

Characters are also far more powerful in Dark Sun than in ordinary Dungeons & Dragons campaign settings: base stats start higher, and members of one race, half-giants, receive double their hit die rolls. Shattered Lands also incorporates elements unique to the Dark Sun campaign setting, including unique character races (the Mul and the insectoid Thri-kreen) and extensive use of psionics.

== Release ==
Shattered Lands was released in a somewhat unfinished state in 1993, and later patched to a more workable version. It was available on both floppy disk and CD-ROM, though the CD-ROM contained no additional content and was merely used to install the game to the computer's hard drive. It was later re-released as part of the AD&D Masterpiece Collection in 1996. In addition, Data East was developing console ports for the Sega Saturn and Sony PlayStation for release in 1996, but they were cancelled. The game was re-released in 2015 on GOG.com with support for Windows, macOS, and Linux.

== Reception ==
=== Sales ===
Shattered Lands debuted at #17 on PC Data's computer games sales chart for the month of September 1993. It climbed to third place in October.

=== Critical reviews ===
Reception

Review scores
Publication	Score
Dragon	3/5
CD-ROM Today	4/5
Electronic Entertainment	8 out of 10

Writing for CD-ROM Today, T. Liam McDonald called Shattered Lands "a refreshing new twist on familiar AD&D games", and noted its "vastly improved interface" compared to SSI's previous products. Peter Olafson of Electronic Entertainment found Shattered Lands to be flawed, but he concluded that it was still "a very good game".

Scorpia of Computer Gaming World in 1993 assured readers that Dark Sun "is about as far from [the Gold Box series] as you can get ... SSI is taking their role-playing line in a new direction, which is good to see". While criticizing the "inanity" of the AD&D 2nd edition rules, and insufficient documentation, she concluded that "my impression of Dark Sun is favorable. SSI is moving to a more mature form of CRPG [with] much promise for the future, and promises a good game to play right now". The game was reviewed in 1994 in Dragon #205 by Sandy Petersen in the "Eye of the Monitor" column, who gave the game 3 out of 5 stars. John Terra of Computer Shopper mostly praised the game. He called the controls "instinctive" and "easy to master". He went on to compliment the audio and visuals, saying the graphics are "extremely detailed" and that the sound effects "stand out, with various combat noises that enhance the atmosphere during melee". He did have negative remarks about the map feature, noting that it does not automap and that it displays the positions of enemies, eliminating some of the suspense.

James V. Trunzo reviewed Dark Sun: Shattered Lands in White Wolf #40 (1994), giving it a final evaluation of "Very Good" and stated that "As AD&D adventures go, Dark Sun: Shattered Lands is one of the best. Does it break new ground? Yes, technologically - that's a big plus; no from a computer roleplaying angle. It's the same old present but in a different package (though there's no denying that the package is a pretty one). If you can appreciate Dark Sun for what it is and not for what you may have expected, you won't be disappointed. If you're looking for the ultimate roleplaying adventure, it ain't been made yet!"

Dark Sun was a runner-up for Computer Gaming World's Role-Playing Game of the Year award in June 1994, which ultimately went to Betrayal at Krondor. The editors wrote that Dark Sun "managed to capture the uniqueness of the magic system and 'scorched earth' look of Troy Denning's Prism Pentad series of novels".

According to GameSpy, "Dark Sun was TSR's "post-magical apocalypse" world of brutality, blood, and incredibly violent death. Dark Sun: Shattered Lands' graphics, on the other hand, were rather cutesy—not the violent, mature affair fans were hoping for".
