= Stormfront Studios =

Defunct American software company

Stormfront Studios, Inc.
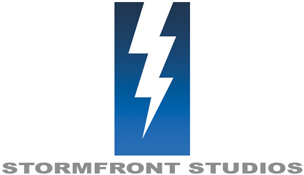
- Formerly: Beyond Software (1988–1993)
- Company type: Private
- Industry: Video games
- Founded: December 28, 1988; 37 years ago
- Founder: Don Daglow
- Defunct: March 31, 2008
- Fate: Dissolved
- Headquarters: San Rafael, California, U.S.
- Key people: Don Daglow (President & CEO)
- Number of employees: 33 (2008)

Stormfront Studios, Inc. was an American video game developer based in San Rafael, California. The studio was led by the pioneering developer Don Daglow. It was known for its work with RPGs in the late 1980s and early 1990s, including the first MMORPG with a graphical interface, Neverwinter Nights (1991). For the remainder of the 1990s it was primarily a sports studio, and launched games in many long running franchises including Tiger Woods PGA Tour. Switching to licensed titles in the early 2000s the studio had success with the critically acclaimed The Lord of the Rings: The Two Towers, but otherwise the group struggled financially with film adaptations and shut down in 2008.

The company received major awards and award nominations in its time, from The Academy of Interactive Arts & Sciences, G4 Television, BAFTA, The IGDA Game Developers Choice Awards, The EMMA Awards, SCEA, and the Software Publishers Association. In 2008, Neverwinter Nights was honored (along with EverQuest and World of Warcraft) at the 59th Annual Technology & Engineering Emmy Awards for advancing the art form of MMORPG games. In its final configuration in 2007, the company had over 50 developers working on two teams, and owned its proprietary engines, tools, and technology. The studio sold fourteen million copies of its games over its lifetime.

== History ==
=== Origins and RPG focus (1988-1993) ===
Stormfront was founded in 1988 as Beyond Software by Don Daglow, who had worked as a game programmer and then as Director of Game Development at Mattel Intellivision, as a producer at Electronic Arts, and as a production executive at Broderbund. Stormfront's management includes veterans of Disney, Electronic Arts, Ensemble Studios, LucasArts, Origin Systems, THX, Vivendi Universal and Warner Bros. The name would be changed in 1993 as the trademark for Beyond proved difficult to enforce.

Daglow had previously worked on game projects with Kathi McHugh and Steve Case of AOL (then called Quantum Computer Services). Stormfront's initial projects were a series of online titles for AOL, including the first fully automated play-by-email game, Quantum Space (1989). This led to the studio adopting the Dungeons & Dragons license to develop Neverwinter Nights in 1991. The title was the first graphical MMORPG and remained active until 1997. Neverwinter Nights held the all-time record as the top revenue-producing online RPG for almost ten years until the success of Ultima Online in the late 1990s. The studio also developed a number of single player Gold Box D&D titles, starting with Gateway to the Savage Frontier (1991). The D&D license was also used to develop the first RTS game to use a 3D perspective, Stronghold (1993).

=== Sports era (1993-2000) ===
The studio developed Tony La Russa's Ultimate Baseball in 1991, working closely with baseball manager Tony La Russa. The game was the most successful of SSI's works outside of D&D, and would change the company's direction for the decade. Some of the design principles SSI introduced, such as a circular marker beneath the player with possession of the ball, would become ubiquitous in the sports genre. From 1993, the studio would focus largely on sports titles, many of which were published by a then recently founded EA Sports. Daglow had previously designed or co-designed a number of baseball games, including the first ever adaptation of the sport Baseball (1971), as well as Intellivision World Series Baseball and Earl Weaver Baseball with Eddie Dombrower. The studio's relationship with EA Sports would prove profitable over the course of the decade, and SSI developed eleven games for the publisher. This included work on a number of long lived franchises, such as NASCAR Racing, John Madden Football, and Tiger Woods PGA Tour. The studio produced sports titles almost exclusively over the period, though sometimes they were published by other groups. ESPN National Hockey Night for example was published by Sony.

=== Licensed titles (2000-2008) ===
The studio worked on a variety of licenses during the 2000s. This included two final D&D games, Pool of Radiance: Ruins of Myth Drannor (2001) and Forgotten Realms: Demon Stone (2004). There were a few successful titles such as its adaptation of The Lord of the Rings: The Two Towers (2002), which won the group an Academy of Interactive Arts & Sciences Award for Outstanding Achievement in Visual Engineering. Their other movie adaptations in the period, including Eragon (2006) and The Spiderwick Chronicles (2008) were less successful. Stormfront closed on March 31, 2008 due to poor business performance.

== Games developed ==
Year	Title	Publisher	Platform(s)
1996	Andretti Racing	EA Sports	PC, PlayStation and Sega Saturn
1997	Andretti Racing '98	EA Sports	PC
2001	Blood Wake	Microsoft Game Studios	Xbox
1997	Byzantine: The Betrayal	Discovery Channel	PC
1994	Eagle Eye Mysteries in London	Creative Wonders (EA Kids)	PC and Mac
1993	Eagle Eye Mysteries	Creative Wonders (EA Kids)	PC and Mac
2006	Eragon	Vivendi Universal Games	Xbox 360, Xbox, PC and PS2
1994	ESPN Baseball Tonight	Sony	PC
1995	ESPN National Hockey Night	Sony	PC
2004	Forgotten Realms: Demon Stone	Atari	Xbox, PC and PS2
1991	Gateway to the Savage Frontier	SSI	PC, C64 and Amiga
1999	Hot Wheels Turbo Racing	EA	PlayStation and Nintendo 64
2001	Legend of Alon D'ar	UbiSoft	PS2
2000	Lego My Style: Kindergarten	Lego Media	PC and Mac
2000	Lego My Style: Preschool	Lego Media	PC and Mac
1996	Madden NFL '97	EA Sports	PC
1997	Madden NFL '98	EA Sports	PC
1994	Mario Andretti Racing	EA Sports	Sega Genesis
1997	NASCAR 98	EA Sports	PlayStation and Sega Saturn
1998	NASCAR 99	EA Sports	PlayStation and Nintendo 64
1999	NASCAR 2000	EA Sports	PC, PlayStation and Nintendo 64
1991	Neverwinter Nights	AOL, SSI	PC
1995	Old Time Baseball	Self-published	PC
2001	Pool of Radiance: Ruins of Myth Drannor	Ubisoft	PC
1993	Rebel Space	Prodigy	PC and Mac
1996	Star Trek: Deep Space Nine: Harbinger	Viacom New Media	PC and Mac
1998	Starfire Soccer Challenge	Purple Moon	PC and Mac
1993	Stronghold	SSI	PC
2002	The Lord of the Rings: The Two Towers	EA	PS2, Xbox, GBA
2008	The Spiderwick Chronicles	Sierra	Wii, Xbox 360 and PC
2000	Tiger Woods PGA Tour Golf 2001	EA Sports	PlayStation
1991	Tony La Russa Ultimate Baseball	SSI	PC
1993	Tony La Russa Ultimate Baseball	EA Sports	Sega Genesis
1994	Tony La Russa Baseball '95	EA Sports	Sega Genesis
1994	Tony La Russa Baseball II	SSI	PC
1995	Tony La Russa Baseball 3	Self-published	PC
1996	Tony La Russa Baseball 3: 1996 Edition	Self-published	PC
1997	Tony La Russa Baseball 4	Maxis	PC
1992	Treasures of the Savage Frontier	SSI	PC and Amiga
1989	Quantum Space	AOL	PC, Mac, Apple II and C64
1988	The QuantumLink Serial	AOL	PC, Mac, Apple II and C64
