= Intellivision World Series Baseball =

1983 video game

- Developer: Mattel Electronics
- Publisher: Mattel Electronics
- Designers: Don Daglow (uncredited); Eddie Dombrower
- Programmer: Eddie Dombrower
- Composer: David Warhol
- Platform: Intellivision
- Release: NA: Late 1983
- Genre: Sports
- Modes: Single-player, multiplayer

Intellivision World Series Major League Baseball is a baseball video game (1983) designed by Don Daglow and Eddie Dombrower, and published by Mattel for the Intellivision Entertainment Computer System. IWSB was one of the first sports video games to use multiple camera angles and present a three-dimensional (as opposed to two-dimensional) perspective. It was also the first statistics-based baseball simulation game on a video game console; all prior console baseball games were arcade-style recreations of the sport.

The game's full formal title (due to licensing requirements) was Intellivision World Series Major League Baseball. It was typically shortened to World Series Baseball in use to differentiate it from the prior Mattel baseball game.

== Gameplay ==
Intellivision World Series Baseball incorporates multiple camera angles, in a manner resembling a sports television broadcast.

Intellivision World Series Baseball displayed the batter and pitcher from a "center field camera" view. One player chose the pitch type, while the player batting chose when to swing when to take a pitch, and whether or not to bunt.

Once the ball was hit, the game switched to a "press box camera" view, where the defensive player could control the fielders and the batting player controlled the baserunners.

When runners were on base an inset window displayed them, and the batting player could lengthen or shorten their lead and attempt to steal.

The game was originally written with a simplified version of Daglow's 1971 mainframe baseball statistical simulation program, so that the MLBPA license could be acquired by Mattel and the game would accurately simulate the play of real Major League Baseball players. For economic reasons in mid-1983, Mattel withdrew from this plan at the last minute, and the designers were forced to replace actual players with the names of the Blue Sky Rangers Intellivision game design team.

Intellivision World Series Baseball is also notable for the following innovations:

- In-game play by play announcers, presented via Intellivoice
- Stadium background music, created by Dave Warhol (who also worked on Earl Weaver Baseball at EA)
- Save/load in a baseball game (through a RAM chip on the cartridge)
- Lineups based on real player stats and skin colour (although names were changed)

== History ==
=== 1980-1981 ===
In the early 1980s, video games were based on models established either by coin-op games' scrolling playfields, or board games' static background images. The screen was either a stable field on which characters moved or a top-down (sometimes angled) display that scrolled horizontally, vertically or both ways across a larger virtual image. These restrictions were created by the limited memory size of early video game consoles, where a single screen would use up much of the RAM storage space available in a machine, and small video game cartridges that held only 4K (later 8K or 16K) of ROM memory.

Daglow was one of the original five in-house Intellivision programmers at Mattel in 1980, and had written the first known computer baseball game, Baseball on a PDP-10 mainframe computer at Pomona College in 1971. After completing his first Intellivision cartridge Utopia in 1981, he was promoted to lead the Intellivision game development team at Mattel.

=== 1982 ===
While watching a baseball game on TV in the spring of 1982, Daglow realized that the Intellivision could mimic the same camera angles shown in the broadcast. He immediately wrote a proposal for a new baseball game. He received approval from group Vice President Gabriel Baum to start work. No current programmers were free, so Daglow began a search for someone qualified to create this new kind of game.

He found the right person through the job placement office of his alma mater, Pomona College. Eddie Dombrower was a programmer, animator and classically trained dancer who had invented the DOM dance notation system on the Apple II computer as a way for choreographers to record dance moves the same way composers write down music. Since Intellivision World Series Baseball would require far better animations than past video games for its TV-style display, Dombrower was considered to be a perfect fit for the job.

By October 1982 Dombrower had a first screen display running, complete with another first: an inset screen to show a runner taking his lead off of first base. This was the first use of an inset or picture-in-picture display in a video game.

=== 1983 ===
Baum and Daglow showed the prototype to Mattel's marketing department, which was locked in a TV advertising war with arch-rival Atari for the position of top video game console. Although the game was not slated for completion until mid-1983, the company rushed a new TV commercial into production for Christmas, in which Intellivision spokesman George Plimpton pulled a velvet drape from a monitor and proclaimed the title to be "the future of video games." Mattel's marketing strategy was to dissuade consumers from buying Atari or Coleco consoles by showing an exclusive new style of Mattel game.

While the game had been announced by Plimpton in Christmas 1982, Danny Goodman of Radio-Electronics reported n June 1983 that the game was not ready for release yet. The video game crash of 1983 wiped out most of the market before Intellivision World Series Baseball ever shipped. Like most video games completed after the spring of 1983, it entered a toy store network that believed the video game era was over and that the games had been a passing fad.

To make matters worse, while the game could be played without the use of the Intellivoice voice synthesizer (which was already being phased out due to poorer-than-expected sales and declining user interest), it did require the then-new Intellivision Entertainment Computer System (ECS) keyboard component. Unfortunately, by the time the ECS was released, an internal shake-up at the top levels of management had shifted the company's focus away from hardware add-ons and almost exclusively towards software. As a result, the ECS was not well-promoted, and neither it nor its companion software titles sold particularly well... and since IWSB was one of the last titles made for the ECS system, very few copies were sold, making it one of the rarest Intellivision titles in the collectors' market.

Daglow and Dombrower went on to create the hit Earl Weaver Baseball game at Electronic Arts in 1987, where they more fully implemented the ideas behind Intellivision World Series Baseball. This set the stage for the EA Sports product line. In the early and mid-1990s, Daglow led the development of the Tony La Russa Baseball games, further refining baseball simulations.

== See also ==
- Baseball mainframe computer game
- Champion Baseball
- Earl Weaver Baseball
- Tony La Russa Baseball
- Old Time Baseball
