= Terry Shannon (writer) =

American journalist (1952–2005)

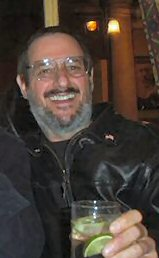
Terry Shannon

Terry Craig Shannon (August 16, 1952 – May 26, 2005) was an American information technology consultant, journalist and author. For over 30 years, he was involved in implementing PDP, VAX, and Alpha computers with their respective operating systems RSX, VAX/VMS, OpenVMS and Windows NT. He was a respected journalist and analyst, paying particular attention to Compaq and Hewlett-Packard after the merger of Digital Equipment Corporation and the high-performance computing (HPC) space, writing a series of newsletters.

He has been credited with assigning Intel Corporation the nickname "Chipzilla".

Terry Shannon participated and was a keynote speaker at DECUS (the Digital Equipment Corporation Users Society), the international users group of Digital Equipment Corporation (DEC), later known as Connect, and currently HP-Interex. He also spoke as an authority at other IT and HPC conferences, and was quoted by other authors as an authority on the subject.

== Early life ==
Terry Craig Shannon was born in Syracuse, New York, United States. At the age of 17 he dropped out of high school and enlisted in the U.S. Army in 1969.

He served as a spook in Vietnam at a Radio Reconnaissance Field Station (i.e., the 330th RRFS) with the 509th Radio Research Group of the Army Security Agency (ASA), a branch of the National Security Agency (see NSA and/or SIGINT for explanation). During his two years (1970–1972) of Vietnam War service, Shannon was a computer communications and traffic analysis specialist. Using his training in cryptography and signal-intelligence, his job was to triangulate North Vietnamese radio signals, request an airstrike, and then return to the original frequency and listen for the enemy channel to "go off the air."

== Writing career ==
In May 1983, Shannon became self-employed as a writer. He published his first brief article in the May 1983 issue of DEC Professional. About two years later, in September 1985, Shannon began working as a contributor for Digital Review. During his tenure with Digital Review, Shannon began using the pseudonym "Charlie Matco".

Shannon also wrote under the pseudonyms "Digital Dog" and "the notorious Belgian hacker Cedric Zool." "Charlie Matco" was another of his pseudonyms. Under the "Charlie Matco" byline, Shannon wrote about IT industry trends, product releases, and major business transactions in the "Rumor Roundup" feature at the end of each issue of Digital Review magazine. He obtained information from friends and colleagues in the IT industry.

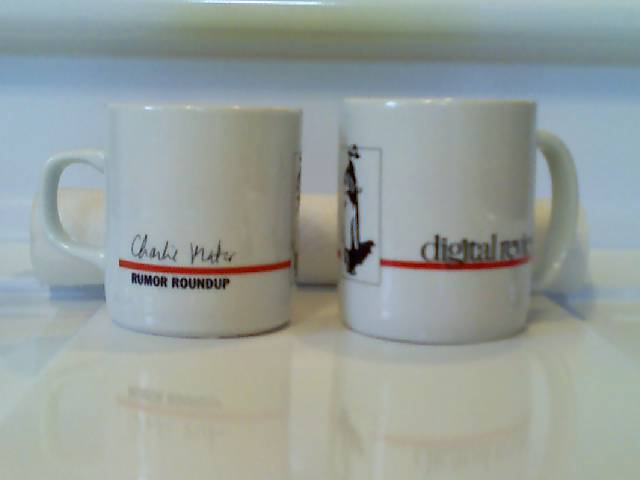
Charlie Matco coffee mugs

"Charlie Matco" was usually depicted as a cartoonish, "private eye" sort of figure, after the fashion of Nick Danger, but without any facial features (i.e., just a fedora, a trenchcoat, and a cigarette in one hand). That logo, which appeared next to the "Charlie Matco" byline on every "Rumor Roundup" article, was also depicted on the coffee mug, which Shannon would send to anyone who (intentionally or otherwise) provided useful information. According to Jeffrey Steinberg, former Technical Editor of Digital Review, the signature on the mug was in the handwriting of Deborah McDonald, the publication's managing editor at the time. In fact, a "Charlie Matco" mug now lives in the Computer History Museum.

Over the next two decades, Shannon wrote about trends in the IT industry. An advocate of the VMS operating system, he wrote the first version of the VMS user guide, Introduction to VAX/VMS through Professional Press in May 1985 (ISBN 096147291X). This ran for five editions. According to those associated with its original publisher, Professional Press, the first edition of the book sold more than 100,000 copies. The latest (5th) edition was called Introduction to OpenVMS (ISBN 1878956612). It is required reading for some Computer Science college courses.

Shannon began to publish a series of newsletters in 1994, Shannon Knows DEC, which became Shannon Knows Compaq, after the firm's acquisition in 1998, and eventually Shannon Knows HPC after the HP takeover in 2002. His insider knowledge constantly frustrated those he wrote about, and HP pursued a love/hate relationship, occasionally citing him in press releases. The newsletter ran until his death in 2005.

== Analysis and citations ==
As a well-known expert in the field, Shannon was also widely quoted in the independent trade press, such as in The Register as well as in Computerworld, TechWeb, ITNews, and Cnet.

Shannon played an important role in the publishing industry competition between Ziff-Davis and International Data Group, the two largest technology publishing firms of the 1980s. During his tenure at Ziff's Digital Review semi-monthly, Shannon reported on unannounced products from DEC and other companies. This provided important content for Digital Review in its competitive battle with Digital News, a competition that reflected the larger rivalry between the publications' parent companies.

Shannon's reporting on the minicomputer industry included extensive analysis of the inroads made by the IBM AS/400 line of minicomputers against Digital's VAX line. The competition among minicomputer vendors would prove to be a turning point in Shannon's career, as eventual mergers led to his DEC newsletter shifting its focus to Compaq (later, HP-Compaq).

During the early 1990s, much of Shannon's focus was on DEC's development of the Alpha chip, a processor intended to replace the aging VAX CPU line. As DEC prepared the Alpha chip for release, Shannon was widely used as a source of advance information on the new processor.

Shannon also reported extensively on Digital executives and their comings and goings within the company. Shannon analyzed the controversial departure of Robert Glorioso from DEC in terms of the struggle for control of the company as it began to flounder in the 1990s.

== User groups ==
Shannon was active in HPC user groups and the DEC community, including DECUS and Encompass. He served on the Encompass Board of Directors. He gave frequent lectures and seminars, including the 2005 Keynote address.
