= The Lord of the Rings: The Two Towers (video game) =

2002 video game

- Developers: Stormfront Studios; Hypnos Entertainment (GC)
- Publisher: Electronic Arts (Note: Released under the EA Games brand.)
- Director: Hudson Piehl
- Producers: Scott Evans; Jeanne Young
- Designers: J. Epps; Christopher Tremmel
- Programmer: Steve W. Kojder
- Artists: Raymond Monday; Margaret Foley-Mauvais; Tetsuo Kadonaga
- Writers: Michael Becker; Jerry Darcy
- Composer: Howard Shore
- Platforms: PlayStation 2; Game Boy Advance; GameCube; Xbox; Mobile
- Release: October 22, 2002: PlayStation 2; NA: October 22, 2002; EU: November 8, 2002 Game Boy Advance; EU: November 8, 2002; NA: November 12, 2002 GameCube, Xbox; NA: December 30, 2002; EU: March 14, 2003 Mobile; NA: May 1, 2003
- Genre: Hack and slash
- Modes: Single-player, multiplayer (Note: Only on GBA version)

The Lord of the Rings: The Two Towers is a 2002 hack and slash game developed by Stormfront Studios for the PlayStation 2 and Xbox. A 2D Game Boy Advance game of the same name was made by Griptonite Games, a port to the GameCube by Hypnos Entertainment, and to mobile by JAMDAT. A version for Microsoft Windows developed by Ritual Entertainment was cancelled during development. The game was published on all platforms by Electronic Arts. It is an adaption of the 2002 film of the same name. Originally released in North America for the PlayStation 2 in October 2002, it was released in November 2002 for the Game Boy Advance, in December 2002 for the Xbox and GameCube, and in May 2003 for mobile.

The game is an adaptation of Peter Jackson's 2001 film The Lord of the Rings: The Fellowship of the Ring and his 2002 film The Lord of the Rings: The Two Towers, which was released shortly after the game. As it is not an adaptation of J. R. R. Tolkien's The Two Towers, the second volume in his Lord of the Rings novel, anything from the novel not specifically mentioned or depicted in the films could not be represented in the game. This is because, at the time, Vivendi Universal Games, in partnership with Tolkien Enterprises, held the rights to the video game adaptations of Tolkien's literary works, whilst Electronic Arts held the rights to the video game adaptations of the New Line Cinema films. EA chose not to publish a game based on Jackson's The Fellowship of the Ring film, instead incorporating some of the plot and footage into their The Two Towers game, which was released a few weeks after Vivendi's The Fellowship of the Ring game, a licensed adaptation of Tolkien's novel The Fellowship of the Ring.

The Two Towers received a generally positive response, with critics praising the re-creation of sets and scenes from the films, and the epic scope of some of the battles. Some, however, criticized the game for being too short and the combat overly repetitive. The game was a financial success, selling almost four million units, and outselling Vivendi's The Fellowship of the Ring game, which sold just over one million. In November 2003, EA released a sequel based upon the third film, The Lord of the Rings: The Return of the King.

== Gameplay ==
The Two Towers is a hack and slash action game played from a third-person perspective. The game features levels taken either directly from scenes in The Fellowship of the Ring and The Two Towers films, or based closely on elements from the films. For example, the levels during the defense of Helm's Deep are very similar to the corresponding scenes in the film, but a level in Fangorn Forest in which the player fights orcs, Uruk-hai and trolls is original to the game. For most of the game, the player is free to play as Aragorn, Gimli or Legolas. In the game's main opening level, however, set at Weathertop, only Aragorn is playable. Isildur is also a playable character in a tutorial level set during the Battle of the Last Alliance. All subsequent levels can be played with any of the three characters. Often, the two characters not chosen as the player character will appear as supporting NPCs. Upon completing the game with all three characters, the player can play through every level with Isildur. In the Game Boy Advance version, which is played from an isometric three-quarter top-down view, the playable characters are Aragorn, Legolas, Gandalf, Frodo and Éowyn, with Gimli available as an unlockable character once the player has completed the game with two other characters.

Although all three characters have different weapons and combos, their basic fighting style is the same. Each character has a quick attack that does minimal damage and can be blocked, as well as a fierce attack, which does more damage but is slower and leaves the player vulnerable to attack. Only fierce attacks can break enemy shields. Each character also has a ranged attack, a "killing move" (which can be used to instantly kill downed enemies), a parry (which can deflect enemy attacks), a knock back (which pushes nearby enemies away), a jump back (in which the player character jumps back away from the enemy) and a devastating attack (a charged fierce attack). Combos are an important part of combat, with each character having access to a unique list of combos, which are achieved by stringing specific button presses together. Additionally, each character is more skilled at a particular type of combat; Aragorn is the best melee fighter, Legolas is better at ranged combat, and Gimli is a balanced character with nice melee and ranged attacks.

Aragorn fights the Nazgûl at Weathertop in the PlayStation 2 version of the game; the illuminated meter on the bottom left indicates he is currently in "Perfect mode."

Combos, as well as health increases, and stronger ranged and devastating attacks must be purchased between levels in the skill upgrades screen. During each level, the player will be continually graded on the skill with which they dispatch enemies; "Fair", "Good", "Excellent" and "Perfect." The more skill with which the player kills, the more experience they acquire. The player's skill is measured by an on-screen meter which increases as the player dispatches enemies. To avoid the meter dropping back down, the player must avoid being hit, and must kill enemies using a variety of different methods. When a player reaches a Perfect level, all of their attacks increase in strength, and the experience from each kill is doubled. However, Perfect status only lasts for a brief period of time. At the end of each level, the player is then given an overall rating based on their performance, and awarded the corresponding number of upgrade points to spend on new combos and stronger attacks. The better the player has performed during the level, the more upgrade points that will be made available. Certain upgrades only become available for purchase once a player has reached a specific experience level.

The Game Boy Advance version of the game is markedly different, being more similar to the Diablo series, with a focus on skills and loot-based gear. Rather than solely playing as the trio of Aragorn, Legolas, and Gimli, this version of the game features additional, bespoke, campaigns for Frodo, Gandalf and Éowyn, each with their own stages and skill sets. Much like the console version of the game, the game additionally adapts moments from Fellowship of the Ring. Each character has fifteen active and passive skills that can be unlocked and upgraded as the player gains experience. One of the active skills, for example, is "Summon"; Gandalf summons a Great Eagle, Aragorn summons either Legolas or Gimli; Legolas summons Gimli; Frodo summons Sam, and Éowyn summons Éomer. Passive skills include the ability for Aragorn to wield two swords at once, to hit enemies with his shield, and to throw his sword at nearby foes. Every time the player increases in level, they can attribute points to strength, accuracy, health, defense, and courage. Additionally, Frodo has the ability to use the One Ring to turn invisible, but he can only do so for a certain amount of time before attracting the attention of Sauron. The game also features co-op multiplayer through the Game Boy link function.

== Synopsis ==
=== Background ===
The game is presented against the background of the history of the One Ring. At the dawn of the Second Age, after the defeat of the Dark Lord, Morgoth, the elves forged the Rings of Power to help themselves. However, the elves were unaware that Sauron, Morgoth's closest ally, had survived his master's defeat, and had been the one who taught the Elven-smiths, led by Celebrimbor, how to forge the Rings, whilst, in secret, he forged his own One Ring in the fires of Mount Doom, a Ring far more powerful than any of the others. However, in order for the One Ring to be powerful enough to control the other Rings, Sauron had to transfer most of his power into it. As soon as he put it on, the elves became aware of his ruse, removing and hiding their Three Rings, which Celebrimbor had forged without Sauron's aid. Sauron waged war on the elves, conquering much of Middle-earth and killing Celebrimbor. Thus began the Dark Years, when Sauron took possession of the remaining sixteen Rings, giving seven to the dwarves and nine to men in an effort to corrupt them. The dwarves proved relatively immune to the powers of the Rings, acquiring only a greed for gold, and becoming unconcerned with events in the wider world. Men proved less resilient, and the nine kings given the Rings were murdered by the nine Ring-wraiths, or Nazgûl, led by the Witch-king of Angmar.

In his ongoing efforts to conquer Middle-earth, Sauron regained the allegiance of many of Morgoth's servants from the First Age, and successfully corrupted Númenor. However, in doing so, he expended a great deal of his power, and lost the ability to ever again assume a pleasing disguise. Returning to Mordor, he regained his strength, eventually capturing Minas Ithil. However, realizing that if they did not join together, Sauron would destroy both men and elves, Elendil, High-King of Arnor, and Gil-galad, High-King of Noldor, formed the Last Alliance of Men and Elves, and attacked Sauron in his fortress, Barad-dûr. The alliance was victorious, with Isildur cutting the One Ring from Sauron's hand. However, although presented with a chance to destroy the Ring forever, Isildur, already beginning to succumb to its corruption, chose not to do so. As such, although Sauron's physical form was vanquished, his spirit, bound to the Ring, survived. Some time later, Isildur was attacked and killed by a band of orcs, and the Ring was lost in the river Anduin for over two thousand years.

Meanwhile, during the Third Age, a still weakened Sauron covertly established a stronghold at Dol Guldur. Unsure of the origin of the evil power in Dol Guldur, the wizard Gandalf was sent to investigate. However, Sauron hid from Gandalf, waiting for four hundred years before returning. Around the same time, the One Ring was found by a Hobbit named Sméagol, who became utterly corrupted by it, living in the caves in the barrow-downs, and physically transforming into a creature known as Gollum. For five hundred years, Gollum was consumed and corrupted by the Ring. Eventually, Gandalf was able to determine the evil presence in Dol Guldur was indeed Sauron. Gandalf reported back to the White Council, but Saruman dissuaded them from moving against Sauron. Only when he learned the One Ring may be in the vicinity of the Gladden Fields did Saruman agree to attack Sauron, hoping to find the Ring himself. The Council drove Sauron from Dol Guldur, unaware that he knew the Ring had been found. Just prior to Sauron's departure, the Ring passed to another hobbit, Bilbo Baggins, who used it to assist in the victory of elves, men and dwarves at the Battle of the Five Armies. Sixty years later, Gollum was captured by Uruk-hai, and taken to Mordor, where he was tortured into revealing the owner and location of the Ring; Bilbo Baggins of the Shire. In the meantime, Bilbo had left the Shire to live in Rivendell, and upon the advice of Gandalf had (very reluctantly) given the Ring to his nephew, Frodo Baggins. With the information given him by Gollum, Sauron, still unable to take physical form, thus sent the Nazgûl to the Shire to retrieve the One Ring. Frodo, and his friends, Samwise Gamgee, Peregrin "Pippin" Took and Meriadoc "Merry" Brandybuck managed to escape the Shire and make it to Bree, where they encountered the ranger Aragorn, the last surviving descendant of Isildur, and rightful heir to the throne of Gondor. Aragorn vowed to protect the hobbits on their journey to Rivendell.

=== Plot ===
After a tutorial level in which the player controls Isildur during the Battle of the Last Alliance, the game begins with Aragorn, the protagonist of the game, (voiced by Viggo Mortensen) stating "I am Isildur's heir. Not Isildur himself. My fate is my own." He then rides to Helm's Deep where he awaits the attack of Saruman's army of orcs and Uruk-hai. Atop the battlements he tells Éowyn (Carole Ruggier) of his encounters with the enemy prior to his arrival. Shortly after he first met the hobbits, the group stay at Weathertop for the night, but are attacked by the Nazgûl. Aragorn successfully drives them off but not before Frodo (Elijah Wood) is stabbed by the Witch-king with a Morgul-blade. The party reach Rivendell, where Frodo is healed. The Council of Elrond then form a fellowship of nine to bring the Ring to Mordor to destroy it; Frodo (who will carry the Ring), Sam, Merry, Pippin, Gandalf, Aragorn, Boromir, Legolas and Gimli.

Attempting to cross the mountain Caradhras, a snowstorm causes an avalanche, closing the pass. The party reluctantly decide the only way past the Misty Mountains is to go under them, via the goblin mines of Moria. They arrive at the Doors of Durin, but are attacked by the Watcher. After slaying the creature, they continue into Moria. Inside, Gimli (John Rhys-Davies) is horrified to learn that his cousin Balin is dead. In the Chamber of Mazarbul, the Fellowship finds Balin's tomb and a record of how the dwarves lost the mine to the goblins. The fellowship is then attacked by a hoard of goblins and a cave troll. The party manage to fight off their attackers and get to the exit, but on their way across the Bridge of Khazad-dûm they are confronted by a Balrog, and Gandalf (Ian McKellen) sacrifices himself to allow the others to escape.

Soon thereafter, they reach Amon Hen, and the fellowship fragments. Aragorn allows Frodo to leave with the Ring and make his own way to Mordor. As they are ambushed by a group of Uruk-hai, Aragorn, Gimli and Legolas (Orlando Bloom) protect Frodo, giving him time to escape with Sam. Meanwhile, Boromir is left alone to protect Merry and Pippin. He is overwhelmed by the numbers, and is fatally wounded by the Uruk-hai leader, Lurtz. Merry and Pippin are then taken captive by the Uruk-hai. Before Boromir, dies, Aragorn, Legolas, and Gimli reach him and vow to avenge his death. They kill Lurtz and set out in pursuit of Merry and Pippin. This brings them to Fangorn Forest, where they encounter a wizard. Initially believing it to be Saruman, they soon realize it is Gandalf, who has been resurrected by the Valar. Merry and Pippin are also safe, having escaped their captors and come under the protection of the ent Treebeard.

Meanwhile, Gandalf explains there is now an alliance between the two towers of Barad-dûr in Mordor and Orthanc in Isengard, home of Saruman, who has sent out legions of Uruk-hai and orcs to ravage the countryside of Rohan, whose king, Théoden, has been rendered virtually comatose by Saruman's magic. Gandalf, Aragorn, Legolas and Gimli race to Edoras, where Gandalf frees Théoden from Saruman's spell, and it is decided that the inhabitants of Rohan shall make for Helm's Deep, a fortress which has never been breached. Gandalf leaves to get additional help, promising to return "at the turn of the tide." Meanwhile, on the path to Helm's Deep, the travelers are attacked by orcs riding Warg, but Aragorn, Legolas and Gimli are able to fight them off.

The game then returns to the opening, with Aragorn and Éowyn on the battlements. The women and children are taken into the caves, as Saruman's army arrives, and the Battle of the Hornburg begins. Initially, the defenders are able to hold off the attackers, but the Uruk-hai blast a hole in the outer wall using explosives, through which hundreds of Uruk-hai and orcs flood. After the women and children retreat deeper inside, the defenders move to the courtyard to attempt to defend the door to the Great Hall. After a lengthy battle, the sheer numbers of attackers prove too much, and everyone retreats inside. Arargorn, Legolas, Gimli, Théoden and the remainder of the Rohan warriors prepare to make a suicide charge out of the Hall, but as they do, Gandalf arrives with a vast army of Rohirrim, attacking the Uruk-hai and orcs from behind whilst the others attack from the front. Saruman's army is decimated.

After the battle, Gandalf warns Aragorn that this is only the beginning of hostilities. However, he points out that Sauron fears Aragorn, as he knows of Aragorn's bloodline, and that he can inspire the men of Gondor. He also says the forces of good have one major advantage over Sauron; the Ring is hidden, and that they should attempt to destroy it has not entered Sauron's mind. He expects them to use it as a weapon, never imagining it is being brought closer to him every day.

== Development ==
"Probably the most intimidating aspect of embarking on this project was the sense that we had this incredible responsibility to deliver in an interactive format in the same way Peter Jackson had delivered in film. He has taken some of the most beloved literary works of all time and translated them into an epic film masterpiece that has created millions and millions of fans worldwide."

— Scott Evans; producer

Development of the game that ultimately became The Two Towers began in February 2000, at which time Electronic Arts were tentatively planning to publish a game based on, and coinciding with the release of the 2001 film The Fellowship of the Ring. New Line Cinema sent EA a copy of the script for Fellowship, as well as storyboards, concept art, and some very early trailers. In June 2001, by which time it had become apparent that a game based on The Fellowship was not going to happen, members of Stormfront Studios and EA Redwood Shores traveled to New Zealand to spend a week on the set, concentrating on the work being done for the 2002 film The Two Towers. Whilst in New Zealand, they also visited Weta Workshop, which were handling all of the special effects and props for the films. Several more visits to both the sets and Weta followed, and as late as July 2002, Stormfront remained in regular contact with the production team to ensure the game matched the finished film as closely as possible.

In an October 2002 interview with IGN, producer Scott Evans addressed why the development team had decided to make an action game, as opposed to a role-playing game, arguing,

our core design goal was to immerse players in the world of Middle-earth and allow them to relive the most memorable moments of The Lord of the Rings films. We knew early on that the best way to deliver that to players was to center the game on an action experience.

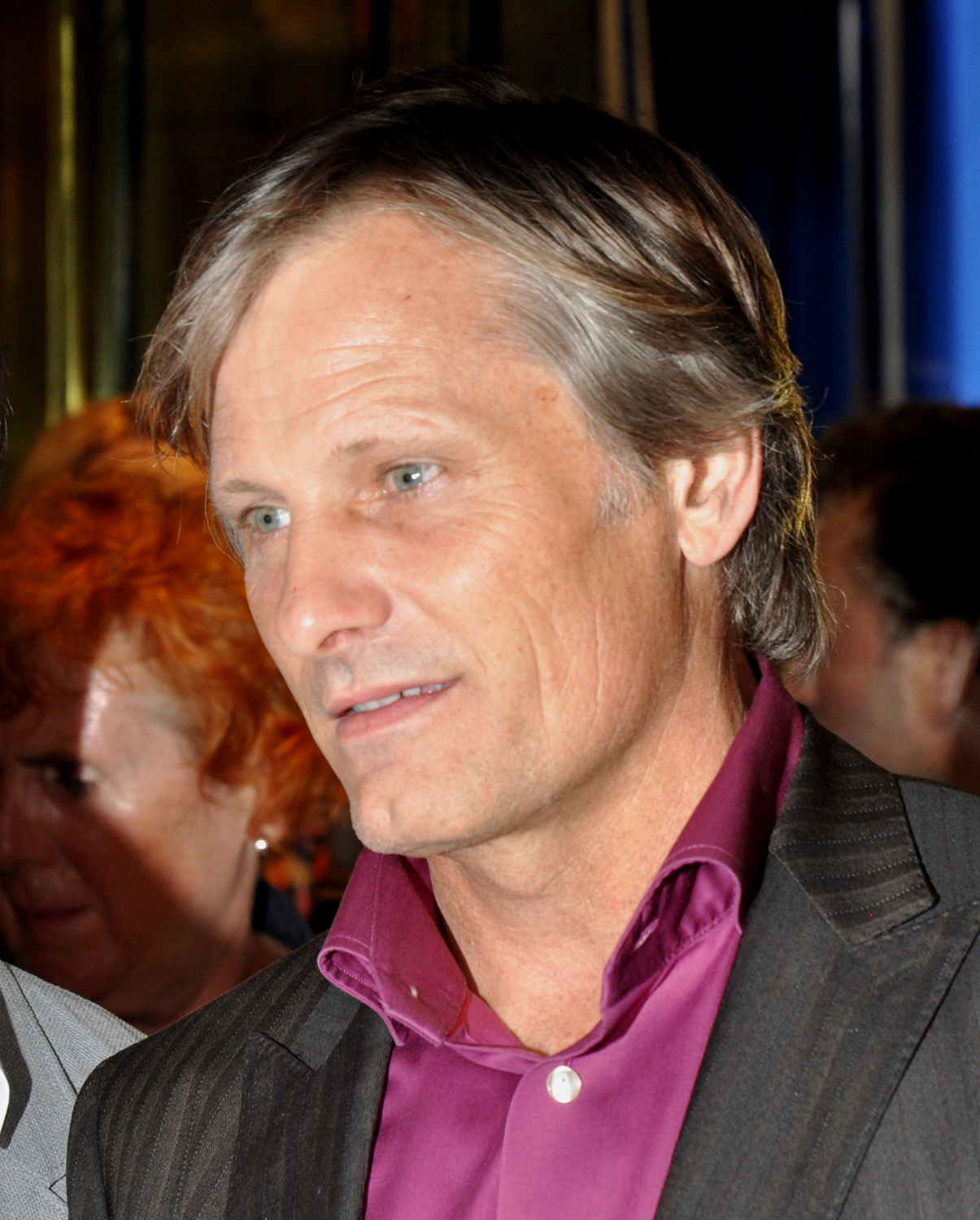
Viggo Mortensen reprises the role of Aragorn in the game. As well as providing the voice, Mortensen also recreated some of the sword-fighting moves from the film, allowing the development team to recreate the exact movements in the game.

Evans also explained that from the earliest stages of development, the team had access to rough cuts of the film, digital models and textures from the visual effects department, motion capture data, sound effects, soundtrack material, still photography from the set, Alan Lee and John Howe's pre-production concept art, and material from the props department. In the case of animating the character of Aragorn, the developers even had Viggo Mortensen and the swordmaster, Bob Anderson, came into the studio and perform some of the sword fighting techniques from the film, enabling the development team to recreate the physicality of the character exactly, frame by frame.

The game was officially announced on February 19, 2002, when EA revealed that although it would be multi-platform, it was initially being developed by Stormfront Studios for the PlayStation 2. They revealed that players would be able to control Aragorn, Legolas and Gimli in full 3D environments taken directly from the films. On May 16, EA announced a Game Boy Advance version, developed by Griptonite Games, in which players could control Frodo, Aragorn, Legolas, Gandalf and Éowyn. This version would also feature co-op multiplayer through the Game Link Cable. Also on May 16, Ritual Entertainment advertised for staff to work on an unspecified Lord of the Rings game for Windows, to be published by EA. This was presumed to be a port of the PlayStation 2 version. At the E3 event in May 2002, EA made available a brief playable demo of the PlayStation 2 version, featuring gameplay from the final Helm's Deep level, with Aragorn as the playable character. A non-playable demo of the Game Boy Advance version was also made available.

"Peter Jackson's films have forever imprinted upon us how Tolkien's world should look, feel and sound. Our core design goal was to immerse the player into this world. We therefore wanted to blur the line between where the film ends and the game world begins. The cutscenes provided us a great vehicle to deliver that sense. We deployed a dedicated cinematic team at both Electronic Arts and Stormfront who spent an enormous amount of time massaging the elements of camera, special effects, animations and audio into seamless transitions from film to interactive gameplay and back again."

— Scott Evans; producer

In June, EA revealed Stormfront had ninety people working on the game, and confirmed the game would feature levels from both The Fellowship of the Ring and The Two Towers, as well as both the voice acting and physical likenesses of the actors from the films. Additionally, everything from entire sets and locations to individual weapons and props were being recreated in the game, which was running on a modified version of the Legend of Alon D'ar game engine, with additional technology provided by EA Redwood Shores. EA also explained they had full copyright clearance to use the films' score and sound effects.

On July 24, EA announced the game would also be released for GameCube. Although it was being developed by Hypnos Entertainment rather than Stormfront, it would be a direct port of the PlayStation 2 version. On August 5, EA cancelled the Windows version when it became apparent that Ritual Entertainment would not be able to have it ready on time.

In September, EA revealed more information about the PlayStation 2 version, including a full list of levels. They also explained the game would feature a series of unlockable "DVD style extras," including exclusive interviews with Peter Jackson, Barrie Osborne, Viggo Mortensen, Orlando Bloom and John Rhys-Davies, which wouldn't be available anywhere else, and which would focus on the making of the game. In total, including footage from the film edited into the game, there would be about forty minutes of FMV content.

On October 4, shortly before the release of the PlayStation 2 version of the game, EA announced they would be making a sequel, to be released in roughly twelve months time, which would be closely based on Peter Jackson's as yet incomplete 2003 film The Lord of the Rings: The Return of the King. They also stated they had begun preliminary work on an as yet untitled RPG game based on all three films, slated for release in 2004 (this game would ultimately become The Lord of the Rings: The Third Age). On October 21, the same day the PlayStation 2 version was released in North America, EA announced the game would also be coming to Xbox, set for release around the same time as the GameCube port. As with the GameCube version, the Xbox version would be a direct port of the PlayStation 2 version.

== Reception ==
Reception

Aggregate score
Aggregator	Score			
Aggregator	GBA	GameCube	PS2	Xbox
Metacritic	78/100	82/100	82/100	79/100

Review scores
Publication	Score			
Publication	GBA	GameCube	PS2	Xbox
Electronic Gaming Monthly	7.5/10		8/10, 8.5/10, 8/10	
Eurogamer			7/10	
Game Informer	6.75/10	9.25/10	9.25/10	9.25/10
GameSpot	7.5/10	8/10	8.1/10	8/10
GameSpy	4.5/5	3/5	3.5/5	3/5
IGN	8/10	8/10	8.3/10	7.6/10
Nintendo Power	4.2/5	4.7/5		
Official U.S. PlayStation Magazine			4.5/5	
Official Xbox Magazine (US)				8/10

Award
Publication	Award
6th Annual Interactive Achievement Awards	Outstanding Achievement in Visual Engineering

The Lord of the Rings: The Two Towers received "generally favorable reviews" across all systems; the Game Boy Advance version holds an aggregate score of 78 out of 100 on Metacritic, based on fifteen reviews; the GameCube version 82 out of 100, based on thirteen reviews; the PlayStation 2 version 82 out of 100, based on thirty-two reviews; and the Xbox version 79 out of 100, based on seventeen reviews.

Game Informer's Matthew Kato scored the PlayStation 2 version 9.25 out of 10, calling the gameplay "every bit as fast and furious as Mark of Kri's, without some of the thinking involved." IGN's Douglass C. Perry scored it 8.3 out of 10. Although he was critical of the game's length, he declared "as a game on its own merits, The Two Towers is a solid beat-em-up that's definitely worth owning." GameSpot's Ryan MacDonald scored it 8.1 out of 10. He too was critical of the length, but called the game "a traditional action game with a terrific gameplay system that encourages you to battle it out like there's no tomorrow." GameSpy's Benjamin Turner scored it 3.5 out of 5. He was critical of the FMV footage, and concluded "The Two Towers isn't the best action game you'll ever play, but it is the best action game based on The Lord of the Rings. For fans looking for a way to play their favorite books or movies, this is the best bet at the moment." Eurogamer's Kristan Reed scored it 7 out of 10. He had mixed feelings about the integration of film footage; "the quality of these recreated scenes isn't always as good as it could be, thanks to some less than cutting edge rendering. That said, it's still a nice way of introducing a new scene." His biggest criticism was that the game was too short, although he praised the "DVD extras" being linked to level progression. He concluded "it's fun while it lasts, but requires relatively little skill."

The PlayStation 2 version also received some non-video game publication attention. For example, The Cincinnati Enquirer's Marc Saltzman scored it 4.5 out of 5, calling it "a solid pick - especially for players who enjoy nonstop action - that lives up to the expectations set by the movie." Playboy scored it 88%, saying it "should appeal to nerdy D&D chicks and foxy fantasy fans alike." Entertainment Weekly's Geoff Keighly scored it a B+, calling it "a gaming experience that works with - rather than exploits - the source material." Maxim's Alex Porter was less impressed, scoring it 6 out of 10, and arguing "the graphics and sound (enhanced by the actual voices of the movie's stars) [are] well-rendered and intricate [...] but players [will get] bored with repetitive thrusting and parrying."

GameSpy's William Cassidy scored the Game Boy Advance version 4.5 out of 5, praising the graphics, sound, combat system and the differentiation between the controllable characters. His only complaint was that "the amount of sometimes pointless wandering." He called the game "an engaging, action-packed adventure that admirably re-creates the captivating atmosphere of the films. The characters, the locales, and even the music draw you in and create an exciting experience that will have you playing through the entire quest several times." IGN's Craig Harris scored it 8 out of 10, comparing it to Diablo and Gauntlet, and praising the co-op mode. He concluded "even though The Two Towers is far from "boring," it does get a little repetitive in its hack-and-slash design." GameSpot's Frank Provo scored it 7.5 out of 10, writing "it's mainly a Diablo or Gauntlet clone with story elements from the movie sprinkled throughout. With that in mind, it's surprisingly fun to roam throughout the lands of Middle-earth, slaying orcs and goblins."

Game Informer's Justin Leeper scored the Xbox version 9.25 out of 10, calling it "a tremendous game [...] the graphics are outstanding, and the seamless integration between real-time and FMV cutscenes will take your breath away." GameSpot's Ryan MacDonald scored both the Xbox and the GameCube versions 8 out of 10, calling it "a traditional hack-and-slash action game that features great gameplay mechanics, stunning visuals, and lots of extras." IGN's Hilary Goldstein scored it 7.6 out of 10, writing "while The Two Towers is fun, it's not really one of the better action games around. It does nothing new and there are a lot of problems that detract from the experience." He was critical of the targeting system, the camera, the rigid linearity of each level and the inability to issue commands to AI controlled allies. He also wrote "the Xbox version is inferior to the sharp and stunning quality of what was found on PS2. There's a ton of texture problems, poor contrast, and less detail than what's found on the PS2. That's not acceptable for a game coming out two months later and on a system that is easier to program for and can churn out incredible graphics with little effort." GameSpy's David Hodgson scored it 3 out of 5, writing "with the PlayStation 2 being all "inferior" to the Xbox's presumed power, and the two months of extra development time, surely E.A. must have added an extra aiming reticule for the archery, increased the frame rate from 30, sculpted a few more polygons on the main heroes and adversaries, and added reflections to the underwater orcs and other badly realized reflections. Well, don't bet on it, Bilbo. There are absolutely no differences between this, the GameCube, and the PlayStation 2 versions."

Game Informer's Matthew Kato scored the GameCube version 9.25 out of 10, calling it "a blueprint on how to make a very good movie-based game." IGN's Douglass C. Perry scored it 8 out of 10. Comparing the game to the PlayStation 2 and Xbox versions, he wrote "the textures are much more clean, the rough edges are all smoothed out, and the particle lighting effects are even slightly more radiant than before." GameSpy's David Hodgson scored it 3 out of 5. He was critical of the length, and that it did not improve on the PlayStation 2 version; "think that the extra two months you waited for the GameCube version of the game allowed E.A. to fix the sometimes-problematic archery aiming, increase the framerate from 30, add extra polygons to the characters and foes, and tweak the water reflections so they actually look realistic? Then you're smoking more pipe-weed than the whole of Hobbiton. There are literally no differences between this, the Xbox, and the PlayStation 2 offerings."

=== Sales and awards ===
The game was a huge commercial success, selling almost four million units across all platforms, considerably more than Vivendi Universal Game's The Fellowship of the Ring, which sold just over one million units. The Two Towers also attracted considerably better reviews. By July 2006, the PlayStation 2 version of The Two Towers had sold 1.5 million copies and earned $65 million in the United States. In 2007, the game achieved Platinum Hits and Classic status on Xbox for selling more than 2 million copies worldwide on the platform. Next Generation ranked it as the 28th highest-selling game launched for the PlayStation 2, Xbox or GameCube between January 2000 and July 2006 in that country. In the United States, it was the highest-selling Lord of the Rings game released in the 2000s for consoles by July 2006, and the highest-selling version of The Two Towers. The PlayStation 2 and Xbox versions also received a "Double Platinum" sales award from the Entertainment and Leisure Software Publishers Association (ELSPA), indicating sales of at least 600,000 copies in the United Kingdom.

During the 6th Annual Interactive Achievement Awards, the Academy of Interactive Arts & Sciences honored The Two Towers with an award for "Outstanding Achievement in Visual Engineering"; it also received a nomination for "Outstanding Achievement in Sound Design".

GameSpot named The Two Towers the second-best Xbox game, and second-best GameCube game, of January 2003.
