= Interex =

Interex may refer to:

- HP-Interex
- The Interex division of Les Mousquetaires
