= Old Time Baseball =

1995 sports video game

- Developer(s): Stormfront Studios
- Publisher(s): Stormfront Studios
- Platform(s): MS-DOS
- Release: November 7, 1995
- Genre(s): Sports
- Mode(s): Single-player

Old Time Baseball is a 1995 sports video game designed and programmed by Don Daglow, Hudson Piehl, Clay Dreslough, and James Grove. It was developed and published for MS-DOS by Stormfront Studios. Built on the Tony La Russa Baseball engine, Old Time Baseball includes complete lineups of every major league team from 1871 to 1981, totaling 12,000 players.

== Gameplay ==
=== Teams ===
Players can replay historical seasons from every major league in baseball history:

- National Association
- National League
- American Association
- Union Association
- Players' League
- American League
- Federal League

In addition to playing with historical teams, users can build their own teams, and pit any team (custom or historical) against any other.

=== Ballparks ===
Many of the historical ballparks were built based on actual old construction blueprints.

- Ebbets Field, former home of the Brooklyn Dodgers. The famous "hit this spot, win a suit" ad and the Schaefer's Beer sign are included on the outfield walls.
- Old Comiskey Park, at that time scheduled for demolition by the Chicago White Sox.
- Crosley Field, former home of the Cincinnati Reds .
- Fenway Park, as it appeared in the heyday of Ted Williams, Johnny Pesky and Bobby Doerr.
- Polo Grounds, former home of the New York Giants, with its cavernous center field where Willie Mays caught the famous Vic Wertz drive in the 1954 World Series.
- Shibe Park, former home of both the Philadelphia Phillies and the Philadelphia Athletics.
- Sportsman's Park, former home of the St. Louis Cardinals and St. Louis Browns, where more games were played than any other park in history.
- Wrigley Field, from the days of Ernie Banks and Ron Santo.
- Yankee Stadium, in its pre-1970s form with the short right field porch and spacious left field.

=== Announcers ===
Users can select between play by play announcers Mel Allen, of the New York Yankees, and Curt Gowdy, who did network broadcasts for many years in addition to announcing for the Boston Red Sox.

=== Baseball Time Machine ===
Baseball Time Machine allows users to play any game in any individual year from 1871 through the present. This includes games in unique times like 1930, when baseball sought to lure fans during the Depression and juiced the ball so much that the batting average for baseball overall surpassed .300. The following year the ball was returned to more typical physics.

Other popular "let's see what happens" years for players are 1871. When the game visually looked more like softball, and 1942–45. When World War II stripped the major leagues of most of its established players.

The Baseball Time Machine allows players to try to resolve the most famous baseball arguments of all time, what would happen if Sandy Koufax pitched to Babe Ruth. How would the 1927 Yankees do against the Big Red Machine?

The game also offers the chance to play games in any of six different major baseball eras:

- 1871–1892 -- Early Baseball, when the field dimensions were different and pitchers threw the ball softball-style, underhanded.
- 1893–1919 -- The Dead Ball Era, when the pitcher's mound location and pitching style matched modern baseball, but the ball was marginally softer and would not fly as far. During this era it was routine for 10 home runs to be the league leader's total. A majority of those might be inside the park home runs that were the result of speed, not power.
- 1920–1945 -- The Babe Ruth Era, when then-pitcher Ruth changed the game by his tremendous power. The live ball replaced the dead ball as baseball sought to make fans forget the Black Sox Scandal.
- 1946–1960 -- The Golden Age, when post-war optimism, television, and the integration of baseball by Jackie Robinson, Larry Doby and Branch Rickey created a new level of success for the game.
- 1961–1976 -- The Expansion Era, when baseball added many new teams, both increasing its influence and diluting its talent even as other sports like American football, basketball, and ice hockey eroded its dominance of TV sports.
- 1977–1995 -- Modern Baseball, when continued expansion and the Free Agency created by the growth of the players union continued to change the game.

== Development ==
Daglow had written the basic mathematical models for the Baseball Time Machine in an unpublished 1980 game with the working title Apple Baseball, an extension of his Baseball game which he wrote on the then-new Apple II before joining the Intellivision game design team.

== Reception ==
Reception

Review score
Publication	Score
Albuquerque Journal	4/5

== See also ==
- Baseball mainframe computer game
- Intellivision World Series Baseball
- Earl Weaver Baseball
- Tony La Russa Baseball
- ESPN Baseball Tonight
