= Blue Sky Rangers =

Group of Intellivision video game programmers

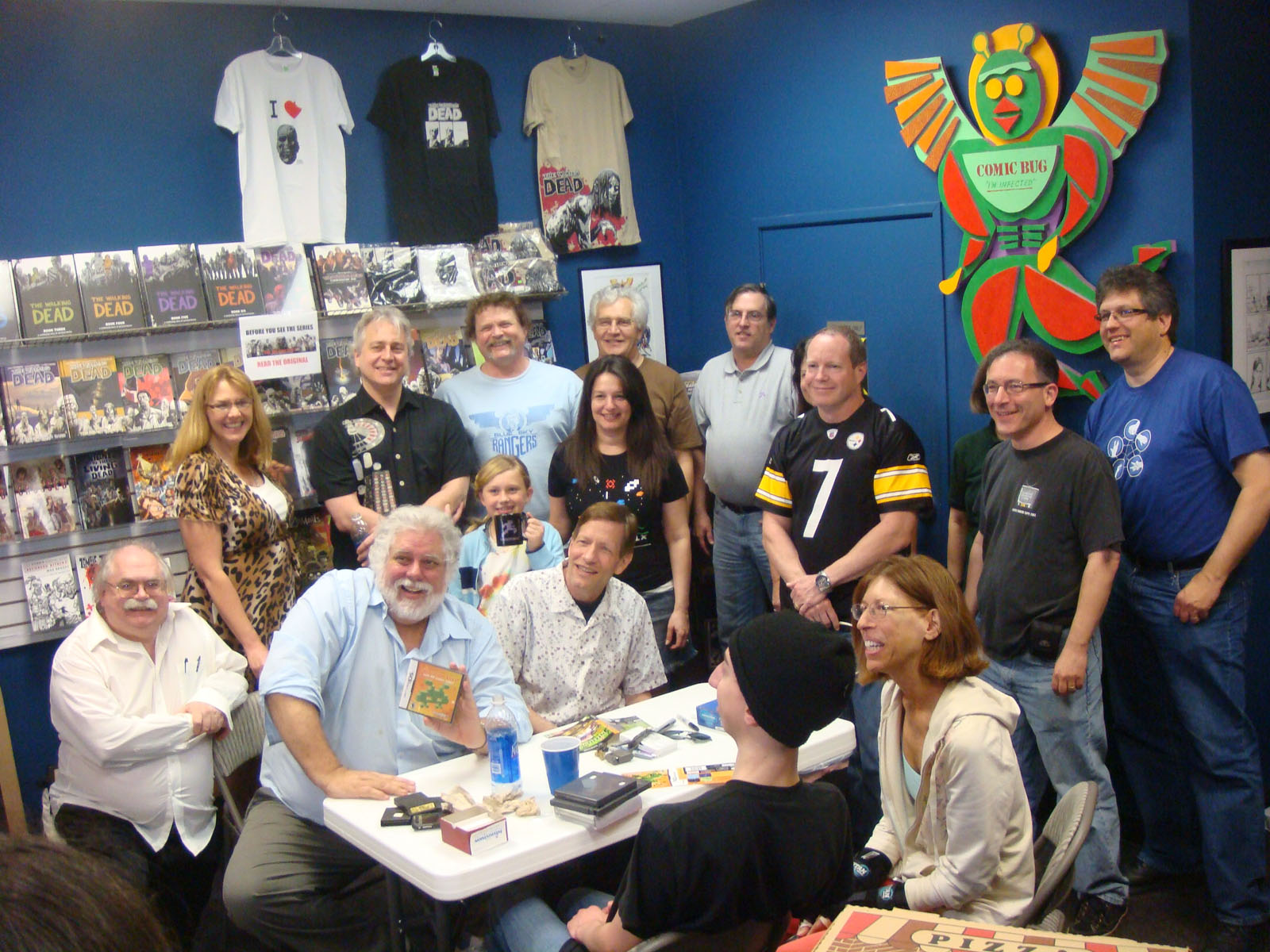
The 2011 reunion of the Blue Sky Rangers

The Blue Sky Rangers are a group of Intellivision game programmers who previously worked for Mattel in the early 1980s.

When the Intellivision first came out in 1978, its games were all developed by an outside firm, APh Technological Consulting. Realizing that potential profits are much greater with first party software, Mattel formed its own in-house software development group. The original five members of that Intellivision team were manager Gabriel Baum, Don Daglow, Rick Levine, Mike Minkoff and John Sohl. Levine and Minkoff (a long-time Mattel Toys veteran) both came over from the hand-held Mattel games engineering team. To keep these and later programmers (the Mattel team peaked at 110 people in 1983) from being hired away by rival Atari, their identity and work location was kept a closely guarded secret.

In 1982, TV Guide published an article about Intellivision's secret programming team. The writer of the article wanted to come up with some group name other than "The Application Software Programmers," so he came up with the name "The Blue Sky Rangers." This was based on the programming group's "Blue Sky Meetings," which were a series of brainstorming sessions for new game ideas.

This name stuck and the programmers were (and still are) collectively referred to as the Blue Sky Rangers. One of the early programmers, Keith Robinson, re-acquired the rights to Intellivision in recent years and the Blue Sky Rangers' games are now available on a variety of computers and video game platforms, as well as mobile phones. These copyrights are currently held by Atari SA, who acquired the Intellivision brand name and related assets from the former Intellivision Entertainment in 2024. Astrosmash and Shark! Shark!, two prominent Intellivision titles, were not included in the sale, as the two properties were already sold to BBG Entertainment GmbH in the preceding year.

== Members ==
- Don Daglow
- Eddie Dombrower
- Connie Goldman
- Rick Koenig
- Dave Warhol

== See also ==
- M Network
