= Rebel Space =

1992 play-by-email video game

Rebel Space was the second play-by-email game offered as part of a major commercial online service. It ran on Prodigy from 1992 to 1995. The game was developed by Stormfront Studios, designed by Don Daglow and programmed by Mark Buchignani.

Rebel Space was offered by Prodigy online service in the summer of 1992 as a combination PBEM (play by email) strategy game and posting board system. Games were numbered with letters and numbers to denote when they began, the first game being AA01. Prodigy had three game speeds of varying number of required turns per week, the fastest paced being five moves per week (one each Monday through Friday) and the slowest being one move per week.

The original tagline in advertisements for the game was "The Empire fell, now what?" The premise was that a galaxy spanning Empire was in terminal decline, and forty commanders of Empire Fleets were the seeds of possible new empires.

Rebel Space was an online community as well as a game. The posting boards were populated by thousands of players and many of them were regulars at such virtual hangouts as "Wits End", "Top of the Galaxy", and "Lord Drexion's Wrath". The social aspect of the game was of great interest to some, and utterly uninteresting to others, but it added a dramatic counterpoint to the game movements to those who got involved there. For several years, groups of friends from Rebel Space had get togethers all over the USA so players could meet.

The game itself was fairly simple:

Each commander had four Starships under his control and these starships could be upgraded with MODS (modules) that would increase the ships capabilities. To add a MOD to a ship the ship had to end its turn's movement on a friendly Starbase, i.e. a Starbase owned by that commander or a Starbase belonging to the same faction as that commander. Every ship started with one Engine Mod and one Scan Mod to give it the minimum movement distance (four squares) and minimum scanning range (the square passed through plus one adjoining square for the flight path of the ship).

The list of MODS included:

- TLU - Tactical Laser Unit, an offensive weapon.
- SHD - Shields or defensive protection for the Starship.
- DEF - Defense Mods added to the defensive protection of a planet owned by that commander.
- ENV - Environmental Mods added one or more levels to an owned planet's Environmental Level if the Starship ended its turn there.
- TCH - Technological Mods added one or more levels to an owned planet's Technological Level if the Starship ended its turn there.
- SCN - Scan Mods added one additional square of range to the scanning range of a ship. A max of three Scan Mods could be on a ship.
- ENG - Engine Mods added two additional squares of range to the ships movement. Ships started with one ENG Mod (a range of four) and could have a max of three ENG Mods, so ship range could be four, six, or eight squares of movement. The game was laid out on a grid numbered row 1 to 99 north to south and A to O east to west. The center of the galaxy, H50, was a Starbase held by the Empire, and all forty commanders started there. Two spaces "North" and "South" of this Starbase were Jump Points. If a ship left the Starbase and moved North two squares it would land on a Jump Point and jump to the next Jump Point in that direction of travel. Movement from H50 to the next Starbase at H40 could be done by moving North, North (Jumps), North, North. A common strategy was to move North or South several Starbases building up the Mods on the Starships each turn until the center of the galaxy was left behind. Like the Starbases all planets were owned by the Empire, but unlike Starbases the planets were not defended. When a player found an area with planets they would start capturing (colonizing) them to build their own empire.

Initially all the commanders were of the same alliance: Empire. At some point, generally in the first third of the game, commanders would rebel from the Empire by choosing one of three factions (Environmentalist, Militarist, or Scientist) they preferred. Each faction had certain advantages. Environmentalists developed their colonized worlds in Environmental level without any special actions taken. This gave them more rapid advancement of Tech level also. Scientists advanced Tech levels most rapidly without special actions taken, even on worlds with lower Environment level the Tech levels would still advance faster. Militarists had the advantage of more firepower from offensive weapons and stronger defenses to better protect planets. The Empire and the Rogue factions had no special abilities.

After joining the rebellion all Empire planets and ships were enemies as well as planets and ships of the two other factions not chosen. Ending movement on an enemy planet resulted in combat with that planet. If enemy ships were also at that planet a battle would first happen with the enemy ships present and then with the planet after the ship to ship battles were decided if all enemy ships were eliminated. If a planets defenses were destroyed, the planet would then be captured and added to that commander's list of controlled planets.

Later in the game, a commander could also elect to become "Rogue" which meant all other players would be enemy regardless of which faction they belonged to. This was a useful ability to enable the taking of planets from another player of the same faction.

In addition to ownership (which commander owned it) and faction (which of the three factions that planet belonged to) planets had the additional properties of Environmental Level and Technological Level. These levels ranged from 1–5 with 5 being the highest. Technological Level would independently progress on all worlds that joined the rebellion, and would slowly decline on worlds that stayed under Empire control. The higher the Environmental Level of a planet caused Technological Level progression occur faster. Higher Technology Levels made a planet worth more points in the standings of the commanders. When a planet reached the highest Technological Level it became a Starbase.

At the end of each game the top half of the commanders score list received a promotion, the bottom half did not. The top player in each game was named the Rebel Lord and received a fabric patch and free start to the next game from Prodigy.

This gaming system initially put a big premium on efficiently searching and colonizing planets quickly. Early alliances in Rebel Space were typified by groups such as The Crimson Knights, and The Q Alliance which were rapid colonizer groups that acted in coordinated fashion with one another to insure frictionless colonization. These early large but relatively undefended empires begged the evolution of predatory alliances, such as the dreaded *M*E*V* alliance, which would locate areas of dense colonization and devour them. Later groups such as the Destruction Team (DT) carried this predation to ever greater levels of efficiency.

Additionally, some other main alliances were the Sensix Alliance, C*A*R*N*A*G*E, and the Flur De Lis. Some factions warred against others and even had different members playing different factions (Environmentalist, Scientist, Militarist) or Rogues in concert with each other. Doing this required a great deal of coordination and there were even spies who were double agents. Overall, it was a complex and advanced gaming community for its day.

Many players participated in Rebel Space, but most noteworthy were those who reached the top of the ranking lists. This rank was called Star Marshall, and three of the many Star Marshalls of Rebel Space were Thor (Crimson Knights), Race Pilsner (*M*E*V*), and Klaatu (DT).

== Reception ==
Reception

Review score
| Publication | Score |
|---|---|
| Computer Gaming World | 3/5 stars |

Computer Gaming World in 1993 recommended Rebel Space to newcomers to PBEM games because of its simplicity. A 1994 survey of strategic space games set in the year 2000 and later gave the game three stars out of five, stating that "the GMs keep the universe quite lively and interesting".
