= Tony La Russa's Ultimate Baseball =

1991 video game

- Developer: Beyond Software, Inc.
- Publisher: Strategic Simulations, Inc.
- Designer: Don Daglow
- Composer: George Sanger
- Series: Tony La Russa Baseball
- Platforms: Commodore 64; DOS
- Release: NA: 1991
- Genre: Sport
- Modes: Single-player, multiplayer

Tony La Russa's Ultimate Baseball is the first game in the Tony La Russa Baseball series, published in 1991 for DOS and Commodore 64.

== Reception ==
Reception

Review score
Publication	Score
Los Angeles Times	5/5

Computer Gaming World in 1991 praised its VGA graphics, and concluded that the game "packs a tremendous amount into a single box". A 1992 review by the same author of expansion disks was less favorable. It praised the accuracy of a recreation of the 1990 Major League Baseball season, but criticized the incomplete rosters. The magazine stating that the game "still falls short of its potential ... TLRUB may be a bit closer to the "ultimate" with these disks, but it's not there yet". The magazine nonetheless that year named Tony La Russa's Ultimate Baseball as 1992's best sports game.

Computer Gaming World reviewed the game and stated that "Another nice touch in TLUB is the "Streak Rating." Players can be rated from A-H in this rating. This notes the fact that some players inevitably start off the season on fire, but then tail off in production, while other players start off slowly and become "Mr. October"s. The new rating means that one will get a realistic view of Ryne Sandberg- and Reggie Jackson-style players (Ryno usually has a rough first couple of months of the season, Jackson performed better as the season closed). It is an impressive addition."

Tony La Russa's Ultimate Baseball sold 85,684 copies, becoming SSI's most successful non-Dungeons & Dragons game.
