= DECUS =

Independent computer user group related to Digital Equipment Corporation

Digital Equipment Computer Users' Society
- Nickname: DECUS
- Merged into: Encompass; HP-Interex; ITUG
- Successor: Connect User Group Community
- Formation: March 1961; 65 years ago
- Founder: Edward Fredkin
- Dissolved: 2008; 18 years ago
- Type: Users' group
- Legal status: Company
- Purpose: Digital Equipment Corporation products
- Location: United States
- Members: 7,500
- Website: DECUServe On-Line

The Digital Equipment Computer Users' Society (DECUS) was an independent computer user group related to Digital Equipment Corporation (DEC). The Connect User Group Community, formed from the consolidation in May, 2008 of DECUS, Encompass, HP-Interex, and ITUG is the Hewlett-Packard’s largest user community, representing more than 50,000 participants.

== History ==
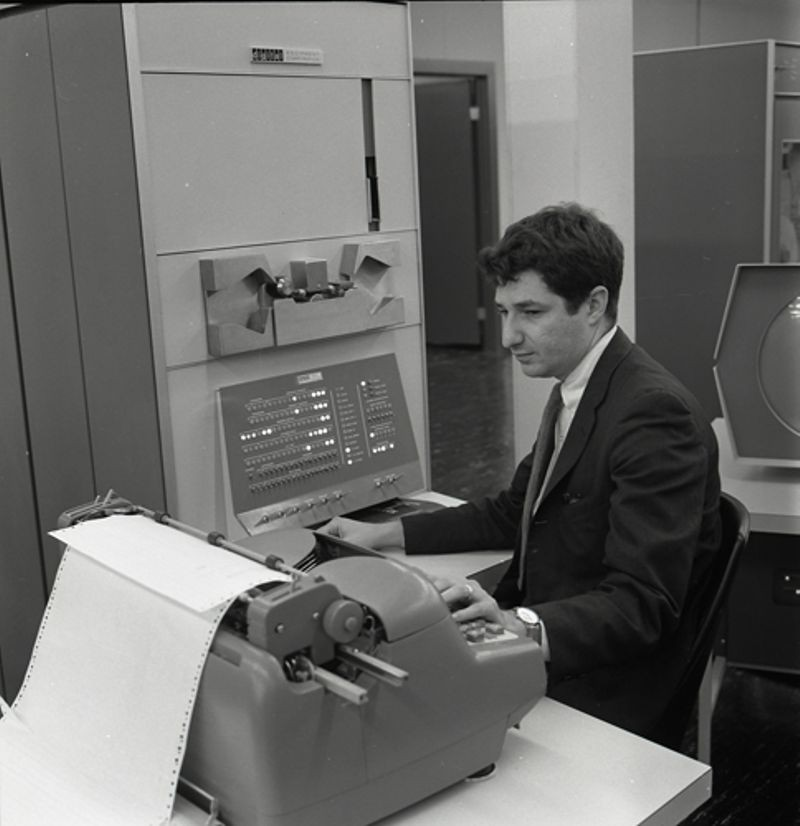
Edward Fredkin, founder of DECUS, pictured on a PDP-1 in 1960

DECUS was the Digital Equipment Computer Users' Society, a users' group for Digital Equipment Corporation (DEC) computers. Members included companies and organizations who purchased DEC equipment; many members were application programmers who wrote code for DEC machines or system programmers who managed DEC systems. DECUS was founded in March 1961 by Edward Fredkin.

DECUS was legally a part of Digital Equipment Corporation and subsidized by the company; however, it was run by unpaid volunteers. Digital staff members were not eligible to join DECUS, yet were allowed and encouraged to participate in DECUS activities. Digital, in turn, relied on DECUS as an important channel of communication with its customers.

=== DECUS Software Library ===
DECUS had a software library which accepted orders from anyone, distributing programs submitted to it by people willing to share. It was organized by processor and operating system, using information submitted by program submitters, who signed releases allowing this and asserting their right to do so. The DECUS library published catalogs of these offerings yearly, though because it had the catalog mastered by an outside firm, it did not have easy ways to retrieve the content of early catalogs (prior to circa 1980) in machine readable format. Later material was maintained in house and was more easily edited. The charges for copying were somewhat high, reflecting the fact the copies were made by hand on DECUS equipment.

=== Activities ===
There were two DECUS US symposia per year, at which members and DEC employees gave presentations, and could visit an exhibit hall containing many new computer models and peripherals among other things. By grace of the DEC employees, it became a custom to allow users to copy media for one another on these machines. This activity grew with time, and in the spring of 1977 some volunteers from the RSX SIG (Special Interest Group) led by Phil Cannon, Jim Neeland, and several others, arranged an informal drop-off, and made master distributions of all material submitted. Then they and other volunteers essentially made copies of this master distribution on tapes for the rest of the symposium, for anyone with a blank tape to write on.

This very quickly grew, and was noted in LUG (local user group) and SIG (special interest group) newsletters. The process of creating a master quickly attracted other volunteers who would make a master index of whatever had been submitted. The process of physically creating master tapes remained much the same until around 1979, when the tapecopy coordinators arranged copying facilities somewhere near the symposium site, because 9-track tape drives were not appearing as much on the exhibit hall floor often enough to be relied on. By fall 1979, there was a release form used with submissions, so that the DECUS library could redistribute the combined tapes, making them more easily available to members who did not get to the symposia. The VAX/VMS SIG started producing SIG tapes in spring 1979 and other SIGs, notably RSTS, RT-11, Languages and Tools, and the 10/20 SIGs, had analogous distributions made in somewhat similar fashion.

The distribution by copying only at the symposium was seen to be inadequate, so a tree of volunteers, each of whom would receive a copy of the material and make multiple copies for others, was devised. In these cases, the person desiring the material was expected to furnish blank media, as no money ever changed hands. The tapes grew in size constantly, and eventually moved to 8mm Exabyte media and to CDs, and then to DVDs. By that time nobody worried much about the relatively modest cost of blank media.

The RSX SIG tapes continued until 1992, when material was drying up. Some RSX material was put on VMS SIG tapes after that, and around 1987 the Languages and Tools SIG tapes were merged in. The distributions continued to be released twice a year until 2005, and were released yearly in 2006 and 2007 when the tapecopy coordinator who had been making masters since the mid 1980s, Glenn Everhart, retired from the role. By that time, network distribution had become good enough that media copy was no longer necessary in most places.

The SIG tapes contained a large variety of material which has been useful as examples of prior art in patent disputes. They always favored distribution of full sources (and occasionally omitted binary-only submissions), making them match what patent examiners understand as "publication". DECUS media have always been available to anyone in the public, just more awkward for some to obtain than for others.

DECUS published a number of printed periodicals. Its newsletter DECUSCOPE ran from April 1962 until (at least) 1992. Copy-N-Mail, focussed on the PDP-10, ran from 1973 to 1980. Other DECUS publications released at various times include DECUS magazine, the Moby Munger (from the SIG for the TECO text editor), DECUS Update, and DECUS Journal.

The DECUS U.S. Chapter conducted technical conferences at various locations, and ran other operations like Local User Groups (LUGs) and Special Interest Groups. Chapters in other nations did likewise. DECUS also promoted the open exchange of user-developed software, largely via magnetic media.

DECUS played a critical role in the development of computer games in North America in the 1970s. The pioneering titles Adventure by Will Crowther; Baseball, Dungeon and Star Trek by Don Daglow, and Hunt the Wumpus by Gregory Yob provided a foundation for the games industry. One of the first real-time interactive multi-user games, MTrek (MultiTrek), was also distributed on DECUS tapes. Major commercial game titles including Zork and Empire were first popularized by DECUS.

In the 1990s, DECUS played a significant role in integration of isolated post-Soviet scientific, technology, and business communities into the worldwide community.

In May 1998, Compaq acquired Digital, and DECUS became a Compaq user group. The technical conference continued, with Compaq announcing the Galaxy Software Architecture for OpenVMS at the October 1998 conference, and new hardware and software at the 1999 conference.

In 1999, Compaq urged DECUS to merge with the International Tandem Users' Group for users of Tandem Computer Systems, which was also owned by Compaq. A board member leaked information about the confidential merger discussions to the membership and was censured by the Board. In 2000, the DECUS U.S. Chapter incorporated as the independent user group Encompass.

In 2002, Hewlett-Packard acquired Compaq, and DECUS became an HP User Society.

In 2008, the HP user communities Encompass, ITUG, and HP Interex EMEA consolidated to form Connect Worldwide.

== Local chapters ==
Membership was organized by country. Each chapter acted as part of the worldwide Association of Hewlett-Packard User Groups. DECUS had some 7,500 members, mostly system, network, and applications specialists as well as IT managers.

Association activities: The HP User Society DECUS promoted the exchange of information and know-how between its members, manufacturers and partners. The association supported its members in the representation of their interests against HP and partners, helped in problem solving and facilitates formation of opinion and advanced training by organizing events.

== Well-known members ==
Some early and well-known members of DECUS were the late Terry Shannon and John R. Wisniewski.

== See also ==
- Connect (users group)
- History of free software
