= Tony La Russa Baseball 4 =

1997 video game

- Developer: Stormfront Studios
- Publisher: Maxis
- Series: Tony La Russa Baseball
- Platform: Windows
- Release: June 11, 1997

Tony La Russa Baseball 4 is a 1997 video game developed by Stormfront Studios and published by Maxis. The game is named after Hall of Famer baseball person Tony La Russa.

== Gameplay ==
Tony La Russa Baseball 4 is presented as a traditional baseball simulation. On the field, pitching is straightforward: players select from a handful of pitches, aim within the strike zone, and let the pitcher's ratings determine the outcome. Batting, players can choose to swing for contact, power, or normally. The game's management and simulation systems allow players to set managerial preferences and trust the AI to run the team, while the simulation engine processes entire seasons in minutes.

== Reception ==
Reception

Review scores
Publication	Score
Computer Gaming World	2/5
Computer Games Magazine	2/5
GameSpot	5.3/10
Gamecenter	2/5
PC Gameworld	62%
PC Gamer	62%
The Cincinnati Enquirer	3/4

GameSpot gave the game a score of 5.3 out of 10 stating "Even with its few strong points (simulation, management), this product is far from a winner. There are already five traditional computer baseball games on the market this year, and Tony La Russa Baseball 4 is the worst of the lot".
