= Digital Review =

Defunct computer magazine

Digital Review was a trade magazine focusing on the market created by Digital Equipment Corporation (DEC), at the time the second largest computer company; IBM was number one.

== History ==
They were published independently from October 1983 thru August 1992 by Ziff-Davis. At that point, they were acquired and merged with Digital News; the new title was Digital News & Review. The Boston Globe had described the situation between the prior publication owners as "The war among the Digitals: Bitter competition reflects growing rivalry between Ziff, McGovern empires." The combined Digital News & Review periodical was printed from 1992 to 1996 by Reed Business Information. That title ceased publishing "due to the lack of an advertising base."

== See also ==
- Terry Shannon (IT)#Writing career
