= Tony La Russa Baseball 3: 1996 Edition =

1996 video game

- Developer: Stormfront Studios
- Publisher: Stormfront Studios
- Series: Tony La Russa Baseball
- Platforms: MS-DOS; Windows
- Release: May 7, 1996

Tony La Russa Baseball 3: 1996 Edition is a 1996 baseball video game from Stormfront Studios. The game is an upgraded version of Tony La Russa Baseball 3 and it features play-by-play from Hall of Famer Mel Allen as well as announcer Hank Greenwald.

== Gameplay ==
Tony La Russa Baseball 3: 1996 Edition is a strategy-driven baseball simulation which emphasizes managerial control and long-term play. Players create a custom "baseball universe," drafting teams, calling up prospects from the minors, or even building rosters from scratch. Players can take the field or manage from the dugout, crafting detailed strategies like deciding when to hit-and-run or play conservatively. The game offers extensive statistics and options. The 1996 edition adds a head-to-head stats that reveal historical matchups between pitchers and batters, helping managers make critical decisions about pinch-hitting or bullpen moves. Gameplay refinements include adjustable speeds for pitching, batting, and fielding.

== Reception ==
Reception

Review scores
Publication	Score
Computer Gaming World	4/5
Computer Player	8/10
GameSpot	8.2/10

CNET said "Stormfront Studios is its own biggest competitor, and still the company goes the extra inning. La Russa has topped itself, which means that the best CD-ROM baseball action game/simulation is even better."

GameSpot gave the game a score of 8.2 out of 10' stating: "By addressing some of the problems with the earlier version, TLB: 96 Edition takes a very good game and makes it even better".
