= The Spiderwick Chronicles (video game) =

2008 video game

- Developer: Stormfront Studios
- Publisher: Vivendi Games (Note: Released under the Sierra Entertainment brand name)
- Designer: KnowWonder
- Platforms: Microsoft Windows; Nintendo DS; PlayStation 2 Wii; Xbox 360
- Release: NA: February 5, 2008; EU: March 14, 2008
- Genre: Action-adventure
- Modes: Single-player, multiplayer

The Spiderwick Chronicles is an action-adventure video game adaptation of the film of the same name. It was released on February 5, 2008, in North America, and on March 14, 2008, in Europe for Microsoft Windows, Nintendo DS, Wii, Xbox 360 and PlayStation 2.

== Plot ==
When Jared, Simon and Mallory Grace move into the Spiderwick estate, they discover the late owner's field guide to fairies. They soon discover a hidden world all around them, populated with creatures such as brownies, goblins and sprites. However, Jared and his family are in grave danger, because Mulgarath, an ogre, wants to steal the book for himself.

The Spiderwick Chronicles script mixes the events of the film with some elements from the original books.

== Gameplay ==
The game's playable characters are Jared, Simon and Mallory, and Thimbletack can be used to explore small areas. Each character has a unique weapon with which to fight against evil creatures. The Grace children can capture Sprites to give them special power-ups. The gameplay is a mix of exploration, puzzle solving, and combat. There are items to find, Sprites to catch, and areas to check.

== Reception ==
Reception

Aggregate scores
Aggregator	Score				
Aggregator	DS	PC	PS2	Wii	Xbox 360
GameRankings	64.13%	63.50%	65.00%	64.36%	63.00%
Metacritic	60/100	61/100	64/100	62/100	59/100

Review scores
Publication	Score				
Publication	DS	PC	PS2	Wii	Xbox 360
1Up.com	20/100	N/A	50/100	N/A	50/100
4Players	N/A	71%	70%	70%	70%
Eurogamer	N/A	6/10	6/10	5.5/10 (Note: Eurogamer.net rated the game 5/10, meanwhile Eurogamer.de rated the game 6/10.)	5.5/10
Game Informer	N/A	N/A	N/A	N/A	6.5/10
GameRevolution	C−	C−	C−	C−	C−
GamesMaster	N/A	N/A	N/A	N/A	7.3/10
GameSpot	N/A	N/A	N/A	6/10	N/A
GamesRadar+	2/5	2/5	N/A	4/10	2/5
GameStar	N/A	59%	N/A	N/A	N/A
GameZone	7/10	5.5/10	7.9/10	5/10	7/10
IGN	7.8/10	7.5/10	7/10	7.5/10	7.6/10
Jeuxvideo.com	11/20	11/20	11/20	11/20	11/20
NGamer	N/A	N/A	N/A	6.9/10	N/A
Nintendo World Report	6/10	N/A	N/A	7/10	N/A
PlayStation Official Magazine – UK	N/A	N/A	5/10	N/A	N/A
Official Xbox Magazine (UK)	N/A	N/A	N/A	N/A	6/10
Official Xbox Magazine (US)	N/A	N/A	N/A	N/A	6/10
PALGN	N/A	N/A	6/10	N/A	N/A
PC Gamer (UK)	N/A	5.9/10	N/A	N/A	N/A
Pocket Gamer	6/10	N/A	N/A	N/A	N/A
PSM3	N/A	N/A	5/10	N/A	N/A
TeamXbox	N/A	N/A	N/A	N/A	4/10
VideoGamer.com	N/A	N/A	8/10	N/A	8/10
Nintendo, le magazine officiel	N/A	N/A	N/A	5.5/10	N/A
Official PlayStation 2 Magazine (UK)	N/A	N/A	7/10	N/A	N/A
PC Action	N/A	67%	N/A	N/A	N/A
USA Today	N/A	N/A	N/A	6/10	N/A

The Spiderwick Chronicles received "mixed or average" according to review aggregator Metacritic.
