= Sonny Monosson =

Newspaper owner/publisher

Adolf F. "Sonny" Monosson (c. 1927 - 2003) was known for having established a market in leasing Digital Equipment Corporation (DEC) computer hardware at a time when DEC preferred that it be purchased. He also was "author of a newsletter on Digital" systems.

== Early life ==
He enrolled at Massachusetts Institute of Technology (MIT) at age 16, left for two years in the Navy, then graduated from MIT in 1948 and "earned an MBA from Harvard Business School in 1950." Monosson worked for his father's clothing manufacturing business for about six years, and then left "to start Berkeley Finance Co., a provider of commercial credit."

== Career ==
His computer hardware business was named American Used Computers; his newsletter was titled Monosson on DEC. His writings also appeared on the Digital Business pages of Digital News

The photos atop his writings were notable for "his signature bow tie;" his "Turning Problems into Profit -- and Other Life Lessons" book was published posthumously.

== Family ==
"He married Gloria Haskins, the daughter of a Brookline doctor" the day after receiving his MBA. They named their daughters Susan, Debbie, Judith and Emily. He was survived by his wife, four daughters, and four grandchildren.
