= EWB Baseball =

2009 video game

- Developer: Eddie Dombrower
- Publisher: Eddie Dombrower
- Platform: iOS
- Release: March 23, 2009
- Genre: Sports
- Modes: Single-player, multiplayer

EWB Baseball is an iOS baseball sports game designed and published by Eddie Dombrower based on Earl Weaver Baseball. Earl Weaver has not licensed his name to the product, making the game a spiritual successor to the original. It was released on iTunes Store on March 23, 2009.

== Gameplay ==
Gameplay screenshot

The game utilizes the engine of the unreleased 2.1 version of Earl Weaver Baseball II. The game will allow both manage-only modes and an "action" mode, and multiplayer online gameplay. Games can be played in several ways: the original Earl Weaver Baseball's single camera style, Earl Weaver II's multi-camera views, or a 3D "Director". Games can also be simulated a few seconds.

Full leagues and round-robin schedules can be run, but schedules can be run manually by a commissioner. As with the original, players, stadiums and teams can be edited, but by using igiBall software on a personal computer, not on iOS itself.
