= Stronghold (1993 video game) =

- Developer(s): Stormfront Studios
- Publisher(s): Strategic Simulations, Inc.
- Director(s): Don Daglow
- Programmer(s): Cathryn Mataga
- Artist(s): David Bunnett
- Composer(s): Steven Scherer
- Platform(s): MS-DOS, FM Towns, PC-98
- Release: 1993
- Genre(s): City-building game, RTS
- Mode(s): Single-player

Stronghold is a Dungeons & Dragons city-building real-time strategy computer game published by SSI and developed by Stormfront Studios in 1993.

== Gameplay ==
Players balance resources to build a town with unique neighborhoods, each with its own unique architecture. Residents and craftspeople of each neighborhood can be summoned to defend any part of the city that comes under attack. Players can choose from a variety of neighborhood leaders, including Mages, Clerics, Thieves, Fighters, Elves (a combination of fighters and mages), Dwarves (stout fighters who are also great miners), and Halflings (excellent farmers with some thief abilities). Players can use, for example, a spawned Elf to build a building on a plot or the player can focus the elf on training to build up character levels, amass an army and march them overland and defeat a neighboring monster. Or a player can focus entirely on city development and win the game in that way instead. Maps are constructed from triangular wireframe colored tiles. The color of each tile designate the terrain type – water, plains, mountains and hills. The game includes a random map generator.

== Reception ==
James Trunzo reviewed Dungeons & Dragons Stronghold in White Wolf #39 (1994), giving it a final evaluation of "Very Good" and stated that "Stronghold is a long game, and it can grow tedious at times, especially early on when combat is game years away. Players of games like Stronghold have to enjoy the somewhat mundane but exceptionally important aspects of city management. Such decisions, while not exciting, make up the better part of the game. Consider setting the countryside to 'hostile' instead of 'peaceful' if you want more action. Otherwise, bring along a novel, perhaps War and Peace."

According to GameSpy, "cities could quickly become very difficult to manage, but those players who became fans swore that the game was one of the most addictive management simulations they had ever played".
