= Dungeon (video game) =

1975 video game

- Developer: Don Daglow
- Platform: PDP-10
- Release: 1975 or 1976
- Genre: Role-playing

Dungeon was one of the earliest role-playing video games, running on PDP-10 mainframe computers manufactured by Digital Equipment Corporation.

== History ==
Dungeon was written in either 1975 or 1976 by Don Daglow, then a student at Claremont University Center (since renamed Claremont Graduate University). The game was an unlicensed implementation of the new tabletop role-playing game Dungeons & Dragons (D&D) and described the movements of a multi-player party through a monster-inhabited dungeon. Players chose what actions to take in combat and where to move each character in the party, which made the game very slow to play by today's standards. Characters earned experience points and gained skills as their "level" grew, as in D&D, and most of the basic tenets of D&D were reflected.

Daglow wrote in 1988, "In the mid-seventies I had a fully-functioning fantasy role-playing game on the PDP10, with both ranged and melee combat, lines of sight, auto-mapping and NPC's with discrete AI." Although the game was nominally played entirely in text, it was also the first game to employ line of sight graphics displays. Its use of computer graphics consisted of top-down dungeon maps that showed the portions of the playfield the party had seen, allowing for light or darkness, the different "infravision" abilities of elves, dwarves, etc.

This advancement was possible because many university computer terminals had switched by the mid-1970s to CRT screens, which could be refreshed with text in a few seconds instead of a minute or more. Earlier games printed game status for the player on Teletype machines or a line printer, at speeds ranging from 10 to 30 characters per second.

While Dungeon was widely available via DECUS, it was picked up by fewer universities and systems in the mid-1970s than Daglow's earlier Star Trek video game had been in 1971, primarily because it took a then-significant 36K of system RAM versus 32K for Star Trek. Many schools viewed games as gimmicks to interest students in computers, but wanted only small, fast-play examples to minimize games' actual use to reserve time for math and science research and student use. As a result, the early-1970s' maximum size of 32K that many schools set as a limit on games had been downgraded on some campuses to as little as 16K.

Years later (ca. 1980) DECUS distributed another game named Dungeon, that was in fact a version of Zork, a text adventure game that would later become the model for early MUDs.

A third game called Dungeon was released on PLATO in 1975, by John Daleske, Gary Fritz, Jan Good, Bill Gammel, and Mark Nakada.
