= Utopia (1982 video game) =

1982 video game

- North American Intellivision box art by Jerrol Richardson
- Developer: Mattel Electronics
- Publisher: Mattel Electronics
- Designer: Don Daglow
- Programmer: Don Daglow
- Artists: Kai Tran; Don Daglow
- Platforms: Intellivision, Mattel Aquarius
- Release: Intellivision: June 3, 1982; Aquarius: 1983
- Genres: Strategy, city-building
- Modes: Single-player, multiplayer

Utopia is a 1982 strategy video game developed and published by Mattel Electronics for the Intellivision. Designed and programmed by Don Daglow, it is often regarded as one of the first city-building games. With its timed turns mechanic, it has been referred to as "arguably the earliest ancestor of the real-time strategy genre." It was ported by Mattel to its Aquarius computer in 1983, and was later re-released on Microsoft's Game Room service for Xbox 360 and Games for Windows Live in 2010.

== Gameplay ==
In-game screenshot

Utopia is a two-player game in which the two players each control one of the two islands. It lacks an AI opponent, although a single player can play to achieve a high score and ignore the other island. When starting the game, the players may choose how many rounds to play (up to 50) and the length of each round (30 to 120 seconds). The winner is the player with the most points at the end of the game.

Each player rules their own island and uses the controller disc to move a rectangular cursor around the screen. Both players spend gold bars to construct different buildings (houses, schools, factories, hospitals and forts), plant crops, build fishing boats or PT boats, or to fund rebel activity on the enemy island. As each island's population grows, the ruler is responsible for housing their people, feeding their populace and keeping them happy, or else risk rebel activity, which decreases the player's score and sometimes destroys buildings. Income is produced when randomly generated rain clouds, (and sometimes hurricanes) pass over a player's farms, when a fishing boat is positioned over a school of fish, and at the end of each round, based on the player's factory output and fishing boats.

Most rounds consist of constructing a building, then continuously maneuvering the player's fishing boat over a moving school of fish in order to maintain fishing income, with occasional interruptions to construct new buildings whenever they are affordable. Alternatively, a player might spend resources and time maneuvering a PT boat to try and sink their opponent's fishing boat in order to keep their income down. Game algorithms generate and determine the course of rain clouds, tropical storms, hurricanes, schools of fish, and pirate ships.

== Reception ==
A December 1982 review in Games magazine called Utopia a "unique game".

== Legacy ==
GameSpy included Utopia in its Hall of Fame in 2004, commenting: "Considering the state of home video-game technology in 1981, Utopia is an astonishingly detailed simulation." GameSpot featured Utopia in its series Unsung Heroes: Ground Breaking Games, calling it a "surprisingly complex game (often referred to as 'Civilization 0.5') [that] laid the foundation for PC sim classics such as Civilization and SimCity." In 2012, Utopia has been included in the Smithsonian Institution's "The Art of Video Games" exhibition.

Ars Technica cites Utopia as being the "birth of a genre", that "prior to the mid-1990s strategy games were turn based", the "idea of adding a real-time element to force players into instant, impulsive decisions were virtually unheard of." Ars Technica states that it is "arguably the earliest ancestor of the real-time strategy genre". GameSpy described it as the earliest turn-based strategy game with timed turns. Matt Barton and Bill Loguidice say it "helped set the template for the real-time strategy genre", but has "more in common with SimCity than it does with Dune II and later RTS games." Brett Weiss argues that "[m]ost experts consider Utopia" to be "the first real-time strategy game."

In July 2010, the game was re-released on Microsoft's Game Room service for Xbox 360 and Games for Windows Live. A remake of the game has been announced exclusively for the Intellivision Amico.
