= Earl Weaver Baseball II =

1991 sports video game

- Publisher: Electronic Arts
- Platform: MS-DOS
- Release: 1991
- Genre: Sports

Earl Weaver Baseball II is a sports video game for MS-DOS compatible operating systems published by Electronic Arts in 1991. It is the sequel to the 1987 game Earl Weaver Baseball.

== Gameplay ==
Earl Weaver Baseball II is the sequel to the 1987 original with many improvements, including the first full 3D camera that would render a television-style viewing experience. This was made possible by a design decision Dombrower made at Mattel to use a 3D model of the game from the get-go in anticipation of this eventuality. However, the game was released prematurely by Electronic Arts, and Version 1.1, which fixed many of the small bugs that ruined some of its reputation, was never released. In 1992, a version of EWB2 was developed in conjunction with STATS, Inc., that would play back real baseball games using the EWB II display engine and live scoring information from each ballpark, but it was never finished or released. It was only released for MS-DOS.

== Reception ==
Peter Scisco for Compute! said "a brighter spring training for all PC baseball players."

Joseph McCullough for Computer Games Strategy Plus said "In all, Earl Weaver II does not live up to its pre-release hype. Instead of being a revolutionary rewrite with vastly improved graphics, statistics and manager options, Earl Weaver II is simply a mildly improved version of Weaver 1.5."

Computer Gaming World said "In short, Earl Weaver Baseball II is not simply an upgrade, it is a complete redesign. It offers something new and improved for both casual and dedicated gamers, both statistical buffs and action fanatics. Earl Weaver Baseball II is a definite contender."

Computer Gaming World in 1991 denounced Earl Weaver Baseball II as "herky-jerky, funhouse-mirror baseball ... a field-of-nightmares experience". The magazine stated that the sequel had ruined the original's attractive ballparks with "cancerous growths of looming grandstands", less information was available when planning strategy, the automated camera director was poorly implemented, and many features in the original game were now on the optional Commissioner's Disk. Bugs included assigning Connie Mack and John McGraw to the wrong leagues and a conversion utility for player disks that failed on an Electronic Arts-produced disk from 1990.
