= HP-Interex =

Hewlett-Packard computer users association

HP-Interex EMEA Logo

Interex EMEA was the EMEA HP Users Organisation, representing the user community of Hewlett-Packard computers.

The Connect User Group Community, formed from the consolidation in May, 2008 of Interex EMEA, Encompass, and ITUG, was the Hewlett-Packard’s largest user community representing more than 50,000 participants.

== Overview ==
The group was organised by NUGs (National User Groups, by country) and SIGs (Special Interest Groups, by product).

It organised seminars, training, information exchange, as well as international travel to IT events. They intended to independently inform their users community and help them to get the maximum from their investments. Their mission was to facilitate the usage of HP-UX, OpenVMS, Tru64 UNIX, NonStop Kernel & Linux on servers & networks produced and supported by Hewlett-Packard.

The HP-Interex user groups had no direct affiliations with Hewlett-Packard, but they tried to collaborate with HP to provide their users with an optimum support and they gave feedback about potential future OS content, and users' issues.

The group members were mainly IT managers, system managers, system administrators, application development managers and consultants and promoted the exchange of information and experience between the members, HP and its partners.

In general HP-Interex stimulated the IT - business alignment.

Membership advantages were the following:

- Access to the group activities
- Reduction for training
- Communication channel with Hewlett-Packard Management
- Join the OpenVMS Hobbyist license project, allowing to run OpenVMS using a free license for private non-profit hobby usage.
- Interact and partner with other members of the organisation
- Gather and distribute information via its web sites and support and discussion forums.

== Groups ==
Related groups were: DECUS, Compaq Users Organisation (CUO), Encompass, ITUG.

Some early and well-known members of DECUS were the late Terry Shannon and John R. Wisniewski.

== History ==
Originally the users group was called DECUS, at the time Digital Equipment Corporation conducted its business in the 1960s - 1990s.

When Compaq acquired Digital in 1998, the users group was baptised as the Compaq Users Organisation (CUO).

Finally, when Hewlett-Packard acquired Compaq in 2002, CUO was renamed as HP-Interex, although there were still DECUS groups in Germany. In the USA, the organisation was represented by the Encompass and ITUG organisation. In 2008, as the result of the merger of multiple related user groups, it got a new name as the Connect user group.

== See also ==
- Connect (users group)
- Digital Equipment Corporation
- Compaq
- Hewlett-Packard
- Tandem Computers
