= Shark! Shark! =

1982 video game

- Developer(s): Mattel; BBG Entertainment
- Publisher(s): Mattel; BBG Entertainment
- Designer(s): Don Daglow
- Programmer(s): Ji-Wen Tsao
- Composer(s): Andy Sells
- Platform(s): Intellivision, Windows, Mac, Nintendo Switch, Xbox, PlayStation
- Release: NA: December 6, 1982; EU: 1982; Modern version September 28, 2023
- Genre(s): Action, Shooting, Shoot ’em up
- Mode(s): Single-player, multiplayer

Shark! Shark! is an Intellivision game originally designed by Don Daglow, and with additional design and programming by Ji-Wen Tsao, one of the first female game programmers in the history of video games. The player is a fish who must eat smaller fish in order to gain points and extra lives while avoiding enemies such as larger fish, sharks, jellyfish, lobsters and crabs. After eating a certain number of fish, the player's fish grows in size and is thus able to eat a larger selection of fish. However, while the larger fish becomes a bit faster, it is less agile than the small fish and has a harder time avoiding enemies.

Shark! Shark! was originally considered by Mattel to be a cute game for kids and unlikely to make strong inroads into the gaming community. The game was unexpectedly popular, forcing Mattel to quickly manufacture another batch of cartridges. The original cartridge run was only 5,600 units.

== Reviews ==
The Video Game Update praised the graphics of Shark! Shark! and said the game would be appealing to children, while stating adults would also enjoy the challenge. R. Wayne Schmittberger of Games also praised the graphics, stating the underwater effects were extraordinary.

== Legacy ==
Shark! Shark! was made available for the PlayStation 3 through PlayStation Home in fall 2012 in a collection titled Intellivision Gen2. In addition to players being a fish eating other fish trying try to take down the shark, their food and foes will both swim in a wide variety of new patterns. It was also released on Microsoft's Game Room service for its Xbox 360 console and for Windows-based PCs in May 2010.

A new version of Shark! Shark! was announced for release on the Intellivision Amico video game console. It is one of the six games that were meant to be included with the console. After putting an indefinite halt on development of their Amico console, Intellivision announced that mobile versions of Shark! Shark! would be released as part of the company's Amico Home initiative. With this announcement, a version was made available for Android OS in late 2023, followed by an iOS release in December 2024.

In 2023, BBG Entertainment GmbH acquired the Shark! Shark! trademark, along with the right to port the Intellivision Amico version of Shark! Shark! to Nintendo Switch, Xbox One, Xbox Series X/S, and Windows and Mac computers. These ports were released on September 28 of the same year. Nick Thorpe of Retro Gamer magazine reviewed the new version. In his review, Thorpe stated that the gameplay becomes monotonous over 12 rounds of single-player action, but a well-rounded, albeit limited, assortment of gameplay modes does help. Ultimately, the new version received a 71% score from Retro Gamer.
