= Eddie Dombrower =

American video game designer and programmer (born 1957)

Eddie Dombrower (born 1957) is an American video game designer, programmer, and producer. He co-created the baseball games Earl Weaver Baseball and Intellivision World Series Baseball. He also designed the first dance notation computer software, DOM.

== Career ==
Dombrower studied dance and mathematics at Pomona College in Claremont, California. After graduating, he considered the possibility that the new microcomputer technology might provide a method by which choreography could be annotated and recorded for display in animated graphic form. He created the "DOM (for the first three letters of his surname) system" on an Apple II computer in 1981/1982. It allowed choreographers to use a system of codes to record their work. The resulting dance movements were then displayed by a figure on screen.

In 1982, Intellivision game design director Don Daglow (also a Pomona College graduate) recruited Dombrower to join Mattel to work on a new type of baseball game that, for the first time, would feature large on-screen animated figures and multiple camera angles. Earlier video games all showed a static or scrolling playfield viewed from a single camera angle, and Daglow believed that Dombrower's experience with DOM would help achieve the desired results. Dombrower made progress, and Intellivision World Series Baseball's new design launched a campaign during the Christmas television advertising season in 1982. Although the title had limited distribution due to the video game crash of 1983, it proved that video games could mimic television coverage of sports events, and soon other sports games adopted the same style.

In 1986, Daglow, then working at Electronic Arts, sought out Dombrower once again. EA Founder Trip Hawkins had agreed to back the creation of another baseball game, Earl Weaver Baseball. As they had done at Intellivision, Daglow created the baseball simulation and overall look, while Dombrower designed the game's visual presentation and its underlying technology. Hall of Fame manager Earl Weaver worked with the team to design the game's artificial intelligence by providing contributing his strategic knowledge of baseball. When the game appeared in 1987, it was named one of the 25 best games of all time by Computer Gaming World.

Dombrower also led the development of the sequel, Earl Weaver Baseball II.

Dombrower developed EWB Baseball for the iPhone, the spiritual successor to the Earl Weaver series, which was released on March 23, 2009.
