= The Legend of Alon D'ar =

2001 video game

- Developer: Stormfront Studios
- Publisher: Ubi Soft
- Writer: Christy Marx
- Engine: Stormfront Studios
- Platform: PlayStation 2
- Release: NA: December 5, 2001
- Genre: Action role-playing game
- Modes: Single-player, Multiplayer

The Legend of Alon D'ar is an action role-playing game developed by Stormfront Studios and published by Ubi Soft for PlayStation 2 in 2001.

== Gameplay ==
The game plays somewhat like the Final Fantasy series' Active Time Battle, with the player having to wait certain time for their turn. What makes this system different from ATB is that actions take different amounts of time based on the weapon or ability used, for example an axe will need more time than a dagger to attack. Different weapons can be improved by spending experience points as save stones to level up traits unique to that class of weapon, such as speed, damage and block. New traits must be bought with gold at certain save stones. Each trait can be leveled up 6 times and once all traits are maxed out, one extra level is unlocked to make that weapon more devastating.

Weapons, items, and spells must be equipped to a character in order to be used in (and in the case of items and certain spells outside) of battle, ten slots in total. Each character also has a unique ability that is always equipped to the bottom of the list. There are also 4 armor and accessory slots for each character. The game features a vast world to explore; there are several towns and a variety of monsters to combat. The game also features multi-player experience after unlocking the second character in the story.

There are several types of spells like Water, Earth, Sound etc. that are stored in Orbs. These Orbs can be leveled up to unlock more spells or make the unlocked ones more powerful. As with weapons, the player can spend points to unlock new spells for each element or to upgrade existing spells. Spells are always cast automatically but can leave a character vulnerable to attack.

== Plot ==
The plot revolves around the main character Jarik. At the start of the game, his village is attacked and his home burned to the ground. The attacking force appears to be an army of Dagani, but Jarik alone realizes that they are actually shapeshifters taking the form of Dagani so they may incite a war between them and the humans. After a strange vision, an odd mark is burned into his hand, which the village elder identifies as a mystic sigil. Jarik sets out to discover the origin of this symbol and prevent war from destroying his homeland. In his travels he strikes up an uneasy partnership with the mistrusting Dagani Tahir and after helping Tahir set the soul of his brother to rest, the two eventually grow to a deep trust. Soon after Jarik is visited by the spirits of heroes past and learns that the mystic sigil gives him the power to transform into the terrifying Juggernaut. They continue the fight to the Kemerarr Highlands where they meet the outcast Tylonee and her dragon guardian Yi. Tylonee agrees to join the party in the hopes of vanquishing a great evil so she can be forgiven for her crimes and return to her homeland. The final member of the crew is Sundeep, a mage and a member of the lizard-like Sarojin. The team saves him from a dark cave where he was held captive, as Sarojin become weaker the longer they don't bask in sunlight. Freeing him allows the team to use his ability to teleport to previous areas.

== Development ==
The game was originally scheduled to be released in November 2001.

== Critical reception ==
Reception

Aggregate score
Aggregator	Score
Metacritic	43/100

Review scores
Publication	Score
Game Informer	5/10
GameSpot	3.5/10
GameSpy	35%
GameZone	4.5/10
IGN	4.3/10
Next Generation	2/5
Official U.S. PlayStation Magazine	1.5/5
RPGFan	71%

The game received "generally unfavorable reviews" according to the review aggregation website Metacritic. Jeff Lundrigan of NextGen said in an early review, "Few things are more tedious than a 'sprawling RPG' without any real wit, style, or engaging characters. But Alon D'ar is just such a beast."
