= Digital News =

Defunct computer newspaper

Digital News was a trade publication that focused on products from Digital Equipment Corporation (DEC).

== History ==
They published independently from 1986 thru 1992. At that point, they were acquired and merged with Digital Review with the new title Digital News & Review. DEC product news and reviews from Sonny Monosson, which were featured on the Digital Business pages of Digital News were retained in the pages of Digital News & Reviews.

The Boston Globe had described the situation between the prior publication owners as "The war among the Digitals: Bitter competition reflects growing rivalry between Ziff, McGovern empires." The combined Digital News & Review periodical was printed from 1992 to 1996 by Reed Business Information.

=== Hardcopy (magazine) ===
In 1988, Digital News acquired 1980-founded Hardcopy magazine (stylized HARDCOPY). At the time, International Data Group Ziff Davis published "a third DEC-users journal, Boston-based Digital Review." The DEC Professional was the fourth player.
