= Return to Atlantis (video game) =

1988 video game

- Publisher(s): Electronic Arts
- Platform(s): Amiga
- Release: 1988
- Genre(s): Action-adventure

Return to Atlantis is a 1988 video game published by Electronic Arts for the Amiga.

== Gameplay ==
Return to Atlantis is a game in which the player character goes on missions to help protect the ocean. The player plays the role of Indiana Cousteau, proclaimed as a hero of the oceans.

== Development ==
Return to Atlantis was announced for the Commodore Amiga in late 1985. It was one of the first titles announced for the platform. The game was marked by a long development time and delays. The art was produced by Mike Wallace. It arrived two years after being announced.

== Reception ==
Douglas Seacat reviewed the game for Computer Gaming World, and stated that "All in all, Return to Atlantis is a game which offers mixed signals."
