= Encompass =

Hewlett-Packard group

Encompass, the Enterprise Computing Association, was the original computer user group for business customers of Hewlett-Packard. Encompass's history began with DECUS, founded in 1961, for customers of the Digital Equipment Corporation, which was acquired in 1998 by Compaq. The U.S. Chapter incorporated as the user group Encompass U.S.

Hewlett-Packard acquired Compaq in 2002. Encompass continued as an HP user group, aimed at business customers of all of HP's hardware, software, and services.

The Encompass mission was to promote technical information exchange among its members and between the members and Hewlett-Packard.

The Connect User Group Community, formed from the consolidation in May 2008 of Encompass, Interex EMEA, and ITUG is Hewlett-Packard's largest user community representing more than 50,000 participants. See Connect (users group) for more information.

The Encompass Board at the time of the consolidation consisted of Nina Buik, Kristi Browder, Glen Kuykendall, Anthony Ioele, Steve Davidek, Dena Wright, John Maynen, Clyde Poole, and Bill Johnson. Two former directors were credited with being instrumental in facilitating the consolidation, Chris Koppe and Jim Becker.

== Mission ==
Encompass partnered with first Compaq and then Hewlett-Packard on national technical conferences (in the U.S.):

- CETS 2001 (Compaq Enterprise Technical Symposium): September 10–14, 2001, Anaheim, California
- HP-ETS 2002 (HP Enterprise Technical Symposium): October 7–11, St. Louis, Missouri
- HP World 2003: August 11–15, 2003, Atlanta, Georgia, in partnership with Interex as well as HP
- HP World 2004: August 16–20, 2004, Chicago, Illinois, in partnership with Interex and HP
- HP Technology Forum 2005: October 17–20, 2005, Orlando, Florida, in partnership with the user group OpenView Forum International as well as HP
- HP Technology Forum 2006: September 17–21, 2006, Houston, Texas, in partnership with HP, ITUG, and OpenView Forum International
- HP Technology Forum & Expo 2007: June 17–21, 2007, Las Vegas, Nevada, in partnership with HP and ITUG

Encompass also had a number of Local User Groups (LUGs) throughout the U.S., and Special Interest Groups (SIGs) on various topics.

Encompass also ran webcasts, local seminars, and other programs.

Encompass manages the pre-conference seminar program and trade show at the HP Technology Forum & Expo.

Non-U.S. Encompass organizations include:

- Encompass Canada
- Encompass New Zealand
- Encompass Australia

== See also ==
Connect (users group)
