= Earl Weaver Baseball =

1987 video game

- Developers: Don Daglow; Eddie Dombrower
- Publisher: Electronic Arts
- Platforms: Amiga, Apple II, MS-DOS
- Release: 1987
- Genre: Sports
- Modes: Single-player, multiplayer

Earl Weaver Baseball is a baseball video game designed by Don Daglow and Eddie Dombrower and published in 1987 by Electronic Arts. The artificial intelligence for the computer manager was provided by Baseball Hall of Fame member Earl Weaver, then manager of the Baltimore Orioles, based on a lengthy series of interviews. EWB was a major hit, and along with John Madden Football helped pave the way for the EA Sports brand, which launched in 1992. A Sega Genesis version was planned, but cancelled.

== Gameplay ==
Amiga screenshot

Earl Weaver Baseball was the first commercial computer sports game to allow players to simulate an entire season without showing each game play-by-play on the screen. The Amiga version featured voice synthesis, a first in a sports computer game. Unlike baseball games released since, names were represented phonetically, so that even custom-created players could be announced by the synthesized voice. For the first time, different stadiums were shown graphically on the screen, with gameplay adjusted for their actual dimensions. Defunct or demolished stadiums were included, such as the Polo Grounds (New York), Griffith Stadium (Washington, D.C.), Ebbets Field (Brooklyn, New York), and Sportsman's Park (St. Louis).

== Reception ==
Earl Weaver Baseball was very successful for EA. Computer Gaming World in 1987 called the game "undoubtedly the most exciting sports simulations to be released in years". It praised the game's graphics and audio, and noted its extensive offensive and defensive options. In 1988, the magazine noted that "wind, ball and player speed, and playing surface can all affect a given play's result. To offer all this and the ability to play in both strategy/action and strategy only mode is simply awesome". Game reviewers Hartley and Patricia Lesser complimented the game in their "The Role of Computers" column in Dragon #126 (1987), calling it "the finest computer simulation for baseball we’ve ever seen" and "impressive beyond belief". The Lessers reviewed the IBM version of the game in the following issue (#127), and gave the game 4½ stars. They later reviewed the Commodore Amiga version in 1988 in Dragon #132, giving it 5 out of 5 stars. Compute! also praised Earl Weaver Baseball, stating that the Amiga version "is, without question, the closest we have to the ideal computer baseball game ... If you are a baseball fan, you will want this game. Period". Jerry Pournelle wrote "the only problem the game has is that you'll spend half your life playing it. I know my kids have". Recommending it to "baseball fanatics", he said "you can painlessly learn more about baseball strategy from Earl Weaver Baseball than from a dozen books on the subject". Mike Siggins reviewed Earl Weaver Baseball for Games International magazine, and gave it 5 stars out of 5, and stated that "Earl Weaver Baseball is an excellent game offering much, much more than a stats based replay and should be a required purchase for baseball fans."

Computer Gaming World named Earl Weaver Baseball its game of year for 1987, and in 1989 it named Earl Weaver Baseball to its Hall of Fame for games readers rated highly over time, with a score of 8.82 out of 12. In 1996, the magazine named Earl Weaver Baseball the 25th Best Game of All Time for IBM PC compatibles.

== Legacy ==
A sequel, Earl Weaver Baseball II, was released in 1991. In 2002, Dombrower released a version called I Got It Baseball as shareware, where the player can only manage, not participate. The 2009 iOS game EWB Baseball is also based on Earl Weaver Baseball II.
