= Ed Del Castillo =

American video game designer

Edward Alexander Del Castillo
- Citizenship: USA
- Known for: Founder, Executive President, and Chief Creative Officer of Liquid Entertainment.

Edward Del Castillo is the Founder, Executive President, and Chief Creative Officer of Liquid Entertainment.

== Career ==
=== Origin Systems ===
Prior to founding Liquid, he served as Senior Producer for Lord British Studios and Firaxis within Origin Systems. There he created, developed, and produced the first three-dimensional Ultima game, advised on Ultima Online, and produced Sid Meier's Gettysburg!. Within Lord British Studios, he pioneered and managed the transition from two dimensional gaming to three dimensions, including creating the design, art and code pipelines necessary to transition the entire department from two- to three-dimensional gaming.

=== Westwood Studios ===
Prior to his work at Origin, Del Castillo worked at Westwood Studios, where he served as the producer on the original Command & Conquer: Tiberian Dawn, and Red Alert, along with several expansions, ports, and other projects. On Command & Conquer and Red Alert, he was the primary creative and managerial force responsible for the creation, design, and production of all aspects of these titles. Under his supervision, these genre creating titles went on to become some of the most well awarded titles in gaming history. Del Castillo's deep understanding of game design has led him to be well published throughout the industry.

=== Liquid Entertainment ===
As founder, president and chief creative officer of Liquid Entertainment, Del Castillo's first game was Battle Realms, published by Crave Entertainment and Ubisoft in November 2001 to critical acclaim. Battle Realms is a real-time strategy PC game for Windows that features an unconventional approach to resource management and unit development. It was well received by reviewers, many of whom praised its state-of-the-art 3D engine and East Asian-inspired setting and aesthetics. It was nominated Best PC Strategy game of 2002 by The Academy of Interactive Arts & Sciences, and was chosen for Computer Gaming World's Top 10 Games of E3 2001. Liquid Entertainment has since released multiple next-gen console titles and also mobile, social and casual games to critical success in its 15+ years in business. These titles include intellectual properties of The Lord of the Rings, ABC's Desperate Housewives, Marvel Comics' Thor and the Dungeons & Dragons series.

At the end of 2014, Ed reduced the size of Liquid Entertainment. Liquid continued as an IP holding company and consultancy that benefitted from its games that were available online.

=== Current Work ===
In 2016 Ed became the COO of HERO Digital Entertainment, a joint venture funded by India company, JetSynthesys.

Beginning in 2018, Ed became a full-time consultant. He offers management advice on production methodologies.

== Personal life ==
He holds a bachelor's degree in economics from the University of California, San Diego with a double minor in Visual Arts and Psychology. He has two sons with his wife, Carmen.

== Games developed ==
- The Keys to Maramon (1990), published by Mindcraft Software, Inc.
- Siege (1992), published by Mindcraft Software, Inc.
- Tegel's Mercenaries (1992), published by Mindcraft Software, Inc.
- Strike Squad (1993), published by Mindcraft Software, Inc.
- Bloodstone: An Epic Dwarven Tale (1993), published by Mindcraft Software, Inc.
- Ambush at Sorinor (1993), published by Mindcraft Software, Inc.
- Command & Conquer (1995), published by Virgin Interactive Entertainment (Europe) Ltd.
- Command & Conquer: Red Alert (1996), published by Virgin Interactive Entertainment (Europe) Ltd.
- Command & Conquer: The Covert Operations (1996), published by Virgin Interactive Entertainment (Europe) Ltd.
- Command & Conquer (Special Gold Edition) (1997), published by Virgin Interactive Entertainment (Europe) Ltd.
- Command & Conquer: Red Alert - Counterstrike (1997), published by Virgin Interactive Entertainment (Europe) Ltd.
- Westwood Studios 10th Anniversary Collection (1996), published by Virgin Interactive Entertainment (Europe) Ltd.
- Sid Meier's Gettysburg! (1997), published by Electronic Arts, Inc.
- Sid Meier's Alpha Centauri (1999), published by Electronic Arts, Inc.
- Ultima IX: Ascension (1999), published by Electronic Arts
- Battle Realms (2001), published by Crave Entertainment and Ubisoft
- Battle Realms: Winter of the Wolf (2002), published by Crave Entertainment and Ubisoft
- The Lord of the Rings: War of the Ring (2003), published by Sierra Entertainment
- Dungeons & Dragons: Dragonshard (2005), published by Atari
- Desperate Housewives: The Game (2006), published by Buena Vista Games
- Rise of the Argonauts (2008), published by Codemasters
- Thor: God of Thunder (2011), published by SEGA
- Deadline Hollywood: The Game (2012), published by Paramount Digital Entertainment
- Instant Jam: Facebook (2012), published by GarageGames
- Dungeons & Dragons: Heroes of Neverwinter (2012), published by Atari
- Karateka (video game) (2012), published by Karateka, LLC
- Cuddle Pets (2013), published by Digital Capital
- Paper Galaxy (2014), published by Liquid Entertainment, LLC
- Max Steel (2014), published by Mattel
- Battle Realms: Zen Edition (2025), self published
