= Lennie Moore =

American composer

- Genres: Video game music, film scores, multimedia
- Occupations: Composer, conductor, arranger
- Years active: 1988–present

Lennie Moore is an American composer and conductor of music for video games, film, television, and multimedia.

== Biography ==
Moore is best known as the composer of the 1999 video game Outcast, and most recently, the Watchmen Motion Comic episodic web series. He has composed music on ten films, orchestrated for other composers on dozens of feature films and television movies, over 125 commercials, in addition to many video games including Outcast (2000 nominee for Best Music by the Academy of Interactive Arts & Sciences), Magic the Gathering: Duel of the Planeswalkers, Dirty Harry (unreleased), Dragonshard, The Lord of the Rings: War of the Ring, and additional music for Snoopy vs. the Red Baron and The Chronicles of Narnia: Prince Caspian. Lennie recently won a G.A.N.G. Award for the Watchmen Motion Comic web series. He also teaches as an adjunct professor at the San Francisco Conservatory of Music in the Technology and Applied composition program.

== Notable compositions ==
The following list consists of select projects for which Lennie Moore wrote the score or contributed additional music.

=== Video game scores ===
- Outcast: A New Beginning (2024)
- Rising Storm 2: Vietnam (2017)
- Outcast: Second Contact (2017)
- Star Wars: Battlefront II (2017, Additional Music)
- Call of Duty: WWII (2017, Additional Music)
- Dota 2 (2016, The International 2016 Music Pack)
- Counter Strike: Global Offensive (2015, Additional Music)
- Halo 2: Anniversary (2014)
- Rising Storm (2013)
- Star Wars: The Old Republic (2011)
- Kinect Disneyland Adventures (2011)
- Halo: Combat Evolved Anniversary (2011)
- Magic the Gathering: Duel of the Planeswalkers (2009)
- Sonic and the Black Knight (2009, Additional Music)
- The Chronicles of Narnia: Prince Caspian (2008, Additional Music)
- Dirty Harry (2007, unreleased)
- Snoopy vs. the Red Baron (2006, Additional Music)
- Dragonshard (2005)
- Plague of Darkness (2004, unreleased)
- The Lord of the Rings: War of the Ring (2003)
- Outcast (1999)

=== Film scores ===
- TV Virus (2007, Composer, additional cues)
- The Ride (1997, Composer)
- Teddy & Philomina (1996, Composer)
- Raw Justice (1994, Co-composer)
- Silent Victim (1993, Additional Music)

=== Television scores ===
- Watchmen Motion Comic, Warner Premiere, iTunes TV Series (2008–2009)
- Women: Stories of Passion – Hat Trick (1997)
- House of Style:Swimsuit '94, MTV (1994)
- Dead at 21: Pilot Episode, MTV (1994)
- Dead at 21: Love Minus Zero, MTV (1994)
- Dead at 21: Brain Salad, MTV (1994)
- MTV Sports: The Movie, MTV (1994)

=== Concerti ===
- AWAKEN for EVI and Strings
- Metal Gear Solid arrangement for Video Games Live (Composed by Harry Gregson Williams)
- Interactive Frogger arrangement for Video Games Live

=== Album credits ===
- The Greatest Songs of the 60's, Barry Manilow (Orchestrator for Ken Berry)
- Dark New Day, Dark New Day (Music Prep/Conductor)
- The Greatest Songs of the 50's, Barry Manilow (Orchestrator for Ken Berry)
- Sugo Latin Jazz 6 CD Project, Sugo Records (Arranger|Album Producer)
- Voices, Continuum (Album Co-Producer)
- Ultimate Romance, Inner Dimension (Arranger)
- Indigo Christmas II, Sugo Records (Arranger)
- Trinity and Beyond: The Atomic Bomb Movie, VCE (Additional Music Composer)
- Off The Beaten Path, Dave Koz (String Arrangements)
- Continuum, Continuum (Album Co-Producer)
- Sometimes y, Sometimes y (Album Co-Producer)

== Awards ==
- Watchmen Motion Comic (2009) (G.A.N.G. Awards, Best Audio – Other)

=== Award nominations (excluding wins) ===
- Outcast (2000) (Best Music, Academy of Interactive Arts and Sciences Interactive Achievement Awards)

== See also ==
- Watchmen (animated film)
- Outcast (game)
- Video game music
- List of soundtrack composers
- List of film score composers
