= The Magic Candle =

1989 video game

- Developer: Mindcraft
- Publisher: Mindcraft
- Platforms: Apple II, Commodore 64, MS-DOS, PC-98
- Release: 1989
- Genre: Role-playing
- Mode: Single-player

The Magic Candle: Volume 1 is a role-playing video game designed by Ali Atabek and developed and published by Mindcraft in 1989.

== Plot ==
Players must assemble a group of six adventurers and journey across the kingdom of Deruvia to keep the demon Dreax imprisoned in the eponymous magic candle, which has begun to melt. The game's world includes several towns and cities, two castles, and several dungeons and towers. Unlike many computer games, one wins not by defeating a final enemy, but by collecting the necessary items and learning the necessary chants in order to preserve the magic candle. Players begin with one adventurer, a human hero called Lukas. Additional adventurers can be found in the game's two castles. Much of The Magic Candle's fun derives from discovering exactly what is needed to preserve the eponymous candle. However, if the candle melts and Dreax escapes, there is no consequence.

== Gameplay ==
=== Races ===
- Dwarves - very short but exceptionally strong.
- Elves - tall and slender with special attachment to the forests.
- Halflings - small charismatic race with large furry feet.
- Man - or Human.
- Wizards - wizards are considered a race in this game. This race is similar to the race of Man, but practices magic.

=== Professions ===
- Carpenter - can build shelter for camping. Can work in town.
- Fighter - skilled in combat.
- Gem-Cutter - gain extra 1/3 profits from gem sales. Can work in town.
- Knight - skilled both in combat and in defense.
- Mage - skilled in Magic. Only Wizards can be mages.
- Mercenary - offer their services for hire.
- Metal Smith - repairs weapons faster. Can work in town.
- Ranger - good hunters and move well in unknown terrain. This is Lukas' profession.
- Tailor - can make and repair garments. Can work in town.

=== Realism ===
The Magic Candle has several traits that increase the realism of the game and of the world of Deruvia:

- Party splitting - players can split their party into several different groups and have each of them perform a different task, including working at different jobs to earn money in a town.
- Wear and tear - weapons accumulate wear and tear, and even break if not maintained properly.
- Hunger and fatigue - characters need to eat, rest, and sleep in order to remain healthy.
- Residences - players cannot go barging into a private home. They have to knock on the door, and know the name of the residence owner.
- Time factor - shops close during the night and re-open at dawn. NPCs can be in different places at different times of the day.
- Respawn - once a district is cleared of patrols, it stays so till replaced, at a rate of 3 times a year. Towers and dungeons do not get replacement guards.

== Ports ==
Japanese company StarCraft, which specialized in localizing Western CRPGs, ported The Magic Candle to the Japanese PC-9801 computer. The port was released in May 1991, two years after the original release, with completely redesigned art and interfaces.

== Reception ==
James V. Trunzo reviewed The Magic Candle in White Wolf #17 (1989) and stated that "Magic Candle seems to offer the best of the old with a refreshing dash of the new, and both novice and veteran gamers should enjoy the challenge presented by this new release from Mindcraft."

The Magic Candle was reviewed in 1989 in Dragon #148 by Hartley, Patricia, and Kirk Lesser in "The Role of Computers" column. The reviewers gave the game 3 out of 5 stars. Scorpia of Computer Gaming World in 1989 gave the game a very positive review, noting that killed monsters tend to stay dead, a welcome change from the "endless wave" of other CRPGs. Criticisms included the relatively slow combat and the inability to quickly find people or shops in town. The magazine later recognized it as 1989's Role-Playing Game of the Year, describing it as "extensive, well-written, and balanced". In 1993 Scorpia approved of the "superior nonviolent ending" and stated that the 1989 award was well-deserved.

Scorpia in 1993 was more critical of The Magic Candle III, with objections including a shortage of money at the start forcing the player to grind instead of questing, and imbalanced dungeons. She concluded that it "is a dull game" which failed to meet the expectations the first one set, "only for the hard-core fan of the series", and ended the series "on a mediocre note".

The editors of Game Player's PC Strategy Guide gave The Magic Candle their 1989 "Best PC Fantasy Role-Playing Game" award. They wrote that "richly inventive, smoothly playable, filled with user-friendly attention to detail, The Magic Candle stands out dramatically in a very crowded field".

== Legacy ==
The Magic Candle was successful enough to have sequels: The Magic Candle II: The Four and Forty (1991), and The Magic Candle III (1992). The Keys to Maramon (1990) was an action-title spin-off. Bloodstone: An Epic Dwarven Tale, released in 1993, is a prequel to The Magic Candle. The series also spawned two spin-offs: Siege (1992) and its sequel Ambush at Sorinor (1993) are tactical strategy games, both taking place in the world of The Magic Candle.
