= Walls of Rome (video game) =

1993 video game

- Developer: Mindcraft
- Publisher: Action Sixteen
- Platform: MS-DOS
- Release: 1993
- Genre: Strategy

Walls of Rome is a strategy video game developed by Mindcraft and published for MS-DOS in 1993 by Action Sixteen. It is set in the Roman Empire and focuses on siege warfare.

== Plot ==
Walls of Rome is a tactical wargame featuring siege warfare set in the era of the Roman Empire. The player can be either the attacker or defender as part of a siege assault against a fortification. Each side can utilize an assortment of weapons, troops, and techniques from various historical ancient civilizations and time periods. The player can also design scenarios and can play them or trade with other players who own the game.

== Development ==
Walls of Rome uses an improved version of the game engine employed by Mindcraft's previous game, Siege (1992). The game was designed by Ali Atabek, Scott Baker, Paul Kellner, and James Thomas, with Kellner also serving as the project coordinator and Thomas as the lead programmer. The game featured art by Scott Baker, Steve Beam, Steve Burke, and Juan L. Galceran.

== Reception ==
In 1994, Computer Gaming World stated that Walls of Rome "vastly improved" on Siege's game engine and AI. The magazine concluded that it "is not only a solid extension of the original Siege engine, it offers loads of replay value as well". The game was reviewed in 1994 in Dragon #207 by Sandy Petersen in the "Eye of the Monitor" column. Petersen gave the game 3 out of 5 stars.

Walls of Rome was a runner-up for Computer Gaming World's Wargame of the Year award in June 1994, losing to Clash of Steel. The editors wrote of the game, "In this sequel to Siege, the AI is less predictable than in the previous releases, the historical research is extremely solid (including many obscure battles that you can't find anywhere else and historical uniforms/banners which are something of a miniaturist's dream), and a multi-player modem capacity that takes the game up another notch in our opinion".
