= Ymir (Marvel Comics) =

Fictional comic character based on mythical frost giant

- Ymir as depicted in Journey into Mystery #98 (November 1963). Art by Jack Kirby.

Publication information
- Publisher: Marvel Comics
- First appearance: Journey into Mystery #97 (October 1963)
- Created by: Stan Lee (Writer); Jack Kirby (Artist)

In-story information
- Species: Ice Giant deity
- Place of origin: Niffleheim
- Team affiliations: Ice Giants
- Partnerships: Surtur
- Notable aliases: Living Winter; Aurgelmir
- Abilities: Superhuman strength, speed, agility, endurance, senses, reflexes, stamina and durability; Frost immunity; Regeneration; Cryokinesis; Immortality

Ymir is a character appearing in American comic books published by Marvel Comics. Created by Stan Lee and Jack Kirby, the character first appeared in Journey into Mystery #97 (October 1963). Ymir is based on the frost giant of the same name from Norse mythology. Ymir is a recurring antagonist of the superhero Thor.

== Publication history ==
Ymir debuted in Journey into Mystery #97 (October 1963), and was created by Stan Lee and Jack Kirby. He appeared in the 2019 Giant-Man series.

== Fictional character biography ==
Ymir was among the first Asgardian creatures to be created by the Asgardian gods. He considers all other forms of life — with the exception of his kin the Frost Giants of Niflheim — to be aberrations that must be destroyed. Ymir was imprisoned in a ring of magical fire by Odin, the king of the Norse gods, while attempting to bring eternal winter to Asgard with the other giants.

Ymir reappears in a two-part storyline in Avengers and Doctor Strange, where he is summoned to Earth alongside the fire demon Surtur by the Sons of Satannish. The pair are defeated and banished after they are tricked into fighting one another. Ymir and Surtur reappear in Thor, and invade Asgard. Both are defeated when Thor banishes them to the other-dimensional Sea of Eternal Night. Ymir reappears in the publication Marvel Super-Heroes, where he and the Frost and Storm Giants attack Asgard before being stopped by Thor and his half-brother Vidar.

Ymir appears in the limited series X-Men: First Class, which is set during the early days of the Marvel universe. The original X-Men encounter a group called the "Sons of the Vanir" who summon Ymir to Earth. After a brief battle, Thor returns Ymir to Niflheim.

Ymir makes another return in the pages of A+X. He has created a replica of the Casket of Ancient Winters and plans to freeze the world before being defeated by Iceman.

== Powers and abilities ==
Ymir is a large frost giant over 1,000 feet (300 m) tall with physical attributes far greater than most others. He possesses superhuman strength and durability. He is able to project intense and deadly cold. Ymir can regenerate from as little as an ice particle. He is also considered to be immortal. Additionally, he wields an enormous icicle that functions as a club.

== Reception ==
=== Critical response ===
Marc Buxton of Den of Geek included Ymir in their "Thor 4: The Marvel Villains We Want to See" list, writing, "Ymir is one of Kirby’s most grandiose creations, a walking, angry glacier fueled by hatred of the Asgardians. The final battle between Frost Giants and Asgard is just an epic waiting to be told, and Ymir could be Thor’s greatest challenge if this conflict comes to fruition."

=== Impact ===
Philip Etemesi of Screen Rant asserted, "It's largely through him that the concept of regeneration is popularized in the Golden Era of comic books. The villain gets killed many times during battles with Asgardians only for his body to regenerate."

== In other media ==
=== Television ===
- Ymir appears in the Spider-Man and His Amazing Friends episode "The Vengeance of Loki", voiced by John Stephenson.
- Ymir appears in The Avengers: Earth's Mightiest Heroes episode "The Fall of Asgard".
- Ymir appears in the Hulk and the Agents of S.M.A.S.H. episode "Hulks on Ice".
- Ymir appears in the Ultimate Spider-Man episode "Contest of Champions".
- Ymir appears in Marvel Super Hero Adventures: Frost Fight!, voiced by Fred Tatasciore.

=== Video games ===
- Ymir appears as a non-playable character in Marvel: Ultimate Alliance, voiced by Paul Eiding.
- Ymir appears as a non-playable character in Thor: God of Thunder, voiced by Mitch Lewis.
- Ymir appears as a non-playable character in Marvel Super Hero Squad Online.
- Ymir appears in Pinball FX 2, voiced by Travis Willingham.
- Ymir appears as a non-playable character in Marvel: Avengers Alliance.
- Ymir appears as a non-playable character in Thor: The Dark World - The Official Game, voiced by Tyler Bunch.
- Ymir appears as a non-playable character in Marvel: Future Fight.
