= The Magic Candle III =

1992 video game

- Cover art by Bruce Eagle
- Developer: Mindcraft
- Publisher: Mindcraft
- Designer: James Thomas
- Composer: Ali Atabek
- Platform: MS-DOS
- Release: 1992
- Genre: Role-playing
- Mode: Single-player

The Magic Candle is a role-playing video game designed by James Thomas and developed and published by Mindcraft in 1992. It is a sequel to The Magic Candle II: The Four and Forty from 1991.

== Gameplay ==
The notepad and party movement mechanics are improved from the previous game.

== Reception ==
Reception

Review scores
| Publication | Score |
|---|---|
| PC Games (DE) | 52/100 |
| Génération 4 | 70% |
| PC Player (DE) | 39/100 |
| Pelit | 88% |
| Power Play (DE) | 59% |

Scorpia of Computer Gaming World gave a negative review and summarized: "Overall, in spite of the neat blight idea, Magic Candle III is a dull game. I had a hard time getting into it, and slogged on mainly to get it over with. We've all been here before and there isn't anything really new or exciting. The game is unnecessarily lengthened by the constant need for money, and, overall, one is left with the feeling of doing things by rote rather than going off a grand adventure. It is all very depressing and rather a shame, as the first Magic Candle held much promise for the future - promise that has yet to be realized".

Jim Trunzo reviewed Magic Candle III in White Wolf #36 (1993), rating it a 2 out of 5 and stated that "Negatives include a somewhat archaic interface, a bothersome need to constantly feed and rest your party, and some strange nuances that have been with the series from its inception."

Pelit called the game "traditional, a bit old-fashioned, but full of interesting ideas".
