= Mindcraft =

American video game developer

Mindcraft Software, Inc.
- Industry: Video games
- Founded: 1989
- Founder: Ali Atabek
- Headquarters: Torrance, California
- Key people: Ali Atabek; Ed Del Castillo
- Products: The Magic Candle series

Mindcraft Software (or simply Mindcraft) was an American video game developer, founded in 1989 by Ali Atabek. It is best recognized for the award-winning The Magic Candle series.

== History ==
After Ali Atabek enjoyed Ultima II, he created Rings of Zilfin for SSI. With his wife Ugur Atabek, and business partner Jim Thomas, Atabek formed Mindcraft Software to publish his next game, The Magic Candle. By 1993 the company was publishing six titles a year and had about 30 employees. The company's games were primarily developed for DOS systems, but they also developed games for Apple II, Commodore 64, and Amiga computers. The company developed 15 games between 1989 and 1997.

== Games developed ==
Year	Game	Platform
1989	The Magic Candle	Apple II, Commodore 64, DOS, PC-98
1990	The Keys to Maramon	Amiga, Commodore 64, DOS
1991	The Magic Candle II: The Four and Forty	DOS
1991	Rules of Engagement	Amiga, DOS
1992	The Magic Candle III	DOS
1992	Siege	DOS
1992	Siege: Dogs of War	DOS
1992	Star Legions	DOS
1992	Tegel's Mercenaries	DOS
1993	Ambush at Sorinor	DOS
1993	Bloodstone: An Epic Dwarven Tale	DOS
1993	Strike Squad	DOS
1993	Walls of Rome	DOS
