= Watchmen: Motion Comic =

2008 animated series, based on the DC comic book series Watchmen

- DVD cover
- Genre: Superhero
- Based on: Watchmen by: Alan Moore; Dave Gibbons
- Directed by: Jake Strider Hughes
- Voices of: Tom Stechschulte
- Theme music composer: Lennie Moore
- Country of origin: United States
- Original language: English
- No. of seasons: 1
- No. of episodes: 12

Production
- Executive producer: Wesley Coller
- Running time: 25-30 minutes (per episode); 325 minutes (DVD)
- Production companies: Cruel and Unusual Films; DC Comics; Warner Premiere

Original release
- Release: July 17, 2008 – February 23, 2009

Watchmen: Motion Comic is a 2008 American motion comic based on the 1986-1987 DC Comics limited comic book series Watchmen by Alan Moore and Dave Gibbons. The series consists of twelve abridged 25–30 minute segments, each based on and sharing a name with one of the twelve chapters of the book. All characters are voiced by actor Tom Stechschulte. It was released on DVD in March 2009 to coincide with the Watchmen film's release.

== Plot ==
In October 1985, during the Soviet invasion of Afghanistan and on the eve of nuclear war, a depressed Rorschach, one of several outlawed vigilante superheroes, begins to investigate why all former masked superheroes are either dead or have declined.

== Episodes ==
No.	Title	Original release date	Prod. code	Viewers (millions)
1	"At Midnight, All the Agents..."	July 17, 2008	TBA	4.09
Rorschach investigates the Comedian's death, formulating a "mask killer" theory.
2	"Absent Friends"	October 6, 2008	TBA	3.69
The Comedian is buried and his history is revealed through a series of flashbacks.
3	"The Judge of All the Earth"	October 20, 2008	TBA	3.41
Doctor Manhattan's relationship with Laurie Juspeczyk erodes and he discovers that many of his colleagues have contracted terminal cancer. Doctor Manhattan exiles himself to Mars.
4	"Watchmaker"	November 3, 2008	TBA	3.73
On Mars, Doctor Manhattan contemplates his history, which is revealed through a series of flashbacks.
5	"Fearful Symmetry"	November 17, 2008	TBA	2.80
Rorschach continues to pursue his "mask killer" theory, focusing on Moloch. Moloch is murdered and Rorschach is the target of a setup, leading to his capture by the police.
6	"The Abyss Gazes Also"	December 1, 2008	TBA	2.79
In police custody, Rorschach is interviewed by Dr. Malcolm Long, a psychiatrist. Rorschach's history and identity are revealed.
7	"A Brother to Dragons"	December 15, 2008	TBA	1.98
Silk Spectre continues to stay with Nite Owl and they become romantically involved. Nite Owl and Silk Spectre save people from an apartment fire, and resolve to break Rorschach out of prison.
8	"Old Ghosts"	December 29, 2008	TBA	2.81
The current Nite Owl (Dan Dreiberg) and Silk Spectre break Rorschach out of prison. Doctor Manhattan takes Silk Spectre to Mars. In retaliation for the prison break, gang members murder Hollis Mason, the retired original Nite Owl, believing him to be the one responsible for the prison break.
9	"The Darkness of Mere Being"	January 12, 2009	TBA	1.68
On Mars, Laurie (Silk Spectre) tries to convince Jon (Doctor Manhattan) to save the world, who insists life is unimportant. Laurie talks about her childhood, which is shown in a series of flashbacks. Laurie realises that the Comedian is her real father.
10	"Two Riders Were Approaching..."	January 26, 2009	TBA	2.72
Nite Owl and Rorschach continue to investigate the "mask killer" conspiracy theory, reaching the conclusion that Veidt (Ozymandias) is behind it. Rorschach mails his journal to the New Frontiersman, a right-wing newspaper.
11	"Look on My Works, Ye Mighty..."	February 9, 2009	TBA	2.42
In Karnak, his antarctic base, Ozymandias narrates his history. When Nite Owl and Rorschach confront him, believing that he planned to start World War 3, he fights them off while explaining his plan to end the Cold War by faking an alien invasion, and reveals that his plan has already been set into motion.
12	"A Stronger Loving World"	February 23, 2009	TBA	2.88
Doctor Manhattan and Silk Spectre head to Veidt's base. Veidt convinces everyone there that his fake alien has led to world peace and revealing the hoax will undermine it and make the deaths for naught. All agree except for Rorschach, who storms out, but Doctor Manhattan vaporizes him. In the end, Manhattan decides to leave Earth and Dan and Laurie assume fake identities.

== International broadcasters ==
Country	Broadcaster	Series Premiere	Timeslot
Canada	Space	June 9, 2009	22:00, 22:30
Australia	GO!	December 5, 2010	23:00
Portugal	RTP2	November 22, 2010	23:30
