= The Lord of the Rings: War of the Ring =

2003 video game

- Developer: Liquid Entertainment
- Publishers: Sierra Entertainment (Vivendi Universal Games)
- Director: Edward Alexander Del Castillo
- Producer: Ed Kaminski
- Designers: Blaine Smith; Jack Daniel Davis; Jasen Torres
- Programmers: Mark Kornkven; Ben Newell; Andrew Schnickel; Stefan Immich; Chris Robbers
- Artist: Jean Michel Ringuet
- Composer: Lennie Moore
- Series: The Lord of the Rings
- Platform: Microsoft Windows
- Release: NA: November 4, 2003; EU: November 28, 2003
- Genre: Real-time strategy
- Modes: Single player, multiplayer

The Lord of the Rings: War of the Ring is a 2003 real-time strategy game (RTS) developed by Liquid Entertainment and published by Sierra Entertainment, a subsidiary of Vivendi Universal Games. Set in J. R. R. Tolkien’s fictional Middle-earth, it expands upon the events of the War of the Ring as told in his fantasy novel, The Lord of the Rings.

War of the Ring is unrelated to the films by Peter Jackson. The game is licensed by Tolkien Enterprises.

== Gameplay ==
The game plays much like Warcraft III with added features, some previously used in Battle Realms. A similar layout and control system is used, and the player gets to control hero units with special abilities. Most regular units also have abilities of their own. The game also follows certain RTS conventions such as having rally points and controlling unit creation and purchase of upgrades at designated buildings.

Some features from Battle Realms that were carried over include toggleable walking and running for units and the ability to set buildings on fire. The game also emulates Battle Realms’ yin and yang system, where combat experience (or special actions) would provide a special resource that could be used to buy upgrades or units. This resource is called Yin or Yang in the previous game, depending on the faction being used, and is called Fate here. The player can use Fate Points (gained in combat) to summon heroes, purchase their special abilities, and activate special faction-specific Fate Powers that will aid them in gameplay (such as summoning an Ent or a Balrog). Also, some influence from Warcraft III can be seen. The Minions of Sauron must corrupt land with "war posts" before they can build upon it - similar to the Warcraft III Undead faction's "blight". When playing as the Free People, one gets to control Huorns, similar to Warcraft Night Elf "Ancient Protector" units.

The game features Places of Power, monuments that award bonuses to all units (like increased armor or attack) if controlled by the player. The player takes control of one by either finding on the map (by having a unit go near it) or wresting it from the foe (killing guards, if any, or else taking it when left unguarded).

The game utilizes a more advanced graphics engine than does Battle Realms, with variable weather and lighting effects. The engine is able to generate visual effects such as blowing grass and units sporting bloodstained weapons after they have killed enemy units.

The game records the number of enemy units killed by each of the player's units as part of the interface when each is selected.

=== Campaigns ===
The game features a Good and an Evil campaign, in which one fights the War of the Ring from opposing sides. The game does not actually dwell on prominent battles such as the Battle of the Pelennor Fields (except for the Battle of the Hornburg, featured in the Good campaign) but rather presents scenarios based upon Tolkien’s writings (with varying degrees of license taken). For example, the Good campaign starts with Gimli and the Dwarves fighting the Orcs in the Iron Hills, and one Evil mission has Grishnákh destroying the Beacons of Gondor. A more faithful scenario is the defense of Osgiliath with Boromir and Faramir.

=== Multiplayer ===
The game also features a multiplayer mode of gameplay, where players fight against either the computer (skirmish) and/or other players (via network) on preset or user-created maps. Like Battle Realms, this mode includes several variations like Razing and Survival.

=== Factions and units ===
Goblin Spearmen.

The game features two factions to choose from: The Free People of Middle-earth (the good side), and The Minions of Sauron (the evil). The Free People include Men – such as those of Gondor and Rohan, the Rangers of the North, and the Beornings – as well as the Elves and the Dwarves. Allied creatures include the Ents and Huorns. Playable heroes on this side include the Fellowship of the Ring, as well as leaders such as Faramir and Erkenbrand. The Minions of Sauron include the various kinds of Orcs and Goblins, Wargs (ridden by the Orcs), Trolls, the Haradrim Men, and the giant spiders of Mirkwood. Playable Evil heroes include Gollum and the Witch-king of Angmar. Other people or creatures from Tolkien's works featured in the game, though not normally playable by either side, include the Wild Men of Drúadan Forest and Barrow-wights.

The assignment of regular unit roles (infantry, cavalry, ranged units, or spellcasters) to Tolkien's fictional people or realms is limited, to an extent. For example, creatable Gondor units are limited to infantry (Gondor Swordsmen) and Rohan units are limited to Riders of Rohan. The only creatable ranged units for the Free People are the Dwarf Axethrower and the Elven Archer.

The game allows (or requires, in campaigns) the player to use armies which may include allies who aren't supposed to be fighting the same battles. For example, the player may create Riders of Rohan during the defense of Osgiliath; it was fought without their participation. During the scenario "Helm's Deep" in the Good campaign, one uses Gondor Swordsmen alongside Riders of Rohan and Rohan Archers (an uncreatable, campaign-only unit).

There is some mirroring between either faction's troop tree. For example, Elven Archers (ranged) and Haradrim Slayers (infantry) both have "cloaking" abilities which make them invisible. Rangers and Wraiths (not Ringwraiths) are both "detector" units which enable the player to see the former.

The game takes some liberties with units, though for the most part, these do not explicitly conflict with Tolkien's writings. For instance, the Dwarves have the Axethrower and the Dwarf Shieldbreaker, who is armed with a hammer and a shield and is covered in plate armor. Nowhere does Tolkien write that his Dwarves used hammers and throwing axes in combat, and plate armor is unmentioned in his writings except for greaves or vambraces.

Also, the game presents Tolkien's goblins as distinct from his orcs (as with The Battle for Middle-earth II); however, the author established that those terms referred to the same creatures.

Another group of Orcs, the Uruk-hai (in the books the result of cross-breeding Men and Orcs) are in the game the result of Saruman breeding Orcs with undead Barrow-wights - creatures Saruman had no relation to in the books either.

Finally, new characters have been invented, including the playable hero Saleme, a female Harad assassin.

== Reception ==
Reception

Aggregate scores
Aggregator	Score
GameRankings	67.46%
Metacritic	67/100

Review scores
Publication	Score
Game Informer	6.75/10
GamePro	3/5
GameRevolution	B−
GameSpot	6.7/10
GameSpy	3/5
GameZone	7.4/10
IGN	7.9/10
PC Gamer (US)	78%
X-Play	3/5

War of the Ring was met with mixed reception upon release, as GameRankings gave it a score of 67.46%, while Metacritic gave it 67 out of 100.

In an official GameSpot review, Jason Ocampo called it "a competent, if lackluster, effort" which would probably appeal best to "casual gamers" instead of veteran real-time strategy players, as well as "Middle-earth fans", an opinion shared by Dan Adams of IGN.

Speaking as a Tolkien "geek", Adams noted that fans of the book may find it "weird" (as he did) to see several RTS conventions applied to Tolkien's world, such as "elves and humans and dwarves... popping out of buildings" and "harvesting ore in the middle of a green field". He also noted that the game's scheme of diverse people and creatures fighting side-by-side led to "bizarre" situations untrue to the book. Playing as the Evil faction, Adams said the "population cap" (100) and the amount of "population slots" most units each take up (at least 3) made it "hard to get the feeling of superior numbers." Nevertheless, Adams said his familiarity of Tolkien's works had influenced his opinions, and that Vivendi had aimed for a game that was easy to identify with and understand. He said players who were less familiar with Tolkien's works (or were less fastidious about accuracy) would probably not have such issues.

== See also ==
- The Lord of the Rings: The Battle for Middle-earth, a 2004 RTS game set also in Middle-earth
