= Outcast (video game) =

1999 video game

- Developer: Appeal
- Publishers: Infogrames; Bigben Interactive (remake)
- Directors: Franck Sauer; Yves Grolet; Yann Robert
- Producers: Olivier Masclef; Sébastien Brison; Jean-Yves Patay; Olivier Goulay
- Designers: Renaud Dauchel; Douglas Freese; Catherine Marechal
- Composers: Lennie Moore; Sean Hickey; William Stromberg
- Engine: Unity (Second Contact)
- Platforms: Windows, PlayStation 4, Xbox One
- Release: EU: June 25, 1999; NA: August 19, 1999; Outcast 1.1; December 18, 2014; Second Contact: NA: November 7, 2017 (XONE); WW: November 14, 2017
- Genre: Action-adventure
- Mode: Single player

Outcast is an action-adventure game developed by Appeal and released by Infogrames for Windows in 1999. The game was critically acclaimed and was named the "Adventure Game of the Year" by GameSpot in 1999. In 2001, Appeal developed a sequel, called Outcast II: The Lost Paradise, which was never finished due to bankruptcy.

In 2010, Outcast was re-released via digital distribution on GOG. In 2014, Outcast was remastered as Outcast 1.1, after the original developers reacquired the franchise intellectual property. In 2017, a remake titled Outcast: Second Contact was released for Windows, PlayStation 4, and Xbox One. A sequel, Outcast: A New Beginning, was released for Windows, PlayStation 5 and Xbox Series X/S in 2024.

== Gameplay ==
Gameplay screenshot of Cutter Slade riding a twon-ha

The player controls the protagonist Cutter Slade around the alien world of Adelpha in a third-person or first-person view. Only two mouse buttons are used. The right mouse button aims the player's weapon, and the other is context-sensitive (for example, standing in front of a non-player character makes the mouse button initiate conversation, while running around has the mouse button make Cutter jump). The player can walk, run, jump, crawl, and climb onto virtually any ledge Cutter can reach with a jump.

Aside from the tutorial area, the player is free to move to any region of Adelpha as they please through the travel gates known as daokas. The player can drop teleport beacons from the F-LINK gadget to instantly move between areas inside a region, but these beacons do not work between regions. The player can acquire a twon-ha, a beast of burden that can be ridden, which makes traversing the vast regions much quicker, either by buying one or doing certain quests that reward the player with one.

A large part of the game focuses on conversing with the friendly aliens known as the Talan in order to learn the story and history of Adelpha, and to progress in Cutter's mission to find the probe. While this can all be skipped, they treat the player differently depending on how the player treats them, through a reputation system. If the player performs many tasks to help the Talan, their reputation with them improves and the Talan become more eager to help. If the player does things that harm the Talan, they will become more and more angry with the player and aggressively dismiss them. There are multiple variations of dialogues which are selected either randomly or based on the player's reputation.

Each weapon in the game fires slow-moving projectiles, requiring the player to constantly maneuver to avoid the enemy soldiers' attacks, and carefully aiming so that the player's will connect. Alternatively, the player can sneak around the enemy, by use of standing behind cover, lying down in a muddy field, using gadgets that turn Cutter invisible for a short time, and so on. Cutter begins the game with just a pistol and his fists, and the player can buy more weapons and upgrades, while ammunition can either be found in the world, or crafted by taking a certain amount of materials to a Talan known as a Recreator. Soldiers will sound different alarms with a horn-like instrument when they see the player, to give orders to others nearby. They will try to move behind the player in order to flank them and search the area or call for a meeting when they can no longer find the player. In addition to soldiers, the hostile and less intelligent Adelphan wildlife will try to fight the player if they come too close.

The enemy soldiers can be weakened by performing a certain task for the leader of each region. When this is done, they will stop producing resources for the soldiers: stopping food production lowers their health, stopping the mining operations makes their weapons less powerful, etc. A good reputation is necessary to convince the Talan to stop production of resources, so the player is encouraged to be good to the Talan.

Outcast uses a unique way to save games, integrated with the game world. At the start of the game, the player receives an object called a "Gaamsaav" and instructed that the Gaamsaav is able to "capture his essence", so that it may later be restored. To save a game, the player equips the Gaamsaav and "squeezes" it, making it glow and emit a sound. The sound can be heard by enemies and they will investigate, so that the player must take the situation into account before saving a game. After a few seconds, the game pauses and a menu overlay appears.

== Plot ==
In 2007, the U.S. government sends a probe to Adelpha, an alien world in a parallel universe. The probe starts transmitting video images of the world back to Earth. Minutes into the mission, an alien life form discovers the probe and damages it, causing an unforeseen backlash of energy that creates a black hole, threatening Earth. After being briefed on the situation by his old friend Major Vernon, former U.S. Navy SEAL Cutter Slade is given the job of escorting three scientists (William Kauffmann, Anthony Xue and Marion Wolfe) on a mission to this alien world to repair the probe and close the black hole. Arriving in Adelpha, Cutter is separated from the three scientists and, to his surprise, is hailed by the natives as their messiah, the Ulukai.

The main population of Adelpha are a bipedal species called the Talan. Their technology is comparable to those of ancient China or medieval Europe, however they have psychic abilities that vary depending on each Talan's "essence": fire, earth, water, or air. Talan soldiers with the fae (fire) essence use energy weapons that are powered by their psychic abilities. Adelpha is split into several regions that are connected by a system of intercontinental portals known as daokas. These are relics of an ancient civilization, about which the Talan know little. At the time of Cutter's arrival the fire Talan have taken over society and rule through violence and intimidation. This is a relatively recent state of affairs; previously the Talan lived in harmony.

As the game progresses, Cutter learns that the four members of the expedition were separated not in location, but in time. Marion arrives shortly after Cutter, but Kauffmann and Xue arrived decades earlier, and the original probe has not arrived yet. Upon learning of their predicament Xue became unstable, fell out with Kauffmann, and took over the Talan warrior caste, teaching them to be violent and xenophobic. This directly led to a Talan warrior attacking the probe on sight when it arrives, causing the creation of the black hole that threatens the Earth. Kauffmann realised that he could not stop Xue, and started the cult of the Ulukai among the non-warrior Talan before his death, preparing them to help Cutter when he arrives.

Cutter weakens the warrior Talan and unites the other castes, and ultimately defeats Xue and his warriors. With Marion's help, he retrieves the lost computer cards needed to repair the probe. Marion is killed by Xue before the repairs can be completed. Following instructions left by Kauffmann, Cutter repairs the probe and strips down its internals so he can use it as a vehicle to return to Earth, where the return of the probe was expected to close the black hole.

== Development ==
Outcast's graphics engine is mainly a combination of a ray casting (heightmap) engine, used to render the landscape, and a texture mapping polygon engine used to render objects. The "Engine Programming" section of the credits in the manual has several subsections related to graphics, among them: "Landscape Engine", "Polygon Engine", "Water & Shadows Engine" and "Special effects Engine". Although Outcast is often cited as a forerunner of voxel technology, this is somewhat misleading. The game does not actually model three-dimensional volumes of voxels. Instead, it models the ground as a surface, which may be seen as being made up of voxels. The ground is decorated with objects that are modeled using texture-mapped polygons. When Outcast was developed, the term "voxel engine", when applied to video games, commonly referred to a ray casting engine (for example the Voxel Space engine). On the engine technology page of the game's website, the landscape engine is also referred to as the "Voxels engine". The engine is purely software based; it does not rely on hardware-acceleration via a 3D graphics card.

Outcast features effects such as character shadows, depth of field, bump mapping and reflections. Anti-aliasing is used to smooth certain texture boundaries. The heightmap engine renders reliefs with self-occlusion, motion parallax, and silhouettes (but no shadowing), even for details such as cobblestones. Water surfaces appear both translucent and reflective. The surface appears to reflect the environment (the skybox) and appears rippled with moving waves, which react to the character's movement while in the water. The degree of translucency depends on the viewing angle. The more vertical the angle, the clearer the water appears while the more horizontal the angle, the stronger the reflections. Other visual effects include bloom and lens flares, falling snow, fire, and other glowing particles. The disadvantage of this type of CPU-intensive software-rendering was that Outcast required an extremely powerful CPU (nothing but the most powerful Intel Pentium III processors of the time, in the 500–600 MHz range) and massive amounts of RAM (128 megabytes were recommended) to run at full speed and maximum resolution (512 x 384).

The AI used in Outcast was based on a proprietary engine codenamed GAIA, for Game Artificial Intelligence with Agents, which was composed by a set of C++ libraries based on research in distributed AI. Intelligence is represented as a distributed activity over a set of autonomous routines called agents. An agent uses skills, such as hearing, sight, acrobatic, to complete assigned tasks. These agents can interact and even compete with each other to realize a complex task.

Outcast features a high-quality orchestral score composed by Lennie Moore and performed by the Moscow Symphony Orchestra and choir. At the time of Outcast's release, orchestral game scores were uncommon, and Moore's achievement was hailed as "absolutely top-notch". The game's publisher Infogrames released the hour-long score on a soundtrack album and it was later made available for MP3 download on the game's official website. Owners of the original game can listen to the soundtrack by putting disc 2 into a CD player.

A Dreamcast port was planned, but was shelved when the Windows version failed commercially.

== Release ==
After Outcast was released, developer Appeal published a series of short films on its website, called "Outcast Outtakes", which were also included on the DVD version of the game. It was essentially a series of in-game recordings which were made to poke fun at itself, such as Cutter making an advertisement for his backpack that acts much like a magic satchel, by showcasing that he could store house furniture such as doors and chairs in it, or extra scenes involving Nikaa.

=== Re-release ===
On April 20, 2010, Outcast was re-released via digital distribution by GOG. The re-released game is compatible with Windows XP, Windows Vista and Windows 7. This version of the game includes fixes for several of problems, including a community-made patch that negates the need to use a CPU slowdown program, and is generally playable on modern PCs without any extra troubleshooting required. Another small bug ("Cyana lighthouse problem") was fixed later by the fan community who also created patches which allow higher display resolutions beyond 512 x 384 and widescreen support.

== Reception ==
=== Critical reviews ===
Review aggregation website GameRankings assessed an 81% average score.

Writing in 2009, GamesRadar+ praised the game as "revolutionary", noting that its freedom to explore a three-dimensional open world preceded Grand Theft Auto III by two years.

GameSpot and Computer Gaming World named Outcast the best adventure game of 1999. The latter publication's editors wrote, "It was a slim year for adventure games, to be sure, but that in no way should diminish the achievement of Outcast." The game was also nominated in this category by Computer Games Strategy Plus and CNET Gamecenter, losing to Gabriel Knight 3. During the 3rd Annual Interactive Achievement Awards, the Academy of Interactive Arts & Sciences nominated Outcast for "Computer Adventure/Role-Playing Game of the Year", which was ultimately given to Asheron's Call; it was also nominated for "Outstanding Achievement in Original Music Composition", which was awarded to Um Jammer Lammy.

Adam Pavlacka reviewed the PC version of the game for Next Generation, rating it four stars out of five, and stated that "If you're tired of FPS madness – and you've got some serious horsepower – give Outcast a try. Soon you'll be drawn into a world of beauty and intrigue, and won't want to leave."

According to review aggregator Metacritic, the remake Outcast: Second Contact received mixed reviews on all platforms.

=== Sales ===
Outcast sold 12,571 copies in the United States by the end of 1999, according to tracking firm PC Data. In the German market, it debuted at #3 on Media Control's computer game sales chart for June 1999. The title held a position in the top 5 through August, and remained at 10th during the first half of September, before falling to 19th in the last two weeks of that month. By December, its sales in the German market had surpassed 50,000 units, which Udo Hoffman of PC Player called "a nice number". Global sales of Outcast ultimately reached 400,000 units by 2002.

== Legacy and sequel ==
In 1999, a sequel, called Outcast II: The Lost Paradise, was being developed by Appeal for the PlayStation 2, PC, and GameCube. During development, Appeal went bankrupt and development ceased. Appeal had been requesting funds from their publisher to help finish the game for release but this was not granted.

Since around 2003 the fan-group Eternal Outcasts had developed a free sequel called Open Outcast. The project initially used the Gothic and later the Crystal Space 3D engines but has made the step to the CryEngine 2. The project released in 2010 two tech demos (Oasis 1.0 and 1.1) which can be played together with the Crysis Wars demo version. In 2013 the project was moved to CryEngine 3 to be developed as a standalone game rather than a mod. The project was renamed to Outcast: Legacy of the Yods in order to reflect this change. On April 16, 2017, team Eternal Outcasts released the final CryEngine 3 technical demo along with Steam Greenlight submission of the project. The game was then renamed to Legacy of the Yods, and the word Outcast was removed to avoid copyright issues. The project has ceased development since.

On July 3, 2013, it was reported that Yann Robert, Franck Sauer and Yves Grolet of Belgian developer Appeal had acquired the intellectual property from Atari, SA with the intention to revive the franchise.

On April 7, 2014, a Kickstarter crowdfunding campaign was launched by members of the original development team with the goal of $600,000 for an HD remake of Outcast. The campaign failed to reach its funding goal with only 45% of the required amount achieved and therefore no money transferred.

On December 18, 2014, Outcast was remastered as Outcast 1.1 on Steam and later on GOG.com and Zoom Platform. Outcast 1.1 was built and recompiled from the original source code with improved stability, higher resolution support (max. 1920x1080 due to fixed-point z-buffer), and multi-threaded rendering support. Also, there is ongoing work on patching out remaining bugs and glitches by the developers.

An official remake, titled Outcast: Second Contact, was released on November 14, 2017, for Microsoft Windows, PlayStation 4 and Xbox One. It was developed by Appeal, while Bigben Interactive served as the game's publisher.

On September 17, 2021, THQ Nordic announced an official sequel titled Outcast 2: A New Beginning for Microsoft Windows, PlayStation 5 and Xbox Series X/S. It was developed by Appeal, while THQ Nordic serving as the game's publisher. In August 2023, the game was renamed to Outcast: A New Beginning. It was eventually released on March 15, 2024.
