= Surtur (character) =

Marvel Comics fictional characters

- Surtur as depicted in Thor #176 (May 1970). Art by Jack Kirby.

Publication information
- Publisher: Marvel Comics
- First appearance: Cameo appearance: Journey into Mystery #97 (October 1963); Full appearance: Journey into Mystery #99 (December 1963)
- Created by: Stan Lee (writer); Jack Kirby (artist)

In-story information
- Species: Fire Giant
- Partnerships: Ymir
- Abilities: Superhuman strength, speed, agility, endurance, stamina, durability, senses, reflexes and wisdom; Pyrokinesis; Shapeshifting; Levitation; Dimensional travel; Immortality; The Twilight Sword grants: Manipulation of magical energies

Surtur is a fictional character appearing in American comic books published by Marvel Comics, commonly as an enemy of Thor. Based on the fire giant Surtr from Norse mythology, he was adapted by writer Stan Lee and artist Jack Kirby, and first appeared in Journey into Mystery #97 (October 1963). The character was once described as one of "The Ten Most Heinous Enemies of the Mighty Thor".

The character has appeared in several media adaptations of Thor. Surtur made his live-action debut in the Marvel Cinematic Universe film Thor: Ragnarok (2017), motion-captured by Taika Waititi, and voiced by Clancy Brown. Brown reprised the role as an alternate reality version of the character in the Disney+ animated series What If...? (2021-2023).

== Publication history ==
Based on the fire giant Surtr from Norse mythology and created by Stan Lee and Jack Kirby, the character first appeared in Journey into Mystery #97 (October 1963).

== Fictional character biography ==
Surtur is a fire giant native to the extradimensional plane of Muspelheim, land of the fire demons and one of the nine worlds in Norse mythology. He first appears in the title Journey into Mystery, where it is claimed he sits at the end of the world waiting for the end of time where he can slay men and gods. The character's first encounter with the Asgardian ruler Odin is told in flashback and establishes their enmity when Surtur is imprisoned by Odin inside the Earth after forming an alliance with the Trolls and trying to destroy the world in anger for Odin defying him, although he gives Odin a winged horse, hoping to be released one day. Surtur reappears in Journey into Mystery #104, having been freed by Odin's adopted son, Loki, who intends to usurp Odin and rule Asgard, having been given a portion of the Odinforce. Together with the Storm Giant Skagg, the character invades Earth, although the pair are met by Odin, his son the Thunder God Thor and fellow Asgardian Balder. Odin stops time and sends every human on Earth to another dimension. Surtur creates a blazing fireball and travels to the North Pole to melt the icecaps. Using Odin's sword, Thor stops Surtur and traps him on a meteorite of magnetic particles in another galaxy.

In the title Thor the seer Volla predicts that Loki will free Surtur and other enemies of Asgard and eventually bring about Ragnarok – a war that will end with the destruction of all the Norse Gods. The character features in the title The Avengers when summoned – together with ice giant Ymir – to Earth by the cult the Sons of Satannish. The entities are banished by the combined efforts of the superhero team the Avengers, the hero the Black Knight, and the sorcerer Doctor Strange. They are tricked into striking each other, which defeats them both.

Surtur becomes a recurring foe in the title Thor, and first attempts to invade Asgard during the Odinsleep when Loki has briefly taken control, causing Loki to flee Asgard, but he is repelled and imprisoned. Surtur reappears wielding the huge magical blade Twilight, and after sending a horde of demons to invade Earth storms Asgard. The heroes of Earth battle the fire demons while in Asgard Surtur defeats both Thor and Odin in turn. Loki deceives Surtur with an illusion until Odin recovers, who battles the fire demon until both fall into a dimensional rift. After a long absence Odin returns to Asgard, and it is revealed that he absorbed Surtur's essence, which eventually possesses him. Surtur manages to recreate his physical form and decimates Asgard until Thor, wielding the Odin Power, banishes Surtur to the Sea of Eternal Night.

Surtur appears at the conclusion of the second volume of Thor during the final Ragnarok of Asgard, and is allowed to storm Asgard by Thor as the Thunder God attempts to break the endless cycle of death and rebirth for the Norse Gods. In the limited series Stormbreaker: The Saga of Beta Ray Bill, the alien Beta Ray Bill visits the ruins of Asgard after the battle, and sees Surtur's dead form falling from the sky, still clutching Twilight.

Thor returns from a period of self-induced hibernation in a third self-titled volume, and enters the Odinsleep to find Odin in a limbo dimension between life and death, where Surtur stored a portion of his essence to prevent himself from being killed forever. Here Odin and the demon battle to the death, being reborn each day to repeat the cycle, preventing either from being reborn. Thor helps Odin beat Surtur twice, even though he will be reborn, before returning to his body. Thor offers to help Odin escape from this realm and the constant battle with Surtur. Odin chooses to remain to protect his people from the demon.

Surtur was resurrected and made a deal with Loki and a group of beings known as the Manchester Gods, who he manipulated to depose the native gods of the British isles. He then set the world tree Yggdrasil on fire and attempted to turn the Vanir gods against the Aesir in preparation for his assault on Asgard. This succeeded because of old grudges, namely Odin's insistence that the people of Vanaheim fall under his rule no matter what.

== Powers, abilities, and equipment ==
Surtur was depicted as an immense, but malevolent elemental fire demon of apocalyptic proportions. Standing over 1,000 feet (300 m) in height, Surtur possesses physical attributes far surpassing Thor himself, the ability to generate intense heat, flames, or concussive force, a prehensile tail, capable of transforming his fingers into serpents via molecular rearrangement, flight, and interdimensional travel. His cosmic powers are usually shown to equal that of Odin. He is a master warrior and swordsman. Surtur has great wisdom, as well as extensive knowledge of ancient lore. He is also vulnerable to extreme coldness or certain magic spells.

=== Equipment ===
The Twilight Sword (also called the Sword of Doom) is composed from the metal alloy Scabrite, which can only be found in the mines of Surtur's realm. This giant weapon possesses mystical properties that allows Surtur to manipulate magical energy in vast amounts and perform nearly limitless feats, such as shattering dimensional barriers or inhibiting Odin's powers. When this sword is bonded with the Eternal Flame, its capabilities are further increased to an unknown level.

The Eternal Flame (also known as the Eternal Flame of Destruction) further enhances Surtur's abilities and cannot be extinguished.

== Reception ==
In 2022, CBR.com ranked Surtur 5th in their "Black Knight's 10 Strongest Villains" list.

== Other versions ==
=== Amalgam Comics ===
Surtur appears in the Amalgam Comics one-shot publication Thorion of the New Gods.

=== Ultimate Marvel ===
In the Ultimate Marvel reality, Surtur is seen summoned to Earth by Loki and battling the Ultimates. However, he is not seen in the final battle with the Ultimates.

=== Ultimate Universe ===
Surtur appears in the Ultimate Universe imprint. Thor unleashes Surtur with the intent to burn down all of Asgard to defeat All-Father Loki.

== In other media ==
=== Television ===
- Surtur makes a cameo appearance in the Spider-Man and His Amazing Friends episode "The Vengeance of Loki".
- Surtur appears in The Avengers: Earth's Mightiest Heroes, voiced by Rick D. Wasserman.
- Surtur appears in Avengers Assemble.

=== Film ===
- Surtur makes a non-speaking cameo appearance in a flashback in Thor: Tales of Asgard.
- Surtur makes a non-speaking cameo appearance in Hulk Vs Thor.

=== Marvel Cinematic Universe ===
Hulk fighting Surtur in the 2017 film Thor: Ragnarok

Surtur appears in media set in the Marvel Cinematic Universe (MCU), voiced by Clancy Brown.

- Surtur first appears in the live-action film Thor: Ragnarok, in which director Taika Waititi provides physical motion capture.
- Alternate timeline variants of Surtur make minor appearances in the Disney+ animated series What If...?, voiced by Brown.

=== Video games ===
- Surtur makes a cameo appearance in Marvel: Ultimate Alliance.
- Surtur appears in Thor: God of Thunder, voiced again by Rick D. Wasserman.
- Surtur appears in Marvel Super Hero Squad Online.
- Surtur appears as the final boss of Marvel Heroes.
- Surtur appears as a boss in Marvel Avengers Alliance.
- Surtur appears as a playable character and boss in Lego Marvel Super Heroes 2.
- Surtur appears as a boss in Marvel: Future Fight.
- Surtur appears in Marvel Ultimate Alliance 3: The Black Order, voiced by Jamieson Price.
- Surtur appears in Marvel Snap.
