= Liquid Entertainment =

American video game developer

- Type: Private
- Industry: Video games
- Founded: April 1999
- Founders: Ed Del Castillo, Mike Grayford
- Defunct: 2018
- Fate: Dissolved
- Headquarters: La Cañada Flintridge, California, U.S.
- Key people: Ed Del Castillo, Holly Newman
- Products: Battle Realms; Dragonshard; Desperate Housewives
- Website: goliquid.us

Liquid Entertainment was an American independent video game developer based in Pasadena, California. The studio was founded in April 1999 by Ed Del Castillo and Mike Grayford.

== History ==
Liquid Entertainment was founded in April 1999 by Ed Del Castillo and Mike Grayford.

Liquid's first game was Battle Realms, published by Crave Entertainment in November 2001 to critical acclaim. Battle Realms is a real-time strategy PC game for Windows that features an unconventional approach to resource management and unit development. It was well received by reviewers, many of whom praised its at-the-time state of the art 3D engine and East Asian-inspired setting and aesthetics but sale numbers were disappointing. It was also chosen for Computer Gaming World's Top 10 Games of E3 2001. Battle Realms was followed up with a stand-alone expansion pack, Battle Realms: Winter of the Wolf in April 2002. Winter of the Wolf was received with less enthusiasm than Battle Realms by the gaming community; some reviewers compared it unfavorably to 2002's blockbuster real-time strategy titles Warcraft III and Age of Mythology.

Since the release of Winter of the Wolf, Liquid has developed two real-time strategy PC games based on intellectual property licenses: In November 2003, Sierra released The Lord of the Rings: War of the Ring, based on Vivendi Universal's license to Tolkien's literary works, and in October 2005 Atari published the Dungeons & Dragons PC game Dragonshard. Dragonshard has since been re-released on GOG.com.

In October 2006, Buena Vista Games released Desperate Housewives: The Game, a life simulation computer game adaptation of the popular television series Desperate Housewives. Desperate Housewives: The Game won PC Gamer Adventure Game of the Year for 2007.

Liquid's next game Rise of the Argonauts, released in December 2008 and published by Codemasters, is a Greek mythology-themed action role-playing game for Windows, PlayStation 3 and Xbox 360 that received mixed reviews, with criticisms centering on technical problems, derivative art direction and repetitive gameplay. In 2011 Sega published Liquid's second console game for Xbox 360 and PS3 Thor: God of Thunder that coincided with Marvel Studios's release of the film Thor in May 2011.

In 2012 Liquid pivoted into developing casual games for Facebook. They did some contract work on InstantJam, a music rhythm game for Facebook, Deadline Hollywood: Game based on the popular Hollywood news blog Deadline Hollywood by Nikki Finke and Paramount Digital Entertainment for Facebook and iOS and Dungeons and Dragons: Heroes of Neverwinter, a turn-based strategy game published by Atari on Facebook.

Later in 2013 and 2014 they continued their pivot into mobile games with titles like Karateka (console and mobile), Cuddle Pets, Paper Galaxy, and Max Steel. By the end of 2014, Ed decided to downsize Liquid to its current position as a holding company and consultancy; selling off some of its holdings, licensing some of its technology, and keep the rest for future opportunities.

Liquid currently manages a number of properties that are available online and published Battle Realms: Zen Edition as Early Access on Steam in December, 2019.

== Games developed ==
Year	Title	Publisher
2001	Battle Realms	Crave Entertainment; Ubi Soft
2002	Battle Realms: Winter of the Wolf	Crave Entertainment; Ubi Soft
2003	The Lord of the Rings: War of the Ring	Sierra Entertainment
2005	Dungeons & Dragons: Dragonshard	Atari
2006	Desperate Housewives: The Game	Buena Vista Games
2008	Rise of the Argonauts	Codemasters
2011	Thor: God of Thunder	Sega
2012	Instant Jam: Facebook	GarageGames
2012	Deadline Hollywood: The Game	Paramount Digital Entertainment
2012	Dungeons and Dragons: Heroes of Neverwinter	Atari
2012	Paper Galaxy	Liquid Entertainment
2012	Karateka	Karateka, LLC
2013	Cuddle Pets	Digital Capital
2014	Max Steel	Mattel

=== Nominations ===
Title	Nomination
Battle Realms	2002 nomination in "PC Strategy" category for The Academy of Interactive Arts & Sciences (AIAS) awards
Desperate Housewives: The Game	2007 nomination in "Outstanding Achievement in Character Performance – Female" category for the AIAS awards
