= The Magic Candle II: The Four and Forty =

1991 video game

- Developer: Mindcraft
- Publisher: Electronic Arts
- Platform: MS-DOS
- Release: 1991
- Genre: Role-playing
- Mode: Single-player

The Magic Candle II: The Four and Forty is a fantasy role-playing video game developed for MS-DOS by Mindcraft and published in 1991 by Electronic Arts. Characters from the original game, The Magic Candle, can be imported into the sequel.

== Gameplay ==
The game has skills which characters can train in to improve their effectiveness. This includes common role-playing game skills like "sword" and "magic", and less common skills, such as "music" and "carpentry".

The magic system is similar to that of Dungeons & Dragons. Magic-using characters can study spells while camping at night, in order to be able to cast them the next day.

== Reception ==
Computer Gaming World's Scorpia wrote in 1992 that "Magic Candle II is an uneven sequel ... many improvements have been made, and some good touches added [but] not all those improvements have been properly implemented and, with the excessive combat, makes the game irritating at times". She concluded that the game was "still several cuts above the typical CRPG" and stated that fans of the first game would enjoy it. Stefan Petrucha wrote that year that "on a technical basis, MC2 doesn't fare well at all" compared to the Ultima series, describing the graphics as "archaic". He called NPC management "cumbersome" and the built-in notes "either uselessly massive" or "fail to record important data". He nonetheless called the story "a resounding success ... eccentric and fun", and recommended the game "to whom a CRPG means story, quirky characters and plenty of atmosphere". In 1993, Scorpia stated that while better than other CRPGs, Magic Candle II "isn't quite up to its predecessor".

Jim Trunzo reviewed Magic Candle II: The Four and Forty in White Wolf #32 (July/Aug., 1992), rating it a 3 out of 5 and stated that "Overall, Magic Candle II is a product that will run the gamut with game players. Most people will rank MCII among the best fantasy games they've ever played due to its realism, others will be nonplused, and a few may even find it not to their taste due to the attention that must be paid to minute details. If you are looking for a game that has a somewhat unique approach to fantasy role-playing and don't mind less than state-of-the-art visuals, Magic Candle II is just the game for you."
