= Rise of the Argonauts =

2008 video game

- Developer: Liquid Entertainment
- Publisher: Codemasters
- Producer: David Marino
- Designer: Charley Price
- Programmer: Matthew Altman
- Artist: Daniel Cabuco
- Writer: Rico Sablan
- Composer: Tyler Bates
- Engine: Unreal Engine 3
- Platforms: Microsoft Windows, PlayStation 3, Xbox 360
- Release: AU: 12 December 2008; NA: 16 December 2008; EU: 16 December 2008; UK: 6 February 2009
- Genre: Action role-playing
- Mode: Single-player

Rise of the Argonauts is a 2008 action role-playing game developed by Liquid Entertainment and published by Codemasters for Microsoft Windows, PlayStation 3 and Xbox 360. Although very much at variance with the story of Jason in the original Greek mythology, the game's plot surrounds the myth of Jason and the Argonauts searching for the Golden Fleece.

== Plot ==
=== Story ===
In Rise of the Argonauts, the player assumes the role of the protagonist Jason, in this instance portrayed as a king of Iolcus. Jason's bride, a warrioress princess called Alceme Enialios, who is the daughter of a Mycenean king called Lycomedes, is assassinated on the wedding day. Jason avenges Alceme by killing the assassin, who led an unexplained attack by mercenaries from Ionia—and begins to investigate the doomsday cult of Hecate-worshippers in which the assassin admitted membership. Jason seals Alceme's body in the temple where the two were to marry, and it becomes Alceme's mausoleum. Jason quickly discovers that the only way to bring back his wife is to obtain the Golden Fleece, as it is said that the Fleece alone can undo events that have already occurred. Traveling to Delphi, Jason learns from the Oracle that the only way to tread the road to the Fleece is to find three descendants of three of his patron gods: Hermes, Ares and Athena. The descendant of Hermes is found on Saria, Athena's on Kythra, whereas Ares' is located on Mycenae.

After convincing all of them to join him, Jason travels to Delphi again and learns that the Fleece is in Tartarus, the Hell of the Greek Underworld. After obtaining it, Jason sails home to revive Alceme. He confronts Pelias, his traitorous uncle. During the course of the game, Jason will face Blacktongues, who are behind Alceme's assassination, Ionians mercenaries, mythical beasts and other characters, but he would not be alone.

=== Characters ===
- Jason – The young king set out for the quest to seek the Golden Fleece. He's the leader of the Argonauts and the sole character the player will control. Depending on which gods Jason hails the most, he can become proficient in the sword, spear, mace, and even his shield offensively. Jason's overall personality is decided by the player's actions and choices.
- Hercules – A son of Zeus and an old friend of Jason's. Knowing Jason's pain from losing his wife and children, Hercules joins his friend on his quest. Needing only his great legendary strength, Hercules' sole weapons are his own bare hands (and feet). Despite his continuous bad luck, he is a jovial soul, and frequently engages Pan in debates.
- Atalanta – The world's fastest woman. She was raised by centaurs and joins Jason's crew to save her people and see the world. She wields a bow in combat. Though aloof and headstrong, Atalanta is more insecure than she lets on. She also has a teasing, playful side, and is very loyal to her tribe.
- Achilles – The great and "undefeated, unrivaled, untouchable" hero of the Mycenaean arena who is destined to die in the Trojan War. He has yet to find something to fight for, as he has it all: women, wine, fame. He only joins Jason for glory and wields a dual-bladed spear. Achilles is a boastful, wisecracking sort, and he and Atalanta quarrel sometimes.
- Pan – The wise old satyr of lore, Pan has been wandering the world for nearly 800 years. Pan is the healer and resident spell caster of the Argonauts. He has a very spirited, if eccentric, personality, like when he claims going to Tartarus would be an experience he'd give everything to see. He is a poet and loves telling stories, but is lonely.
- Lykas – Chief of the Nisyros, a tribe of centaurs who raised Atalanta after the death of her parents. Lykas is the descendant of Hermes whom the Oracle foresaw helping Jason on his quest. Despite being one of Hermes' most devout followers, Lykas hardly resembles the trickster god. He is evenhanded, honest, does not exaggerate, and upholds the law even when he does not approve. He has a lame front leg.
- Medea – Once a member of the Blacktongues, now hostile towards them when she realized they made her a thrall, she joins the Argonauts to help Jason kill them. Medea vowed to never be powerless again after her father Aetes married her off when she was 12 to a suitor of 60.
- Argos – The builder of the Argo. He requests that Jason let him steer the ship. Argos is later killed by one of Pelias' Blacktongue associates. Jason later avenges him. He is upbeat, studious, and a stargazer, but does not like pipers, and is the cook of the ship.
- Daedalus – A Minoan blacksmith who forges armor and weapons for Jason when he is fighting in the arena. When Jason finds out he is in danger (being pursued by agents of King Minos), Jason allows him to join the Argonauts. Daedalus is a bit of a jokester, casual, but has a hefty ego, and refers to himself as "the world's foremost genius".
- Medusa – Once was a very beautiful woman, she has been turned into a hideous beast. Medusa is the indirect descendant of Athena, whom Jason must convince to join his crew. She was once serious about her station and people, and when (if) she is restored to her former self, she'll have lapses of vanity she immediately tries to rectify. She dislikes the sight of blood. In the game, Perseus is her brother.
- Nessus – A centaur who tamed the manticore Hep'naje, a boss battle in the game. Nessus is killed by Atalanta and Jason. He is gruff, a realist, but is proud of his son, and later reveals he was promised sky and endless fields of grass for helping the Blacktongues.
- Blacktongues – Sorcerers and assassins whose power comes from commune with Tartarus. They worship the Titaness Hecate and believe her to be the true ruler of Tartarus, where she was born. They believe the pre-Olympian gods deserve their throne back.
- King Lycomedes – King of Mycenae and Alceme's father. At first he blames Jason for Alceme's death, but after various trials, trusts him and joins Jason on his quest. He is a priest of Ares, and is very much like him – proud, aggressive, and protective of his family.
- Captain Idas – A very skilled warrior and Captain of the Iolcan guard, he retires in the beginning of the game after the attack.
- Patroclus – Head of the Mycenaean arena. Allied with Docon in a failed plot to kill King Lycomedes. Daedalus says Patroclus has two talents – "Business and thinking up ways for men to die."
- Elpis – A young and faithful servant of Jason's.
- Mnason – The father of the Iolcan guards Timaeus and Pathras. Mnason is killed by Pelias, along with Captain Idas, Elpis, and many more.
- Pelias – Jason's uncle and adviser for Iolcus. He is the secret Blacktongue leader and is killed by Jason at the very end of the game. Pelias is a learned man, but Jason's father did not trust him and sent him away.
- Xeno – Menander's arrogant, loud-mouthed brother who causes trouble in Iolcus due to Jason's failure to protect his brother on his visit during the assassination.
- Pytheas – A young lyre-playing merchant from Mycenae. Husband to Zosime. He plans to move to Massalia. An orphan himself, Pytheas adopts Bolo.
- Bolo – An orphan from Mycenae who is forced to steal money for his brutal stepfather, the Stork. Bolo is a gullible boy who sings terribly. He wants to find his place in the world.
- Docon – The Ionian champion who comes to Mycenae for the tournament.
- Captain Ekekios – Captain of the Mycenaean guard. He was paid by the Blacktongues to keep their presence in Mycenae a secret.
- Sinon – An ambitious, if foolhardy teenager from Iolcus who wants to be a warrior, but after the events on Iolcus, admits Jason was right about him not being a fighter, and says he can stick to the shadows well enough.
- Phaedon – A Blacktongue orator who invaded Kythra and stole the Golden Fleece. He seduces Medusa (before her transformation) and is killed by Jason. He is noted as a prince and scholar.
- Lysander – A former Blacktongue, sent to kill the Oracle Pelagia after she gave King Lycomedes information on Alceme's fate. Instead of killing her, Lysander falls in love with Pelagia and they flee to Saria, where Pelagia gives birth to Atalanta. Both Lysander and Pelagia were later killed by manticores.

== Reception ==
Reception

Aggregate score
Aggregator	Score
Metacritic	59/100 (19 reviews)

Review scores
Publication	Score
Game Informer	6/10
GameSpot	6/10
IGN	6.2
Official U.S. PlayStation Magazine	2.5/5
Official Xbox Magazine (UK)	8/10
Official Xbox Magazine (US)	7.5/10

Reviews have been mixed, with the game receiving praise for its story, leveling up/skill tree system, music and visuals, but criticism for its sparse placement of enemies and relatively easy boss fights. Criticisms also centered on the amount of time spent in conversation with characters in the game, with the lack of compelling voice performances not helping the situation. Further criticisms included technical issues like bugs, camera problems and crashes.
