= Thor: God of Thunder =

2011 Marvel Studios video game

- North American cover art
- Developers: Liquid Entertainment (PS3, Xbox 360); Red Fly Studios (Wii, Nintendo 3DS); WayForward Technologies (Nintendo DS)
- Publisher: Sega
- Producers: Matt Powers; Robb Alvey (Nintendo DS)
- Writers: Matt Fraction; Austin Ivansmith (Nintendo DS)
- Composers: Inon Zur; Jake Kaufman (Nintendo DS)
- Engine: Unreal Engine 3 (non-Nintendo versions); Infernal (Wii and 3DS versions)
- Platforms: Nintendo DS; PlayStation 3 Wii; Xbox 360; Nintendo 3DS
- Release: AU: April 28, 2011; EU: April 29, 2011; NA: May 3, 2011; Nintendo 3DS: AU: September 8, 2011; EU: September 9, 2011; NA: September 13, 2011
- Genres: Action, hack and slash (home console); Platformer (DS)
- Mode: Single-player

Thor: God of Thunder is a 2011 American action hack and slash video game based on the Marvel Studios film Thor. The game was developed by Liquid Entertainment and co-written by Matt Fraction. Thor: God of Thunder marks Thor's first standalone appearance in a video game and features the voices of Chris Hemsworth, Tom Hiddleston and Jaimie Alexander, who reprise their roles from the film.

The game was released in 2011 for Nintendo DS, PlayStation 3, Wii, Xbox 360 and Nintendo 3DS. The PS3 and Xbox 360 versions of the game can be played in 3D on 3DTVs and on 2DTVs via TriOviz Inificolor 3D glasses. The PlayStation 3 and Xbox 360 versions were met with unfavorable reviews, while the Wii, DS, and 3DS versions were met with mixed reviews.

Despite the game's existence outside of the canonicity of the Marvel Cinematic Universe, some characters from the game, such as Surtur and Hela (from the Nintendo DS version), eventually appeared in the 2017 film Thor: Ragnarok.

== Plot ==
The game begins in medias res with Asgard being invaded by the Jötun (frost giants from Jotunheim). Thor, meanwhile, is training with Sif and his brother Loki. Their training is interrupted, however, by the arrival of the Frost Giants. While Loki leaves to inform Odin about the invasion, Thor is left to fight alone after Sif is frozen by one of the arriving jötun. After quickly fending his enemies off and setting Sif free, Thor goes to Odin's castle to defend Asgard. The invasion is stopped, but Sif is fatally wounded in the process. After Thor is denied retribution for the invasion and Sif's condition by Odin, Thor disobeys his father's orders. He travels to Niflheim, aided by one of Loki's projected clones (revealed to be the mastermind behind the invasion). While Thor travels to Niflheim, it is shown that Odin manages to save Sif from death, and then he proceeds to enter the Odinsleep.

As Thor arrives in Niflheim, Loki tells him to find Ymir, Lord of the Jötun and ruler of Niflheim. After a long battle, Thor finds and defeats Ymir inside the Cave of Ages. There, Thor finds the source of a power that, as Loki says, can destroy the entire realm of Niflheim. Ignoring Ymir's warnings, Thor activates the source, which transforms into a golden, metallic, minotaur-like creature known as Mangog that instantly vaporizes Ymir. Loki then sends an unaware (and guilt-ridden) Thor to Vanaheim rather than Asgard, as Thor wanted. Loki (who wants to prove himself to Odin as a rightful heir to Asgard's throne) had previously struck a deal with Ulik (Lord of the Vanir-trolls and ruler of Vanaheim) for him to "delay" Thor's return to Asgard, whilst Loki stops Mangog. In exchange, Loki promised to repair Vanaheim's Frostgrinder (the Vanir's faulty replica of the Bifrost) and allow Ulik to leave Vanaheim.

While Thor makes his way through Vanaheim, back in Asgard, Mangog wreaks havoc throughout the city. Loki tries to stop Mangog, using the Casket of Ancient Winters from Niflheim. His plan backfires, as Mangog easily breaks free from the ice due to the fire it emits. Mangog summons an army of Jötun and Infernir, forcing Loki to change his plans and ask Ulik to allow Thor to use the Frostgrinder. However, Ulik (having waited to leave Vanaheim for decades) betrays Loki. Thor, meanwhile, reaches the doors of the Frostgrinder. There, he discovers, through a historical record of Vanaheim, that Odin created Mangog after the Vanir declared war against Asgard. The Vanir were unable to control and defeat Mangog, but they found out that Mangog's only weakness is a god-created mineral called Scabrite (which was used by Odin to forge the chains used to restrain Mangog) Thor eventually confronts and defeats Ulik. As Loki tells Thor about the state of Asgard, Thor reveals Mangog's only possible weakness to Loki. Loki informs Thor that Scabrite can only be found in one realm: Muspelheim, home of the Infernir.

Thor then travels to Muspelheim, where he faces Surtur, Lord of the Infernir and ruler of Muspelheim. Thor manages to defeat Surtur and claims the Twilight Sword. Thor destroys the Twilight Sword, whose energy is absorbed by Mjolnir.

Thor then returns to Asgard, where Loki tells him that before he faces Mangog, he has to help Heimdall and a fully recovered Sif retake the Bifrost's observatory. After Thor successfully helps Heimdall and Sif, he goes to face Mangog in combat, aided by Loki and a weakened Odin. After a long fight, Thor defeats Mangog. He apologizes to Odin for releasing Mangog out of anger and pride, but Odin says he should apologize, as he created Mangog in the first place. Odin releases the souls of the Vanir trapped within Mangog (which also gave Mangog power) to their fate in the afterlife.

== Gameplay ==
Thor battles through the numerous worlds of Norse mythology to save Asgard. The player uses Mjölnir, Thor's hammer, to fight enemies of an immense scale while controlling the elemental storm powers of lightning, thunder, and wind to vanquish enemies. Thor must overcome foes derived from the comics, including Ulik, Ymir and Surtur as well as other enemies. There are also a variety of collectibles to be found and collected, including Runes, Concept Arts, and alternate Thor costumes.

== Development and marketing ==
News that Sega was developing a Thor video game first leaked to the public in September 2009, Sega announced the game in July 2010. At the 2010 New York Comic Con, Matt Powers, the senior producer of the game, stated that Thor: God of Thunder would expand on the universe created by the Thor film and include characters such as Surtur and Ulik. Actors Chris Hemsworth and Tom Hiddleston who played Thor and Loki respectively in the film lent their voices and likenesses to the game. Gary Knight, Senior Vice President of Marketing at SEGA Europe and SEGA of America described the decision: "Bringing in Chris and Tom to star in Thor: God of Thunder gives us AAA talent that will create a truly cinematic interactive experience... [the] Mighty Thor and the trickster Loki will face off with real emotion while giving fans visual and vocal continuity between the video game and film adaptations of the Marvel franchise". Sega cancelled the PlayStation Portable edition of the game without any explanation. The first gameplay trailer debuted at the 2010 Spike Video Game Awards.

Red Fly Studios, a developer studio known for developing Wii versions of licensed properties, such as Ghostbusters: The Video Game (2009) and Star Wars: The Force Unleashed II (2010), accepted the role of developing the Wii and 3DS version of God of Thunder, in hopes of utilizing and expanding their experience with developing Wii games. These versions use the Infernal Engine, specifically the one that was used for Unleashed II. This is evident because the Wii version uses a heads-up display and quick-time event prompts similar to those used in Unleashed II.

== Reception ==
Reception

Aggregate score
Aggregator	Score				
Aggregator	3DS	DS	PS3	Wii	Xbox 360
Metacritic	55/100	64/100	39/100	56/100	38/100

Review scores
Publication	Score				
Publication	3DS	DS	PS3	Wii	Xbox 360
1Up.com	N/A	N/A	D	C+	D
Eurogamer	N/A	N/A	3/10	N/A	N/A
Game Informer	N/A	N/A	4.5/10	N/A	4.5/10
GamePro	N/A	2.5/5	1.5/5	N/A	1.5/5
GameRevolution	N/A	C−	B	C	B
GameSpot	N/A	5.5/10	2/10	5.5/10	2/10
GameTrailers	N/A	N/A	N/A	N/A	4/10
GameZone	N/A	7/10	N/A	7/10	3/10
IGN	6/10	8/10	3/10	6/10	3/10
Nintendo Power	6/10	6/10	N/A	5.5/10	N/A
Official Xbox Magazine (US)	N/A	N/A	N/A	N/A	4.5/10
PlayStation: The Official Magazine	N/A	N/A	2/10	N/A	N/A
The Guardian	N/A	N/A	3/5	N/A	N/A
Metro	N/A	6/10	N/A	N/A	3/10

The Nintendo versions received "mixed" reviews, while the non-Nintendo versions received "negative" reviews, according to the review aggregation website Metacritic.

Brett Day of 411Mania gave the DS version 8/10 and said it was "quite possibly the best movie game I have ever played. WayForward has managed to create a fantastic, classic 2D, side-scrolling game, which shows that the Nintendo DS still has some tricks left up its sleeves. The visuals are excellent, the sound is great, and the gameplay is simply outstanding. You will have hours of fun playing this. Thor is easily one of the best action games on the DS, and is a must have for any fans of action games". However, Jeffrey Harris of the same website gave the PS3 version 3.8/10 and said: "I love Thor, but this is not a videogame worthy of the God of Thunder. I wish the development team that gave us Spider-Man and Spider-Man 2 would come back together and make all the Marvel comic movie games, because this does not cut it. Raven Software did a decent job with [X-Men Origins: Wolverine], so they could be an option. If this is what we have to wait for with The Avengers movie videogame, I'm not very excited". The Guardian gave the same PS3 version 3/5 and said that "while it's energetic fun in parts, there's a series of near-vertical blips where the learning curve should be".

David Jenkins of Metro gave the DS version 6/10 and stated, "gorgeous 2D art still can't forgive the needless repetition, but while the novelty lasts this is a great little brain dead brawler". However, Roger Hargreaves, also of Metro, gave the Xbox 360 version 3/10 and called it "an almost blasphemous waste of the thunder god's potential, in this predictably cheap and cheerless movie tie-in". The A.V. Club gave the DS version a C+ and stated: "There are inspired moments here, especially in the game's boss fights—the final two involve multi-jointed sprites spanning both screens—but they're few and far between". The Digital Fix gave the 3DS version 5/10 and said that "the game shows great promise in a number of areas. The problem is many of these areas retain said promise for only a short while (and not just because the game itself is short)". The Escapist gave the Xbox 360 version 2/5 and said it was "just disappointing".
