= Tegel's Mercenaries =

1992 video game

- Developer: Mindcraft
- Publisher: Mindcraft
- Platform: MS-DOS
- Release: 1992
- Genre: Real-time tactics
- Mode: Single-player

Tegel's Mercenaries is a real-time tactics video game developed by Mindcraft and released for MS-DOS in 1992. It was followed by Strike Squad in 1993.

== Gameplay ==
The player controls a corporate military officer in the employ of the gruff General Tegel, and battles various criminal forces and alien threats. The player hires and equips a squad of soldiers, each of whom possesses distinct statistical combat specialties, and directs them in combat situations against various hostile humans, robots, and aliens.

The game was released without several features that were described in the game's manual and in screenshots, such as intra-squad conflict stemming from divided loyalties and cybernetic upgrades to the soldiers. Furthermore, the game balance was lopsided in favor of the player thanks to poor enemy artificial intelligence (AI) and overpowered weapons. In particular, the flamethrower-type weapons would often deal five times as much damage as a conventional laser weapon, which would have a much higher degree of accuracy.

== Plot ==
The game's plot follows the player's exposure of a human conspiracy that leads to a planned invasion by insectoid aliens. Ultimately, the player's squad travels to the aliens' homeworld, destroys their queen (whose design is lifted from Alien), and seemingly thwarts the invasion. Then, in the final cutscene, Tegel reveals himself as an alien in disguise. He was manipulating the player into assisting the aliens all along, and the final mission on their homeworld was supposed to have been a suicide mission.

== Reception ==
Reception

Review score
Publication	Score
Computer Gaming World	Tegel's Mercenaries 2/5; Strike Squad 1/5

While approving of Tegel's Mercenaries's graphics Computer Gaming World criticized the user interface, collision detection, and combat, calling the latter "the most frustrating aspect of the game". The magazine stated of Strike Squad that "If you were a fan of Tegel's, then consider your day made". It criticized the imbalanced combat and the two-player mode's "flawed implementation", concluding that "All the strengths of its predecessor are included in this un-sequel, but unfortunately most of the weaknesses also remain". A February 1994 survey of space war games gave both games a grade of C−, stating that Tegel's had no replay value and AI characters in both games only had "a rudimentary intelligence". A May 1994 survey of strategic space games set in the year 2000 and later gave Tegel's two stars out of five and Strike Squad one star, stating that "there are better games of this type out there".

== Legacy ==
A sequel, Tegel's Mercenaries 2, was advertised in the Mindcraft in-house catalog that was packaged with several contemporary Mindcraft games. In 1993, Mindcraft published Strike Squad. Although the publisher, advertisements, box art, and documentation did not mention any connection, Computer Gaming World stated that "Strike Squad is indeed the sequel to Tegel's Mercenaries, completely and directly ... The story follows directly on the heels of development and revelations" in the earlier game.
