= Outcast: A New Beginning =

- Developer: Appeal Studios
- Publisher: THQ Nordic
- Engine: Unreal Engine 4
- Platforms: PlayStation 5; Windows; Xbox Series X/S
- Release: WW: 15 March 2024
- Genre: Action-adventure
- Mode: Single-player

Outcast: A New Beginning is a 2024 action-adventure game developed by Appeal Studios and published by THQ Nordic. It is a sequel to 1999's Outcast. Players help defend an alien civilization while searching for their missing daughter. The game was released for PlayStation 5, Windows, and Xbox Series X/S on 15 March 2024 to mixed reviews from critics.

== Gameplay ==
Players control Cutter Slade, the protagonist of Outcast. Slade has had his memory wiped and does not remember his previous adventures. While attempting to find his missing daughter, he helps the Talans, a race native to the planet Adelpha, repel an invasion. This is done by performing fetch quests, talking to non-player characters, and fighting robots. Slade is equipped with a jetpack, and his weapons can be customized and upgraded in various ways. If Slade dies, he respawns nearby. Outcast: A New Beginning has an open world that can be explored, and fast travel can be used to teleport to areas already visited.

== Development and release ==
On 17 September 2021, THQ Nordic announced Outcast 2: A New Beginning. In August 2023, the game was renamed to Outcast: A New Beginning. The game was released for PlayStation 5, Windows, and Xbox Series X/S on 15 March 2024. It was developed by the same team that made the first game, Belgian developer Appeal Studios.

== Reception ==
Reception

Aggregate scores
Aggregator	Score
Metacritic	(PC) 69/100 (PS5) 68/100 (XSX) 72/100
OpenCritic	34% recommend

Review scores
Publication	Score
Famitsu	31/40
Hardcore Gamer	4/5
IGN	7/10
PC Gamer (US)	69/100
Push Square	5/10
Shacknews	8/10

Outcast: A New Beginning received "mixed or average" reviews from critics, according to review aggregator website Metacritic. Fellow review aggregator OpenCritic assessed that the game received fair approval, being recommended by 34% of critics. In Japan, four critics from Famitsu gave the game a total score of 31 out of 40.

Although they criticized it for having "overly long questlines filled with busywork" and dialogue that is "goofy sci-fi babble", IGN recommended it to fans of open world games on the strength of its freedom and exploration. Rock Paper Shotgun said it is a beautiful alien world "filled with open world busy work" and cringe-worthy dialogue. They also criticized what they felt was a white savior narrative. PC Gamer's reviewer felt Slade, who appeared to be middle-aged in the game, would appeal to older gamers given both his old-fashioned design and the game itself. Push Square likewise thought people hungry for mid-2000s era action-adventure games might enjoy it, but they said there were too many other, better options today. They also experienced technical issues on the PlayStation 5.
