= Ambush at Sorinor =

1993 video game

- Developer: Mindcraft
- Publisher: Mindcraft
- Designer: Larry Froistad
- Platform: MS-DOS
- Release: 1993
- Genre: Strategy

Ambush at Sorinor is a video game released by Mindcraft in 1993 for MS-DOS. It is a sequel to Siege from 1992. It is made with the same game engine as Siege. It takes place in the same universe as The Magic Candle.

== Gameplay ==
In the game six rival clans vie for the control of the realm. The player controls a mercenary leader who assembles fighters for missions.

== Reception ==
Reception

Review scores
Publication	Score
PC Games (DE)	81/100
PC Player (DE)	56/100
Power Play (DE)	77%

H.E. Dille of Computer Gaming World gave a negative review and summarized: "The folks at Mindcraft are a decent lot, who genuinely try to provide gamers with what they want. Given that, one can only hope that they go back to the drawing board with this engine before releasing another title of similar ilk. In addition to the tactical model, they must also invest a lot of time in refining the AI that controls the computer opponent. It was not uncommon for VIP groups to continue blindly into my Ambushers rather than trying to go around or even fleeing until escort help could arrive. With that kind of AI, one wonders who is getting ambushed in Ambush at Sorinor, the computer troops or the purchaser of the game? Unfortunately, there are too many occasions when it feels like the latter".

Jim Trunzo reviewed Ambush at Sorinor in White Wolf #38 (1993), giving it a final evaluation of "Good" and stated that "Ambush at Sorinor's graphics vary from good (the actual battle icons) to excellent (the full-screen displays). Sound is so-so. Campaign play leaves something to be desired; however, individual scenarios are great fun. A strong tutorial allows easy assimilation of the impressive game mechanics."
