= The Keys to Maramon =

1990 video game

- Developer: Knight Tech
- Publisher: Mindcraft
- Platforms: Amiga, Commodore 64, MS-DOS
- Release: 1990
- Genre: Role-playing

The Keys to Maramon is a video game published by Mindcraft in 1990 for MS-DOS. It takes place in the same universe as The Magic Candle.

== Plot ==
The Keys to Maramon is an adventure role-playing game where the mission of the characters is to rescue the town of Maramon. Initially, the player can choose from one of several adventurers who have different strengths and weaknesses. The protagonist begins by accepting a position from the mayor of Maramon to protect the town from monsters. The daytime is peaceful and can be spent exploring or resting to recover health. Every night, monsters come from some of the towers and attempt to loot and pillage Maramon. Initially, the player doesn't have any keys to access the locked towers, but by carefully searching and fighting, the player can discover the keys. The towers contain some mysteries, treasure, and ultimately the "source" of the monsters. The game is won by exploring the towers and eliminating the source, which will end the relentless nightly cycle of monster attacks.

== Release ==
As a copy protection method, the player is prompted at several points for specific words from the instruction manual.

== Reception ==
Computer Gaming World stated that Maramon was "not an epic quest for the jaded adventurer", but a "manageable quest for new adventurers" despite, or because of, its short length. The game was reviewed in 1990 in Dragon #163 by Hartley, Patricia, and Kirk Lesser in "The Role of Computers" column. The reviewers gave the game 3 out of 5 stars.
