= Battle Realms: Winter of the Wolf =

2002 video game

- Developer: Liquid Entertainment
- Publishers: Ubi Soft; Crave Entertainment
- Platform: Microsoft Windows
- Release: NA: November 5, 2002; EU: November 29, 2002
- Genre: Real-time strategy
- Modes: Single-player, multiplayer

Battle Realms: Winter of the Wolf is an expansion pack for the real-time strategy video game Battle Realms, developed by Liquid Entertainment and co-published by Ubi Soft and Crave Entertainment. The game was announced on July 7, 2002, and released on November 5, 2002, in North America.

== Synopsis ==
Winter of the Wolf features exclusively new units and other gameplay elements, such as snow-terrain maps. Shown here, the Battle Maidens are the new armies and a Zen Master, Teppo, from the Dragon clan's arsenal.

The martial arts-themed RTS takes place seven years prior to the events in the first game.

The story begins with Grayback, the last heir to the Wolf clan's throne, explaining that long ago that life was better for their clan before the storms came and drowned their paradise. (Home island) They were saved from death by their druidess order using their clan's most sacred treasure the white wolf's skull, given to them by their clan's totem, the white wolf.

The skull guided them to the lands of the Serpent empire where their new neighbors the Serpent and Lotus clan welcomed them as allies but unfortunately they trusted them. Thinking that their lives seemed simple and good again little did they know that Lord Zymeth of the Lotus clan made a deal with the Serpent emperor and attacked them by surprise. The Serpent clan looked away as the Lotus burned their towns and killed their people, many wolvesmen tried to fight back but were unsuccessful, the survivors of the battle became slaves in the Lotus shale mines, ever since then Grayback trained his fellow miners in the arts of war, led them to rebellion and struggle for freedom from the grip of their slave master Mistress Yvaine.

Grayback and some slaves had the chance to escape slavery from the shale mines, and formed new equipment along with reinforcements led by Longtooth, Grayback's old friend. With the successful escape of Grayback and his Wolfmen, they recruited fellow clans to aid their war. Soon they rallied around different Lotus and Serpent camps and destroyed them one by one.

== Reception ==
Reception

Aggregate scores
| Aggregator | Score |
|---|---|
| GameRankings | 66.67% |
| Metacritic | 71 out of 100 |

Review scores
| Publication | Score |
|---|---|
| 1Up.com | 2 out of 5 |
| GameSpot | 7.3 out of 10 |
| GameZone | 8.5 out of 10 |
| IGN | 7.5 out of 10 |
| PC Gamer (US) | 68% |
| X-Play | 3 out of 5 |
| ActionTrip | 8.1 out of 10 |

Battle Realms: Winter of the Wolf received "mixed or average," according to review aggregator Metacritic, based on reviews from 10 professional critics. Greg Kasavin from GameSpot criticized the chaotic combat and difficulty "to keep track of what's happening in the game's large-scale battles," limited user interface, relatively "small unit counts" and "limited base defenses," and lack of "any huge changes to the original;" rating the game 7.3 out of 10. Similarly, IGN's Dan Adams rated it 7.5 out of 10, claiming that "levels can be unimaginative and the character development and dialogue are uninspired," and didn't like the "short overall campaign." GameZone gave it 8.5 out of 10, the highest of all reviews.

Winter of the Wolf was packaged with the original game in North America for $29.99, with a $10 rebate offer for those who already owned Battle Realms. It was also sold separately.
