= Bloodstone: An Epic Dwarven Tale =

1993 video game

- Developer: Mindcraft Software, Inc.
- Publishers: Mindcraft Software, Inc.
- Engine: Magic Candle III engine
- Platform: MS-DOS
- Release: 1993
- Genre: Role-playing video game
- Mode: Single-player

Bloodstone is a 1993 high fantasy role-playing video game developed and published by Mindcraft Software. The game is a prequel to The Magic Candle series and uses the Magic Candle III engine.

== Plot summary ==
The game begins with a cut scene of the main character's clan being attacked by the vicious Taldor (default name "Danat" if male, or "Danta" if female). Then the players choose three members for the party and the game begins.

The Taldor are goblin-like creatures who seem to be cursed with violent bloodlust. The main objective of the game is to retrieve Khamalkhad and join the warring tribes of the North and South.

The game employs an interesting pantheon of gods. The player can go to the resting points of the sleeping gods and receive a permanent skill increase by whispering a prayer to them. The game employs creatures like the Tlengle (Lizardfolk), Humans, Dwarves, Talador, Wizards, and Amazons. Magic is done in an odd way; the amount of a specific spell numbers one to ninety-nine. As the player casts a spell they use up one "use" when they run out of uses they either forget the spell or buy a totem, to learn the specific spell by assigning the character to study the magic.

== Reception ==
Computer Gaming World's Scorpia in 1993 stated that Bloodstone had "some minor flaws that, but all together, a seriously distracting experience". She concluded that the game was "a thorough enjoyment ... that dedicated Magic Candle fans" would also want to play.

James Trunzo reviewed Bloodstone in White Wolf #39 (1994), giving it a final evaluation of "Good" and stated that "Bloodstone pays attention to many roleplaying qualities ignored by other games. Don't try to cross a desert in furs or brave icy mountain peaks without them unless you want to die. Training, employment and other real-life aspects make Bloodstone more than just a hack and slay product."
