= Siege (video game) =

1992 video game

- Developer: Mindcraft
- Publisher: Mindcraft
- Platform: MS-DOS
- Release: 1992
- Genre: Strategy
- Modes: Single-player, multiplayer

Siege is a video game released by Mindcraft in 1992 for MS-DOS. An expansion pack, Dogs of War, was released. It added multiplayer, six new castles, and 16 new units to the game. A sequel, Ambush at Sorinor, was released in 1993.

== Plot ==
Set in the world of Mindcraft's The Magic Candle, Siege is a castle-combat war game in which the player controls either the hordes of darkness (including orcs, trolls, domugs, and tekhirs) or the warriors of good (humans, dwarves, and elves), in a campaign in Western Gurtex that involves either attacking or defending one of its four castles. The player manages elite troops, berserkers, sergeants, and engineers, as well as assault and defense equipment (such as ballistae, burning oil, battering rams, mobile bridges, siege towers, assault ladders, and catapults) and magicians who use spells against the enemy. The game features 24 different scenarios, and comes with an editor to allow the players to create new scenarios or alter the ones included in the game.

== Reception ==
Reception

Review score
Publication	Score
Pelit	89/100; 90/100 (Dogs of War)

Computer Gaming World in 1992 complimented Siege's "beautifully rendered" VGA graphics and scenario editor, and approved of it being the first game based on castle warfare. The magazine criticized the lack of detail in win conditions and a too-predictable AI opponent, but concluded that the game "is an all-around unique and engaging simulation ... If the computer AI had more of a cruel streak, the game would be outstanding". In a 1993 survey of pre 20th-century strategy games the magazine gave the game two-plus stars out of five. The game was reviewed in 1993 in Dragon #189 by Hartley, Patricia, and Kirk Lesser in "The Role of Computers" column. The reviewers gave the game 4 out of 5 stars.

Niko Nirvi of Pelit summarized: "AI is a bit weak, but the violence, playability and digitized effects make this an excellent strategy game". He reviewed the expansion and said: "The best thing about Dogs of War is the opportunity to play Siege against other human players. Wow!" and also praised the improved AI.

Jim Trunzo reviewed Siege in White Wolf #34 (Jan./Feb., 1993), rating it a 4 out of 5 and stated that "Ultimately, Siege delivers what it promises. As the attacker, you'll be in your glory as you rain arrows at defenders in order to protect your troops who are scaling ladders placed by your engineers. As the defender, you'll experience equal amounts of glee as you direct your troops to pour boiling oil on savage troll troops trying to breach your walls, and heart-pounding excitement as you send your hero-led troops on a foray outside the castle walls to attack the catapult unit that is about to fire. In either case, your decisions will determine victory or defeat."
