= Battle Realms =

2001 video game

- North American cover art
- Developer: Liquid Entertainment
- Publisher: Crave Entertainment: EU: Ubi Soft
- Producer: Mike Givens
- Designers: Ed Del Castillo; Peter Bartholow; Brigand Green; Noah Tool
- Programmer: Michael Grayford
- Artist: Ed Del Castillo
- Composer: Matt Holle
- Platform: Windows
- Release: NA: November 8, 2001; EU: November 30, 2001
- Genre: Real-time strategy
- Modes: Single-player, multiplayer

Battle Realms is a real-time strategy video game published and released by Crave Entertainment and Ubi Soft in November 2001. It was the first game created by Liquid Entertainment. An expansion pack Battle Realms: Winter of the Wolf was released in November 2002. In 2012, the game was re-released on GOG.com. In 2019, the game was re-released on Steam as Battle Realms: Zen Edition, in its early access state with functioning online multiplayer.

== Gameplay ==
The clan's allies are in combat destroying the other clans' opposition. ( the screenshot is taken from the expansion)

Battle Realms' gameplay is like many other real-time strategy games. There are several factions which all have various types of available structures and units to produce. Unlike other real-time strategy games though, the basic worker units (peasants), which are used for resource gathering and construction, also act as the base unit to be upgraded into military units. Thus, military buildings in Battle Realms are used for transforming and upgrading units rather than producing them directly, as peasants are the only units that can be produced outright: they must be trained in a military building and later converted into basic or advanced warrior units depending on the building in order to the player to build their army.

Peasants gather three resources in the game: rice, water and horses. Horses are war units (Optional Resources) that can be used to combine with other military units i.e. riding or can be turned into pack horses when assigned for peasants. Another unusual trait is unit generation, where peasants are produced automatically at no cost. The rate at which new peasants are produced is inversely proportionate to the current population of the player's army.

All factions start off with three basic training structures which produce units along different paths of warfare, such as melee or ranged combat. In most cases, units can be trained in three different structures to produce more highly skilled infantry or Battle Gears (commonly abbreviated as BGs) to improve their combat ability. This allows lower tiered units to defeat higher tier units, which they could not normally defeat. BGs also allow the player to further define the role of a unit, such as damage absorption, building destruction, or reconnaissance.

Another key element of Battle Realms is the Yin/Yang system. Each army obtains points of Yin or Yang when in combat, depending on their moral alliance to the forces of light or darkness. Hero units, or Zen Masters, require Yin/Yang to be summoned and increase their damage. Yin and Yang are also used by structures in the faction's base for military upgrades. The rate of Yin/Yang growth depends on the strength and flair of the army and how far they are from the main base.

=== Factions ===
There are four available factions, called clans in Battle Realms, and each has a different philosophy towards life and combat:

- The Dragon clan is a race of warriors who favor honorable and valorous combat.
- The Wolf clan is a race of formerly enslaved miners. Their clan members live basic, healthy lives, and their culture emphasizes strong ties to nature. Their former enslavement allowed them to develop armor made from the shale they used to mine.
- The Serpent clan is the remnant of the old Dragon clan which uses stealth, trickery, and brutality to further its goals. Unlike their predecessors, they have mastered weapon technology to a certain extent (especially gunpowder) and has also dabbled into necromancy. This is the original and dominant clan before the fall of The Serpent himself.
- The Lotus clan is an ancient group of sorcerers that delves deeply into the corrupting aspects of magic. They were also the clan that enslaved the Wolf clan and used to serve the Serpent clan.

Unlike most strategy games, all units in Battle Realms have a melee attack, however, missile units typically have drastically weaker melee attacks. Units are very detailed and have distinct fighting animations. Units can dodge projectiles if they run fast enough, and projectiles have different speeds and fire at certain angles.

A unit's attack has a property - either cutting, piercing, blunt, explosive, magic, or fire, as well as a bonus damage against buildings. The property of a unit's missile attack may also differ from its melee attack. Most units have resistances to particular properties and weaknesses to others. For example, the Dragon Samurai has excellent resistance against cutting attacks, but has a poor resistance to explosive and magic damage.

== Plot ==
In single-player, the plot mainly revolves around Kenji, the last heir to the Serpent's Throne. When he returns from exile, Kenji comes across bandits raiding a peasant village. From there, he can either save the peasants or help the bandits in killing them. If he chooses to save the peasants, he will follow the path of the Dragon clan. If he aids the bandits, he will follow the path of the Serpent clan.

In Kenji's Journey, the player may choose which territories he or she wishes to attack first. (Otomo, his lieutenant, gives you the options.) When Kenji returns from Malcomson, he must decide whether to rebirth the Dragon Clan and save the peasants honor with righteousness or take up reigns in his brother's and his father, Lord Oja's, footsteps and lead the Serpent Clan. Taking specific territories might give benefits, and other Zen Masters may join Kenji. Later on, the player can summon these Zen Masters from the Keep. The story focuses on an artifact Called Tarrant's Orb/Orb of the Serpent which Kenji and the other clans are seeking out. Kenji must get to the Orb before them.

There are four clans in the game: Dragon Clan, Serpent Clan, Wolf Clan, and Lotus Clan, each with their own motivations. The ancient Dragon Clan prizes honor above everything else and because of their devotion to such ideals, the Dragon deity assists them during times of great peril. The Serpent Clan, followers of Yin, have forgotten their honorable ways and have resorted to thievery and deceit. Wolf Clansmen prizes freedom above all else, while also being down-to-earth, hardworking people, and take a delight in nature. Lotus clansmen follow the Forbidden Path, which focuses on death and decay.

== Reception ==
Reception

Aggregate scores
Aggregator	Score
GameRankings	82.04%
Metacritic	82/100

Review scores
Publication	Score
AllGame	4/5
Computer and Video Games	8/10
Edge	7/10
GameSpot	8.7/10
GameSpy	85%
GameZone	8/10
IGN	8.7/10
PC Gamer (US)	70%
PC Zone	86%
X-Play	4/5
FHM	3/5
ActionTrip	9/10

The game was met with positive reception upon release, as GameRankings gave it a score of 82.04%, while Metacritic gave it 82 out of 100.

Igromania magazine gave the game 9 out of 10, calling it an "ideal contemporary Real-time strategy". The reviewer noted good gameplay and praised the graphics and animations, but he said the game did not deviate much from traditional RTSes and the AI did not stand out.

The Academy of Interactive Arts & Sciences nominated Battle Realms for the "PC Strategy" award in 2002, which was ultimately awarded to Civilization III.

== Expansion ==
Battle Realms: Winter of the Wolf is the expansion pack, announced on July 7, 2002 and released on November 5, 2002.

== Remaster ==
After under 6 years in early access development, the new remastered edition, Battle Realms: Zen Edition, was fully released on Steam PC on January 27, 2025. It also added themed Steam Trading Cards for Steam users to collect. The remaster includes the base game and Winter of the Wolf expansion; improved graphics including widescreen resolutions & dual monitor support; and numerous bug fixes.
