= List of Project EGG games =

Project EGG is an emulation-based video game distribution service for Windows operating systems - originally launched by Bothtec on November 24, 2001, and now managed by D4 Enterprise.

There have been a total of 1173 titles added to the service, originating from across 23 different platforms. However, 102 of these titles (including all titles for the Neo Geo and SG-1000 platforms) have since been delisted and are thus no longer available for purchase. (Note: Delisted titles are still available to be re-downloaded and played by Project EGG subscribers who had purchased the titles before they were delisted.)

The following is a mostly-comprehensive list of all titles released on Project EGG, sorted by platform and release date:

== FM-7 ==
The FM-7 was a Japanese home computer released by Fujitsu in 1982 - and FM-7 games started to be made available through Project EGG on November 24, 2001.

There are currently 26 original FM-7 titles available on Project EGG:

No.	Title	Release date	Original rightsholder	Original release	Ref.
1	Super Warrior Zaider	November 24, 2001	Cosmos Computer	1986	
1	Super Warrior Zaider	July 9, 2021 (Note: Re-released as part of a special publisher themed bundle to commemorate Project EGG reaching 1000 titles. Delisted on November 8, 2021.)	Cosmos Computer	1986	
1	Super Warrior Zaider	September 28, 2021 (Note: Updated version for compatibility with Windows 10, which was the latest version of Windows at this time.)	Cosmos Computer	1986	
1	Super Warrior Zaider	January 24, 2022 (Note: Special free version that was as part of a year-long celebration to commemorate Project EGG's 20th anniversary. Delisted after one month.)	Cosmos Computer	1986	
2	Hydlide II: Shine of Darkness	November 24, 2001	T&E Soft	1985	
2	Hydlide II: Shine of Darkness	September 29, 2015	T&E Soft	1985	
3	Hot Dog	February 25, 2002 (Note: This version is still available on Project EGG (as of April 22, 2023), despite a newer version existing.)	Bothtec	1986	
3	Hot Dog	January 29, 2010	Bothtec	1986	
4	Volguard	September 1, 2002	dB-SOFT	1984	
5	Hydlide	September 1, 2002	T&E Soft	1985	
6	Daisenryaku FM	August 1, 2003	System Soft	1987	
7	Jelda	January 24, 2006	Carry Lab	1984	
7	Jelda	July 9, 2021	Carry Lab	1984	
7	Jelda	March 24, 2022	Carry Lab	1984	
8	Jelda II	February 7, 2006	Carry Lab	1984	
8	Jelda II	July 9, 2021	Carry Lab	1984	
8	Jelda II	November 24, 2021	Carry Lab	1984	
9	Manhattan Requiem: Angels Flying in the Dark	May 23, 2006	Riverhillsoft	1987	
10	Kiss of Murder	June 13, 2006	Riverhillsoft	1988	
11	Miracle Warriors: Seal of the Dark Lord	June 20, 2006	Kogado Studio	October 1986	
12	Thexder	July 4, 2006	Game Arts	1985	
12	Thexder	June 29, 2021	Game Arts	1985	
13	Star Arthur Densetsu I: Wakusei Mephius	July 11, 2006	T&E Soft	July 1983	
13	Star Arthur Densetsu I: Wakusei Mephius	August 8, 2023 (Note: Updated version for compatibility with Windows 11, which was the latest version of Windows at this time.)	T&E Soft	July 1983	
14	Star Arthur Densetsu II: Dark Nebula	August 29, 2006	T&E Soft	1983	
15	Star Arthur Densetsu III: Terra 4001	September 5, 2006	T&E Soft	1984	
16	Xanadu: Dragon Slayer II	December 28, 2006	Nihon Falcom	January 7, 1986	
17	Cyber Suikoden	February 20, 2007	HOT-B	1987	
18	Relics	November 20, 2007	Bothtec	1986	
18	Relics	December 6, 2011	Bothtec	1986	
19	The Palms	March 18, 2014	HummingBirdSoft	1983	
19	The Palms	September 2, 2019	HummingBirdSoft	1983	
20	The Knight of Wonderland	October 28, 2014	HummingBirdSoft	1983	
20	The Knight of Wonderland	July 9, 2021	HummingBirdSoft	1983	
20	The Knight of Wonderland	June 24, 2022	HummingBirdSoft	1983	
21	A Ressha de Ikō: A-Train	May 26, 2015	Artdink	1985	
22	Märchen Veil	January 12, 2021	System Sacom	1987	
22	Märchen Veil	December 24, 2021	System Sacom	1987	
23	Phantom Heart II	July 20, 2021	Xtalsoft	1986	
23	Phantom Heart II	June 24, 2022	Xtalsoft	1986	
24	Topple Zip	January 4, 2022	Bothtec	1987	
25	ABYSS	January 11, 2022	HummingBirdSoft	1984	
26	Babylon	June 21, 2022	Xtalsoft	1987	

== FM77AV ==
The FM77AV was a Japanese home computer released by Fujitsu in 1985, as an upgraded version of their earlier FM-7 platform - and FM77AV games started to be made available through Project EGG on November 24, 2001.

There have been 12 FM77AV titles available on Project EGG, 1 of which is no longer available for purchase:

No.	Title	Release date	Original rightsholder	Original release	Ref.
1	Laydock	November 24, 2001	T&E Soft	November 1986	
1	Laydock	February 25, 2022	T&E Soft	November 1986	
2	Ys I: Ancient Ys Vanished	March 24, 2002	Nihon Falcom	1987	
2	Ys I: Ancient Ys Vanished	December 28, 2006	Nihon Falcom	1987	
2	Ys I: Ancient Ys Vanished	August 12, 2014 (Note: Updated version for compatibility with Windows 8.1, which was one of the latest versions of Windows at this time.)	Nihon Falcom	1987	
3	Ys II: Ancient Ys Vanished – The Final Chapter	April 24, 2002	Nihon Falcom	1988	
3	Ys II: Ancient Ys Vanished – The Final Chapter	December 28, 2006	Nihon Falcom	1988	
3	Ys II: Ancient Ys Vanished – The Final Chapter	August 12, 2014	Nihon Falcom	1988	
4	How Many Robot	October 1, 2002	Artdink	1988	
5	Luxsor: Nights Over Egypt	January 10, 2003	Nihon Telenet	1987	
6	Amber Testament	January 10, 2003	Riverhillsoft	1988	
7	Woody Poco	February 10, 2003	dB-SOFT	1987	
8	Silpheed: Super Dogfighter	February 10, 2003	Game Arts	1988	
9	Death Force	July 29, 2003	Riverhillsoft	1987	
10	Fire Ball	February 4, 2004	HummingBirdSoft	1987	
10	Fire Ball	July 9, 2021	HummingBirdSoft	1987	
10	Fire Ball	November 24, 2021	HummingBirdSoft	1987	
11	~~Daiva Story 2: Memory in Durga~~ (delisted) (Note: Only available as part of a bundle.)	December 23, 2005 (Note: As part of a bundle) (Note: Originally released on AC PLUS / EGG Plus, before that service was merged into Project EGG.)	T&E Soft		
12	Dires -giger・loop-	August 26, 2014	Bothtec	1987	
12	Dires -giger・loop-	May 7, 2019	Bothtec	1987	

== PC-8801 ==
The PC-8801 was a Japanese home computer released by NEC in 1981 - and original PC-8801 games (as opposed to titles from later revisions of the platform) started to be made available through Project EGG on November 24, 2001.

There have been 184 original PC-8801 titles available on Project EGG, 25 of which are no longer available for purchase:

No.	Title	Release date	Original rightsholder	Original release	Ref.
1	Relics	November 24, 2001	Bothtec	1986	
1	Relics	June 30, 2010	Bothtec	1986	
1	Relics	July 1, 2014	Bothtec	1986	
2	Topple Zip	November 24, 2001	Bothtec	1986	
2	Topple Zip	December 4, 2018	Bothtec	1986	
3	Courageous Perseus	November 24, 2001	Cosmos Computer	November 1984	
3	Courageous Perseus	January 7, 2020	Cosmos Computer	November 1984	
4	Kaleidoscope	November 24, 2001	HOT-B	1985	
5	Kaleidoscope 2: Sweating Planet	November 24, 2001	HOT-B	1986	
6	~~Psychic War: Cosmic Soldier 2~~ (delisted)	November 24, 2001	Kogado Studio		
7	Space-Time Bride	November 24, 2001	Kogado Studio	1988	
7	Space-Time Bride	June 10, 2014	Kogado Studio	1988	
8	Wings of Algis	November 24, 2001	Kogado Studio	1988	
8	Wings of Algis	April 28, 2015	Kogado Studio	1988	
9	~~Argo~~ (delisted)	November 24, 2001	Kure Software Koubou		
10	Harry Fox	November 24, 2001	Micro Cabin	1984	
10	Harry Fox	December 22, 2015	Micro Cabin	1984	
11	Harry Fox: Snow Demon King	November 24, 2001	Micro Cabin	1986	
11	Harry Fox: Snow Demon King	March 29, 2016	Micro Cabin	1986	
12	Xak II: Rising of the Redmoon	November 24, 2001	Micro Cabin	1990	
12	Xak II: Rising of the Redmoon	April 1, 2008	Micro Cabin	1990	
13	Xak: The Art of Visual Stage	November 24, 2001	Micro Cabin	1989	
13	Xak: The Art of Visual Stage	April 12, 2016	Micro Cabin	1989	
14	Romancia	November 24, 2001	Nihon Falcom	1986	
14	Romancia	December 28, 2006	Nihon Falcom	1986	
14	Romancia	October 21, 2014	Nihon Falcom	1986	
15	Xanadu	November 24, 2001	Nihon Falcom	1985	
15	Xanadu	January 8, 2013	Nihon Falcom	1985	
16	Xanadu Scenario II	November 24, 2001	Nihon Falcom	1986	
16	Xanadu Scenario II	January 8, 2013	Nihon Falcom	1986	
17	Kami no Seito	November 24, 2001	Panther Software	1989	
18	Zavaş	November 24, 2001	Popcom Soft	1988	
18	Zavaş	October 29, 2013	Popcom Soft	1988	
19	Amber Testament	November 24, 2001	Riverhillsoft	1988	
19	Amber Testament	October 13, 2015	Riverhillsoft	1988	
20	Dome	November 24, 2001	System Sacom	1988	
21	Märchen Veil	November 24, 2001	System Sacom	August 1985	
21	Märchen Veil	October 11, 2014	System Sacom	August 1985	
21	Märchen Veil	February 4, 2020	System Sacom	August 1985	
22	~~Providence~~ (delisted)	November 24, 2001	System Sacom		
23	Bouken Roman	November 24, 2001	System Soft	1986	
23	Bouken Roman	December 25, 2012	System Soft	1986	
24	Poor Story	November 24, 2001	System Soft	1987	
24	Poor Story	September 30, 2014	System Soft	1987	
25	Hydlide	November 24, 2001	T&E Soft	1984	
25	Hydlide	June 25, 2013	T&E Soft	1984	
26	Hydlide II: Shine of Darkness	November 24, 2001	T&E Soft	1985	
26	Hydlide II: Shine of Darkness	July 2, 2013	T&E Soft	1985	
27	Rune Worth: Black Prince	November 24, 2001	T&E Soft	1990	
27	Rune Worth: Black Prince	November 4, 2014	T&E Soft	1990	
28	Master of Monsters	December 22, 2001	System Soft	1988	
29	~~Babylon~~ (delisted)	December 22, 2001	Xtalsoft		
30	Crimson II: The Counterattack of the Evil God	December 22, 2001	Xtalsoft	1989	
30	Crimson II: The Counterattack of the Evil God	September 24, 2013	Xtalsoft	1989	
31	~~Phantom Heart III~~ (delisted)	December 22, 2001	Xtalsoft		
32	The Scheme	January 24, 2002	Bothtec	1988	
32	The Scheme	February 1, 2009	Bothtec	1988	
32	The Scheme	June 2, 2015	Bothtec	1988	
33	~~Lyrane~~ (delisted)	January 24, 2002	Bullet-Proof Software		
34	Seilane	January 24, 2002	Micro Cabin	1987	
34	Seilane	May 22, 2018	Micro Cabin	1987	
35	Ys III: Wanderers from Ys	January 24, 2002	Nihon Falcom	1989	
35	Ys III: Wanderers from Ys	December 28, 2006	Nihon Falcom	1989	
35	Ys III: Wanderers from Ys	December 23, 2014	Nihon Falcom	1989	
36	Varna	January 24, 2002	System Sacom	1989	
36	Varna	August 24, 2022	System Sacom	1989	
37	~~Lost Power~~ (delisted)	January 24, 2002	Winkysoft	June 1986	
37	~~Lost Power~~ (delisted)	October 18, 2016	Winkysoft	June 1986	
38	Fantasian	January 24, 2002	Xtalsoft	1985	
38	Fantasian	August 22, 2017	Xtalsoft	1985	
38	Fantasian	July 9, 2021	Xtalsoft	1985	
38	Fantasian	October 24, 2022	Xtalsoft	1985	
39	Laplace's Demon	February 25, 2002	HummingBirdSoft	1987	
39	Laplace's Demon	August 5, 2014	HummingBirdSoft	1987	
40	Taiyō no Shinden	February 25, 2002	Nihon Falcom	1986	
40	Taiyō no Shinden	December 28, 2006	Nihon Falcom	1986	
40	Taiyō no Shinden	February 28, 2017	Nihon Falcom	1986	
41	Ys II: Ancient Ys Vanished – The Final Chapter	February 25, 2002	Nihon Falcom	1988	
41	Ys II: Ancient Ys Vanished – The Final Chapter	December 28, 2006	Nihon Falcom	1988	
41	Ys II: Ancient Ys Vanished – The Final Chapter	November 27, 2018	Nihon Falcom	1988	
42	Hydlide 3: The Space Memories	February 25, 2002	T&E Soft	1987	
42	Hydlide 3: The Space Memories	October 27, 2015	T&E Soft	1987	
43	~~Advanced Fantasian: Quest for Lost Sanctuary~~ (delisted)	February 25, 2002	Xtalsoft		
44	~~Legend of the Galactic Heroes~~ (delisted)	March 24, 2002	Bothtec		
45	Silver Ghost	March 24, 2002	Kure Software Koubou	1988	
45	Silver Ghost	July 9, 2019	Kure Software Koubou	1988	
46	Dragon Slayer: Level 1.1	March 24, 2002	Nihon Falcom	1984	
46	Dragon Slayer: Level 1.1	December 28, 2006	Nihon Falcom	1984	
46	Dragon Slayer: Level 1.1	September 9, 2014	Nihon Falcom	1984	
47	Dragon Slayer: Level 2.0	March 24, 2002	Nihon Falcom	1984	
47	Dragon Slayer: Level 2.0	December 28, 2006	Nihon Falcom	1984	
47	Dragon Slayer: Level 2.0	September 9, 2014	Nihon Falcom	1984	
48	Madeleine	March 24, 2002	Thinking Rabbit	1987	
49	Dragon Slayer: The Legend of Heroes	April 24, 2002	Nihon Falcom	1989	
49	Dragon Slayer: The Legend of Heroes	February 24, 2009	Nihon Falcom	1989	
50	Laptick	May 24, 2002	dB-SOFT	1985	
51	Asteka	May 24, 2002	Nihon Falcom	1985	
51	Asteka	December 28, 2006	Nihon Falcom	1985	
51	Asteka	January 6, 2015	Nihon Falcom	1985	
52	Hadou no Hyouteki: Legend of the Melvel	May 24, 2002	Soft Studio Wing	1987	
53	Star Arthur Densetsu I: Wakusei Mephius	May 24, 2002	T&E Soft	1983	
53	Star Arthur Densetsu I: Wakusei Mephius	May 31, 2016	T&E Soft	1983	
54	Casablanca: Ni Ai wo Satsujinsha ha Jikuu wo Koete	May 24, 2002	Thinking Rabbit	1986	
54	Casablanca: Ni Ai wo Satsujinsha ha Jikuu wo Koete	October 10, 2017	Thinking Rabbit	1986	
55	Phantom Heart	May 24, 2002	Xtalsoft	March 1984	
55	Phantom Heart	July 21, 2015	Xtalsoft	March 1984	
55	Phantom Heart	July 9, 2021	Xtalsoft	March 1984	
55	Phantom Heart	April 4, 2023	Xtalsoft	March 1984	
56	Abyss	July 1, 2002	HummingBirdSoft	1984	
56	Abyss	December 17, 2013	HummingBirdSoft	1984	
56	Abyss	September 6, 2016	HummingBirdSoft	1984	
57	Abyss II: Emperor's Tears	July 1, 2002	HummingBirdSoft	July 1985	
57	Abyss II: Emperor's Tears	July 8, 2014	HummingBirdSoft	July 1985	
57	Abyss II: Emperor's Tears	October 6, 2020	HummingBirdSoft	July 1985	
58	Demon's Ring	July 1, 2002	Nihon Falcom	1984	
58	Demon's Ring	December 28, 2006	Nihon Falcom	1984	
59	~~Dragon Slayer: The Legend of Heroes II~~ (delisted)	July 1, 2002	Nihon Falcom		
60	The Man I Love: Disk Mystery #4	July 1, 2002	Thinking Rabbit	1987	
61	Yokai Detective Chima Chima	August 1, 2002	Bothtec	1984	
61	Yokai Detective Chima Chima	February 1, 2009	Bothtec	1984	
61	Yokai Detective Chima Chima	August 4, 2015	Bothtec	1984	
62	Ichiyo: Legend of Darkness	August 1, 2002	HOT-B	1989	
63	Youkiden	August 1, 2002	HOT-B	1987	
64	Jigoku no Renshū Mondai	August 1, 2002	HummingBirdSoft	1984	
64	Jigoku no Renshū Mondai	July 26, 2016	HummingBirdSoft	1984	
64	Jigoku no Renshū Mondai	January 8, 2019	HummingBirdSoft	1984	
65	Destruction Volume 1	August 1, 2002	Soft Studio Wing	1989	
66	Destruction Volume 2	August 1, 2002	Soft Studio Wing	1990	
67	Meurtre d'un Clown	August 1, 2002	Thinking Rabbit	1985	
68	The Stone of Agni	September 1, 2002	HummingBirdSoft	1988	
68	The Stone of Agni	July 9, 2021	HummingBirdSoft	1988	
68	The Stone of Agni	August 24, 2022	HummingBirdSoft	1988	
69	Valis: The Fantasm Soldier	September 1, 2002	Nihon Telenet	1986	
69	Valis: The Fantasm Soldier	February 24, 2015	Nihon Telenet	1986	
70	Cosmic Soldier	October 1, 2002	Kogado Studio	1985	
71	Arcus	October 1, 2002	Nihon Telenet	1988	
72	Chatty	October 1, 2002	System Sacom	1988	
73	Crystal Prison	November 1, 2002	Bothtec	1986	
73	Crystal Prison	February 7, 2017	Bothtec	1986	
74	~~Legend of the Galactic Heroes II~~ (delisted)	November 1, 2002	Bothtec		
75	~~Thexder~~ (delisted on December 12, 2009)	November 1, 2002	Game Arts		
76	Valis: The Fantasm Soldier II	November 1, 2002	Nihon Telenet	1989	
77	~~Crimson~~ (delisted)	November 1, 2002	Xtalsoft		
77	~~Crimson~~ (delisted)	July 9, 2021	Xtalsoft		
78	~~Chōjikū Yōsai Macross: Countdown~~ (delisted)	December 1, 2002	Bothtec		
79	Flappy	December 1, 2002	dB-SOFT	1983	
79	Flappy	January 17, 2017	dB-SOFT	1983	
80	Silpheed: Super Dogfighter	December 1, 2002	Game Arts	1987	
80	Silpheed: Super Dogfighter	April 30, 2013	Game Arts	1987	
81	Eggy	January 10, 2003	Bothtec	1985	
81	Eggy	April 30, 2010	Bothtec	1985	
81	Eggy	April 5, 2016	Bothtec	1985	
82	~~Crimson III~~ (delisted)	January 10, 2003	Xtalsoft		
83	Phantom Heart II	January 10, 2003	Xtalsoft	1985	
83	Phantom Heart II	October 18, 2016	Xtalsoft	1985	
84	Genji	February 10, 2003	HOT-B	1988	
85	Eiyū Densetsu Saga	February 12, 2003	Micro Cabin	1984	
86	King Flappy	March 1, 2003	dB-SOFT	1985	
86	King Flappy	October 16, 2018	dB-SOFT	1985	
87	~~Fire Hawk: Thexder - The Second Contact~~ (delisted on December 12, 2009)	March 1, 2003	Game Arts		
88	Disappeared in Okhotsk: Hokkaido Serial Killer	April 1, 2003	Technical Group Lab	1984	
89	Makai Resurrection	April 4, 2003	Soft Studio Wing	1987	
90	Shiro Densetsu	April 4, 2003	Xtalsoft	1984	
90	Shiro Densetsu	May 24, 2022	Xtalsoft	1984	
91	Zeliard	June 1, 2003	Game Arts	1987	
91	Zeliard	June 30, 2015	Game Arts	1987	
92	~~Princess Tomato in the Salad Kingdom~~ (delisted)	June 5, 2003	Hudson Soft	1984	
93	Carmine	July 22, 2003	Micro Cabin	1987	
94	Veigues: Tactical Gladiator	August 28, 2003	Game Arts	1988	
94	Veigues: Tactical Gladiator	April 23, 2013	Game Arts	1988	
95	The Castle	September 12, 2003	Technical Group Lab	1985	
95	The Castle	February 6, 2016	Technical Group Lab	1985	
96	Castle Excellent	October 8, 2003	Technical Group Lab	1985	
96	Castle Excellent	March 8, 2016	Technical Group Lab	1985	
97	Arks Road	October 8, 2003	Winkysoft	June 1985	
97	Arks Road	March 10, 2020	Winkysoft	June 1985	
97	Arks Road	July 25, 2022	Winkysoft	June 1985	
98	Anti-Life Trooper Androgynous	November 11, 2003	Nihon Telenet	1988	
98	Anti-Life Trooper Androgynous	September 29, 2015	Nihon Telenet	1988	
99	Luxsor: Nights Over Egypt	November 11, 2003	Nihon Telenet	1987	
100	Manhattan Requiem: Angels Flying in the Dark	November 11, 2003	Riverhillsoft	1987	
100	Manhattan Requiem: Angels Flying in the Dark	February 21, 2017	Riverhillsoft	1987	
101	Bokosuka Wars	December 16, 2003	Technical Group Lab	1984	
101	Bokosuka Wars	July 21, 2015	Technical Group Lab	1984	
102	Lizard	December 25, 2003	Xtalsoft	December 1984	
102	Lizard	March 12, 2019	Xtalsoft	December 1984	
102	Lizard	July 9, 2021	Xtalsoft	December 1984	
102	Lizard	December 24, 2021	Xtalsoft	December 1984	
102	Lizard	November 7, 2023	Xtalsoft	December 1984	
103	Super Daisenryaku	January 23, 2004	System Soft	1988	
104	Zan: Yasha Enbukyoku	September 6, 2004	Nihon Telenet	1990	
105	Daisenryaku 88	May 10, 2005	System Soft	1986	
106	Harakiri	September 27, 2005	Game Arts	1984	
107	Psychic City	October 4, 2005	HOT-B	1986	
108	Galuppo Club	October 21, 2005	Micro Cabin	1986	
109	Gamma 5	November 15, 2005	Kure Software Koubou	1986	
110	Hroton Wars	December 13, 2005	Carry Lab	1983	
110	Hroton Wars	July 9, 2021	Carry Lab	1983	
110	Hroton Wars	August 24, 2022	Carry Lab	1983	
111	Space Adventure: Zodiac	December 27, 2005	Riverhillsoft	1985	
112	Tricky	January 10, 2006	Nihon Telenet	1984	
113	Space Diamond	January 17, 2006	Bothtec	1984	
113	Space Diamond	October 30, 2009	Bothtec	1984	
113	Space Diamond	March 6, 2012	Bothtec	1984	
114	Hot Dog	February 14, 2006	Bothtec	1986	
114	Hot Dog	February 1, 2009	Bothtec	1986	
114	Hot Dog	January 10, 2012	Bothtec	1986	
115	Juggler Stone	February 21, 2006	Riverhillsoft	1985	
116	Zodiac 2: Aggres	March 14, 2006	Riverhillsoft	1986	
117	Paladin	March 22, 2006	Bothtec	1985	
117	Paladin	November 15, 2010	Bothtec	1985	
118	Tír-nan-óg: The Forbidden Tower	April 4, 2006	System Soft	1990	
119	SA・ZI・RI	April 11, 2006	Nihon Telenet	1988	
120	Onryō Senki	April 18, 2006	Studio Wing	1988	
121	XZR: Hakai no Gūzō	April 25, 2006	Nihon Telenet	1988	
122	XZR II	May 2, 2006	Nihon Telenet	1988	
123	Yaksa	May 30, 2006	Nihon Telenet	1988	
124	Crest of Gaia	August 1, 2006	Masaya Games	1987	
125	Meo's Mystery Adventure	August 8, 2006	System Soft	1989	
126	Campaign-ban Daisenryaku II	September 12, 2006	System Soft	1989	
127	Lightning Bacchus: The Knight of Iron	September 19, 2006	Masaya Games	1989	
128	~~Chack'n Pop~~ (delisted on May 17, 2008)	September 20, 2006	Taito		
129	~~Gyrodine~~ (delisted on May 17, 2008)	September 20, 2006	Taito		
130	Golden Tomb	September 26, 2006	Magical Zoo	1983	
131	Guyframe	October 3, 2006	Masaya Games	1987	
132	The Great Escape	October 10, 2006	Carry Lab	1985	
132	The Great Escape	July 9, 2021	Carry Lab	1985	
132	The Great Escape	July 25, 2022	Carry Lab	1985	
133	Elthlead	October 17, 2006	Masaya Games	1987	
134	Maidum	November 7, 2006	Masaya Games	1986	
135	~~Elevator Action~~ (delisted on May 17, 2008)	November 10, 2006	Taito		
136	~~Victorious Nine~~ (delisted on May 17, 2008)	November 10, 2006	Taito		
137	The Screamer	December 26, 2006	Magical Zoo	1985	
138	Popful Mail	December 28, 2006	Nihon Falcom	December 20, 1991	
138	Popful Mail	March 17, 2015	Nihon Falcom	December 20, 1991	
139	Star Trader	December 28, 2006	Nihon Falcom	1989	
139	Star Trader	January 13, 2015	Nihon Falcom	1989	
140	Mr. Bump	February 6, 2007	Masaya Games	1986	
141	Jigsaw Adventure	March 27, 2007	System Soft	1984	
142	Dinosaur	December 18, 2007	Nihon Falcom	1990	
143	Burai: Jōkan	March 4, 2008	Riverhillsoft	1989	
144	Wibarm	March 25, 2008	Arsys Software	1986	
145	Star Cruiser	April 29, 2008	Arsys Software	1988	
146	Miracle Warriors: Seal of the Dark Lord	February 10, 2009	Kogado Studio	1986	
147	J.B. Harold Murder Club	April 21, 2009	Riverhillsoft	1986	
148	Kiss of Murder	May 26, 2009	Riverhillsoft	1987	
149	~~Armored Trooper Votoms: Black Unicorn~~ (delisted)	August 11, 2009	Family Soft	1988	
150	D.C. Connection	September 15, 2009	Riverhillsoft	1989	
151	Xak Precious Package: The Tower of Gazzel	January 26, 2010	Micro Cabin	1991	
152	Riglas: Return of the Soul	February 23, 2010	Random House	1986	
153	Addmath	July 30, 2010	Compile	1991	
154	Armored Beast WerDragon	August 31, 2010	Arsys Software	1989	
155	Battle Skin Panic	February 22, 2011	Gainax	1990	
156	Combat Legend Elf	October 25, 2011	Cosmos Computer	1985	
156	Combat Legend Elf	July 9, 2021	Cosmos Computer	1985	
156	Combat Legend Elf	July 4, 2023	Cosmos Computer	1985	
157	Peeping Scandal	August 14, 2012	Bothtec	1984	
158	~~Re-Birth~~ (delisted)	August 28, 2012	SPS	1986	
159	Legend	May 7, 2013	Quasar Soft	1987	
160	~~Ki Taihei~~ (delisted)	May 15, 2013	SPS		
161	Ashe	June 4, 2013	Quasar Soft	1988	
162	A Ressha de Ikō: A-Train	September 24, 2013	Artdink	1985	
163	Helicoid	November 19, 2013	Micronet	1985	
164	Alpha	December 24, 2013	Square	1986	
165	Keyhole Murder	December 24, 2013	Thinking Rabbit	1983	
166	The Death Trap	January 28, 2014	Square	1984	
167	Will: The Death Trap II	February 25, 2014	Square	1985	
168	Genesis: Beyond the Revolution	March 25, 2014	Square	1987	
169	Cruise Chaser Blassty	May 2, 2014	Square	1986	
170	Storm: Neo Strategic Simulation	May 20, 2014	Micronet	1988	
171	Free Way	October 7, 2014	Bothtec	1984	
172	Wanderers from Super Scheme	November 4, 2014	Onion Soft	1989	
173	Dragon 'n' Spirit	April 7, 2015	Bug Taro	1987	
174	Hercules	April 28, 2015	Kogado Studio	1986	
175	~~American Success~~ (delisted)	September 20, 2016	Winkysoft		
176	Duel	November 29, 2016	Kure Software Koubou	1989	
177	Red Stack	February 5, 2019	Cosmos Computer	1985	
178	SeeNa	February 19, 2019	System Soft	May 1986	
179	Tritorn	August 14, 2020	Creative Brain	1985	
180	The Love Story in Kobe	April 27, 2021	Creative Brain	December 1989	
181	The Byouin	January 21, 2022	PSK	1987	
182	Hotel Wars	July 12, 2022	Bothtec	1987	
183	Mahjong Madness Special II: Adventure Edition	August 15, 2023	Micronet	October 1989	
184	The Far Way	January 16, 2024	Brain Media	October 1983	

== PC-9801 ==
The PC-9801 was a Japanese home computer released by NEC in 1982 - and PC-9801 games started to be made available through Project EGG on November 24, 2001.

There have been 307 PC-9801 titles available on Project EGG, 14 of which are no longer available for purchase:

No.	Title	Release date	Original rightsholder	Original release	Ref.
1	Fray in Magical Adventure	November 24, 2001	Micro Cabin	1991	
1	Fray in Magical Adventure	July 28, 2009	Micro Cabin	1991	
2	D.C. Connection	November 24, 2001	Riverhillsoft	1990	
3	J.B. Harold Murder Club	November 24, 2001	Riverhillsoft	1986	
4	Soft de Hard na Monogatari	November 24, 2001	System Sacom	July 1988	
4	Soft de Hard na Monogatari	July 9, 2021	System Sacom	July 1988	
4	Soft de Hard na Monogatari	June 24, 2022	System Sacom	July 1988	
4	Soft de Hard na Monogatari	February 7, 2023	System Sacom	July 1988	
5	Soft de Hard na Monogatari II	November 24, 2001	System Sacom	June 1989	
5	Soft de Hard na Monogatari II	July 25, 2022	System Sacom	June 1989	
5	Soft de Hard na Monogatari II	March 14, 2023	System Sacom	June 1989	
6	Psy-O-Blade	November 24, 2001	T&E Soft	1989	
6	Psy-O-Blade	April 19, 2016	T&E Soft	1989	
6	Psy-O-Blade	July 25, 2022	T&E Soft	1989	
7	Rune Worth 2: Jikuu no Shinsen	November 24, 2001	T&E Soft	1991	
7	Rune Worth 2: Jikuu no Shinsen	February 24, 2006	T&E Soft	1991	
7	Rune Worth 2: Jikuu no Shinsen	July 30, 2019	T&E Soft	1991	
8	Revival Xanadu: Easy Ver.	January 24, 2002	Nihon Falcom	1995	
8	Revival Xanadu: Easy Ver.	May 29, 2007	Nihon Falcom	1995	
8	Revival Xanadu: Easy Ver.	March 13, 2018	Nihon Falcom	1995	
9	Xak III: The Eternal Recurrence	February 25, 2002	Micro Cabin	1993	
9	Xak III: The Eternal Recurrence	January 31, 2012	Micro Cabin	1993	
9	Xak III: The Eternal Recurrence	May 14, 2019	Micro Cabin	1993	
10	Revival Xanadu II Remix	February 25, 2002	Nihon Falcom	1995	
10	Revival Xanadu II Remix	August 14, 2007	Nihon Falcom	1995	
10	Revival Xanadu II Remix	April 24, 2018	Nihon Falcom	1995	
11	Tōdō Ryūnosuke Tantei Nikki: Ōgon no Rashinban	February 25, 2002	Riverhillsoft	1990	
12	Märchen Veil II	February 25, 2002	System Sacom	June 1986	
12	Märchen Veil II	June 23, 2006	System Sacom	June 1986	
12	Märchen Veil II	November 24, 2021	System Sacom	June 1986	
12	Märchen Veil II	February 14, 2023	System Sacom	June 1986	
13	Paracelsus no Maken	March 24, 2002	HummingBirdSoft	December 2, 1994	
14	Phantom City	March 24, 2002	Micro Cabin	January 18, 1992	
14	Phantom City	October 27, 2009	Micro Cabin	January 18, 1992	
14	Phantom City	December 12, 2017	Micro Cabin	January 18, 1992	
15	Dinosaur	March 24, 2002	Nihon Falcom	1991	
15	Dinosaur	May 8, 2007	Nihon Falcom	1991	
16	Rune Worth 3: Shinsei Kikourin	March 24, 2002	T&E Soft	1991	
16	Rune Worth 3: Shinsei Kikourin	February 24, 2006	T&E Soft	1991	
16	Rune Worth 3: Shinsei Kikourin	August 29, 2019	T&E Soft	1991	
17	Xak Precious Package: The Tower of Gazzel	April 24, 2002	Micro Cabin	1991	
18	~~Brandish~~ (delisted)	April 24, 2002	Nihon Falcom		
19	Manhattan Requiem: Angels Flying in the Dark	April 24, 2002	Riverhillsoft	1987	
19	Manhattan Requiem: Angels Flying in the Dark	March 16, 2010	Riverhillsoft	1987	
20	Onryō Senki	April 24, 2002	Studio Wing	1989	
21	Hydlide 3 S.V.	April 24, 2002	T&E Soft	September 9, 1989	
21	Hydlide 3 S.V.	January 17, 2023	T&E Soft	September 9, 1989	
22	Brandish 2 - The Planet Buster	May 24, 2002	Nihon Falcom	1993	
22	Brandish 2 - The Planet Buster	March 6, 2007	Nihon Falcom	1993	
22	Brandish 2 - The Planet Buster	October 31, 2017	Nihon Falcom	1993	
23	Lord Monarch	September 1, 2002	Nihon Falcom	1991	
23	Lord Monarch	April 10, 2007	Nihon Falcom	1991	
23	Lord Monarch	August 29, 2017	Nihon Falcom	1991	
24	Amber Testament	September 1, 2002	Riverhillsoft	1988	
25	Burai: Jōkan	October 1, 2002	Riverhillsoft	1989	
26	Burai: Gekan - Kanketsu-hen	November 1, 2002	Riverhillsoft	1990	
27	Advanced Lord Monarch	December 1, 2002	Nihon Falcom	November 29, 1991	
27	Advanced Lord Monarch	July 24, 2007	Nihon Falcom	November 29, 1991	
28	Popful Mail	December 1, 2002	Nihon Falcom	June 27, 1992	
28	Popful Mail	June 26, 2007	Nihon Falcom	June 27, 1992	
28	Popful Mail	June 27, 2017	Nihon Falcom	June 27, 1992	
29	Elysion	January 21, 2003	System Soft	1986	
30	Muteki Keiji: Daidageki - Shijō Saidai no Hanzai	July 30, 2003	Family Soft	1990	
31	Elm Knight: A Living Body Armor	October 29, 2003	Micro Cabin	1992	
31	Elm Knight: A Living Body Armor	March 26, 2019	Micro Cabin	1992	
32	Death Bringer	December 25, 2003	Nihon Telenet	1989	
33	Regional Power	January 14, 2004	Cosmos Computer	October 5, 1990	
33	Regional Power	July 9, 2021	Cosmos Computer	October 5, 1990	
33	Regional Power	January 24, 2022	Cosmos Computer	October 5, 1990	
33	Regional Power	March 7, 2023	Cosmos Computer	October 5, 1990	
34	Lesser Mern	January 14, 2004	Panther Software	1992	
35	Eikan wa Kimi ni: Kōkō Yakyū Zenkoku Taikai	February 21, 2004	Artdink	1990	
35	Eikan wa Kimi ni: Kōkō Yakyū Zenkoku Taikai	August 14, 2018	Artdink	1990	
36	Eiyū Shigan: Gal Act Heroism	February 27, 2004	Micro Cabin	1994	
37	Mid-Garts	March 12, 2004	Nihon Telenet	1989	
38	Zan: Yasha Enbukyoku	March 12, 2004	Nihon Telenet	1989	
39	Duel	March 26, 2004	Kure Software Koubou	1990	
40	Zan II: Kagerou no Toki	April 16, 2004	Nihon Telenet	1991	
41	Sabnack	August 24, 2004	Kogado Studio	1991	
41	Sabnack	August 30, 2016	Kogado Studio	1991	
42	Deflektor	September 6, 2004	Bullet-Proof Software	1991	
43	Hydlide	October 1, 2004	T&E Soft	1984	
43	Hydlide	March 24, 2022	T&E Soft	1984	
44	Sword World PC	October 1, 2004	T&E Soft	December 1992	
44	Sword World PC	July 18, 2023	T&E Soft	December 1992	
45	Eikan wa Kimi ni 2	November 11, 2004	Artdink	1991	
45	Eikan wa Kimi ni 2	August 13, 2019	Artdink	1991	
46	Dark Seraphim	December 24, 2004	Kure Software Koubou	1995	
47	Kigen	December 24, 2004	Riverhillsoft	1991	
48	Arcus III	February 18, 2005	Nihon Telenet	October 18, 1991	
49	Cybernetic Hi-School: Dennougakuen	March 4, 2005	Gainax	1989	
50	Cybernetic Hi-School Part 2: Highway Buster	March 4, 2005	Gainax	1989	
51	Cybernetic Hi-School Part 3: Gunbuster	April 22, 2005	Gainax		
52	Cybernetic Hi-School Part 4: Ape Hunter J	May 27, 2005	Gainax		
53	Tenbu Sangokushi Seishi	August 23, 2005	Nihon Telenet	1991	
53	Tenbu Sangokushi Seishi	May 12, 2006 (Note: Special version with added scenarios.)	Nihon Telenet	1991	
54	Sekigahara	September 13, 2005	Artdink	1991	
54	Sekigahara	January 29, 2019	Artdink	1991	
55	D: Ōshū Shinkirō	September 20, 2005	Nihon Telenet	1990	
56	~~Record of Lodoss War~~ (delisted)	October 27, 2005			
57	Gensei Kitan: Disc Saga III	November 11, 2005	Compile	1994	
58	~~Record of Lodoss War: Fukujinzuke~~ (delisted)	November 25, 2005			
59	Eiyū Densetsu Saga	November 29, 2005	Micro Cabin	1984	
60	~~Record of Lodoss War II~~ (delisted)	December 9, 2005			
61	Youtoden	December 20, 2005	System Soft	1989	
62	Daiva Story 7: Light of Kari Yuga	December 23, 2005	T&E Soft	December 1987	
62	Daiva Story 7: Light of Kari Yuga	March 8, 2022	T&E Soft	December 1987	
63	Tenka Tōitsu	January 13, 2006	System Soft	July 28, 1989	
63	Tenka Tōitsu	June 18, 2019	System Soft	July 28, 1989	
64	~~Record of Lodoss War: Fukujinzuke 2~~ (delisted)	January 27, 2006			
65	Topple Zip	January 31, 2006	Bothtec	1987	
65	Topple Zip	February 1, 2009	Bothtec	1987	
65	Topple Zip	January 3, 2017	Bothtec	1987	
66	Tenka Tōitsu II: Ransei no Hasha	February 10, 2006	System Soft	1991	
67	Rune Worth: Black Prince	February 24, 2006	T&E Soft	April 20, 1990	
67	Rune Worth: Black Prince	September 20, 2022	T&E Soft	April 20, 1990	
68	CrEastar: Planets in Legend	March 7, 2006	Bothtec	1989	
68	CrEastar: Planets in Legend	July 9, 2021	Bothtec	1989	
68	CrEastar: Planets in Legend	February 25, 2022	Bothtec	1989	
69	Tokyo Twilight Busters: Kindan no Ikenie Teito Jigokuhen	March 10, 2006	Nihon Telenet	1995	
70	Phantasie RPG: Amaranth	March 24, 2006	Fuga System		
71	Phantasie RPG: Amaranth II	March 24, 2006	Fuga System		
72	Master of Monsters II + Scenario Collection	April 28, 2006	System Soft	1991	
72	Master of Monsters II + Scenario Collection	April 16, 2019	System Soft	1991	
73	Robo Crush 98	May 26, 2006	System Soft	1991	
74	~~Record of Lodoss War: Fukujinzuke 3~~ (delisted)	June 9, 2006			
75	Märchen Veil	June 23, 2006	System Sacom		
76	Master of Monsters Final: Rings of Twilight	July 13, 2006	System Soft	1992	
76	Master of Monsters Final: Rings of Twilight	August 25, 2020	System Soft	1992	
77	Arcshu: Kagerou no Jidai o Koete	July 25, 2006	Nihon Telenet	1990	
78	Yougekitai: Jashin Koumaroku	July 28, 2006	Nihon Telenet	1993	
79	Robo Crush 2	August 11, 2006	System Soft	1993	
80	Power Dolls	August 25, 2006	Kogado Studio	1994	
80	Power Dolls	May 1, 2018	Kogado Studio	1994	
81	Tenbu Limited	September 8, 2006	Nihon Telenet	1992	
82	Ex-Lander	October 13, 2006	Micro Vision	1993	
83	Sengoku Akihabara Nobunaga Den	October 31, 2006	MediaWorks	1993	
84	Lunatic Dawn II	November 24, 2006	Kogado Studio	1994	
85	Melty Lancer: The Melting Pot Police	December 8, 2006	Tenky	1995	
86	Tenbu Limited: Mankan Zenseki	December 12, 2006	Nihon Telenet	1992	
87	Dragon Slayer: The Legend of Heroes	December 28, 2006	Nihon Falcom	1990	
87	Dragon Slayer: The Legend of Heroes	December 27, 2016	Nihon Falcom	1990	
88	Dragon Slayer: The Legend of Heroes II	December 28, 2006	Nihon Falcom	1992	
88	Dragon Slayer: The Legend of Heroes II	July 31, 2018	Nihon Falcom	1992	
89	~~Sotsugyou: Graduation~~ (delisted on December 31, 2010)	January 12, 2007			
90	~~Sotsugyou II: Neo Generation~~ (delisted on December 31, 2010)	January 12, 2007			
91	Tír-nan-óg	January 23, 2007	System Soft	1987	
92	Desert Dragoon	January 26, 2007	Tenky	1993	
93	Brandish 3: Spirit of Balcan	February 27, 2007	Nihon Falcom	1994	
93	Brandish 3: Spirit of Balcan	October 30, 2018	Nihon Falcom	1994	
94	Brandish Renewal	March 6, 2007	Nihon Falcom	1995	
94	Brandish Renewal	October 25, 2016	Nihon Falcom	1995	
95	The Legend of Heroes III: White Witch Renewal	March 13, 2007	Nihon Falcom	1994	
95	The Legend of Heroes III: White Witch Renewal	September 25, 2018	Nihon Falcom	1994	
96	Daikairei: Dai Nippon Teikoku Kaigun no Kiseki	March 20, 2007	Artdink	1988	
97	Double Eagle	April 1, 2007	Artdink	1989	
98	Tenka Gomen	April 1, 2007	Artdink	1994	
99	Kikō Shidan: Panzer Division	April 3, 2007	Artdink	1993	
100	Daisenryaku III '90	April 10, 2007	System Soft	1990	
100	Daisenryaku III '90	October 27, 2020	System Soft	1990	
101	Zavaş II: The Prophecy of Mehitae	April 17, 2007	Popcom Soft	1993	
102	Eikan wa Kimi ni 3: Koukou Yakyuu Zenkoku Taikai	April 24, 2007	Artdink	1993	
103	Kikō Shidan II: Panzer Division	May 8, 2007	Artdink	1992	
104	The Atlas	May 15, 2007	Artdink	1991	
105	The Legend of Heroes IV: Vermillion Drop	May 22, 2007	Nihon Falcom	1996	
105	The Legend of Heroes IV: Vermillion Drop	December 25, 2018	Nihon Falcom	1996	
106	38000 Kilo no Kokū	May 29, 2007	System Sacom	1989	
106	38000 Kilo no Kokū	December 24, 2021	System Sacom	1989	
107	The Atlas II	June 5, 2007	Artdink	1993	
108	Hiōden II	June 12, 2007	Nihon Telenet	1993	
109	Zan III: Tenun Ware ni Ari	July 3, 2007	Nihon Telenet	1993	
110	Phantasie RPG: Amaranth III	July 24, 2007	Fuga System	January 14, 1994	
111	Amaranth IV: Abenteuerroman in Langsam	August 7, 2007	Fuga System	1995	
112	Suzaku	August 14, 2007	Nihon Telenet	1992	
113	Air Combat II	September 4, 2007	System Soft	1991	
114	Dead Force	September 11, 2007	Fuga System	1994	
115	Lord of Panzers	September 18, 2007	System Soft	1994	
116	Oerstedia	September 25, 2007	Fuga System	1993	
117	Air Combat III	October 2, 2007	System Soft	1992	
118	Daikairei: Nankai no Shitou	October 9, 2007	Artdink	1989	
119	Fantasy Knight	October 23, 2007	System Soft	1987	
120	First Queen II: Sabaku no Joō	October 30, 2007	Kure Software Koubou	1990	
121	Taiheiyou no Arashi DX	November 6, 2007	System Soft	1988	
122	Sorcerian	December 25, 2007	Nihon Falcom	1987	
123	Sorcerian Utility Vol. 1 (Note: Requires Sorcerian in order to play.)	December 25, 2007	Nihon Falcom	1987	
124	Relics	January 15, 2008	Bothtec	1986	
124	Relics	December 11, 2009	Bothtec	1986	
124	Relics	July 9, 2021	Bothtec	1986	
124	Relics	April 26, 2022	Bothtec	1986	
125	Star Trader	January 22, 2008	Nihon Falcom	1989	
125	Star Trader	July 25, 2017	Nihon Falcom	1989	
126	Sorcerian Additional Scenario Vol. 1 (Note: Requires Sorcerian and Sorcerian Utility Vol. 1 in order to play.)	January 29, 2008	Nihon Falcom	1988	
127	Ys I: Ancient Ys Vanished	February 12, 2008	Nihon Falcom	1987	
127	Ys I: Ancient Ys Vanished	November 28, 2017	Nihon Falcom	1987	
128	Xak: The Art of Visual Stage	February 19, 2008	Micro Cabin	1989	
129	Sorcerian Additional Scenario Vol. 2 – Sengoku Sorcerian	February 26, 2008	Nihon Falcom	1988	
130	Sorcerian Additional Scenario Vol. 3 – Pyramid Sorcerian	March 18, 2008	Nihon Falcom	1988	
131	Ys II: Ancient Ys Vanished – The Final Chapter	April 8, 2008	Nihon Falcom	1988	
131	Ys II: Ancient Ys Vanished – The Final Chapter	December 26, 2017	Nihon Falcom	1988	
132	Sorcerian New Scenario Vol. 1 – The Visitor from Outer Space	April 15, 2008	Nihon Falcom	1989	
133	Wizardry: Crusaders of the Dark Savant	April 22, 2008	Drecom	1994	
134	Ge-Ten: Sengoku Nobunaga	May 13, 2008	Hokusho	1991	
135	Disc Saga: Immoral Dragon	May 20, 2008	Compile	1991	
135	Disc Saga: Immoral Dragon	March 1, 2016	Compile	1991	
136	Sorcerian Additional Scenario: Gilgamesh Sorcerian	May 27, 2008	Nihon Falcom	1990	
137	Ys III: Wanderers from Ys	June 3, 2008	Nihon Falcom	1989	
137	Ys III: Wanderers from Ys	January 30, 2018	Nihon Falcom	1989	
138	~~Garyuden~~ (delisted)	June 10, 2008	Hokusho	1994	
139	Sorcerian Additional Scenario: Selected Sorcerian 1	June 17, 2008	Nihon Falcom	1989	
140	Disc Saga: Sleeping Treasure	June 24, 2008	Compile	1991	
140	Disc Saga: Sleeping Treasure	July 2, 2013	Compile	1991	
141	Apple Sauce: Room	July 1, 2008	Compile	1990	
142	Ge-Ten II	July 8, 2008	Hokusho	1993	
143	Sorcerian Additional Scenario: Selected Sorcerian 2	July 15, 2008	Nihon Falcom	1990	
144	First Queen III	July 22, 2008	Kure Software Koubou	1993	
145	Disc Saga Episode III: Burning Sword!	July 29, 2008	Compile	1991	
145	Disc Saga Episode III: Burning Sword!	September 2, 2014	Compile	1991	
146	Sorcerian Additional Scenario: Selected Sorcerian 3	August 5, 2008	Nihon Falcom	1990	
147	Akai Sumo: Ai no Dosukoi Densetsu	August 12, 2008	Compile	1991	
147	Akai Sumo: Ai no Dosukoi Densetsu	October 5, 2010	Compile	1991	
147	Akai Sumo: Ai no Dosukoi Densetsu	September 4, 2018	Compile	1991	
148	First Queen IV	August 26, 2008	Kure Software Koubou	1994	
149	Saru Yama Tengoku	September 2, 2008	Compile	1991	
149	Saru Yama Tengoku	February 1, 2009	Compile	1991	
150	Zone - Physical Action Game	September 9, 2008	System Sacom	1985	
150	Zone - Physical Action Game	July 25, 2022	System Sacom	1985	
151	Sorcerian Additional Scenario: Selected Sorcerian 4	September 16, 2008	Nihon Falcom	1990	
152	Yoshida Gakuen Senki Part 1	September 23, 2008	Compile	1992	
152	Yoshida Gakuen Senki Part 1	November 3, 2009	Compile	1992	
153	Marvel Putt Golf	October 7, 2008	Compile	1991	
153	Marvel Putt Golf	February 1, 2009	Compile	1991	
153	Marvel Putt Golf	October 1, 2019	Compile	1991	
154	Power Singer: Ellance Saga #1	October 14, 2008	System Sacom	1992	
154	Power Singer: Ellance Saga #1	June 24, 2022	System Sacom	1992	
155	Sorcerian Additional Scenario: Selected Sorcerian 5	October 21, 2008	Nihon Falcom	1990	
156	Disc Saga Episode IV: The Tower of Muda	October 28, 2008	Compile	1991	
156	Disc Saga Episode IV: The Tower of Muda	October 6, 2015	Compile	1991	
157	Shiki Oni no Koku: Chūgokuhen - Daiisshō	November 4, 2008	Compile	1992	
157	Shiki Oni no Koku: Chūgokuhen - Daiisshō	March 2, 2010	Compile	1992	
158	Highway Star	November 11, 2008	System Sacom	1986	
158	Highway Star	July 9, 2021	System Sacom	1986	
158	Highway Star	December 24, 2021	System Sacom	1986	
159	Yoshida Gakuen Senki Part 2	November 18, 2008	Compile	1992	
159	Yoshida Gakuen Senki Part 2	August 5, 2014	Compile	1992	
160	~~Makyoden~~ (delisted)	November 25, 2008	Nihon Create	1992	
161	Akai Sumo: Ai no Dosukoi Densetsu - Episode 2 "Arashi no Doscoinger Z"	December 2, 2008	Compile	1991	
161	Akai Sumo: Ai no Dosukoi Densetsu - Episode 2 "Arashi no Doscoinger Z"	February 7, 2012	Compile	1991	
162	Shiki Oni no Koku: Chūgokuhen - Dainishō	December 16, 2008	Compile	1992	
162	Shiki Oni no Koku: Chūgokuhen - Dainishō	August 14, 2012	Compile	1992	
163	First Queen	December 23, 2008	Kure Software Koubou	1988	
164	Akai Sumo: Ai no Dosukoi Densetsu - Episode 3 "Disappeared Fang"	January 13, 2009	Compile	1991	
164	Akai Sumo: Ai no Dosukoi Densetsu - Episode 3 "Disappeared Fang"	January 7, 2014	Compile	1991	
165	~~Diadrum~~ (delisted)	January 21, 2008	Nihon Create	1993	
166	Shiki Oni no Koku: Chūgokuhen - Daisanshō	January 27, 2009	Compile	1992	
166	Shiki Oni no Koku: Chūgokuhen - Daisanshō	April 1, 2014	Compile		
167	Shiki Oni no Koku: Chūgokuhen - Daiyonshō	February 17, 2009	Compile	1992	
167	Shiki Oni no Koku: Chūgokuhen - Daiyonshō	April 3, 2018	Compile	1992	
168	Apple Sauce: Hinamatsuri	March 3, 2009	Compile	1992	
169	Mahjong Vanilla Syndrome	March 10, 2009	Nichibutsu	1993	
170	Disc Saga: The Client is a Monster?	March 17, 2009	Compile	1992	
170	Disc Saga: The Client is a Monster?	June 1, 2010	Compile	1992	
170	Disc Saga: The Client is a Monster?	November 6, 2018	Compile	1992	
171	Marvel Putt Golf II	March 24, 2009	Compile	1992	
171	Marvel Putt Golf II	August 31, 2010	Compile	1992	
171	Marvel Putt Golf II	April 2, 2013	Compile	1992	
172	Rusty #1	March 31, 2009	Compile	1992	
172	Rusty #1	May 6, 2010	Compile	1992	
172	Rusty #1	October 2, 2018	Compile	1992	
173	Sword of Destruction	April 14, 2009	Compile	1990	
173	Sword of Destruction	August 2, 2011	Compile	1990	
174	Tango-no-Sekku a Koinobori	May 5, 2009	Compile	1991	
175	DIsc Saga: Nagisa no Baka Taishō	May 12, 2009	Compile	1992	
175	DIsc Saga: Nagisa no Baka Taishō	November 5, 2013	Compile	1992	
176	Rusty #2	May 19, 2009	Compile	1992	
176	Rusty #2	February 4, 2014	Compile	1992	
177	Rain	June 2, 2009	Compile	1991	
178	Addmath	June 9, 2009	Compile	1991	
178	Addmath	July 6, 2010	Compile	1991	
179	~~Armored Trooper Votoms: Real Battle~~ (delisted)	June 16, 2009	Family Soft	1996	
180	Sword of Destruction II: Mansion of the Heinous	June 23, 2009	Compile	1991	
180	Sword of Destruction II: Mansion of the Heinous	September 4, 2012	Compile	1991	
181	Mahjong Ō Densetsu	June 30, 2009	Nichibutsu	1992	
182	Astro Scope	July 7, 2009	Compile	1991	
183	Disc Saga: Beautiful Women who Disappeared into the Steam - Rendezvous into a Dream	July 21, 2009	Compile	1992	
183	Disc Saga: Beautiful Women who Disappeared into the Steam - Rendezvous into a Dream	December 1, 2015	Compile	1992	
184	Rusty #3	August 25, 2009	Compile	1992	
184	Rusty #3	June 3, 2014	Compile	1992	
185	Rōrī Takashima no Petapeta Sawatte	September 8, 2009	Compile	1992	
186	~~Kerosuke no Kanchū Kunren~~ (delisted)	September 29, 2009	Compile		
187	Rusty #4	October 20, 2009	Compile	1992	
187	Rusty #4	March 6, 2018	Compile	1992	
188	Valis: The Fantasm Soldier II	November 10, 2009	Nihon Telenet	1989	
189	Sword of the Goddess - Chapter of Peruna	November 17, 2009	Compile	1992	
189	Sword of the Goddess - Chapter of Peruna	November 2, 2010	Compile	1992	
190	Xak II: Rising of the Redmoon	November 25, 2009	Micro Cabin	1990	
190	Xak II: Rising of the Redmoon	February 20, 2018	Micro Cabin	1990	
191	Apple Sauce 7: Murekuro Zuruppa	December 1, 2009	Compile	1993	
192	The Tower of Cabin	December 15, 2009	Micro Cabin	1992	
193	Apple Sauce: Pirates	January 5, 2010	Compile	1991	
194	Transborder	January 19, 2010	Compile	1993	
194	Transborder	July 5, 2011	Compile	1993	
195	Push'n Pop	February 18, 2010	Compile	1993	
195	Push'n Pop	April 5, 2011	Compile	1993	
196	Jump Hero	March 9, 2010	Compile	1994	
196	Jump Hero	June 7, 2011	Compile	1994	
197	Apple Sauce: Unexplored Region Expedition	April 6, 2010	Compile	1996	
198	Hamlet	July 13, 2010	Panther Software	1993	
199	Solid Lancer	September 28, 2010	System Soft	1993	
200	Super Battle Skin Panic	October 19, 2010	Gainax	1991	
201	Esper Mujuku	November 16, 2010	Compile	1993	
201	Esper Mujuku	April 3, 2012	Compile	1993	
202	Juushin Rogus	December 28, 2010	Random House	1988	
203	Broadway Densetsu Elena	March 18, 2011	Compile	1994	
203	Broadway Densetsu Elena	June 5, 2012	Compile	1994	
204	Headquarters: America no Akumu	May 10, 2011	Algolab	1994	
205	Kerosuke no Fuyujitaku	May 10, 2011	Compile	1992	
206	Bomber-san Taro's Bomb Heaven	June 14, 2011	Compile	1993	
206	Bomber-san Taro's Bomb Heaven	July 3, 2012	Compile	1993	
207	Kote de Mekūru	September 20, 2011	Compile	1995	
207	Kote de Mekūru	October 9, 2012	Compile	1995	
208	Devil Force Part 1	October 18, 2011	Compile	1993	
208	Devil Force Part 1	November 13, 2012	Compile	1993	
209	Maboroshi yo Fūkyōden	November 15, 2011	Compile	1994	
209	Maboroshi yo Fūkyōden	February 12, 2013	Compile	1994	
210	Sōkō Kakutōden: Fighting Numbers	December 27, 2011	Compile	1995	
210	Sōkō Kakutōden: Fighting Numbers	January 15, 2013	Compile	1995	
211	Wings of Algis	December 27, 2011	Kogado Studio	1988	
212	Wind's Seed	January 24, 2012	Compile	1995	
212	Wind's Seed	March 12, 2013	Compile	1995	
212	Wind's Seed	April 30, 2013	Compile	1995	
213	Geo Conflict	February 21, 2012	Compile	1994	
213	Geo Conflict	May 3, 2016	Compile	1994	
214	Maboroshi Yōkai Tōde	March 13, 2012	Compile	1995	
214	Maboroshi Yōkai Tōde	May 8, 2018	Compile	1995	
215	Knuckle Kid	April 10, 2012	Compile	1995	
215	Knuckle Kid	March 29, 2013	Compile	1995	
215	Knuckle Kid	August 6, 2013	Compile	1995	
216	Kyuukyoku Hengen Battle Gal Saori	May 8, 2012	Compile	1995	
216	Kyuukyoku Hengen Battle Gal Saori	September 3, 2013	Compile	1995	
217	Imperial Force	May 29, 2012	System Soft	1990	
218	Woom	June 12, 2012	System Sacom	1984	
218	Woom	April 6, 2021	System Sacom	1984	
219	Casablanca: Ni Ai wo Satsujinsha ha Jikuu wo Koete	July 17, 2012	Thinking Rabbit	1986	
220	Usazaku Gaiden: I'm the Trump Card	July 24, 2012	Compile	1996	
220	Usazaku Gaiden: I'm the Trump Card	October 1, 2013	Compile	1996	
221	Devil Force Part 2	September 11, 2012	Compile	1994	
221	Devil Force Part 2	July 3, 2018	Compile	1994	
222	Tuned Heart	September 25, 2012	System Soft	1996	
223	Art Jigsaw Vol. 2: Pretty Girl	October 2, 2012	System Soft	1992	
224	Let's Play with Muscles	October 23, 2012	Compile	1994	
224	Let's Play with Muscles	January 30, 2013	Compile	1994	
224	Let's Play with Muscles	September 24, 2022	Compile	1994	
225	Ten Kyū Pai	November 13, 2012	Panther Software	1989	
226	Shakunetsu no Fire Live	December 3, 2012	Compile	1996	
226	Shakunetsu no Fire Live	December 3, 2013	Compile	1996	
227	Apple Sauce: Forest Christmas	December 4, 2012	Compile	1996	
228	Tír-nan-óg II: The Sign of Chaos	December 25, 2012	System Soft	1989	
229	King of Full Stomach	January 29, 2013	Compile	1996	
229	King of Full Stomach	June 30, 2013	Compile	1996	
229	King of Full Stomach	March 4, 2014	Compile	1996	
230	Galaxy	January 29, 2013	System Soft	1989	
231	Rude Breaker	March 26, 2013	Compile	1996	
231	Rude Breaker	May 31, 2013	Compile	1996	
231	Rude Breaker	May 6, 2014	Compile	1996	
232	Michiyo Dreamy: the Quiz Master	April 16, 2013	System Sacom	1993	
232	Michiyo Dreamy: the Quiz Master	February 25, 2022	System Sacom	1993	
233	Zero Senki	April 30, 2013	System Soft	1993	
234	Devil Force II: The Stolen Treasure	June 18, 2013	Compile	1996	
234	Devil Force II: The Stolen Treasure	March 5, 2019	Compile	1996	
235	Blitzkrieg	July 9, 2013	System Soft	1990	
236	Dires -giger・loop-	July 16, 2013	Bothtec	1987	
236	Dires -giger・loop-	August 2, 2016	Bothtec	1987	
237	Japan Bashing	August 27, 2013	System Soft	1992	
238	Art Jigsaw Vol. 1: Super Weapon	September 10, 2013	System Soft	1992	
239	Carmine	September 17, 2013	Micro Cabin	1986	
240	Magic Increment	October 8, 2013	Cosmos Computer	1993	
240	Magic Increment	May 4, 2021	Cosmos Computer	1993	
241	Seilane	October 22, 2013	Micro Cabin	1987	
242	Art Jigsaw Vol. 3: Fantastic	December 10, 2013	System Soft	1992	
243	Tanukids	January 21, 2014	Compile	1996	
243	Tanukids	May 5, 2015	Compile	1996	
244	Mahjong Madness Special II: Adventure Edition	January 21, 2014	Micronet	1990	
245	Melpool Land	February 12, 2014	Compile	1995	
245	Melpool Land	February 2, 2016	Compile	1995	
246	Melpool Land Stories	March 18, 2014	Compile	1996	
246	Melpool Land Stories	August 1, 2017	Compile	1996	
247	Bible Master: Crash of the Blleot Rutz	April 15, 2014	Glodia	1993	
248	Navitune: The Dragon Voyage	April 15, 2014	Kogado Studio	1990	
249	Versus: Road to Fighting King	April 30, 2014	Compile	1995	
249	Versus: Road to Fighting King	July 7, 2015	Compile	1995	
250	A Ressha de Ikō: A-Train III	May 13, 2014	Artdink	1990	
251	Alpha	May 27, 2014	Square	1986	
252	The Death Trap	June 24, 2014	Square	1984	
253	GaGaGa Sprint	July 8, 2014	Compile	1996	
253	GaGaGa Sprint	November 3, 2015	Compile	1996	
254	Will: The Death Trap II	July 29, 2014	Square	1985	
255	A Ressha de Ikō: A-Train IV	August 19, 2014	Artdink	December 6, 1993	
256	Genesis: Beyond the Revolution	August 26, 2014	Square	1987	
257	Runners High	September 2, 2014	Compile	1996	
257	Runners High	January 5, 2016	Compile	1996	
258	Bible Master 2: The Chaos of Aglia	October 14, 2014	Glodia	1994	
259	Junjō Ninja Hana Chi no Bakudan Maru Vol. 1	January 6, 2015	Compile	1992	
260	Etemibur: Endless Heaven	January 6, 2015	Glodia	1995	
261	Junjō Ninja Hana Chi no Bakudan Maru Vol. 2	February 3, 2015	Compile	1992	
262	Final Breaker	February 24, 2015	System Soft	1993	
263	Junjō Ninja Hana Chi no Bakudan Maru Vol. 3	March 3, 2015	Compile	1992	
264	Mashō Denki La Valeur	November 24, 2015	Kogado Studio	1989	
265	Super Daisenryaku 98	December 29, 2015	System Soft	1988	
266	Meurtre d'un Clown	January 19, 2016	Thinking Rabbit	1985	
267	~~Re-Birth~~ (delisted)	May 31, 2016	SPS	1986	
268	Power Dolls 2	June 28, 2016	Kogado Studio	1994	
269	Laplace's Demon	July 26, 2016	HummingBirdSoft	1987	
270	The Grail Hunter	March 21, 2017	Nihon Telenet	1994	
271	Crystal Chaser (Note: There was a special promotion for the re-release of this title, where the first 256 customers also received a digital copy of the demo disc.)	June 15, 2017	Nihon Telenet	1991	
272	Schwarzschild: Kyouran no Ginga	September 19, 2017	Kogado Studio	December 9, 1988	
273	Shinsengumi: Bakumatsu Genshikou (Note: There was a special promotion for the re-release of this title, where the first 256 customers received a PDF scan of the original title's picture book.)	November 9, 2017	Nihon Telenet	1991	
274	Tokio	April 6, 2018	Artdink	1992	
275	How Many Robot	June 12, 2018	Artdink	1987	
276	Arctic	July 10, 2018	Artdink	1988	
277	Hiōden: Mamono-tachi tono Chikai	November 13, 2018	Nihon Telenet	1992	
278	Regional Power III	February 12, 2019	Cosmos Computer	1993	
278	Regional Power III	April 26, 2022	Cosmos Computer	1993	
279	Regional Power II	October 22, 2019	Cosmos Computer	1992	
279	Regional Power II	November 24, 2021	Cosmos Computer	1992	
280	Apple Sauce: Western	November 5, 2019	Compile	1991	
281	Big Honour	April 28, 2020	Artdink	1992	
282	Silent Möbius	November 2, 2020	Gainax	1990	
283	Gensei Torimonochou	October 11, 2022	Compile	1996	
284	Sword Dancer	November 24, 2022	Technical Group Lab	March 1992	
285	Sword Dancer: Special Issue	November 24, 2022	Technical Group Lab	November 1992	
286	Sword Dancer: Special Issue '93	November 24, 2022	Technical Group Lab	April 1993	
287	Edge	April 25, 2023	Technical Group Lab	January 15, 1991	
288	Farland Story	April 25, 2023	Technical Group Lab	October 15, 1993	
289	Farland Story Denko: Arc Ō no Ensei	May 23, 2023	Technical Group Lab	1994	
290	Farland Story: Angel's Tears	June 27, 2023	Technical Group Lab	July 1994	
291	Farland Story: Silver Wings	August 29, 2023	Technical Group Lab	November 3, 1994	
292	Record of Lodoss War: The Grey Witch	September 19, 2023	HummingBirdSoft	September 1988	
293	Kisō Shinden: Gen-Kaiser	September 26, 2023	Technical Group Lab	May 1995	
294	Puyo Puyo	October 17, 2023	Compile	February 19, 1993	
295	Madō Sugoroku	October 24, 2023	Compile	January 9, 1996	
296	Farland Story: Daichi no Kizuna	October 31, 2023	Technical Group Lab	March 1995	
297	Crystal Chaser: Magical Crystal Ball in the Sky - R	November 7, 2023	Wolf CC-R Team	November 7, 2023	
298	Madō Monogatari A・R・S	November 21, 2023	Compile	December 10, 1993	
299	Nazo Puyo	November 28, 2023	Compile	November 11, 1994	
300	Lady Bono!! 1st	November 28, 2023	Compile	June 19, 1992	
301	Madō Monogatari 1-2-3	December 19, 2023	Compile	November 23, 1991	
302	Rakkyo Eating Carbuncle Disk Station Book Type No. 1 Recording Version	December 26, 2023	Compile	October 6, 1993	
303	Lady Bono!! 2nd	December 26, 2023	Compile	July 22, 1992	
304	Bayoen Wars: Great Magic Strategy Story	January 30, 2024	Compile	January 9, 1995	
305	Yutoden	February 13, 2024	System Soft	June 1989	
306	Madō Monogatari: Michikusa Ibun	February 27, 2024	Compile	July 15, 1994	
307	Lady Bono!! 3rd	February 27, 2024	Compile	August 29, 1992	

== Sharp X1 ==
The X1 was a Japanese home computer released by Sharp Corporation in 1982 - and Sharp X1 games started to be made available through Project EGG on November 24, 2001.

There have been 26 Sharp X1 titles available on Project EGG, 1 of which is no longer available for purchase:

No.	Title	Release date	Original rightsholder	Original release	Ref.
1	Euphory	November 24, 2001	System Sacom	1987	
1	Euphory	August 25, 2015	System Sacom	1987	
2	Hydlide	November 24, 2001	T&E Soft	January 1985	
2	Hydlide	February 8, 2022	T&E Soft	January 1985	
2	Hydlide	July 25, 2022	T&E Soft	January 1985	
3	Miracle Warriors: Seal of the Dark Lord	January 24, 2002	Kogado Studio	October 1986	
3	Miracle Warriors: Seal of the Dark Lord	August 30, 2016	Kogado Studio	October 1986	
4	Aspic Special	January 24, 2002	Xtalsoft	1985	
4	Aspic Special	November 24, 2015	Xtalsoft	1985	
4	Aspic Special	May 24, 2022	Xtalsoft	1985	
5	Phantom Heart II	March 24, 2002	Xtalsoft	1986	
5	Phantom Heart II	November 24, 2021	Xtalsoft	1986	
6	Hydlide 3: The Space Memories	July 1, 2002	T&E Soft	1988	
6	Hydlide 3: The Space Memories	January 24, 2022	T&E Soft	1988	
7	Super Laydock: Mission Striker	July 1, 2002	T&E Soft	November 1987	
7	Super Laydock: Mission Striker	July 12, 2021	T&E Soft	November 1987	
7	Super Laydock: Mission Striker	October 24, 2022	T&E Soft	November 1987	
8	Final Zone Wolf	January 2003	Nihon Telenet	1986	
8	Final Zone Wolf	January 24, 2017	Nihon Telenet	1986	
9	Manhattan Requiem: Angels Flying in the Dark	February 4, 2004	Riverhillsoft	1987	
10	Daisenryaku X1	November 8, 2005	Riverhillsoft	1986	
11	Carmine	December 6, 2005	Micro Cabin	1987	
12	~~Daiva Story 3: Trial of Nirvana~~ (delisted)	December 23, 2005	T&E Soft		
13	Relics	October 16, 2007	Bothtec	1986	
13	Relics	October 10, 2016	Bothtec	1986	
14	Sorcerian	September 9, 2014	Nihon Falcom	1988	
15	Alpha	September 30, 2014	Square	1986	
16	Sorcerian Utility Vol. 1	October 21, 2014	Nihon Falcom	1988	
17	Sorcerian Additional Scenario Vol. 1	December 23, 2014	Nihon Falcom	1988	
18	Sorcerian Additional Scenario Vol. 2 – Sengoku Sorcerian	January 20, 2015	Nihon Falcom	October 21, 1988	
19	Sorcerian Additional Scenario Vol. 3 – Pyramid Sorcerian	September 22, 2015	Nihon Falcom	1988	
20	Tritorn	May 24, 2022	Creative Brain	1985	
21	Hydlide: Different Dimension Version	October 18, 2022	T&E Soft	March 1987	
22	Ys I: Ancient Ys Vanished	March 28, 2023	Nihon Falcom	September 1987	
23	Romancia	April 18, 2023	Nihon Falcom	October 6, 1986	
24	Temple of the Sun: Asteka II	June 20, 2023	Nihon Falcom	November 20, 1986	
25	Xanadu	August 22, 2023	Nihon Falcom	November 3, 1985	
26	Dstuka	October 10, 2023	Micronet	1985	

== MSX ==
The MSX was a Japanese home computer released by ASCII Corporation in 1983 - and original MSX games (as opposed to titles from later revisions of the platform) started to be made available through Project EGG on May 17, 2002.

There have been 91 original MSX titles available on Project EGG, 10 of which are no longer available for purchase:

No.	Title	Release date	Original rightsholder	Original release	Ref.
1	Relics	May 17, 2002	Bothtec	1986	
1	Relics	February 1, 2009	Bothtec	1986	
1	Relics	February 1, 2011	Bothtec	1986	
2	Shiro to Kuro Densetsu ~Hyakki-hen~ (Note: Three versions were released onto Project EGG at the same time: the game, without any music; the game, and an MP3 of the original game's extra cassette; the MP3 of the extra cassette only, later moved over to the EHH Music service)	May 17, 2002	Soft Studio Wing	1985	
3	Eggy	June 1, 2002	Bothtec	1985	
3	Eggy	February 1, 2009	Bothtec	1985	
3	Eggy	October 6, 2009 (Note: Updated version for compatibility with Windows Vista, which was the latest version of Windows at this time.)	Bothtec	1985	
4	Hydlide	June 1, 2002	T&E Soft	1985	
4	Hydlide	April 26, 2022	T&E Soft	1985	
5	~~Akanbe Dragon~~ (delisted)	June 1, 2002	Winkysoft		
6	Yokai Detective Chima Chima	August 1, 2002	Bothtec	1985	
6	Yokai Detective Chima Chima	September 7, 2010 (Note: Updated version for compatibility with Windows 7, which was the latest version of Windows at this time.)	Bothtec	1985	
7	American Truck	September 1, 2002	Nihon Telenet	1985	
7	American Truck	May 26, 2015	Nihon Telenet	1985	
8	Valis: The Fantasm Soldier	September 1, 2002	Nihon Telenet	1986	
9	Laptick II	October 1, 2002	dB-SOFT	1986	
10	Volguard	November 1, 2002	dB-SOFT	1984	
10	Volguard	July 23, 2019	dB-SOFT	1984	
11	Zexas Limited	November 1, 2002	dB-SOFT	1985	
11	Zexas Limited	January 14, 2020	dB-SOFT	1985	
12	Zexas: Light Speed 2000 Light Years	November 1, 2002	dB-SOFT	1984	
12	Zexas: Light Speed 2000 Light Years	September 10, 2019	dB-SOFT	1984	
13	~~Chōjikū Yōsai Macross: Countdown~~ (delisted)	December 1, 2002	Bothtec		
14	Hydlide II: Shine of Darkness	January 31, 2003	T&E Soft	1986	
14	Hydlide II: Shine of Darkness	February 25, 2022	T&E Soft	1986	
14	Hydlide II: Shine of Darkness	July 11, 2023	T&E Soft	1986	
15	Anty	March 1, 2003	Bothtec	1984	
15	Anty	April 15, 2009	Bothtec	1984	
15	Anty	January 11, 2011	Bothtec	1984	
16	Pico Pico	March 1, 2003	Micro Cabin	1983	
17	Albatross	March 1, 2003	Nihon Telenet	1986	
18	Star Arthur Densetsu I: Wakusei Mephius	April 28, 2003	T&E Soft	1985	
18	Star Arthur Densetsu I: Wakusei Mephius	July 22, 2005	T&E Soft	1985	
18	Star Arthur Densetsu I: Wakusei Mephius	August 24, 2022	T&E Soft	1985	
19	Topple Zip	May 1, 2003	Bothtec	1986	
19	Topple Zip	December 7, 2010	Bothtec	1986	
20	Hydlide 3: The Space Memories	May 1, 2003	T&E Soft	1987	
20	Hydlide 3: The Space Memories	September 24, 2022	T&E Soft	1987	
21	Bouken Roman	June 1, 2003	System Soft	1986	
21	Bouken Roman	June 30, 2015	System Soft	1986	
22	Super Warrior Zaider: Battle of Peguss	August 1, 2003	Cosmos Computer	1986	
22	Super Warrior Zaider: Battle of Peguss	August 11, 2020	Cosmos Computer	1986	
23	Zanac	August 6, 2003	Compile	1986	
23	Zanac	March 4, 2009	Compile	1986	
23	Zanac	July 12, 2011	Compile	1986	
23	Zanac	May 1, 2012	Compile	1986	
24	Maou Golvellius	September 12, 2003	Compile	1987	
24	Maou Golvellius	May 31, 2010	Compile	1987	
24	Maou Golvellius	December 6, 2016	Compile	1987	
25	~~Rune Master~~ (delisted)	December 16, 2003	Compile		
26	~~Jagur-5~~ (delisted)	May 24, 2004	Hudson Soft	1987	
27	Devil's Heaven	January 14, 2005	Compile	1983	
27	Devil's Heaven	August 4, 2020	Compile	1983	
28	Final Justice	January 14, 2005	Compile	1985	
28	Final Justice	May 5, 2020	Compile	1985	
29	Megalopolis SOS	January 14, 2005	Compile	1983	
29	Megalopolis SOS	July 7, 2020	Compile	1983	
30	Blaster Burn: Budruga Episode III (Part 2)	April 8, 2005	Compile		
30	Blaster Burn: Budruga Episode III (Part 2)	December 24, 2021	Compile		
31	Cross Blaim	April 12, 2005	dB-SOFT	1986	
32	Final Zone Wolf	April 26, 2005	Nihon Telenet	1986	
33	Guardic	June 10, 2005	Compile	1986	
33	Guardic	June 15, 2009	Compile	1986	
33	Guardic	September 29, 2009	Compile	1986	
33	Guardic	July 5, 2016	Compile	1986	
34	Gulkave	June 10, 2005	Compile	1986	
34	Gulkave	September 29, 2009	Compile	1986	
34	Gulkave	June 9, 2020	Compile	1986	
34	Gulkave	July 9, 2021	Compile	1986	
34	Gulkave	March 24, 2022	Compile	1986	
34	Gulkave	June 6, 2023	Compile	1986	
35	The Great Escape	July 5, 2005	Carry Lab	1985	
35	The Great Escape	April 14, 2020	Carry Lab	1985	
35	The Great Escape	January 5, 2021	Carry Lab	1985	
36	Battleship Clapton II	July 22, 2005	T&E Soft	1984	
36	Battleship Clapton II	May 2, 2022	T&E Soft	1984	
37	Morico Threat Incident	September 6, 2005	Soft Studio Wing	1985	
37	Morico Threat Incident	June 28, 2022	Soft Studio Wing	1985	
38	Anaza: Kaleidoscope Special	November 1, 2005	HOT-B	1987	
39	Daiva Story 4: Asura's Bloodfeud	December 23, 2005	T&E Soft	1987	
39	Daiva Story 4: Asura's Bloodfeud	April 13, 2021	T&E Soft	1987	
39	Daiva Story 4: Asura's Bloodfeud	June 24, 2022	T&E Soft	1987	
39	Daiva Story 4: Asura's Bloodfeud	May 2, 2023	T&E Soft	1987	
40	Flappy Limited '85	May 9, 2006	dB-SOFT	1985	
41	Robo Crush	June 6, 2006	System Soft	1990	
42	Psychic War: Cosmic Soldier 2	November 21, 2006	Kogado Studio	1987	
43	~~Elevator Action~~ (delisted on May 17, 2008)	March 9, 2007	Taito		
44	~~Gyrodine~~ (delisted on May 17, 2008)	March 9, 2007	Taito		
45	~~Scramble Formation~~ (delisted on May 17, 2008)	March 23, 2007	Taito		
46	~~Front Line~~ (delisted on May 17, 2008)	March 23, 2007	Taito		
47	~~Rastan Saga~~ (delisted on May 17, 2008)	April 27, 2007	Taito		
48	~~Mahjong Friend~~ (delisted on May 17, 2008)	April 27, 2007	Taito		
49	Romancia	December 4, 2007	Nihon Falcom	1986	
49	Romancia	June 26, 2018	Nihon Falcom	1986	
50	Spelunker	April 28, 2009	Irem	1986	
50	Spelunker	April 1, 2012	Irem	1986	
51	Harry Fox MSX Special	October 13, 2009	Micro Cabin	1986	
52	Miracle Warriors: Seal of the Dark Lord	January 12, 2010	Kogado Studio	1987	
53	Blaster Burn: Budruga Episode III (Part 1)	February 26, 2010	Compile		
54	Xanadu: Dragon Slayer II	February 26, 2013	Nihon Falcom	November 6, 1987	
55	Dragon Slayer IV: Drasle Family	March 19, 2013	Nihon Falcom	1987	
56	Deep Dungeon: Madō Senki	June 25, 2013	HummingBirdSoft	1988	
56	Deep Dungeon: Madō Senki	November 1, 2015	HummingBirdSoft	1988	
57	Hustle! Chumy	October 29, 2013	Compile	1984	
57	Hustle! Chumy	December 2, 2014	Compile	1984	
58	Deep Dungeon II: Yūshi no Monshō	February 12, 2014	HummingBirdSoft	1988	
58	Deep Dungeon II: Yūshi no Monshō	January 9, 2018	HummingBirdSoft	1988	
59	Dream Continent Adventure	April 11, 2014	Konami	October 28, 1986	
60	Parodius: The Octopus Saves the Earth	April 11, 2014	Konami	April 28, 1988	
61	Majou Densetsu	July 22, 2014	Konami	1986	
62	TwinBee	August 19, 2014	Konami	May 25, 1986	
63	Yie Ar Kung-Fu	October 28, 2014	Konami	January 10, 1985	
64	Antarctic Adventure	November 25, 2014	Konami	December 1983	
65	Yie Ar Kung-Fu II	November 25, 2014	Konami	December 12, 1985	
66	Konami's Soccer	December 23, 2014	Konami	December 21, 1985	
67	Sky Jaguar	December 23, 2014	Konami	December 1984	
68	Gradius 2	January 27, 2015	Konami	August 22, 1987	
69	Magical Tree	January 27, 2015	Konami	November 1984	
70	Hyper Sports 2	February 17, 2015	Konami	November 1984	
71	The Maze of Galious	March 23, 2015	Konami	April 18, 1987	
72	Gofer's Ambition Episode II	April 21, 2015	Konami	January 27, 1989	
73	Salamander	May 19, 2015	Konami	December 26, 1987	
74	Märchen Veil	December 8, 2015	System Sacom	1987	
74	Märchen Veil	June 1, 2021	System Sacom	1987	
75	Knightmare III: Shalom	January 26, 2016	Konami	December 23, 1987	
76	Dominom	June 22, 2017	Compile Maru	2017	
77	Thexder	February 25, 2020	Game Arts	1986	
78	Borfes and the Five Demons	July 28, 2020	Xtalsoft	1987	
78	Borfes and the Five Demons	October 24, 2022	Xtalsoft	1987	
79	Aramo	September 22, 2020	Creative Brain	1986	
80	Super Laydock: Mission Striker	September 29, 2020	T&E Soft	1987	
81	Dynamite Go! Go! (Note: A free demo version is also available.)	March 19, 2021	D4 Enterprise	2021	
82	Pyramid Warp	June 8, 2021	T&E Soft	1983	
82	Pyramid Warp	January 24, 2022	T&E Soft	1983	
82	Pyramid Warp	August 2, 2022	T&E Soft	1983	
83	Aquapolis SOS	September 7, 2021	Compile	1983	
84	Bee & Flower	October 5, 2021	Compile	1983	
85	Tritorn	January 18, 2022	Creative Brain	1986	
86	Crusader	March 1, 2022	Compile	1985	
87	Shiro to Kuro Densetsu ~Rinne Tensei-hen~	March 29, 2022	Soft Studio Wing	1986	
88	Shiro to Kuro Densetsu ~Asuka-hen~	April 26, 2022	Soft Studio Wing	1987	
89	Courageous Perseus	July 5, 2022	Cosmos Computer	1985	
90	C-SO!	August 16, 2022	Compile	1985	
91	Theseus	June 25, 2024	ASCII Corporation	1984	

== MSX2 ==
The MSX2 was a Japanese home computer released by ASCII Corporation in 1985, as an upgraded version of their earlier MSX platform - and MSX2 games started to be made available through Project EGG on May 17, 2002.

There have been 133 MSX2 titles available on Project EGG, 11 of which are no longer available for purchase:

No.	Title	Release date	Original rightsholder	Original release	Ref.
1	Fray in Magical Adventure	May 17, 2002	Micro Cabin	December 6, 1990	
1	Fray in Magical Adventure	September 23, 2014	Micro Cabin	December 6, 1990	
2	Laydock	May 17, 2002	T&E Soft	1986	
2	Laydock	October 4, 2022	T&E Soft	1986	
3	Relics	June 1, 2002	Bothtec	1986	-
3	Relics	July 6, 2021	Bothtec	1986	
4	Hydlide	June 1, 2002	T&E Soft	1985	
4	Hydlide	December 17, 2019	T&E Soft	1985	
5	The Tower of Cabin	July 1, 2002	Micro Cabin	1992	
6	Xak: The Art of Visual Stage	July 1, 2002	Micro Cabin	1989	
7	Emmy II	August 1, 2002	Kogado Studio	1986	
8	Schwarzschild: Kyouran no Ginga	August 1, 2002	Kogado Studio	1989	
8	Schwarzschild: Kyouran no Ginga	February 23, 2016	Kogado Studio	1989	
9	Valis: The Fantasm Soldier II	September 1, 2002	Nihon Telenet	1989	
10	XZR: Hakai no Gūzō	September 1, 2002	Nihon Telenet	1988	
10	XZR: Hakai no Gūzō	July 15, 2014	Nihon Telenet	1988	
11	Ryuu no Hanazono	October 1, 2002	Family Soft	1992	
12	Arcus	October 1, 2002	Nihon Telenet	1989	
13	Arcus II: Silent Symphony	October 1, 2002	Nihon Telenet	1990	
13	Arcus II: Silent Symphony	August 24, 2021	Nihon Telenet	1990	
14	Niko 2	October 1, 2002	Nihon Telenet	1991	
15	XZR II	October 1, 2002	Nihon Telenet	1989	
15	XZR II	January 31, 2017	Nihon Telenet	1989	
16	Kami no Seito (Note: Two versions were released onto Project EGG at the same time: the game, with music; MP3s of the game's soundtrack, later moved over to the EGG Music service)	October 1, 2002	Panther Software	1989	
17	MSX Train	November 1, 2002	Family Soft	1993	
18	Anti-Life Trooper Androgynous	November 1, 2002	Nihon Telenet	1987	
18	Anti-Life Trooper Androgynous	October 26, 2021	Nihon Telenet	1987	
19	Woody Poco	December 1, 2002	dB-SOFT	1987	
19	Woody Poco	November 20, 2018	dB-SOFT	1987	
20	~~MSX Train 2~~ (delisted)	December 1, 2002	Family Soft		
21	Mashō Denki La Valeur	December 1, 2002	Kogado Studio	1990	
21	Mashō Denki La Valeur	June 30, 2020	Kogado Studio	1990	
22	Arcshu: Kagerou no Jidai o Koete	December 1, 2002	Nihon Telenet	1990	
22	Arcshu: Kagerou no Jidai o Koete	July 11, 2017	Nihon Telenet	1990	
23	Palamedes	January 10, 2003	HOT-B	1990	
23	Palamedes	January 14, 2004 (Note: This version was for use on Pocket PC only.)	HOT-B	1990	
23	Palamedes	March 17, 2020	HOT-B	1990	
24	Harajuku Afterdark	January 10, 2003	Kogado Studio	1989	
24	Harajuku Afterdark	October 23, 2018	Kogado Studio	1989	
25	Xak II: Rising of the Redmoon	January 10, 2003	Micro Cabin	1990	
25	Xak II: Rising of the Redmoon	February 26, 2019	Micro Cabin	1990	
26	Ninja	January 31, 2003	Bothtec	1988	
26	Ninja	July 2, 2019	Bothtec	1988	
27	Rick & Mick's Great Adventure	January 31, 2003	HummingBirdSoft	1987	
27	Rick & Mick's Great Adventure	November 19, 2019	HummingBirdSoft	1987	
27	Rick & Mick's Great Adventure	July 9, 2021	HummingBirdSoft	1987	
27	Rick & Mick's Great Adventure	February 25, 2022	HummingBirdSoft	1987	
28	Xak Precious Package: The Tower of Gazzel	January 31, 2003	Micro Cabin	1991	
28	Xak Precious Package: The Tower of Gazzel	January 16, 2018	Micro Cabin	1991	
29	Gaudi: Wind of Barcelona	January 31, 2003	Nihon Telenet	1989	
30	Mr. Ghost	January 31, 2003	System Sacom	1988	
30	Mr. Ghost	July 9, 2021	System Sacom	1988	
30	Mr. Ghost	September 24, 2022	System Sacom	1988	
31	~~Legend of the Galactic Heroes~~ (Note: Three versions were released at the same time: the game by itself; a version with the subtitle "Special Set"; a version with the subtitle "Power Up & Scenario") (delisted)	March 1, 2003	Bothtec		
32	~~Legend of the Galactic Heroes II~~ (Note: Three versions were released at the same time: the game by itself; a version with the subtitle "DX Set"; a version with the subtitle "DX Kit") (delisted)	April 1, 2003	Bothtec		
33	Apermia Dock	April 1, 2003	T&E Soft	1989	
33	Apermia Dock	June 7, 2022	T&E Soft	1989	
34	Idaten Ikase Otoko: Mugiko ni Aitai	May 1, 2003	Family Soft	1989	
35	Daisenryaku	May 1, 2003	Micro Cabin	1987	
36	Idaten Ikase Otoko 2: Jinsei no Imi	June 1, 2003	Family Soft	1989	
37	Keiji Daidaigeki: Shachou Reijou Yuuka Jiken	June 1, 2003	Family Soft	1987	
38	Schwarzschild II: Teikoku no Haishin	June 1, 2003	Kogado Studio	1990	
38	Schwarzschild II: Teikoku no Haishin	December 11, 2018	Kogado Studio	1990	
39	TNT	July 1, 2003	Bothtec	1987	
39	TNT	May 14, 2009	Bothtec	1987	
39	TNT	August 3, 2010	Bothtec	1987	
40	Idaten Ikase Otoko 3: Sengo Hen	July 1, 2003	Family Soft	1989	
41	Mon Mon Monster	July 1, 2003	HOT-B	1989	
41	Mon Mon Monster	April 20, 2021	HOT-B	1989	
42	Super Daisenryaku	July 18, 2003	System Soft	1989	
43	~~Amber Testament~~ (delisted)	December 1, 2003	Riverhillsoft		
43	~~Amber Testament~~ (delisted)	December 1, 2003	Riverhillsoft		
44	Madōshi Raruba	December 4, 2003 (Note: Originally this was to release in August 2003, but it was delayed.)	Compile	1990	
44	Madōshi Raruba	December 4, 2003	Compile	1990	
44	Madōshi Raruba	March 31, 2015	Compile	1990	
44	Madōshi Raruba	July 9, 2021	Compile	1990	
45	Burai: Jōkan	January 23, 2004	Riverhillsoft	1989	
46	Burai: Gekan - Kanketsu-hen	February 4, 2004	Riverhillsoft	1992	
47	Mid-Garts	February 27, 2004	Nihon Telenet	1989	
48	Nyanpi	March 12, 2004	Compile	1990	
48	Nyanpi	February 1, 2009	Compile	1990	
48	Nyanpi	March 1, 2011	Compile	1990	
49	Green Crystal	September 7, 2004	Compile	1992	
49	Green Crystal	October 3, 2017	Compile	1992	
50	Final Jaboon	September 7, 2004	Compile	1992	
50	Final Jaboon	February 1, 2009	Compile	1992	
50	Final Jaboon	September 5, 2017	Compile	1992	
51	Jaboon Runner	September 7, 2004	Compile	1992	
51	Jaboon Runner	February 1, 2009	Compile	1992	
51	Jaboon Runner	June 6, 2017	Compile	1992	
52	Jump Hero II: Jinsei wa Jaboon	September 7, 2004	Compile	1992	
52	Jump Hero II: Jinsei wa Jaboon	February 1, 2009	Compile	1992	
52	Jump Hero II: Jinsei wa Jaboon	March 7, 2017	Compile	1992	
53	Kerosuke no Gokkan Jigoku	September 7, 2004	Compile	1992	
53	Kerosuke no Gokkan Jigoku	February 1, 2009	Compile	1992	
53	Kerosuke no Gokkan Jigoku	July 4, 2017	Compile	1992	
54	Heian Yokai Den	November 2, 2004	Compile	1991	
54	Heian Yokai Den	April 4, 2017	Compile	1991	
55	Randar's Adventure	November 2, 2004	Compile	1989	
55	Randar's Adventure	August 8, 2017	Compile	1989	
55	Randar's Adventure	June 5, 2018	Compile	1989	
56	~~USA-Jong~~ (delisted)	November 2, 2004	Compile	1989	
57	Samurai King Mega On Z	November 12, 2004	Compile	1989	
57	Samurai King Mega On Z	November 14, 2010	Compile	1989	
57	Samurai King Mega On Z	May 2, 2017	Compile	1989	
58	Randar II: Revenge of Death	November 12, 2004	Compile	1989	
58	Randar II: Revenge of Death	November 14, 2010	Compile	1989	
58	Randar II: Revenge of Death	December 24, 2019	Compile	1989	
58	Randar II: Revenge of Death	November 10, 2020	Compile	1989	
59	~~Aleste 2~~ (delisted)	November 26, 2004 (Note: Only released on AC PLUS / EGG Plus. It did not receive a Project EGG version after the service merger.) (Note: The pre-release version of Aleste 2 only)	Compile		
59	~~Aleste 2~~ (delisted)	May 13, 2005	Compile		
59	~~Aleste 2~~ (delisted)	October 18, 2005	Compile		
60	~~Madō Monogatari 1-2-3~~ (delisted)	November 26, 2004	Compile		
61	Rune Master	November 26, 2004	Compile	1989	
61	Rune Master	February 9, 2007	Compile	1989	
61	Rune Master	June 7, 2016	Compile	1989	
62	Nyanpi ☆ Collection	February 10, 2005	Compile		
62	Nyanpi ☆ Collection	July 30, 2009	Compile		
62	Nyanpi ☆ Collection	August 3, 2021	Compile		
63	Blaster Burn: Budruga Episode III (Part 1)	March 2, 2005	Compile		
63	Blaster Burn: Budruga Episode III (Part 1)	July 9, 2021	Compile		
63	Blaster Burn: Budruga Episode III (Part 1)	January 24, 2022	Compile		
64	~~Aleste~~ (delisted)	May 13, 2005	Compile		
64	~~Aleste~~ (delisted)	October 12, 2005	Compile		
64	~~Aleste~~ (delisted)	September 6, 2011	Compile		
65	Chuuka Taisen	May 31, 2005	HOT-B	1988	
66	Mad Rider	June 14, 2005	Carry Lab	1987	
66	Mad Rider	March 3, 2020	Carry Lab	1987	
67	Casablanca: Ni Ai wo Satsujinsha ha Jikuu wo Koete	June 21, 2005	Thinking Rabbit	1988	
67	Casablanca: Ni Ai wo Satsujinsha ha Jikuu wo Koete	March 19, 2019	Thinking Rabbit	1988	
68	Shin Maou Golvellius	June 24, 2005	Compile	1988	
68	Shin Maou Golvellius	August 2, 2005	Compile	1988	
68	Shin Maou Golvellius	February 6, 2018 (Note: A special encyclopaedia about Shin Maou Golvellius)	Compile	1989	
68	Shin Maou Golvellius	April 7, 2020 (Note: A special free version that starts on the horizontal-scrolling stage.)	Compile	1988	
68	Shin Maou Golvellius	June 2, 2020 (Note: A special free version that starts on the vertical-scrolling stage.)	Compile	1988	
68	Shin Maou Golvellius	September 21, 2021	Compile	1988	
68	Shin Maou Golvellius	January 24, 2022	Compile	1988	
69	Super Cooks	June 24, 2005	Compile	1989	
69	Super Cooks	August 6, 2019	Compile	1989	
70	Return of Jelda	June 28, 2005	Carry Lab	1987	
70	Return of Jelda	September 8, 2020	Carry Lab	1987	
70	Return of Jelda	June 24, 2022	Carry Lab	1987	
70	Return of Jelda	December 6, 2022	Carry Lab	1987	
71	~~Thexder~~ (delisted on December 12, 2009)	July 15, 2005	Game Arts		
72	Fire Hawk: Thexder - The Second Contact	July 15, 2005	Game Arts	1989	
72	Fire Hawk: Thexder - The Second Contact	May 26, 2020	Game Arts	1989	
73	D.C. Connection	July 19, 2005	Riverhillsoft	1989	
74	Elthlead	August 9, 2005	Masaya Games	1988	
74	Elthlead	July 27, 2021	Masaya Games	1988	
75	Peach Up Collection I (Note: This collection contains the following titles: The Sanatorium of Romance; The Sanatorium of Romance 2; Trouble Partners: The Great Imperial Capital Operation; School Executioner Rabbit; Peach Club: Around the World - Quiz Edition; Peach Club: Around the World - Sugoroku Edition; Peach Club II: Girls Saver; Kurukuru Puzzle: DON on the 3 Screens!; DON on the 3 Screens! that Came Back!; DON on the 3 Screens! III)	August 12, 2005	Momonoki House		
76	Peach Up Collection II (Note: This collection contains the following titles: Ultimate Peach; Cosmic Fleet; Nurse Academy; Momonoki House Petit Game Box; Female Dormitory Tour: Seesaw Peroncho; Seesaw Peroncho Special; Pink Dynamite; Super Peach Slot; Hyper Block; Hana Sisters)	September 7, 2005	Momonoki House		
77	Peach Up Collection III (Note: This collection contains the following titles: Outer Limits; Outer Limits Extra; Outer Limits Extra R; Guriel's Grail; Guriel's Grail Excellent; Mirames; Mirames: Auna in the Mirror; Chin and Hands; Chin and Hands Again)	September 25, 2005	Momonoki House		
78	The Stone of Agni	October 25, 2005	HummingBirdSoft	1989	
78	The Stone of Agni	April 26, 2022	HummingBirdSoft	1989	
79	Daiva Story 5: The Cup of Soma	December 23, 2005	T&E Soft	March 1987	
79	Daiva Story 5: The Cup of Soma	September 12, 2023	T&E Soft	March 1987	
80	Strategic Mars	April 14, 2006	dB-SOFT	1988	
81	Meizu-kun	May 16, 2006	Nihon Telenet	1987	
82	Campaign-ban Daisenryaku II	August 22, 2006	System Soft	1992	
82	Campaign-ban Daisenryaku II	October 24, 2017	System Soft	1992	
83	Crimson	October 24, 2006	Xtalsoft	1987	
83	Crimson	February 25, 2022	Xtalsoft	1987	
84	Frantic	October 27, 2006	ANMA	1992	
85	Crimson II: The Counterattack of the Evil God	November 14, 2006	Xtalsoft	1989	
85	Crimson II: The Counterattack of the Evil God	January 24, 2022	Xtalsoft	1989	
86	Dragon Slayer IV: Drasle Family	December 28, 2006	Nihon Falcom	1987	
86	Dragon Slayer IV: Drasle Family	February 27, 2018	Nihon Falcom	1987	
87	Ys II: Ancient Ys Vanished – The Final Chapter	December 28, 2006	Nihon Falcom	1988	
87	Ys II: Ancient Ys Vanished – The Final Chapter	April 25, 2017	Nihon Falcom	1988	
88	Ys III: Wanderers from Ys	December 28, 2006	Nihon Falcom	1989	
88	Ys III: Wanderers from Ys	May 30, 2017	Nihon Falcom	1989	
89	Ys I: Ancient Ys Vanished	December 28, 2006	Nihon Falcom	1987	
89	Ys I: Ancient Ys Vanished	March 28, 2017	Nihon Falcom	1987	
90	Rune Master II	February 9, 2007	Compile	1990	
90	Rune Master II	March 2, 2021	Compile	1990	
91	Rune Master III: Sangoku Eiketsuden	February 9, 2007	Compile	1991	
91	Rune Master III: Sangoku Eiketsuden	November 2, 2021	Compile	1991	
92	Psycho World	February 13, 2007	Hertz	1988	
93	Hydefos: Hyper Defending Force System	March 6, 2007	Hertz	1989	
94	Crimson III	July 17, 2007	Xtalsoft	1990	
94	Crimson III	December 24, 2021	Xtalsoft	1990	
95	Romancia	May 6, 2008	Nihon Falcom	1986	
95	Romancia	September 26, 2017	Nihon Falcom	1986	
96	Dragon Slayer: The Legend of Heroes	September 30, 2008	Nihon Falcom	1990	
96	Dragon Slayer: The Legend of Heroes	May 29, 2018	Nihon Falcom	1990	
97	Dires -giger・loop-	December 9, 2008	Bothtec	1987	
97	Dires -giger・loop-	December 21, 2009	Bothtec	1987	
97	Dires -giger・loop-	October 4, 2011	Bothtec	1987	
98	~~Aleste (English version)~~ (delisted on December 22, 2011)	February 1, 2009	Compile		
99	~~Aleste 2 (English version)~~ (delisted on December 22, 2011)	April 7, 2009	Compile		
100	Super Lode Runner	December 22, 2009	Irem	1987	
100	Super Lode Runner	April 1, 2012	Irem	1987	
101	Blaster Burn: Budruga Episode III (Part 2)	March 31, 2010	Compile		
102	Maou Golvellius 2	September 24, 2010	Compile	1998	
103	Seilane	November 23, 2010	Micro Cabin	1988	
104	Zanac EX	August 9, 2011	Compile	1986	
104	Zanac EX	November 1, 2011	Compile	1986	
105	Mighty Battle Skin Panic	August 9, 2011	Gainax	1993	
106	Arugisu no Tsubasa	April 22, 2014	Kogado Studio	1988	
107	Gokudō Jintori	May 20, 2014	Micronet	1989	
108	Tír-nan-óg	June 17, 2014	System Soft	1990	
109	Akumajō Dracula	July 22, 2014	Konami	October 30, 1986	
110	Uṣas	June 23, 2015	Konami	January 11, 1987	
111	Space Manbow	July 28, 2015	Konami	December 22, 1989	
112	Randar Burn: Blaster Burn April Fool	November 7, 2017	Compile	1990	
113	Rabbit Sparrow: Revival of the Hajao	November 21, 2017	Compile	1989	
113	Rabbit Sparrow: Revival of the Hajao	April 2, 2019	Compile	1989	
114	Blaster Burn Score Trial	December 5, 2017	Compile		
115	Children's Wars	April 10, 2018	Compile	1989	
115	Children's Wars	June 4, 2019	Compile	1989	
116	Undead Line	April 23, 2019	T&E Soft	1989	
116	Undead Line	December 24, 2021	T&E Soft	1989	
117	Hydlide 3: The Space Memories	June 25, 2019	T&E Soft	1987	
118	Akanbe Dragon	February 11, 2020	Winkysoft	1988	
118	Akanbe Dragon	March 24, 2022	Winkysoft	1988	
119	American Success	September 1, 2020	Winkysoft	1989	
120	Dragon Quiz	December 8, 2020	Compile	1991	
120	Dragon Quiz	May 24, 2022	Compile	1991	
120	Dragon Quiz	January 10, 2023	Compile	1991	
121	Greatest Driver	December 29, 2020	T&E Soft	1988	
121	Greatest Driver	March 24, 2022	T&E Soft	1988	
122	Super Tritorn	January 19, 2021	Creative Brain	1986	
123	Navitune: The Dragon Voyage	February 23, 2021	Kogado Studio	1989	
124	Randar's Adventure III: A Magician Fascinated by Darkness	March 15, 2022	Compile	1990	
125	Makyu Den	May 31, 2022	Soft Studio Wing	1989	
126	Hadou no Hyouteki: Legend of the Melvel	July 19, 2022	Soft Studio Wing	1988	
127	Future	November 15, 2022	Creative Brain	1987	
128	Record of Lodoss War: The Gray Witch	March 22, 2023	HummingBirdSoft	1989	
129	Stray Cat Story	October 3, 2023	Compile	September 7, 1990	
130	Madō Monogatari 1-2-3	October 17, 2023	Compile	June 15, 1990	
131	Carbuncle Pi	October 24, 2023	Compile	April 9, 1991	
132	B.G.V. Christmas	December 5, 2023	Compile	December 8, 1988	
133	B.G.V. Mysterious Night	February 6, 2024	Compile	July 9, 1991	

== MSX2+ ==
The MSX2+ was a Japanese home computer released by ASCII Corporation in 1988, as an upgraded version of their earlier MSX platform - and MSX2+ games started to be made available through Project EGG on July 1, 2002.

There have been 4 MSX2+ titles available on Project EGG, 1 of which is no longer available for purchase:

No.	Title	Release date	Original rightsholder	Original release	Ref.
1	Laydock 2: Last Attack	July 1, 2002	T&E Soft	November 19, 1988	
1	Laydock 2: Last Attack	October 29, 2019	T&E Soft	November 19, 1988	
1	Laydock 2: Last Attack	May 24, 2022	T&E Soft	November 19, 1988	
2	Master of Monsters	March 5, 2013	System Soft	1989	
3	Amber Testament	May 9, 2019	Riverhillsoft	1988	
4	~~Shin Maou Golvellius~~ (delisted)	July 9, 2021	Compile		

== Sega Mega Drive ==
The Mega Drive was a Japanese video game console released by Sega in 1988 - and Mega Drive games started to be made available through Project EGG on September 17, 2002.

There have been 34 Mega Drive titles available on Project EGG, 1 of which is no longer available for purchase:

No.	Title	Release date	Original rightsholder	Original release	Ref.
1	Ys III: Wanderers from Ys	September 17, 2002	Nihon Falcom	1991	
2	Arcus Odyssey	October 15, 2003	Nihon Telenet	1991	
3	Valis: The Fantasm Soldier	October 15, 2003	Nihon Telenet	1991	
4	SD Valis	November 11, 2003	Nihon Telenet	February 14, 1992	
5	Zan: Yasha Enbukyoku	November 11, 2003	Nihon Telenet	1991	
6	Chelnov	February 9, 2010	Data East	1992	
6	Chelnov	July 21, 2020	Data East	1992	
7	Crude Buster	May 18, 2010	Data East	1992	
8	Midnight Resistance	June 29, 2010	Data East	1991	
9	Side Pocket	August 17, 2010	Data East	1992	
10	Gaiares	December 20, 2011	Nihon Telenet	1990	
11	Granada	May 15, 2012	Nihon Telenet	1990	
12	Valis III	June 19, 2012	Nihon Telenet	1991	
13	Curse	August 20, 2013	Micronet	1989	
14	FZ War Chronicle Axis	November 12, 2013	Nihon Telenet	1990	
15	Ambition of Caesar	March 11, 2014	Micronet	1991	
16	Aero Blasters	September 23, 2014	Kaneko	1991	
17	Exile: Into the Boundaries of Time	November 11, 2014	Nihon Telenet	1991	
18	Ambition of Caesar II	December 9, 2014	Micronet	1992	
19	Langrisser	March 31, 2015	Masaya Games	1991	
20	Wani Wani World	May 12, 2015	Kaneko	1992	
21	Power Athlete	June 9, 2015	Kaneko	1992	
22	Langrisser II	August 11, 2015	Masaya Games	1994	
23	Assault Suit Leynos	September 8, 2015	Masaya Games	March 16, 1990	
24	Gynoug	May 10, 2016	Masaya Games	January 25, 1991	
25	Gley Lancer	July 12, 2016	Masaya Games	July 17, 1992	
26	El Viento	September 20, 2016	Nihon Telenet	1991	
27	Vixen 357	December 19, 2017	Masaya Games	1992	
28	Mamono Hunter Yohko: The 7th Warning Bell	March 20, 2018	Masaya Games	1991	
29	~~Captain Lang~~ (delisted)	May 15, 2018	Data East	1993	
30	Retsuden Super Dino Land	August 21, 2018	Nihon Telenet	1991	
31	Kuuga: Operation Code Vapor Trail	April 21, 2020	Data East	1991	
32	Undead Line	August 10, 2021	T&E Soft	1991	
33	Star Cruiser	November 30, 2021	Masaya Games	1990	
34	Madō Monogatari I	January 30, 2024	Compile	March 22, 1996	

== PC-6001mkII ==
The PC-6001mkII was a Japanese home computer released by NEC in 1983, as an upgraded version of their earlier PC-6001 platform - and PC-6001 games started to be made available through Project EGG on October 1, 2002.

There have been 15 PC-6001mkII titles available on Project EGG, 1 of which is no longer available for purchase:

No.	Title	Release date	Original rightsholder	Original release	Ref.
1	~~Hydlide~~ (delisted)	October 1, 2002	T&E Soft		
2	American Truck	April 9, 2004	Nihon Telenet	1985	
2	American Truck	March 22, 2022	Nihon Telenet	1985	
3	Volguard	July 23, 2004	dB-SOFT	1985	
3	Volguard	February 15, 2022	dB-SOFT	1985	
4	The Great Escape	February 9, 2021	Carry Lab	1985	
4	The Great Escape	September 24, 2022	Carry Lab	1985	
5	Lizard	May 11, 2021	Xtalsoft	1984	
5	Lizard	August 24, 2022	Xtalsoft	1984	
6	Tritorn	August 31, 2021	Creative Brain	1985	
7	Aspic	September 14, 2021	Xtalsoft	1986	
7	Aspic	September 24, 2022	Xtalsoft	1986	
8	Harry Fox	October 19, 2021	Micro Cabin	1984	
9	Harry Fox: Snow Demon King	November 16, 2021	Micro Cabin	1985	
10	Rook	April 5, 2022	Carry Lab	1985	
11	Star Arthur Densetsu I: Wakusei Mephius	April 12, 2022	T&E Soft	1983	
12	Jelda	May 17, 2022	Carry Lab	1984	
13	Star Arthur Densetsu II: Dark Nebula	August 9, 2022	T&E Soft	1984	
14	Led Zone	November 8, 2022	T&E Soft	1983	
15	Star Arthur Densetsu III: Terra 4001	May 9, 2023	T&E Soft	1984	

== X68000 ==
The X68000 was a Japanese home computer released by Sharp Corporation in 1987 - and X68000 games started to be made available through Project EGG on August 29, 2003.

There have been 66 X68000 titles available on Project EGG, 3 of which are no longer available for purchase:

No.	Title	Release date	Original rightsholder	Original release	Ref.
1	Genocide	August 29, 2003 (Note: Trial version to test out the X68000 emulator)	ZOOM	July 23, 1989	
1	Genocide	October 16, 2003	ZOOM	July 23, 1989	
2	Asuka 120% Burning Fest.	November 11, 2003	Family Soft	1994	
3	Phalanx: The Enforce Fighter A-114	December 3, 2003	ZOOM	1991	
4	Mad Stalker: Full Metal Forth	February 21, 2004	Family Soft	1994	
5	Granada	February 21, 2004	Nihon Telenet	April 20, 1990	
5	Granada	May 16, 2023	Nihon Telenet	April 20, 1990	
6	Meurtre d'un Clown	February 21, 2004	Thinking Rabbit	1988	
7	Metal Sight	March 12, 2004	System Sacom	1989	
7	Metal Sight	July 9, 2021	System Sacom	1989	
8	Casablanca: Ni Ai wo Satsujinsha ha Jikuu wo Koete	March 12, 2004	Thinking Rabbit	1988	
9	Death Bringer	March 26, 2004	Nihon Telenet	March 10, 1989	
9	Death Bringer	July 26, 2022	Nihon Telenet	March 10, 1989	
10	Undead Line	March 26, 2004	T&E Soft	1990	
10	Undead Line	March 30, 2021	T&E Soft	1990	
10	Undead Line	September 24, 2022	T&E Soft	1990	
11	The Man I Love	April 9, 2004	Thinking Rabbit	1989	
12	Genocide 2: Master of the Dark Communion	April 16, 2004	ZOOM	1991	
13	Lagoon	May 24, 2004	ZOOM	1990	
14	KU 2	July 23, 2004	Panther Software	1993	
15	Blood of Darkness: The Predestined Homicides #1	August 24, 2004	System Sacom	1990	
15	Blood of Darkness: The Predestined Homicides #1	March 24, 2022	System Sacom	1990	
16	Blood of Darkness: The Predestined Homicides #2 - Final Edition	October 27, 2004	System Sacom	1991	
16	Blood of Darkness: The Predestined Homicides #2 - Final Edition	February 25, 2022	System Sacom	1991	
17	FZ War Chronicle Axis	November 11, 2004	Nihon Telenet	1990	
18	Rune Worth: Black Prince	April 5, 2005	T&E Soft	1990	
18	Rune Worth: Black Prince	September 24, 2022	T&E Soft	1990	
19	Soft de Hard na Monogatari	April 19, 2005	System Sacom	1988	
19	Soft de Hard na Monogatari	November 24, 2021	System Sacom	1988	
20	Manhattan Requiem: Angels Flying in the Dark	May 3, 2005	Riverhillsoft	1987	
21	Xak: The Art of Visual Stage	May 17, 2005	Micro Cabin	1990	
22	Soft de Hard na Monogatari II	May 24, 2005	System Sacom	1989	
22	Soft de Hard na Monogatari II	April 26, 2022	System Sacom	1989	
23	J.B. Harold Murder Club DX	June 7, 2005	Riverhillsoft	1988	
23	J.B. Harold Murder Club DX	September 27, 2016	Riverhillsoft	1988	
24	Kiss of Murder	July 12, 2005	Riverhillsoft	1987	
25	Tenka Tōitsu	July 26, 2005	System Soft	1989	
26	Hotel Wars	February 28, 2006	Bothtec	1989	
26	Hotel Wars	July 9, 2021	Bothtec	1989	
26	Hotel Wars	November 24, 2021	Bothtec	1989	
27	Master of Monsters II	March 28, 2006	System Soft	1992	
28	Hydlide 3 S.V.	July 18, 2006	T&E Soft	1990	
28	Hydlide 3 S.V.	May 24, 2022	T&E Soft	1990	
29	Air Combat II	November 28, 2006	System Soft	1989	
30	Lightning Bacchus: The Knight of Iron	December 5, 2006	Masaya Games	March 27, 1989	
30	Lightning Bacchus: The Knight of Iron	September 27, 2022	Masaya Games	March 27, 1989	
31	Bretonne Lais	December 12, 2006	System Soft	1990	
32	Campaign-ban Daisenryaku II	December 19, 2006	System Soft	1991	
33	Square Resort: Hyper Tank Battle	January 9, 2007	Family Soft	1992	
34	The History of Elthlead	January 16, 2007	Masaya Games	March 30, 1989	
34	The History of Elthlead	August 23, 2022	Masaya Games	March 30, 1989	
35	War Torn Versnag	January 30, 2007	Family Soft	1993	
36	Zan: Kagerō no Jidai	June 19, 2007	Micronet	1989	
37	~~Armored Trooper Votoms: Dead Ash~~ (delisted)	July 14, 2009	Family Soft	1991	
38	Relics	December 8, 2009	Bothtec	1993	
38	Relics	July 9, 2021	Bothtec	1993	
38	Relics	August 24, 2022	Bothtec	1993	
39	Ys III: Wanderers from Ys	June 22, 2010	Nihon Falcom	1990	
40	Star Trader	August 10, 2010	Nihon Falcom	1991	
41	Star Cruiser	November 29, 2011	Arsys Software	1989	
42	Valis: The Fantasm Soldier II	January 24, 2012	Nihon Telenet	1989	
43	Sol-Feace	February 28, 2012	Nihon Telenet	1990	
44	Knight Arms: The Hybrid Framer	November 20, 2012	Arsys Software	December 8, 1989	
45	Zavaş	December 18, 2012	Popcom Soft	1988	
46	~~Ki Taihei 68K~~ (delisted)	February 5, 2013	SPS	1992	
47	~~Cyber Core~~ (delisted)	March 26, 2013	SPS	1991	
48	Joshua	June 11, 2013	Panther Software	1992	
49	Arcus Odyssey	July 30, 2013	Nihon Telenet	1991	
50	Mahjong Madness Special	August 20, 2013	Micronet	1988	
51	Super Daisenryaku 68K	November 26, 2013	System Soft	1988	
52	A Ressha de Ikō: A-Train II	January 14, 2014	Artdink	1988	
53	Laplace's Demon	April 8, 2014	HummingBirdSoft	1990	
54	Tanba	April 15, 2014	Micronet	1988	
55	Chōjin	September 23, 2014	Fix	1991	
56	Mid-Garts Gold 68K	November 11, 2014	Nihon Telenet	1989	
57	Amber Testament	December 9, 2014	Riverhillsoft	1988	
58	Ōgon no Rashinban Shō Yō Maru Kuwa kō Kōro Satsujin Jiken	June 16, 2015	Riverhillsoft	1990	
59	Warning Type 68	August 25, 2015	Cosmos Computer	December 12, 1988	
59	Warning Type 68	July 9, 2021	Cosmos Computer	December 12, 1988	
59	Warning Type 68	July 25, 2022	Cosmos Computer	December 12, 1988	
60	Imperial Force	May 24, 2016	System Soft	1991	
61	First Queen II: Sabaku no Joō	April 18, 2017	Kure Software Koubou	1990	
62	Olteus II	January 23, 2018	Winkysoft	1991	
62	Olteus II	February 2, 2021	Winkysoft	1991	
63	Sabnack	September 18, 2018	Kogado Studio	1991	
64	Keeper	December 20, 2022	Success	December 25, 1993	
65	Cotton: Fantastic Night Dreams	February 21, 2023	Success	September 24, 1993	
66	Record of Lodoss War: The Gray Witch	May 30, 2023	HummingBirdSoft	August 24, 1991	

== PC Engine ==
The PC Engine was a Japanese video game console released by NEC in 1987 - and PC Engine games started to be made available through Project EGG on October 29, 2003.

There have been 57 PC Engine titles available on Project EGG, 1 of which is no longer available for purchase:

No.	Title	Release date	Original rightsholder	Original release	Ref.
1	Cho Aniki (Note: Two versions were released at the same time: a version with 16-bit quality audio, subtitled "Full"; a version with lower 8-bit quality audio, subtitled "Tiny")	October 29, 2003	Masaya Games	1992	
2	Ai Cho Aniki	December 19, 2003	Masaya Games	1995	
3	Moto Roader	October 8, 2004	Masaya Games	1989	
4	The Legend of Xanadu	April 13, 2007	Nihon Falcom	1994	
5	The Legend of Xanadu II	May 11, 2007	Nihon Falcom	1995	
6	Valis: The Legend of a Fantasm Soldier	June 26, 2007	Nihon Telenet	1992	
7	Valis II	July 10, 2007	Nihon Telenet	1989	
8	Valis III	July 31, 2007	Nihon Telenet	1990	
9	Valis IV	August 21, 2007	Nihon Telenet	1991	
10	Fray CD	September 14, 2012	Micro Cabin	1994	
11	Final Zone II	November 6, 2012	Nihon Telenet	1990	
12	Mahjong Vanilla Syndrome	January 22, 2013	Nichibutsu	1991	
13	Xak III: The Eternal Recurrence	May 28, 2013	Micro Cabin	1993	
14	Kisou Louga	February 18, 2014	Kogado Studio	1993	
15	Detana!! TwinBee	March 3, 2014	Konami	February 28, 1992	
16	Gradius	March 3, 2014	Konami	November 15, 1991	
17	Salamander	March 3, 2014	Konami	March 12, 1991	
18	Super Schwarzschild	June 10, 2014	Kogado Studio	1991	
19	Avenger	July 15, 2014	Nihon Telenet	1990	
20	Super Schwarzschild 2	October 14, 2014	Kogado Studio	1992	
21	Cyber Citizen Shockman	November 18, 2014	Masaya Games	1989	
22	Mamono Hunter Yohko: Transfer Student from Makai	March 17, 2015	Masaya Games	1992	
23	Mamono Hunter Yohko: Distant Call	April 14, 2015	Masaya Games	1993	
24	Heavy Unit	October 20, 2015	Kaneko	1989	
25	Moto Roader MC	November 17, 2015	Masaya Games	1992	
26	Energy	December 15, 2015	Masaya Games	1989	
27	Exile: Into the Boundaries of Time	January 12, 2016	Nihon Telenet	1991	
28	Cyber Citizen Shockman 3: The Princess from Another World	February 16, 2016	Masaya Games	1992	
29	Double Dungeons	March 15, 2016	Masaya Games	1989	
30	Mysterious Masquerade	April 19, 2016	Masaya Games	1990	
31	Lord of Wars	May 17, 2016	System Soft	1991	
32	Moto Roader II	June 14, 2016	Masaya Games	1991	
33	Tenshi no Uta	June 21, 2016	Nihon Telenet	1991	
34	Mashō Denki La Valeur	July 19, 2016	Kogado Studio	1991	
35	Langrisser: The Descendants of Light	August 16, 2016	Masaya Games	1993	
36	Wallaby!! Usagi no Kuni no Kangaroo Race	August 23, 2016	Masaya Games	1990	
37	Crest of Gaia	September 13, 2016	Masaya Games	1988	
38	Rogue Combat Team: Bloody Wolf	October 11, 2016	Data East	1989	
39	Makai Hakkenden Shada	November 15, 2016	Data East	1989	
40	Tenshi no Uta II: Datenshi no Sentaku	December 13, 2016	Nihon Telenet	1993	
41	Silent Debuggers	January 10, 2017	Data East	1991	
42	Flying Trooper: χSERD	February 14, 2017	Masaya Games	1990	
43	Guyframe	March 14, 2017	Masaya Games	1990	
44	Winning Shot	April 11, 2017	Data East	1989	
45	Override	May 16, 2017	Data East	1991	
46	Dragon Egg!	June 20, 2017	Masaya Games	1991	
47	Cyber Citizen Shockman 2: A New Menace	July 18, 2017	Masaya Games	1991	
48	Drop Rock Hora Hora	August 22, 2017	Data East	1990	
49	Out Live	September 12, 2017	Sunsoft	1989	
50	Kisou Louga II: The Ends of Shangri-La	October 17, 2017	Kogado Studio	1995	
51	Benkei Gaiden	November 14, 2017	Sunsoft	1989	
52	Cosmic Fantasy: Bōken Shōnen Yū	July 24, 2018	Nihon Telenet	1990	
53	Cosmic Fantasy 2: Bouken Shounen Ban	August 28, 2018	Nihon Telenet	1991	
54	A Ressha de Ikō: A-Train III	January 21, 2020	Artdink	1993	
55	The Atlas	February 18, 2020	Artdink	1994	
56	Eikan wa Kimi ni: Kōkō Yakyū Zenkoku Taikai	March 24, 2020	Artdink	1994	
57	~~Pac-Land~~ (delisted on September 30, 2021)	November 20, 2020	Namco	1989	

== PC-8801mkIISR ==
The PC-8801mkIISR was a Japanese home computer released by NEC in 1985, as an upgraded version of their earlier PC-8801 platform - and PC8801mkIISR games started to be made available through Project EGG on September 7, 2004.

There have been 22 PC-8801mkIISR titles available on Project EGG, 2 of which are no longer available for purchase:

No.	Title	Release date	Original rightsholder	Original release	Ref.
1	Daiva Story 1: Flames of Vlitra	September 7, 2004	T&E Soft	February 1987	
1	Daiva Story 1: Flames of Vlitra	December 23, 2005	T&E Soft	February 1987	
1	Daiva Story 1: Flames of Vlitra	January 28, 2020	T&E Soft	February 1987	
1	Daiva Story 1: Flames of Vlitra	April 26, 2022	T&E Soft	February 1987	
2	Ys I: Ancient Ys Vanished	December 28, 2006	Nihon Falcom	June 21, 1987	
3	Psychic War: Cosmic Soldier 2	November 26, 2013 (Note: Updated version for compatibility with Windows 8, which was the latest version of Windows at this time.)	Kogado Studio	June 26, 1987	
4	Crimson	May 10, 2014	Xtalsoft	1987	
4	Crimson	November 1, 2022	Xtalsoft	1987	
5	Phantom Heart III	January 22, 2019	Xtalsoft	January 12, 1990	
6	Argo	April 22, 2019	Kure Software Koubou	December 1986	
7	Psy-O-Blade	May 21, 2019	T&E Soft	November 19, 1988	
7	Psy-O-Blade	March 24, 2022	T&E Soft	November 19, 1988	
7	Psy-O-Blade	January 9, 2024	T&E Soft	November 19, 1988	
8	Jehard	September 24, 2019	Xtalsoft	October 1987	
8	Jehard	October 24, 2022	Xtalsoft	October 1987	
9	Lyrane	October 8, 2019	Bullet-Proof Software	January 1987	
10	Thexder	November 21, 2019	Game Arts	April 1985	
11	American Success	December 3, 2019	Winkysoft	November 1988	
12	Fire Hawk: Thexder - The Second Contact	December 27, 2019	Game Arts	November 1989	
13	Providence	May 12, 2020	System Sacom	March 10, 1989	
13	Providence	October 24, 2022	System Sacom	March 10, 1989	
14	Future	November 17, 2020	Creative Brain	1986	
15	Combat Simulator: Battle Gorilla	November 23, 2021	Xtalsoft	April 27, 1988	
16	Warning	December 14, 2021	Cosmos Computer	December 1987	
17	Lost Power	February 1, 2022	Winkysoft	June 1986	
18	Babylon	April 26, 2022	Xtalsoft	December 1986	
18	Babylon	September 6, 2022	Xtalsoft	December 1986	
19	~~Chatty~~ (delisted)	May 24, 2022	System Sacom		
20	~~Rune Worth: Black Prince~~ (delisted)	May 24, 2022	T&E Soft		
21	Crimson III	December 13, 2022	Xtalsoft	May 11, 1990	
22	Advanced Fantasian: Quest for Lost Sanctuary	June 13, 2023	Xtalsoft	December 1990	

== Windows ==
Titles originally released for Microsoft Windows operating systems began being re-released on Project EGG on December 22, 2004. So far, all Windows titles on EGG are compilations of ported titles from older home computers and home video game consoles.

There are currently 2 Windows titles available on Project EGG:

No.	Title	Release date	Original rightsholder	Original release	Ref.
1	Hydlide 1•2•3	December 22, 2004	T&E Soft	2001	
2	Ys: Complete Works	February 23, 2007	Nihon Falcom	2003	

== Famicom ==
The Family Computer, or Famicom, was a Japanese video game console released by Nintendo in 1983. From 1985 onwards, Nintendo would bring an adapted version of the console to the West called the Nintendo Entertainment System, or NES for short. Later still - in 1986 - Nintendo would release a disk-based add-on peripheral for the Famicom called the Famicom Disk System.

Famicom games initially started to be made available through Project EGG on December 23, 2005. Famicom Disk System titles would then start being added to Project EGG on December 11, 2007. Finally, NES titles started being be added to Project EGG on October 12, 2021.

There have been 86 Famicom, Famicom Disk System and NES titles available on Project EGG, 6 of which are no longer available for purchase:

No.	Title	Release date	Original rightsholder	Original release	Ref.
1	Daiva Story 6: Imperial of Nirsartia	December 23, 2005	T&E Soft	1986	
1	Daiva Story 6: Imperial of Nirsartia	July 14, 2020	T&E Soft	1986	
1	Daiva Story 6: Imperial of Nirsartia	August 24, 2022	T&E Soft	1986	
2	Relics: Ankoku Yousai (Note: Famicom Disk System title)	December 11, 2007	Bothtec	1987	
2	Relics: Ankoku Yousai	February 2, 2010	Bothtec	1987	
3	Double Dragon	March 23, 2010	Technōs Japan	April 8, 1988	
4	Downtown Nekketsu March: Super-Awesome Field Day!	March 23, 2010	Technōs Japan	October 12, 1990	
5	Downtown Nekketsu Story	March 23, 2010	Technōs Japan	April 25, 1989	
6	Nekketsu Kōha Kunio-kun	March 23, 2010	Technōs Japan	May 1986	
7	Sugoro Quest: Dice Heroes	March 23, 2010	Technōs Japan	June 28, 1991	
8	Chô Wakusei Senki Metafight	March 30, 2010	Sunsoft	June 17, 1988	
9	Ikki	March 30, 2010	Sunsoft	November 28, 1985	
10	Shanghai	March 30, 2010	Sunsoft	December 4, 1987	
11	The Wing of Madoola	March 30, 2010	Sunsoft	December 18, 1986	
12	Tōkaidō Gojūsan-tsugi	March 30, 2010	Sunsoft	July 3, 1986	
13	Double Dragon II: The Revenge	April 13, 2010	Technōs Japan	December 22, 1989	
14	Nekketsu High School Dodgeball Club	April 13, 2010	Technōs Japan	July 26, 1988	
15	V'Ball	April 13, 2010	Technōs Japan	November 10, 1989	
16	Hebereke	April 20, 2010	Sunsoft	September 20, 1991	
17	Route-16 Turbo	April 20, 2010	Sunsoft	October 4, 1985	
18	Super Arabian	April 20, 2010	Sunsoft	July 25, 1985	
19	B-Wings	April 27, 2010	Data East	June 3, 1986	
20	~~Cobra Command~~ (delisted)	April 27, 2010	Data East	1988	
21	Dark Lord	April 27, 2010	Data East	February 8, 1991	
22	Atlantis no Nazo	May 11, 2010	Sunsoft	April 17, 1986	
23	Heavy Barrel	May 18, 2010	Data East	March 2, 1990	
24	Little Magic	May 18, 2010	Data East	September 14, 1990	
25	Exerion	May 25, 2010	Jaleco	1985	
26	Ninja JaJaMaru-kun	May 25, 2010	Jaleco	1985	
27	Gimmick!	June 8, 2010	Sunsoft	January 31, 1992	
28	Soccer League - Winner's Cup	June 15, 2010	Data East	1988	
29	Double Dragon III: The Rosetta Stone	July 6, 2010	Technōs Japan	February 22, 1991	
30	Field Combat	July 20, 2010	Jaleco	1985	
31	Formation Z	July 20, 2010	Jaleco	1985	
32	JaJaMaru no Daibouken	July 20, 2010	Jaleco	1986	
33	Golf Club: Birdie Rush	August 17, 2010	Data East	1987	
34	World Grand-Prix: Pole to Finish	August 17, 2010	Data East	1988	
35	Bio Senshi Dan: Increaser to no Tatakai	August 24, 2010	Jaleco	1987	
36	Esper Boukentai	August 24, 2010	Jaleco	1987	
37	Argus	September 21, 2010	Jaleco	1986	
38	City Connection	October 26, 2010	Jaleco	1985	
39	Daikaiju Deburasu	December 21, 2010	Data East	1990	
40	Buggy Popper	January 18, 2011	Data East	1986	
41	Magic John	February 8, 2011	Jaleco	1990	
42	Shogi Ryuo Battle	January 10, 2012	I'MAX	1991	
43	Daisenryaku	March 20, 2012	Bothtec	1988	
43	Daisenryaku	February 28, 2013	Bothtec	1988	
44	Ripple Island	June 26, 2012	Sunsoft	January 23, 1988	
45	Battle Formula	April 9, 2013	Sunsoft	1991	
46	Crazy Climber	September 16, 2014	Nichibutsu	1986	
47	Seicross	September 16, 2014	Nichibutsu	1986	
48	Terra Cresta	October 28, 2014	Nichibutsu	1986	
49	Booby Kids	January 13, 2015	Nichibutsu	1987	
50	MagMax	February 17, 2015	Nichibutsu	1986	
51	Cosmo Police Galivan	March 10, 2015	Nichibutsu	1988	
52	Family Quiz: 4-nin wa Rival	July 14, 2015	Athena	1988	
53	Sword Master	August 18, 2015	Athena	1990	
54	Zanac	September 1, 2015	Compile	November 28, 1986	
55	Topple Zip	October 27, 2015	Bothtec	1987	
55	Topple Zip	August 7, 2018	Bothtec	1987	
56	Championship Bowling	November 10, 2015	Athena	1991	
57	Family Block	March 22, 2016	Athena	1991	
58	Rough World	June 13, 2017	Sunsoft	1990	
59	~~Hiryū no Ken: Ougi no Sho~~ (delisted)	February 13, 2018	Culture Brain	1987	
60	~~Super Chinese~~ (delisted)	April 17, 2018	Culture Brain	1986	
61	De-Block	July 17, 2018	Athena	1991	
62	~~Hiryū no Ken II: Dragon no Tsubasa~~ (delisted)	September 11, 2018	Culture Brain	1988	
63	Wit's	January 15, 2019	Athena	1990	
64	Miracle Warriors: Seal of the Dark Lord	May 28, 2019	Kogado Studio	1987	
65	~~Chōjin Ultra Baseball~~ (delisted)	June 11, 2019	Culture Brain	1989	
66	Navy Blue	July 16, 2019	Use Corporation	1992	
67	Hyakki Yakou	August 20, 2019	Use Corporation	1989	
68	Meiji Ishin	September 17, 2019	Use Corporation	1989	
69	Hottaman no Chitei Tanken	October 15, 2019	Use Corporation	1986	
70	Double Moon Densetsu	November 12, 2019	Masaya Games	1992	
71	Ring King	December 10, 2019	Woodplace	1987	
72	Hydlide Special	May 19, 2020	T&E Soft	1986	
73	Dragon Unit	June 16, 2020	Athena	1990	
74	Karnov	September 15, 2020	Data East	1987	
75	Tōjin Makyō Den: Heracles no Eikō	October 20, 2020	Data East	1987	
76	Heracles no Eikou II: Titan no Metsubou	December 15, 2020	Data East	1989	
77	~~Battle City~~ (delisted on September 30, 2021)	January 26, 2021	Namco	1985	
78	Neo Heiankyo Alien	February 16, 2021	Columbus Circle	2017	
79	BurgerTime	March 16, 2021	Data East	1985	
80	8-bit Rhythm Land	May 18, 2021	Columbus Circle	2019	
81	Pipeline Daisakusen (Note: Originally released as Gorby no Pipeline Daisakusen. The Project EGG re-release changed the title, altered game content and censored the boxart to remove all references to former Soviet leader Mikhail Gorbachev)	June 15, 2021	Compile	1991	
81	Pipeline Daisakusen	June 24, 2022	Compile	1991	
82	Hydlide (overseas version) (Note: Nintendo Entertainment System title)	October 12, 2021	T&E Soft	1989	
83	Zanac (overseas version)	December 7, 2021	Compile	1987	
84	Gorby no Pipeline Daisakusen	April 11, 2023	Compile	April 12, 1991	
85	Puyo Puyo: Cartridge Version	April 16, 2024	Compile	July 23, 1993	
86	Puyo Puyo: Disk Version	June 11, 2024	Compile	October 25, 1991	

== PC-6001 ==
The PC-6001 was a Japanese home computer released by NEC in 1981 - and original PC-6001 games (as opposed to titles from later revisions of the platform) started to be made available through Project EGG on November 13, 2007.

There are currently 11 original PC-6001 titles available on Project EGG:

No.	Title	Release date	Original rightsholder	Original release	Ref.
1	AX-1: Demonstration	November 13, 2007	ASCII Corporation	1982	
2	AX-2: Dual Alien	November 13, 2007	ASCII Corporation	1982	
3	AX-3: Interfight	November 27, 2007	ASCII Corporation	1982	
4	AX-5: Orion	January 8, 2008	ASCII Corporation	1982	
5	AX-4: Black Hole	February 5, 2008	ASCII Corporation	1982	
6	AX-3: Slot Poker	March 11, 2008	ASCII Corporation	1982	
7	Eggy	December 1, 2020	Bothtec	1985	
8	Earthbound	November 9, 2021	Xtalsoft	1984	
9	Holy Sword	December 21, 2021	Xtalsoft	1983	
10	Trick Boy	June 14, 2022	T&E Soft	1984	
11	Wonder House	September 5, 2023	Task Force Kochi	1983	

== Arcade ==
Arcade titles would start being added to Project EGG on July 27, 2010.

There have been 12 arcade titles available on Project EGG, 2 of which are no longer available for purchase:

No.	Title	Release date	Original rightsholder	Original release	Ref.
1	Nekketsu Kōha Kunio-kun	July 27, 2010	Technōs Japan	1986	
2	Renegade	November 22, 2011	Technōs Japan	1986	
3	Ikki	August 15, 2017	Sunsoft	1985	
4	Karnov	March 27, 2020	Data East	1987	
5	Atomic Runner Chelnov	June 19, 2020	Data East	1988	
6	~~Xevious~~ (delisted on September 30, 2021)	October 9, 2020	Namco	1982	
7	~~Aero-Cross~~ (delisted on September 30, 2021)	December 18, 2020	Namco	1985	
8	Kuuga: Operation Code Vapor Trail	December 28, 2021	Data East	1989	
9	King of Boxer	February 22, 2022	Woodplace	1985	
10	The Alphax Z	April 19, 2022	Woodplace	1986	
11	Mission 660 (Note: The western localised version of The Alphax Z.)	August 30, 2022	Woodplace	1986	
12	FireTrap	October 25, 2022	Woodplace	1986	

== Super Famicom ==
The Super Famicom was a Japanese video game console released by Nintendo in 1990 - and Super Famicom games started to be made available through Project EGG on September 14, 2010.

There have been 60 Super Famicom titles available on Project EGG, 2 of which are no longer available for purchase:

No.	Title	Release date	Original rightsholder	Original release	Ref.
1	Albert Odyssey	September 14, 2010	Sunsoft	March 5, 1993	
2	Bishōjo Suzumeshi Sūchī Pai	October 12, 2010	Jaleco	1993	
3	Ys V: Kefin, Lost City of Sands	November 9, 2010	Nihon Falcom	December 29, 1995	
4	Super Mahjong	November 30, 2010	I'MAX	1992	
5	Super!! Pachinko	November 30, 2010	I'MAX	1994	
6	Shodai Nekketsu Kōha Kunio-kun	December 14, 2010	Technōs Japan	1992	
7	Super! Hanafuda	January 11, 2011	I'MAX	1994	
8	Return of Double Dragon	January 25, 2011	Technōs Japan	1992	
9	Ball Bullet Gun	February 15, 2011	I'MAX	1995	
10	Hebereke no Popoon	March 8, 2011	Sunsoft	1993	
11	Rushing Beat	March 22, 2011	Jaleco	1992	
12	Rushing Beat Ran	March 29, 2011	Jaleco	1992	
13	Dossun! Rock Battle	April 12, 2011	I'MAX	1994	
14	The Combatribes	May 17, 2011	Technōs Japan	1992	
15	Rushing Beat Syura	May 24, 2011	Jaleco	1993	
16	Super Birdie Rush	June 21, 2011	Data East	1992	
17	Fighter's History	July 19, 2011	Data East	1994	
18	Cosmo Police Galivan II: Arrow of Justice	August 30, 2011	Nichibutsu	1993	
19	Popoitto Hebereke	September 13, 2011	Sunsoft	1995	
20	Hashire Hebereke	October 11, 2011	Sunsoft	1994	
21	Popful Mail	November 8, 2011	Nihon Falcom	June 10, 1994	
22	Sugoi Hebereke	December 13, 2011	Sunsoft	1994	
23	~~Dual Orb II~~ (delisted)	December 20, 2011	I'MAX	1994	
24	Caveman Combat 2: The Adventures of Rookie	January 17, 2012	Data East	1992	
25	Super Hanafuda 2	February 14, 2012	I'MAX	1995	
26	Super Mahjong 2	March 27, 2012	I'MAX	1993	
27	Side Pocket	April 17, 2012	Data East	1994	
28	Psycho Dream	April 24, 2012	Nihon Telenet	1992	
29	Super Shogi 2	May 22, 2012	I'MAX	1994	
30	The Journey Home: Quest for the Throne	July 10, 2012	Nihon Telenet	1993	
31	Caveman Combat 3: The Protagonists are Joe & Mac Again	July 31, 2012	Data East	1993	
32	Super High School Baseball: One Pitch Soul	August 7, 2012	I'MAX	1996	
33	The Fortress of Fury	October 30, 2012	Jaleco	1993	
34	Xak: The Art of Visual Stage	February 19, 2013	Sunsoft	1993	
35	Crash Bullet Car Decisive Battle: Battle Mobile	May 21, 2013	System Sacom	1993	
36	Super Mahjong 3 Karakuchi	July 23, 2013	I'MAX	1994	
37	Assault Suits Valken	November 18, 2014	Masaya Games	1992	
38	Cho Aniki: Bakuretsu Ranto-hen	December 16, 2014	Masaya Games	1995	
39	Der Langrisser	December 16, 2014	Masaya Games	1995	
40	Power Athlete	February 10, 2015	Kaneko	1991	
41	Strike Gunner S.T.G	July 14, 2015	Athena	1992	
42	Motteke Oh! Dorobou	September 15, 2015	Data East	1995	
43	Kaite Tsukutte Asoberu: Dezaemon	January 12, 2016	Athena	1994	
44	Super Bowling	April 26, 2016	Athena	1992	
45	Super Bike Racing	August 9, 2016	I'MAX	1995	
46	BioMetal	November 22, 2016	Athena	1993	
47	Professional Mahjong Kiwame	December 20, 2016	Athena	1993	
48	Clock Tower	May 23, 2017	Sunsoft	1995	
49	~~Super Ultra Baseball~~ (delisted)	March 27, 2018	Culture Brain	1991	
50	Super Valis: Red Moon Rising Maiden	June 19, 2018	Nihon Telenet	1992	
51	Professional Mahjong Kiwame II	October 9, 2018	Athena	1994	
52	Tenshi no Uta: Shiroki Tsubasa no Inori	December 18, 2018	Nihon Telenet	1994	
53	Heracles no Eikō III: Kamigami no Chinmoku	May 25, 2021	Data East	1992	
54	New 3D Golf Simulation: Devil's Course	May 10, 2022	T&E Soft	1993	
55	Cu-On-Pa	September 13, 2022	T&E Soft	December 20, 1996	
56	Record of Lodoss War	December 27, 2022	Kadokawa	December 22, 1995	
57	Gōsō Jinrai Densetsu Musha	January 24, 2023	Datam Polystar	April 21, 1992	
58	Sword World SFC	January 31, 2023	T&E Soft	August 6, 1993	
59	Sword World SFC 2: Inishie no Kyojin Densetsu	February 28, 2023	T&E Soft	July 15, 1994	
60	Madō Monogatari Hanamaru Dai Youchienji	March 19, 2024	Compile	January 12, 1996	

== Neo Geo ==
Neo Geo was a family of Japanese video game hardware initially released by SNK in 1990 - and Neo Geo games started to be made available through Project EGG on April 19, 2011.

There were 20 Neo Geo titles available on Project EGG. The entire Neo Geo selection has since been delisted.

No.	Title	Release date	Original rightsholder	Original release	Ref.
1	Garō Densetsu: Shukumei no Tatakai	April 19, 2011	SNK	1991	
1	Garō Densetsu: Shukumei no Tatakai	July 27, 2012 (Note: Special lower price version for the "Neo-Geo Thank You" special event. Delisted after 39 days on September 3, 2012.)	SNK	1991	
2	Super Iron Brikinger	April 19, 2011	SNK	1996	
2	Super Iron Brikinger	July 27, 2012	SNK	1996	
3	The King of Fighters '94	April 19, 2011	SNK	1994	
3	The King of Fighters '94	July 27, 2012	SNK	1994	
4	Shock Troopers	April 26, 2011	SNK	1997	
4	Shock Troopers	July 27, 2012	SNK	1997	
5	Magical Drop II	June 1, 2011	Data East	1996	
5	Magical Drop II	July 27, 2012	Data East	1996	
6	NAM-1975	June 1, 2011	SNK	1990	
6	NAM-1975	July 27, 2012	SNK	1990	
7	Shinohken	June 1, 2011	SNK	1996	
7	Shinohken	July 27, 2012	SNK	1996	
8	Stakes Winner	June 1, 2011	SNK	1996	
8	Stakes Winner	July 27, 2012	SNK	1996	
9	Dunk Dream	June 28, 2011	Data East	1994	
9	Dunk Dream	July 27, 2012	Data East	1994	
10	Metal Slug	June 28, 2011	SNK	1996	
10	Metal Slug	July 27, 2012	SNK	1996	
11	Pulstar	June 28, 2011	SNK	1995	
11	Pulstar	July 27, 2012	SNK	1995	
12	World Heroes	June 28, 2011	SNK	1992	
12	World Heroes	July 27, 2012	SNK	1992	
13	Fighter's History Dynamite	July 26, 2011	Data East	1994	
13	Fighter's History Dynamite	July 27, 2012	Data East	1994	
14	Miracle Adventure	August 24, 2011	Data East	1993	
14	Miracle Adventure	July 27, 2012	Data East	1993	
15	Magical Drop III	September 27, 2011	Data East	1997	
15	Magical Drop III	July 27, 2012	Data East	1997	
16	Ironclad (Note: The western localised version of Super Iron Brikinger.)	July 31, 2012	SNK		
17	Waku Waku 7	August 7, 2012	Sunsoft	1996	
17	Waku Waku 7	September 4, 2012	Sunsoft	1996	
18	Galaxy Fight: Universal Warriors	August 21, 2012	Sunsoft	1995	
18	Galaxy Fight: Universal Warriors	September 4, 2012	Sunsoft	1995	
19	Fatal Fury: King of Fighters	October 16, 2012	SNK	1991	
20	Metal Slug (English version)	April 23, 2013	SNK	1996	

== SG-1000 ==
The SG-1000 was a Japanese video game console released by Sega in 1983 - and SG-1000 games started to be made available through Project EGG on December 11, 2012.

There was 1 SG-1000 title available on Project EGG, which has since been delisted.

No.	Title	Release date	Original rightsholder	Original release	Ref.
1	Hustle! Chumy	December 11, 2012	Compile	1984	

== PC-6601 ==
The PC-6601 was a Japanese home computer released by NEC in 1985 - and PC-6601 games started to be made available through Project EGG on March 9, 2021.

There are currently 2 PC-6601 titles available on Project EGG:

No.	Title	Release date	Original rightsholder	Original release	Ref.
1	3D Golf Simulation Super Version	March 9, 2021	T&E Soft	1985	
1	3D Golf Simulation Super Version	October 24, 2022	T&E Soft	1985	
2	Hydlide	June 22, 2021	T&E Soft	1985	
2	Hydlide	October 24, 2022	T&E Soft	1985	

== Sega Mark III ==
The Sega Mark III was a Japanese video game console released by Sega in 1985, as an updated version of their earlier SG-1000 console - and Mark III games started to be made available through Project EGG on October 4, 2021.

There are currently 2 Sega Mark III titles available on Project EGG:

No.	Title	Release date	Original rightsholder	Original release	Ref.
1	Miracle Warriors: Seal of the Dark Lord	October 4, 2021	Kogado Studio	October 18, 1987	
2	Maou Golvellius	October 4, 2021	Compile	1986	

== Game Gear ==
The Game Gear was a Japanese handheld game console released by Sega in 1990 - and Game Gear games started to be made available through Project EGG on November 14, 2023.

There are currently 4 Game Gear titles available on Project EGG.

No.	Title	Release date	Original rightsholder	Original release	Ref.
1	Madō Monogatari I: The Three Magic Spheres	November 14, 2023	Compile	December 3, 1993	
2	Madō Monogatari II: 16-year-old Arle	December 12, 2023	Compile	May 20, 1994	
3	Madō Monogatari III: The Ultimate Queen	January 23, 2024	Compile	November 30, 1994	
4	Madō Monogatari A: Heart-pounding Vacation	February 20, 2024	Compile	November 24, 1995	

== See also ==
- List of PicoPico games
- List of EGGY games
- Lists of Virtual Console games
- List of Nintendo Classics games
- List of Arcade Archives games
- List of G-Mode Archives games
