= The Tower of Cabin =

1992 video game

- Developer(s): Microcabin
- Publisher(s): Microcabin
- Platform(s): MSX2, PC-98
- Release: 1992
- Genre(s): Adventure Game
- Mode(s): Single player

The Tower of Cabin is an unusual spinoff of the fantasy role-playing video game series called Xak by the Japanese developer Microcabin. The Tower of Cabin was released just before Microcabin decided to discontinue the development of Xak III for MSX. The Tower of Cabin was also ported to the PC-98. In this game, the player plays as a new Microcabin employee as they wander the Microcabin headquarters building in Japan with a goal to work with the various lead programmers and developers in making the company more successful. This is very similar to the later Japanese game known as Segagaga (Dreamcast) in which the player runs the entire Sega company as the president of Sega Corporation. This game featured many characters from the Xak series such as Latok, Fray and Pixie. There were two unlockable mini-games in The Tower of Cabin: a short fighting game between Pixie and Fray and a text adventure called Crusader that took place within the Xak universe.

== Setting and story ==
The game's setting takes place at the Microcabin office building in Japan. The player descends and ascends to various floors throughout the building while carrying out various business related tasks.

== Characters ==
Besides the main character, the player, there are several miscellaneous NPC's that the player can talk with in order to proceed through the game. In addition there are a few characters from other Microcabin games that make a cameo appearance:

- Fray, the blue-haired sorceress of the Xak series and Fray in Magical Adventure makes a cameo appearance.
- Pixie, the green-haired faerie of the Xak series makes a cameo appearance.
- Latok, the main hero of the Xak series makes a cameo appearance.

== Gameplay ==
Most of the game is played by traveling the office building to various departments and relaying information between the employees and completing various business related tasks in order to ensure the success of the Microcabin company.
