= Fire Hawk: Thexder - The Second Contact =

1989 video game

- Developer: Game Arts
- Publishers: Game Arts; Sierra On-Line (DOS)
- Directors: Satoshi Uesaka; Ari Kamijō; Kazuyuki Ohata
- Producer: Mitsuhiro Mazda
- Designers: Ari Kamijō; Osamu Harada
- Programmers: Ari Kamijō; Kazuyuki Ohata
- Artists: Masatoshi Azumi; Masahiko Ikeya; Tsuyoshi Tanaka
- Writer: Satoshi Uesaka
- Composers: Hiromi Ohba; Tadashi Shimayama; Masahiko Yoshimura
- Platforms: MSX2, MS-DOS, PC-8801
- Release: JP: 1989; NA: October 1990
- Genre: Run and gun
- Mode: Single-player

Fire Hawk: Thexder - The Second Contact (テグザー2 ファイアーホーク), also known as Firehawk: Thexder 2, Firehawk or Thexder II, is a video game developed and published by Game Arts for the MSX2, MS-DOS and PC-8801 in 1989 as a sequel to Thexder only in Japan. The MS-DOS version was later released by Sierra On-Line.

== Reception ==
The One predicted that "with furious arcade action, high-resolution graphics and 11 complete songs (...) Thexder II looks set to surpass the success of the original." The game was indeed well-received upon release and sold well both in Japan and in the USA.
