= Gyrodine =

1984 video game

- Famicom cover art
- Developer: Crux
- Publisher: Taito
- Platforms: Arcade, Famicom, MSX, PC-8801
- Release: Arcade: JP: 1984; Famicom: JP: March 13, 1986
- Genre: Scrolling shooter
- Mode: Single-player

Gyrodine (ジャイロダイン, Jairodain) is a top-down, vertically scrolling shooter developed by Crux and released in arcades by Taito in 1984. Conversions for the Famicom and MSX followed. The player flies a helicopter that can shoot air and ground targets.

== Reception ==
In Japan, Game Machine listed Gyrodine as the ninth most successful table arcade unit of July 1984.
