= Zan: Yasha Enbukyoku =

1990 video game

- Cover art of the Mega Drive version
- Developer: Wolf Team
- Publisher: Wolf Team
- Director: Kiyoharo Goto
- Producer: Masahiro Akishino
- Designer: Shunji Sekizuka
- Composer: Motoi Sakuraba
- Platforms: NEC PC-8801, NEC PC-9801, Sega Mega Drive
- Release: PC-88: JP: September 4, 1990; Sega Mega Drive: JP: March 29, 1991
- Genre: Strategy
- Mode: Single-player

Zan: Yasha Enbukyoku (斬 夜叉円舞曲) is a 1990 strategy video game by Wolf Team. Set in Feudal Japan, it follows yaksha warriors fighting against demons. Units must be deployed for both protection and attack.
