= Vixen 357 =

1992 video game

- Original Japanese Mega Drive cover art
- Developer: NCS Corporation
- Publishers: Masaya; Ratalaika Games; Shinyuden
- Producer: Toshiro Tsuchida
- Platforms: Mega Drive, Nintendo Switch, Xbox Series, Playstation 5, Steam
- Release: JP: 23 October 1992; WW: 23 October 2026
- Genre: Tactical role-playing
- Mode: Single-player

Vixen 357 (Note: Japanese: ヴィクセン ３５７, Hepburn: Vu~ikusen 357) is a war video game developed by NCS Corporation and published by Masaya Games, and released in 1992 for the Mega Drive. An English-translated production run was scheduled for a 2019 release by Super Fighter Team, but was ultimately cancelled. In 2026 Shinyuden released an English and Spanish translation of the game on Steam and a physical cartridge production run. Ratalaika Games published the game on Xbox Series, Playstation 5 and Nintendo Switch.

Taking place in the late 25th century, many of the characters provided to the player provide character development and losing them could mean losing the game, resulting in a game over. The game uses a battery save to help players regain lost characters in case one of them die in a tactical mistake.

Anime-style cinemas help improve the plot as the story develops.

Vixen 357 is set in the same world as Hisou Kihei X-SERD, a 1990 PC Engine release. Both titles were produced by Toshiro Tsuchida, who after leaving Masaya went to Square Enix and created the Front Mission series.
