= Mission 660 =

1986 video game

- Developer: Woodplace
- Publisher: Taito
- Platform: Arcade
- Release: October 1986
- Genre: Scrolling shooter
- Modes: Single-player, multiplayer

Mission 660 (released as The Alphax Z in Japan) is a vertically scrolling shooter arcade video game released in 1986. It was developed by Woodplace and licensed for distribution to Taito. Enemies resembling space fighters are interspersed with flying mice, cats and skulls, giving the game an unusual feel.
