= Xak III: The Eternal Recurrence =

1993 video game

- Developer(s): Microcabin
- Publisher(s): Microcabin; NEC (PC Engine CD)
- Platform(s): PC-98, FM Towns, PC Engine CD
- Release: JP: April 23, 1993 (NEC PC-9801); JP: September 1993 (FM Towns); JP: September 30, 1994 (PC Engine CD)
- Genre(s): Action role-playing game
- Mode(s): Single-player

Xak III: The Eternal Recurrence is the final game in a fantasy role-playing video game series called Xak developed and published by the Japanese software developers Microcabin and NEC. Xak III was originally under development to be released for the MSX2 but shortly after Xak: The Tower of Gazzel was released, the development project was halted. After several years the project was continued and finally released simultaneously for the PC-98 and FM Towns. A year later, Xak III was released for the PC Engine CD; this version has since been unofficially translated into English.

== Setting and story ==
Xak features a typical high fantasy setting. According to the game world's legends, a great war was fought between the benevolent but weakening ancient gods and a demon race, which led to the collapse and eventual mortality of the gods. After this 'War of Sealing', the gods divided the world into three parts: Xak, the world of humans, Oceanity, the world of faeries, and Xexis, the world of demons. The demon world of Xexis was tightly sealed from the other two worlds as to prevent reentry of the warmongering demon race. Some demons were left behind in Xak, however, and others managed to discover a separate means to enter Xak from Xexis anyway.

At this point in the series the main hero, Latok Kart, has become a powerful adversary against the demons and their plots to conquer the world of Xak as he has triumphed over many powerful demons, including Zemu Badu, Zamu Gospel, Zegraya and Gazzel. Latok is a direct descendant of an ancient god of war, Duel, and his deeds have since become well known throughout the world of Xak as the legendary "Duel Knight", armed with a powerful relic known as the "Xak Sword". During this time a short-lived peace has been disrupted by the sudden attack of the nearby Kingdom of Farland led by a demon named Zomu Dizae. Latok learns of this and sets out for the Kingdom of Farland.

== Characters ==
Latok is the only playable character in the game. Notable non-player characters Latok meets include:

- Lou Miri Pixie, the green-haired messenger faerie sent by the King of Wavis that guides Latok along his way.
- Freya "Fray" Jerbain, a blue-haired sorceress who is the main heroine of a Xak series spin-off, Fray in Magical Adventure and its remake Fray CD.
- Rune Greed, a green-haired warrior who is a descendant of Duel as well and is on a quest to slay the demons all on his own.
- Duel, the god of war, living on in spirit form.
- Rabbie, a magician's familiar rabbit given to Latok.
- Elise, a childhood friend of Latok and the granddaughter of Fairless's mayor. She could be considered as a possible romantic interest of Latok.
- Saria, Latok's Mother, who is blind. Latok has taken care of her ever since his father disappeared.
- Dork, Latoks's Father and a famous swordsman who has been missing for many years. Dork Kart is also a descendant of Duel.
- Bobby, the pacifist son of the blacksmith Dac of the town of Fairless.
- Fell Bow, a nun and the sister of Wavis general Nill Bow whose family's duty is to protect the White Xak Dipole and guide the descendants of Duel in their quest.
- King Arband Wavis, the current king of the Holy Kingdom of Wavis and the one who originally sent Pixie to the Kart family in the first Xak.
- Beluga, the general of the Holy Kingdom of Wavis army.
- Zamhan, an officer of the Farland Imperial Guard.
- Gahoo, a hermit living atop a tower on Mt. Ginganul who has the power to control golems.
- Pumpkinhead, a golem under the service of Gafuh who assists Latok and his party in battle.
- Leo, the admiral of the sky ship S.S. Excavation who assists Latok and his party in battle.
- Horn Ashtar, a bard that is traveling with Fell Bow that has helped Latok and Rune in previous adventures.
- Nezo Gineas, a flying demon under the command of Zomu Dizae.
- Zau Melz, a high-ranking officer within the demon army with lizard-like features under the command of Zomu Dizae.
- The Necromancer, a powerful black-robed demon with power over the dead who is a recurring villain in the series. Latok had killed him during the events of Xak II, but he has risen again.
- Oon Ranouz, a demon with aquatic attributes under the command of Zomu Dizae.
- Zaki Ranouz, the brother of Oon Ranouz also with aquatic attributes under the command of Zomu Dizae.
- Sunaga, a creature with white leopard-like features that is a part of Yaksha Knight's Storm Mercenaries group.
- Yunker, a creature with lizard-like features that is a part of Yaksha Knight's Storm Mercenaries group.
- Aldis, a female mage under the service of Yaksha Knight's Storm Mercenaries group.
- Yaksha Knight, a mysterious leader of a group known as the Storm Mercenaries. Also known under names such as "Lucifer Knight" or "Ghoul Knight".
- Zomu Dizae, the last of three powerful commanders of the demon army (Zemu Badu and Zamu Gospel were the other two) who took leadership after the fall of the original Demonlord Xexis.

== Gameplay ==
Xak III is a classic dungeon crawl, in that the game proceeds by the player finding his way through labyrinthine maps, defeating opposing monsters on the way. In each map, keys, NPCs and other objects have to be found to gain entrance to the room where a boss dwells. After defeating the boss, the player can proceed towards the next map, where the structure repeats. Various sub-quests involving NPCs are present, most of them obligatory.

Combat is in real-time. The player's character walks around on the game maps, as well as the monster characters. Each character has an attack and defense rating, different for each of its four sides. Moreover, Latok's ratings change depending on whether he is attacking or defending. As Latok or a monster takes damage or wards off an attack, the character is pushed backwards. This combat system requires some manual dexterity, especially during boss fights—bosses are generally several times larger than Latok himself.

Latok advances in power through a classic leveling system. He starts from experience level 50, where Xak II (and The Tower of Gazzel) ended. Moreover, there are several shops scattered through the game where Latok can buy stronger swords, armours and shields. Gold, the game's currency, and experience points are awarded for killing monsters that wander the map.
