= Illusion City =

1991 video game

- MSX Turbo R cover art by Yukio Kitta
- Developer: Microcabin (Note: Sega Mega-CD version developed by Aisystem Tokyo.)
- Publisher: Microcabin (Note: FM Towns and X68000 versions published by Takeru.)
- Director: Yasuhiko Nakatsu
- Designer: Yasuhiko Nakatsu
- Programmers: Katsumi Ito; Yasuhiko Nakatsu
- Artists: Kouji Nakakita; Yasuhiro Jinnai; Yukio Kitta
- Writer: Masashi Katō
- Composers: Tadahiro Nitta; Yasufumi Fukuda; Yukiharu Urita
- Platforms: MSX Turbo R, PC-88, PC-98, FM Towns, X68000, Mega-CD
- Release: December 14, 1991: MSX Turbo R; JP: December 14, 1991 PC-88, PC-98; JP: January 18, 1992 FM Towns; JP: March 1993 X68000; JP: May 1993 Mega-CD; JP: May 28, 1993
- Genre: Role-playing
- Mode: Single-player

Illusion City (Note: Japanese: 幻影都市(イリュージョンシティ), Hepburn: Genei Toshi) is a 1991 role-playing video game originally developed and published by Microcabin for the MSX Turbo R home computer, followed by ports for the PC-88, PC-98, FM Towns, X68000, and Mega-CD. The story takes place in the 21st century after Hong Kong was devastated by a demonic attack, before the crisis was isolated and the region was reformed under new order by SIVA corporation. The game follows demon hunter Tian Ren, gathering information in order to unravel the mystery surrounding the demonic beings and SIVA corporation. Gameplay features a growing party led by Tian Ren navigating the city, talking with non-playable characters, exploring complex areas, and taking part in turn-based battles against enemies.

Illusion City was developed by "Project I", a group within Microcabin which previously worked on Fray in Magical Adventure (1990) under the name "Team Piku Piku". Yasuhiko Nakatsu acted as director, planner, and co-programmer. His motivation for creating the game was because he wanted to bring more world variety into the role-playing genre. The character design concepts were created by Kouji Nakakita under the pseudonym "Hyakkimaru", with Yukio Kitta acting as art illustrator. Masashi Katō, who worked on Xak II: Rising of the Redmoon, served as scenario writer. The music was composed by Tadahiro Nitta, Yasufumi Fukuda, and Yukiharu Urita.

Illusion City proved popular among Japanese players and garnered favorable reception from critics, but the Mega-CD version received mixed response and sold over 2,164 copies in its first week on the market. Retrospective commentary has been more positive.

== Gameplay ==

Top: Tian Ren exploring the map.
Bottom: A battle taking place.
(MSX Turbo R version showcased)

Illusion City is a Japanese role-playing game. The player controls the main character Tian Ren, a demon hunter gathering information in order to unravel the mystery surrounding the demonic beings and SIVA corporation. It features a growing party led by Tian Ren navigating the city, talking with non-playable characters, exploring complex areas, and taking part in turn-based battles against enemies.

== Synopsis ==
=== Setting and characters ===
The story takes place in the 21st century after Hong Kong was devastated by a demonic attack, before the crisis was isolated and the region was reformed under new order by SIVA corporation.

== Development ==
Illusion City was developed by "Project I", a group within Microcabin (known for the Xak series) which previously worked on Fray in Magical Adventure under the name "Team Piku Piku". Yasuhiko Nakatsu (who worked on Fray) acted as director, planner, and co-programmer with Katsumi Ito. The character design concepts were created by Kouji Nakakita under the pseudonym "Hyakkimaru", while Yukio Kitta served as art illustrator and Yasuhiro Jinnai was responsible for the monster designs. Nakakita and Jinnai also contributed as a co-graphic artists alongside Fumihide Aoki, map designer Hitoshi Suenaga (who also worked on Fray), Kenzo Furuya, Yasuaki Kubo, and Yoichiro Kawaguchi. Masashi Katō, who worked on Xak II: Rising of the Redmoon, is credited as scenario writer. Other staff members assisted in the production such as Etsuko Taniguchi and Rika Niimi.

Nakatsu revealed that the motivation for creating Illusion City was because he wanted to bring more world variety into the role-playing genre. Nakatsu explained the game became exclusive to MSX Turbo R was because it required between 3-4 times the amount of memory for processing speed compared to the Xak series. He also elaborated that porting the game as is to MSX2/MSX2+ machines was impossible from both memory and speed standpoints. Nakatsu commented that the most difficult aspect during development for him was synchronizing animation processing and command selection. Nakatsu also stated the reason for the "beautiful" characters was due to many of the staff being shōjo manga readers.

The music was composed by former Microcabin collaborators Tadahiro Nitta, Yasufumi Fukuda, and Yukiharu Urita. Nitta composed the music using a proprietary sound driver called "Yumirin", which was used in previous Microcabin releases including Fray. Nitta stated that the music was composed and programmed as an independent part of the composition stage. Nataksu expressed regret not being able to use PCM sound due to memory constrains.

== Release ==
Illusion City was first published for the MSX Turbo R on December 14, 1991, by Microcabin (although some sources list November 1991). It was followed by conversions for the PC-88 and PC-98 computers on January 18, 1992. The PC-98 version was co-programmed by Akira Misoda, Katsumi Ito, Koji Yamada, and Shojiro Aoki. That same year, an album containing the game's original soundtrack titled All Sounds of Illusion City was distributed in Japan by Datam Polystar on April 25. It was also ported to FM Towns, X68000, and Sega Mega-CD in 1993. Both the FM Towns and X68000 versions were distributed by Takeru physically and through Takeru-branded software vending machines, which allowed users to download games by inserting a blank floppy disk. The Mega-CD version was developed by Aisystem Tokyo, a Japanese game developer which had previously worked on other conversions for Mega-CD such as The Ninja Warriors (1987) and Night Striker (1989), featuring additional music tracks composed and arranged by Hirokazu Ōta. Neither version was officially released outside Japan, although an unfinished English fan translation by Adriano Cunha of A&L Software for the MSX Turbo R version exists. Between 2009 and 2017, the PC-98 version was re-released in digital form for Microsoft Windows through D4 Enterprise's Project EGG service. In 2025, a complete English fan translation for the MSX Turbo R version was released by the group MSX Translations.

== Reception ==
Reception

Review scores
Publication	Score
Beep! MegaDrive	(Mega-CD) 5.72/10 (Note: Average of four scores: 7/10, 4/10, 4/10, and 6/10.)
Famitsu	(Mega-CD) 26/40 (Note: Average of four scores: 6/10, 7/10, 6/10, and 7/10.)
Dengeki Mega Drive	(Mega-CD) 49% (Note: Average of four scores: 58%, 55%, 42%, and 40%.)
Hippon Super!	(Mega-CD) 3/10

Illusion City garnered favorable reception from critics, but the Sega Mega-CD version received mixed response. The Japanese publication Micom BASIC Magazine ranked the game at the number three spot in popularity on their April 1992 issue. Public reception towards the Mega-CD release was more positive; readers of Mega Drive Fan and the Japanese Sega Saturn Magazine voted to give it scores of 22.9 out of 30 and 8.093 out of 10 respectively, ranking among Mega Drive and Mega-CD games at the number 98 spot in a 1995 poll by Sega Saturn Magazine. According to Famitsu, the Mega-CD port sold over 2,164 copies in its first week on the market.

The Japanese MSX Magazine reviewed the original MSX Turbo R version, being impressed with the game's visuals and stating they have never seen a role-playing game of such a large scale on MSX. A writer for MSX Computer Magazine also reviewed the MSX Turbo R release, drawing comparison with SD Snatcher (1990) due to its cyberpunk atmosphere. They praised the game's stereo music, fluid graphical animations for taking advantage of the MSX Turbo R hardware, and overall quality, proclaiming that "Illusion City is big, extensive and above all very beautiful". Reviewing the Mega-CD version, Beep! Mega Drive magazine compared it unfavorably with Snatcher (1988). They found it dated and unpolished due to its inherent nature as a PC game, criticizing the scenario as well as the "unfriendly" battle and event sequences, but commended its engrossing setting.

Dengeki Mega Drive's four reviewers also reviewed the Mega-CD port, expressing that the game did not translate well from PC to console, finding its story good but sluggish and faulted the jerky screen scrolling. They also felt that it played more like an adventure game than an RPG. Famitsu's four editors reviewed the Mega-CD conversion as well, expressing that the game was directed like a movie. They gave positive remarks to the game's visuals, character animations, scenario, and futuristic Hong Kong-esque setting, but they felt the role-playing elements were weak. Oh!X's Zenji Nishikawa gave the X68000 version positive remarks for its setting, graphics, and audio, but noted that the game's speed and text was slower than the PC-98 version.

=== Retrospective coverage ===
Retrospective commentary for Illusion City has been more positive. An editor for the Japanese gaming book Mega Drive Encyclopedia recommended the Sega Mega-CD version for players tired of modern role-playing games, highlighting the muddy and interesting relationships of characters and enemies with the main protagonist. David Borrachero of Spanish gaming magazine RetroManiac called it the best RPG created by the creators of the Xak series, but criticized the abrupt character movement in the FM Towns version. MeriStation's Francisco Alberto Serrano labelled the original MSX Turbo R version as "a true masterpiece", lauding its atmosphere, soundtrack, and futuristic visual work. In a retrospective analysis of the PC-98 version, a writer for Dengeki Online praised the game's detailed pixel art, unique atmosphere, intertwining storyline, characters, and battle system.
