= Treasure of the Rudras =

1996 video game

Rudra no Hihou
- Developer: Square
- Publisher: Square
- Director: Kouji Ide
- Artist: Keita Amemiya
- Writers: Kouji Ide; Katsuyoshi Kawahara; Hideshi Kyounen
- Composer: Ryuji Sasai
- Platform: Super Famicom
- Release: JP: April 5, 1996
- Genre: Role-playing
- Mode: Single-player

Treasure of the Rudras (ルドラの秘宝, Rudora no Hihou; "Treasure of Rudra") is a Japanese role-playing game released by Square in 1996, and the company's last developed game for the Super Famicom.

The plot incorporates elements from Indian religions, centrally the concept of the wheel of time - every 4000 years the world is destroyed and recreated by a Rudra - the name taken from an aspect of the Hindu god of destruction, Shiva. With several races of beings already eradicated and replaced, the story takes place during the final 15 days before humans are scheduled to be wiped out as well; this forces the four main characters who were chosen by fate - Sion, Surlent, Riza, and Dune - to go on a quest to avert the scenario whilst uncovering the source of it all.

While the gameplay alludes to many Square games like Final Fantasy and so on, one notable deviation from the games is that of custom magic system (aka mantra system), in which players can freely create their own spells either by using both prefixes and suffixes contained within the game or just by trial and error. This negates the need of leveling up characters to learn spells automatically rather than manually, but despite its creativity, the overall usefulness contained within each imputed spell varies.

== Gameplay ==
Riza using a Dark mantra against a Future

The gameplay is divided into three main areas: the overworld map, the towns and dungeons, and battles. When in the overworld map, the player directs their characters to different locations in the game. Towns contain the prerequisite shops and villagers who offer information, while dungeons are mazelike affairs where random enemy encounters may occur. These battles may also strike on the overworld map and follow a typical RPG pattern: the player makes choices for their characters (such as whether to fight, cast a magic spell, or run away), and then the enemy takes a turn. This pattern repeats until the characters on one side all run out of hit points and die. There are 15 turns, accounting for each of the 15 days.

=== Magic system ===
The game features a magic system where the player can create magic spells by entering words up to six katakana characters. Whereas most console RPGs give the player access to a limited number of precreated spells, it allows the player nearly total creative freedom. The player can enter various magic words (called kotodama (言霊,ことだま) in the original) into their grimoire. Every one will have some effect, although most are not useful. There is an underlying framework to the system, however, which is based on the gameworld's elements.

A complete mantra generally consists of a prefix, elemental core, and suffix, although the core alone is enough to produce an effect. There are eight elements (plus healing), and of these, six are arranged in mutually antagonistic pairings: fire vs. water, wind vs. electricity, and light vs dark. The remaining two offensive elements, earth and void, have no strengths or weaknesses. Since spells are formed from letters, there are specific patterns corresponding to each element. Certain spells that use the root word tou for example, will produce lightning-based attacks, while those containing aqu will create water-based effects.

Additionally, there are prefixes and suffixes that can be added onto the base elements to change their attributes. Most of these influence the base power and cost to use the spell, but others add abnormal status effects (for example, poisoning the target) or change the mantra's range so that it only targets a single enemy instead of multiple ones or vice versa. Prefixes and suffixes with similar effects can be used in tandem to produce amplified effects.

Other mantras consist of unique words, many of them in English, that create certain effects and skip the naming system entirely. Many of these strange words are learned from in-game characters or by reading books. For example, geo is an earth-related mantra, and kingcoast is a water spell. Adding prefixes or suffixes to these usually makes something completely different (and often useless). This use of spelled-out mantras allows the player to learn magic from even their enemies. When an enemy uses magic, the player has but to write down the spells used and then to enter them into their own grimoire after the battle in order to have access to them. Some of these enemy spells are extremely powerful, although many are not as cost-efficient as the basic spells described above. Some are more space-efficient versions of regular spells.

== Plot ==
=== Setting and characters ===
The story is divided into three major scenarios, each with a different main character: the soldier Sion, the priestess Riza, and the archaeologist Surlent. As the player enters new areas and accomplishes different tasks, the human race's final 15 days slowly ebb away in a predetermined day/night cycle. The player is free to play the scenarios in any order, and may even leave one storyline to follow that of another character for a time. The actions of the characters in one location and time may have an effect on the others, as well, both in the general story and in gameplay. For example, if one group of characters leaves a sacred relic somewhere, another character may come and find it on a later day in their own part of the game. After successfully completing all three scenarios, players must take on a fourth, featuring the roving thief Dune and the heroes from the previous three chapters in their final confrontation with the game's major villains.

=== Story ===
Before the events of the game, the Majestic Four created the world, the most powerful of them being Mitra who was also the creator of the Earth and the Moon. They then gave life to an entity known as a Rudra with power from the Guardian of Evolution, Gomorrah, who uses his Eternal Engine to facilitate new beings.

Every 4,000 years, a Rudra appears with a race of its own and the race that came before it is destroyed or driven to near extinction. Former Rudras have since become fossils that archaeologists refer to as Lago Stones. During the Great Cycle, the Danans were succeeded by the Merfolk, the Reptiles, the Giants and finally by the Humans.

At the start of the game, fifteen days remain before the coming of a new Rudra and the end of humanity begins. The characters Sion, Surlent, Riza and Dune each come into possession of a Jade, a treasure discovered in the Lago Stones. It is later revealed that Gomorrah requires the Jades in addition to other treasures to create a perfect Rudra, and that a weapon known as Sodom destroys every successive race from its lair on the Moon.

After both Gomorrah and Sodom have been thwarted by the Jadebearers, they unite and board a Danan flying vessel known as the Ark to travel to the Moon and confront Mitra. Upon defeating her, Mitra praises the Jadebearers for their strength and reveals that long ago the Majestic Four once fought a force known as the Destroyers who were a threat to the world. When the Majestic Four won, Mitra knew the Destroyers would one day return and resolved to defeat them by creating a perfect race through evolution while using the 4,000 year cycle to replace weak races with stronger ones. In an instant, Mitra passes on her knowledge of the Eternal Engine to Dune and also leaves the task of fighting the Destroyers to the human race.

During the ending, the party return home and experience a vision of a world brought to ruin by the Destroyers, which Dune interprets as a warning from Mitra. He considers using the Eternal Engine to evolve humanity, but the Jadebearers decide against it so they do not repeat Mitra's actions, and instead choose to let the human race evolve naturally.

== Development and release ==
Treasure of the Rudras was developed by Square, specifically its Osaka division. The company is best known for RPG franchises like Final Fantasy and SaGa. Many of the staff members for Treasure of the Rudras had previously worked on Final Fantasy Legend III (SaGa 3) and Final Fantasy Mystic Quest, notably director Kouji Ide. Production began in 1993 and would last three years. Ide revealed that his team started by conceiving its magic system, basing the inclusion of kotodama on the cultural appreciation for word play in Japan. Battle planner Masahiro Kataoka proposed that gamers could exchange discovered words with their friends as a way to progress through the game.

Field planner Masato Yagi was hired in 1994 to create the game's maps and claimed he was given freedom to make them as he pleased. Despite having simultaneous development with Final Fantasy VI, Yagi explained that his predecessors based Treasure of the Rudras on technology from 1992's Final Fantasy V because Square's divisions did not typically interact with one another. During the era it was in development, many games had already transitioned to utilizing 3D rendering or polygons, while Treasure of the Rudras still used 2D pixel art. Lead monster graphic designer Yuichirou Kojima chose to animate the enemy sprites (which were typically still images in Square RPGs) in order to counter the increasing prominence of 3D graphics at the time. Similarly, programmer Shingo Tanaka gave the party members a lot of movement during combat and wished to make the game's lengthy battles as stress-free as possible.

The character designer for the game was Keita Amemiya. He was originally set to design everything and magazines had advertised his involvement from the start, but Amemiya did not become officially attached to the project until a year and a half before its conclusion. A rough outline for the characters and world were already decided and he and his studio Crowd Inc. amended these illustrations. A member of Amemiya's family whom he trusted with these types of revisions then helped to decide which designs would make the final cut for the game.

Treasure of the Rudras was released for the Super Famicom on April 5, 1996. It was one of the last Square-developed titles for the console alongside Bahamut Lagoon, Super Mario RPG, and Treasure Hunter G, which were all released within four months of each other. Treasure of the Rudras was never localized outside Japan, though an English fan translation was completed. The game's unique magic system was considered to be a major obstacle for translators and required not only the text to be converted but the game's coding to be altered. Treasure of the Rudras was digitally re-released on the Wii Virtual Console in Japan on June 7, 2011, and the Wii U Virtual Console in Japan on December 2, 2015, though it became unavailable on the services when they shut down on January 21, 2019, and March 28, 2023, respectively.

=== Music ===
Ryuji Sasai composed the game's music. A 58-song soundtrack CD was released in Japan by NTT Publishing shortly after the game on April 25, 1996. A sheet music edition was released by Doremi on April 30, 1997, and features every track transcribed in simple arrangements for solo piano. The original version of the soundtrack was re-released digitally on August 8, 2008.

Songs from the game have made their way to various Square Enix compilation albums: the regular battle theme in 2007; the opening theme in 2021; and an arranged version of the Surlent scenario boss battle theme in 2012.

== Reception ==
Reception

Review scores
| Publication | Score |
|---|---|
| Famitsu | 31/40 |
| Consoles+ | 92% |
| VideoGame | 9.3 |
| Super GamePower | 4/5 |
| Jeuxvideo.com | 15/20 |

Upon its release, a quartet of writers for the Japanese magazine Famitsu awarded Treasure of the Rudras an aggregate score of 31 out of 40 points, placing it in the publication's "Silver Hall of Fame". The reviewers commended Square for continuing its track record of excellent RPGs and for making complex mechanics like the mantra-based magic system easy to understand, though one member of the panel felt that instantly switching between the game's three storylines could be disorienting to the player. Brazilian magazine VideoGame scored the game a 9.3 out of 10, commenting that it is an example of how the Super NES is the best console for role-playing games. They also applauded the graphics and gameplay as being as high quality as Square's Final Fantasy series. Rating the game 92%, the French magazine Consoles+ was equally as complimentary of the game for upholding Square's RPG pedigree of impressive presentations, storylines, and gameplay. The publication disliked the high number of battles, but admitted this was a valid criticism of many Japanese RPGs.

Retrospective evaluations of the game have been positive as well. GamesRadar+ praised its unique battle system of learning spells through words and combining them to make new ones, but noted that there were games from the mid-1990s that were more beatifically drawn and "narratively ambitious". Retro Gamer also complimented the magic system and its approach of having three branching stories that players could exit and enter at will, labeling the title a "hidden gem". Destructoid compared the plot and its many shifting perspectives to Game of Thrones, but noted that the game did not appear to have been made with the same large budget as contemporary titles, and noted the difficulty of using the linguistic magic system. Jeuxvideo.com enjoyed the title's humorous cutscenes, but were critical of the game's lack of polish. HobbyConsolas called the title one of the best games ever released for the Super NES, praising the graphical detail and the innovative magic system.
