= Xak: The Tower of Gazzel =

1991 video game

Xak Precious Package: The Tower of Gazzel
- Developer: Microcabin
- Publisher: Microcabin
- Platforms: MSX2, PC-88, PC-98
- Release: 1991
- Genres: Action role-playing game, dungeon crawl
- Mode: Single-player

Xak Precious Package: The Tower of Gazzel is a fantasy role-playing video game developed and published by the Japanese software developer Microcabin. The game is a direct sequel to Xak: The Art of Visual Stage and Xak II: The Rising of the Red Moon. While technically being the third installment of the series, The Tower of Gazzel is a sidestory taking place between the events of Xak II and Xak III. The game was released in Japan only.

== Story ==
After Latok Kart defeated Zamu Gospel during the events portrayed in Xak II, he and his friends are intrigued by rumors of a demonic tower and a man looking like Latok roaming its neighborhood. The appearance of a false Latok and the kidnapping of Rune Greed's family are ploys to lure the two descendants of Duel into the tower, laid by the villains Al Acrila, Gill Berzes and a demon called Zegraya. Using Latok and Rune, they plan to resurrect the ancient demon Gazzel, a demon with unimaginable power comparable to destroying an entire mountain in a single attack.

== Gameplay ==
The player controls Latok, looking onto the game world in bird's-eye view. Latok can swing his sword, optionally firing magical shots from its tip at the expense of magic points, and jump short distances. The player can choose to take along one of a party of four characters on his exploration of the tower. Each of these so-called 'support members' subtly change Latok's statistics, in addition to triggering different events within the game.

The entirety of the Tower is a large labyrinth spanning six floors, each with an elemental theme: darkness for the basement and respectively earth, fire, water, wind and heaven for the first through fifth floors. The game is one large puzzle with the goal of reaching the bottom floor and defeating Zegraya and Gazzel there. Many of the puzzles revolve around the fact the floors are heavily interconnected. On the floor of fire for example, there is a large wall of flames that Latok cannot pass through in any way. On the water floor above, there is a large door that once opened, pours a large amount of water into a hole in the floor, dousing the flames below.

Another part of the puzzles involves the choice of which support member to take along. Support members don't just affect Latok's combat statistics, but some points in the game can only be passed with the right support member tagging along. There are even items in the game that Latok cannot use himself, but the right support member can. As an example, Latok finds a magical scroll with a lightning spell inscribed, but doesn't master enough magic to cast them himself. On a certain part of the first floor, there is a seemingly impassable wall of rubble. When Fray is selected as a support member, she will snatch the lightning scroll from Latok and use it to blast a path through the rubble.

The game can only be saved at a fixed point at the entrance to the tower. To prevent the player having to backtrack just to save his game, various items can be found that will teleport Latok and his support member back to the entrance or to a fixed point inside the tower.

Contrary to its predecessors, The Tower of Gazzel does not use an experience point system, nor does currency of any kind appear in the game. Latok starts the game at level 50, as he was at the end of Xak II, and does not advance; this instead occurs in Xak III. New equipment is also unavailable, Latok sticks with the sword, armor and shield he had at Xak II's end throughout this game. This eliminates the need for the player to spend large amounts of time on 'leveling up', collecting enough experience points and/or gold to have the player character grow strong enough or buy new equipment, respectively. In this way, the game's emphasis is more on the puzzle aspect than on the combat. A kind of advancement system is retained in that Latok can find different pairs of gauntlets in the tower, each pair enhancing his combat statistics further.

The game engine is almost identical to Xak II's preserving the real-time combat aspect. Some music and graphics were even recycled from the previous installment. Compared to Xak II, The Tower of Gazzel runs much smoother even on a regular MSX2, prompting for much less and shorter loading times.

== Characters ==
The possible support members and their abilities are as follows:

- Fray Jerbain, emphasizes Latok's magic ability and can replenish his magic points. Adds the ability to use magic scrolls to solve puzzles.
- Lou Miri Pixie, adds to Latok's defence and can replenish his hit points. Adds the ability to activate certain mechanisms within the tower.
- Horn Ashtar, adds to Latok's magic ability and defense and can replenish his magic points. Adds the ability to read ancient languages and communicate with the spirits of the deceased.
- Rune Greed, adds to Latok's attack and defense ratings. Adds the ability to enter certain doors.
- Al Acrila, a demon that Rune Greed had a previous battle with who is out for revenge.
- Gill Berzes, a demon that Rune Greed had a previous battle with who is out for revenge.
- Zegraya, sent by the general of the demon army, Zomu Dizae, to eliminate Latok Kart and Rune Greed by any means necessary. He plans to use the power of the newly resurrected Gazzel to destroy the god's descendants.
- Gazzel, whose resurrection is the main focal point of Zegraya and his underlings.

In addition, the single save point in the game is represented by the healer Fell Bow. Except for the villains, the game uses very little non-player characters, emphasizing on the puzzling aspect even more.
