= Tomato Adventure =

2002 video game

- Japanese box art
- Developer: AlphaDream
- Publisher: Nintendo
- Directors: Yoshihiko Maekawa; Chihiro Fujioka; Jin Ito
- Producers: Shinji Hatano; Tetsuo Mizuno; Hirofumi Yokota; Yasushi Mizutani
- Designers: Yuji Abe; Takahiko Kodaira; Takahiro Murakami
- Programmers: Masami Sato; Atsushi Iwase
- Artists: Shuji Kamohara; Yoshitaka Nishikawa; Aya Takano
- Writer: Hiroyuki Kubota
- Composer: Yoko Sakai
- Platform: Game Boy Advance
- Release: JP: January 25, 2002
- Genre: Role-playing
- Modes: Single-player, multiplayer

Tomato Adventure (Note: Japanese: トマトアドベンチャー, Hepburn: Tomato Adobenchā) is a role-playing video game developed by AlphaDream and published by Nintendo for the Game Boy Advance on January 25, 2002, exclusively in Japan.

The game is recognized as a precursor to AlphaDream's Mario & Luigi role-playing game series.

== Gameplay ==
Players control DeMille through the Ketchup Kingdom while talking to people, entering places and collecting items. The objective of the game is to save DeMille's girlfriend, Patharan, and the Ketchup Kingdom from King Abira by going through every village to obtain the missing parts of a robot that can give anyone access into the Gimmick Palace, a tower-like structure with a tomato on it. In lieu of random encounters, Tomato Adventure displays enemies moving around on the overworld, with battles being initiated when DeMille makes contact with them.

== Plot ==
In the Ketchup Kingdom, a land ruled by young characters, the protagonist is a hare-like boy in blue clothing named DeMille, who lives in a school bus with no wheels in a village on the outskirts of the Ketchup Kingdom called Cobore Village. DeMille is an outcast because he dislikes tomatoes. As a result, he and other kids in Kobora who dislike tomatoes are looked down upon as "Droppers", banished for heresy, and locked up in Cobore Village until they change their attitudes towards tomatoes. While watching television, DeMille sees that the main antagonist, King Abīra, is celebrating a holiday called Tomato Day, while showing his project he created called the Super Cara-Cooker, a laser-like gun that transforms people, places, and things into dolls, toys, and playgrounds. After DeMille's television set gets severely damaged, he visits his neighbor and friend Seremo and asks him if he could fix his television set. Seremo says he will and gives DeMille his first Gimmick, called the Gear Yo-Yo.

After Seremo teaches DeMille how to use it, DeMille's girlfriend Patharan comes to tell him that she wanted him and her to venture into the dangerous Toy Ruins to look for her Fantastic Toy, the Gimmick Robo, but by the time they arrive, it is absent. Then, two purple creatures with zippers on them, Brikky and Grikky, capture Patharan with a hook. DeMille grabs on to her while being pulled up to the airship, the Carorna No.2, piloted by Brikky and Grikky. As soon as DeMille and Patharan come aboard the airship, Brikky and Grikky receive a call from King Abīra to bring Patharan to the palace and drop DeMille out of the airship. After DeMille fights Brikky and Grikky, they drop DeMille from the airship into the Tomato Pond, only for him to notice that he is standing near King Abīra's home, the Gimmick Palace, a tall, red, tower with a tomato-shaped top. When he decides to enter and save Patharan, he encounters a wall that he cannot pass through. Then, a mole named Rereku tells him that in order to pass through the wall, DeMille has to defeat the six Super Kids and obtain the six key items called Toy Parts. While DeMille goes on his adventure, he befriends some people for them to join forces with him to defeat King Abira and save Patharan and the entire Ketchup Kingdom. His partners in order of joining him are Arisa, Sofubi, and Rereku.

== Development and release ==
After AlphaDream developed and released their first video game title, Koto Battle: Tengai no Moribito, Nintendo wanted AlphaDream's permission to develop an entirely new role-playing video game with them, titled Gimmick Land (ギミックランド, Gimikku Rando). They got the name from an idea of a game structure that utilizes gimmicky, toy-like controls that make it an RPG with action elements. It was finished and almost ready to be released for the Game Boy Color in Japan, until Nintendo released the Game Boy Advance to make the Game Boy Color obsolete. After noticing that, Nintendo requested AlphaDream to redevelop and rename Gimmick Land as "Tomato Adventure" for the Game Boy Advance. Nintendo also requested AlphaDream to add some easily recognizable characters in which reflects the new title, so that the game would have a more marketable image. Those were Nintendo's largest requests. Other changes are the quality of the graphics and audio being enhanced. Only two screenshots of Gimmick Land were released to the public by the developers. A mainly complete prototype of Gimmick Land had surfaced online from the 2020 Nintendo data leak. On the release date of Tomato Adventure, Nintendo and AlphaDream announced a contest where twenty winners won themselves 1 kg of sweet tomatoes from the Kochi Virtue Valley area. The contest ended on February 28, 2002.

Tomato Adventure was not officially released in English due to the targeted age group being considered too low; problems with the battle system and the game not being received well at the time of release were other contributing factors. An unofficial English fan translation was eventually released in July 2021.

Although the game never made it outside of Japan, Tomato Adventure was planned to be released in China for the iQue Game Boy Advance under the title Fānqié Jiàng Wángguó dà Màoxiǎn (番茄酱王国大冒险 The Great Adventure in the Kingdom of Tomato Sauce), but was soon cancelled due to the huge piracy scene in China.

== Reception ==
On release, Weekly Famitsu scored the game a 29 out of 40. 1UP.com scored the game "A".

== Legacy ==
Tomato Adventure is considered as a precursor to AlphaDream's Mario & Luigi series, similarly combining RPG elements and minigames.
