= Xak I & II =

- Developer: Riot
- Publisher: Telenet Japan
- Platform: PC Engine CD
- Release: December 25, 1992
- Genre: Action role-playing game
- Mode: Single-player

Xak I & II is a re-release of Xak (1989) and Xak II (1990), a fantasy role-playing video game series Xak developed and published by the Japanese software developer Microcabin and Telenet Japan's development team Riot. This set contains both the first two Xak series games back-to-back on one complete Super CD-Rom^2 with enhanced graphics and sound. In a similar style to Ys I & II, also for the PC Engine system, Xak II, the second game in the series picks up immediately as the first game concludes. Xak I & II was a Japanese release only. The MSX2 and PC Engine versions have been translated.

== Setting and story ==
Xak features a typical high fantasy setting. According to the game world's legends, a great war was fought between the benevolent but weakening ancient gods and a demon race, which led to the collapse and eventual mortality of the gods. After this 'War of Sealing', the gods divided the world into three parts: Xak, the world of humans, Oceanity, the world of faeries, and Xexis, the world of demons. The demon world of Xexis was tightly sealed from the other two worlds as to prevent reentry of the warmongering demon race. Some demons were left behind in Xak, however, and others managed to discover a separate means to enter Xak from Xexis anyway.

One them, Badu, was a very powerful demon, able to use coercive magic to make humans do his bidding. Duel, the god of war, managed to defeat Badu and seal him away in a mountain of ice for 250 years. The god later settled in a village known as Fearless to live out the rest of his mortal life.

At the beginning of the game, Badu's prison is broken. Demons overrun parts of Xak once again. In order to stop the ravaging of his lands, the King of Wavis sends a messenger faerie to Dork Kart, a famous warrior living in the village of Fearless. Dork, however, has gone missing. The player takes on the role of Latok Kart, Dork's 16-year-old son, as he meets the messenger faerie, Pixie. Latok embarks on the King's quest to slay Badu, hoping to find his father along the way.

In his travels, Latok is guided by Duel's spirit. Over the course of the game, it turns out that Dork and thus Latok is a descendant of Duel.

As this first adventure ends, Latok is able to triumph over the demon Zemu Badu. One of Badu's minions escaped, a black-robed man known only as Necromancer. Three years later, the Necromancer is able to contact one of his allies from the demon world of Xexis: a fearsome demon called Zamu Gospel. Following a prophecy foretold by an ancient and extremely powerful sorcerer by the name of Amadok, the Necromancer and three other demons (referred to as Demonlords) are attempting to complete a dark ritual which will revive Zamu Gospel into the world of Xak.

Xak's setting is centered on Latok's hometown of Fearless and his journeys take him to several other towns, fortresses and villages and eventually into a secret underground world known as the Land of Fire as he makes his way to the royal palace of Wavis.

Xak II's setting is a vast region situated around a single central village of Banuwa to the North of the locations of areas visited in Xak and its neighbouring forests, crystal mines, an ancient castle and a mountainous island ruin.

== Characters ==
Latok is the only playable character in the game. Notable non-player characters Latok meets include:

- Lou Miri Pixie, the green-haired messenger faerie sent by the King of Wavis that guides Latok along his way.
- Freya "Fray" Jerbarn, a blue-haired girl Latok rescues from a wolf-infested forest. Fray is the main heroine of a Xak series spin-off, Fray in Magical Adventure and its remake Fray CD, but during the course of Xak she does not know yet how to use magic. During the events of Xak II, Fray has become a full-fledged sorceress and travels to aid Latok in his quest.
- Rune Greed, a green-haired warrior. He is a descendant of Duel as well and is on a quest to slay Badu and the demons all of his own.
- Rabbie, a magician's familiar rabbit given to Latok.
- Duel, the god of war, living on in spirit form.
- Elise, a childhood friend of Latok and the granddaughter of Fearless's mayor. She could be considered as a possible romantic interest of Latok.
- Saria, Latok's Mother, who is blind. Latok has taken care of her ever since his father disappeared.
- Bobby, the pacifist son of the blacksmith Dac of the town of Fearless.
- Nurse Elle, the nurse of the village of Fearless.
- Kane, a magician in the hobbit village of Nemnu who gives Latok a mascot familiar named Rabbie.
- Rachael, a girl whose father is in charge of a resistance hideout against the demons in the Land of Fire.
- Shana Tautook, a young girl who was raised by forest dwellers who plays an important role in a demonic prophecy surrounding Gospel's resurrection.
- Mune Tautook, Shana's twin sister who was captured by demons at birth and separated the Tautook family.
- Zeke Bordeaux, Banuwa's dourn and tight-lipped arms dealer who has a history with Latok's father as he and Dork Kart were two of the three Legendary Fencers of Wavis.
- Fell Bow, a nun and the sister of Wavis general Nill Bow whose family's duty is to protect the White Xak Dipole and guide the descendants of Duel in their quest.
- Horn Ashtar, a bard that is traveling the world to find out what his true purpose is.
- Dr. Baspa, a doctor of Banuwa village who aids Latok on his quest and eventually presents Latok with a cure to his mother's blindness.
- Ray Deal, a captain of a ship called the Sinary who due to tragic incident lost his best friend and his entire crew.
- Zuun, a demon disguised as a human man who Latok accidentally sets free.
- Badu, the main villain of the game who was recently released from his 250-year imprisonment.
- Bigoreous, the younger brother of Bogoreous, the Western demonlord.
- Bogoreous, the Western demonlord and a master of earth magic under the service of Zamu Gospel.
- Ebu Fyl, the Eastern demonlord and a master of water magic under the service of Zamu Gospel.
- Abu Baal, the Southern demonlord that has possessed the body and mind of Jerome Vordis, a person of close connection with Captain Ray Deal. He is a master of wind magic under the service of Zamu Gospel.
- The Necromancer, a powerful black-robed demon with power over the dead who is the Northern demonlord under the service of Zemu Badu and Zamu Gospel. The Necromancer is a recurring villain in the series.
- Zamu Gospel, the main villain of the game and a powerful demon who was prophesied by a powerful sorcerer to be resurrected through an ancient ritual.

== Gameplay ==
Xak I & II is a classic dungeon crawl, in that the game proceeds by the player finding his way through labyrinthine maps, defeating opposing monsters on the way. In each map, keys, NPCs and other objects have to be found to gain entrance to the room where a boss dwells. After defeating the boss, the player can proceed towards the next map, where the structure repeats. Various sub-quests involving NPCs are present, most of them obligatory.

Combat is in real-time. The player's character walks around on the game maps, as well as the monster characters. Each character has an attack and defense rating, different for each of its four sides. Moreover, Latok's ratings change depending on whether he has his sword drawn (as the player keeps the space bar depressed) or sheathed. As Latok or a monster takes damage or wards off an attack, the character is pushed backwards. This combat system requires some manual dexterity, especially during boss fights—bosses are generally several times larger than Latok himself.

Latok advances in power through a classic leveling system. Moreover, there are several shops scattered through the game where Latok can buy stronger swords, armors and shields. Gold, the game's currency, and experience points are awarded for killing monsters that wander the map.
