= Ryuji Sasai =

Japanese musician

- Born: December 21, 1961 (age 63); Osaka Prefecture, Japan
- Genres: Rock
- Occupations: Composer, songwriter
- Instruments: Bass guitar, vocals
- Years active: 1982-present

Ryuji Sasai (笹井隆司, Sasai Ryūji; born December 21, 1961) is a Japanese video game composer and bass guitarist. He is best known for his work on Xak, Final Fantasy Legend III and Final Fantasy Mystic Quest. His musical career came about when he was 15 years old, and he formed a band. Before entering the gaming industry, Sasai was involved in the anime department, scoring two television series and a film. After creating music for four games as a freelancer, he was employed at Square from 1991 to 1998, where he worked on five games in total. Sasai often collaborated with fellow composers Tadahiro Nitta and Chihiro Fujioka during his career. He has also been a member of the rock bands Novela and Action and is currently performing as a bassist.

== Biography ==
Born in Osaka, Japan, Sasai began his musical career at the age of 15, playing instruments and forming a band. In 1982, he joined the rock band Novela; he was an instrumentalist and songwriter for several albums. During his stint with the band, he composed music for the anime series The Mysterious Cities of Gold (1982) and Adventures of the Little Koala (1984). After Novela dissolved in 1984, he provided the score for the 1986 film Windaria alongside Satoshi Kadokura. He became a member of the band Action in 1988, where he was a bass guitarist and a backing vocalist; the band was active for a decade.

His debut as a video game composer came with Crystal Software's Mugen No Shinzo III in 1989 with Chihiro Fujioka. After sending his demo tapes and résumé to every software house and game company listed in the PC-specialized magazines, he got one response from Micro Cabin. He then composed music for three Xak games with Tadahiro Nitta: Xak: The Art of Visual Stage, Fray in Magical Adventure, and Xak II: The Rising of the Red Moon. During this time, he was working as a freelance composer under pseudonyms for unspecified titles. In 1991, after Square hired Fujioka to be a director, Sasai was invited to join the company as they needed composers to assist Nobuo Uematsu and Kenji Ito. His first assignment was to create the soundtrack to the Game Boy title Final Fantasy Legend III. Sasai composed the majority of the score, with director Fujioka handling four pieces.

His subsequent work for Square was 1992's Final Fantasy Mystic Quest (known as "Mystic Quest Legend" in Europe), which he composed with Yasuhiro Kawakami; it was the first game in the Final Fantasy series not composed by regular series composer Uematsu. After a hiatus during the peak of Action's activity, Square assigned Sasai as the sole composer for the Japan-exclusive game Rudra no Hihō (1996). Afterward, he contributed the track "Character Select" for the score to the multi-composer game Tobal No. 1; the games arranged album, Tobal No. 1 Remixes Electrical Indian, featured the song. The music team GUIDO completed the album's arrangement.

After completing the score to Bushido Blade 2 and Action dispersed in 1998, Sasai left Square. He was initially going to score two role-playing games after Bushido Blade 2, but it did not come to pass due to circumstances with the company. Since the company had not given him any other assignments, he decided to leave Square. Sasai is currently a bass guitarist for the Queen tribute band Queen Mania and the rock band Spiders from Cabaret.

== Musical style and influences ==
Sasai's Bushido Blade 2 soundtrack consists of hard rock music and traditional Japanese instruments and harmonies. A member of the tribute band Queen Mania, Sasai cites Queen as a significant musical influence. Preferring the musical genres heavy metal and alternative rock, his favorite bands are Extreme, Judas Priest, and Red Hot Chili Peppers. He has said that he also listens to hard rock and progressive rock. When he started working in the game industry, he immersed himself in film and classical music.

== Works ==
| Year | Game | Notes | Ref. |
|---|---|---|---|
| 1982 | The Mysterious Cities of Gold | anime with Haim Saban and Shuki Levy | |
| 1984 | Adventures of the Little Koala | anime | |
| 1986 | Windaria | anime with Satoshi Kadokura | |
| 1989 | Xak: The Art of Visual Stage | Tadahiro Nitta | |
| 1990 | Fray in Magical Adventure | Tadahiro Nitta | |
| 1990 | Xak II: The Rising of the Red Moon | Tadahiro Nitta | |
| 1991 | Final Fantasy Legend III | Chihiro Fujioka | |
| 1992 | Final Fantasy Mystic Quest | Yasuhiro Kawakami | |
| 1996 | Rudra no Hihō | | |
| 1996 | Tobal No. 1 | with several others | |
| 1998 | Bushido Blade 2 | | |
