= Ted Woolsey =

American video game translator

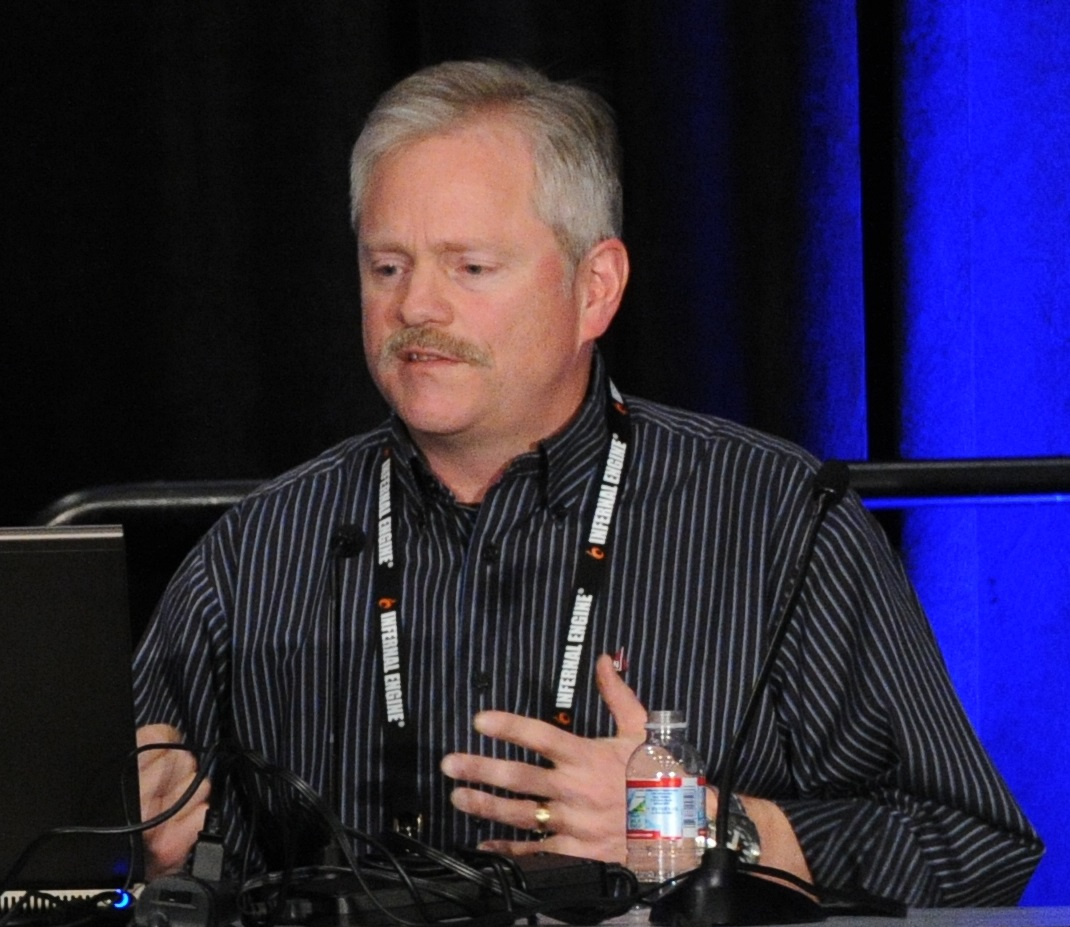
- Woolsey in 2012
- Occupations: Translator, video game producer
- Years active: 1991–present
- Notable work: Final Fantasy VI, Secret of Mana, Super Mario RPG, Chrono Trigger

Ted Woolsey is an American video game translator and producer. He had the primary role in the North American production and localization of Square's role-playing video games released for the Super NES between 1991 and 1996. He is best known for translating Final Fantasy VI, Chrono Trigger and Super Mario RPG during his time at Square. Limitations on text length and strict content guidelines forced Woolsey to make many script changes in his translation work, which became known as "Woolseyisms" in popular culture and were both praised and criticized.

Woolsey resigned from Square in 1996 when the company moved offices to another city. Since then, his work in the video game industry shifted to a producer role at Big Rain, a company he co-founded, as well as others like Crave Entertainment and RealNetworks. After managing the relationship on the Microsoft Studios side for several years, Woolsey joined Undead Labs as General Manager in 2015.

== Biography ==
=== At Square ===
Although born in America, Woolsey spent five years living and studying in Japan as a young adult. He received a Bachelor of Arts degree in English literature at the University of California, Santa Barbara. He spent time as a graduate student at the University of Washington, where he completed a master's degree in Japanese literature. He quit his Ph.D. studies to join Square's American office in Redmond, Washington, shortly after that in 1991. At the time, Final Fantasy IV had just been released in the United States (under the title Final Fantasy II) and did not sell according to their expectations. At this point, Square had no localization department, and a Square employee who spoke some English ended up translating Final Fantasy II. Other employees, including one in the financial department and a senior vice president, helped with editing after hours in their spare time. Woolsey's first project with Square was the translation of Final Fantasy Legend III, and the company asked him to review and avoid a repeat of Final Fantasy II's messy translation.

During this time, Nintendo of America (NoA) had strict policies regarding what kind of content could appear in games on the Super Nintendo Entertainment System (SNES). The 1993 congressional hearings on video games had made NoA especially sensitive to "controversial" video game content, such as violence, sexuality, religion, and profanity. As a result, Woolsey had to avoid or write around these topics and translate the words at the same time. He would fly to Japan for a typical project and have about thirty days to translate a script based on the finished Japanese version of the game, which had been broken up idiosyncratically by programmers to fit in cartridge memory. He made a nearly finished translation of Final Fantasy V before Square canceled the overseas release. By the time he worked on localizing Final Fantasy VI (retitled Final Fantasy III in the United States), he was familiar enough with NoA's policies to anticipate potential violations and proactively reframe them while retaining as much of the original context and drama as possible. Another challenge was the limited storage space on SNES cartridges. English requires roughly twice as many characters as Japanese to convey the same meaning, which forced Woolsey to cut down the scripts to fit within the cartridge memory. Together, these changes have become known as "Woolseyisms" and are the subject of both criticism and praise. A famous Woolseyism is Kefka's exclamation, "Son of a submariner!"; the line was changed entirely from Japanese "Heee! Damn it!" (ヒーーー くっそー！, Hī kusō) to avoid profanity and inject character into the script. Other titles he localized included Final Fantasy Mystic Quest, Secret of Mana, Capcom's Breath of Fire, and Chrono Trigger. While at Square, Woolsey received fan mail from players who enjoyed games he worked on, as well as hate mail from people who believed his translations were inaccurate. In addition to localization, Woolsey was in charge of marketing for Square.

=== Post-Square ===
When Square's offices moved to Los Angeles in 1996, Woolsey decided to stay in Washington and leased his old employer's office space for his next company, Big Rain. Woolsey's last project with Square was the translation of Super Mario RPG and he left before the English localization of Final Fantasy VII began. At Big Rain, he served as Vice President of Marketing and Business Development. The company moved to Seattle in 1997, where Crave Entertainment purchased it. Woolsey signed on as Vice President of Internal Development and oversaw the development of Shadow Madness, a Japanese-inspired role-playing game. Upon its release in 1999, Shadow Madness sold poorly, and Woolsey left the company to join RealNetworks as the Director of Business Development. As the director, he managed RealArcade, the network's online gaming client. Between 2000 and 2004, he worked on the distribution of the service to publishers and internet service providers and helped launch RealArcade in Japan.

Woolsey moved to Microsoft Studios in 2007, where he was Senior Director of First Party Publishing for the Xbox Live Arcade service. In this role, he brought games such as Limbo, Dust: An Elysian Tail, Killer Instinct, and Ori and the Blind Forest to Xbox platforms. He later became General Manager of Undead Labs in 2015 after acting as a liaison between Microsoft and that team for four years to bring the game State of Decay to market.

== Works ==
Title	Year (Note: Sorted by year of English language release)	Platform(s)	Notes (Note: Credited as translator or localization specialist unless noted)	Ref.
Final Fantasy Mystic Quest	1992	Super NES	Translator, Writer	
Final Fantasy Legend III	1993	Game Boy	Translator	
Secret of Mana	1993	Super NES	Translator	
Breath of Fire	1994	Super NES	Translator	
Final Fantasy VI	1994	Super NES	Translator	
Chrono Trigger	1995	Super NES	Translator	
Secret of Evermore	1995	Super NES	Marketing	
Super Mario RPG	1996	Super NES	Translator	
Shadow Madness	1999	PlayStation	Producer	

== See also ==
- Localization of Square Enix video games
