= Chihiro Fujioka =

Japanese video game producer

- Born: October 24, 1959 (age 66); Osaka, Japan
- Occupations: video game composer, director, storywriter

Chihiro Fujioka (藤岡 千尋, Fujioka Chihiro; born October 24, 1959) is a Japanese video game designer, composer, and rock drummer. He has worked at Xtalsoft, Square, and AlphaDream where he is primarily known for directing Super Mario RPG as well as his involvement in several Mario & Luigi games. He is currently a member of Earthbound Papas, a band led by Nobuo Uematsu.

== Career ==
Fujioka began his career as a sound designer and composer at Xtalsoft in 1983 and quickly distinguished himself in a management capacity. He first collaborated with Ryuji Sasai on the soundtrack to Mugen no Shinzou III. When Xtalsoft was absorbed to become the Osaka branch of Technology and Entertainment Software in 1990, Fujioka became a director of the department. His first work with Square was as director of Final Fantasy Legend III on which he work with Sasai again on the soundtrack. His third involvement with Sasai was on Final Fantasy Mystic Quest with Sasai as sole composer and Fujioka writing. His most prominent role was as director of Super Mario RPG. Fujioka left Square in 2000 with a number of other employees to form AlphaDream, where he directed a number of their early games, including Tomato Adventure and a number of Hamtaro games, as well as helped design multiple Mario & Luigi games.

In addition to his game development work, Fujioka served as a drummer for a progressive rock band called Mr. Sirius. He also joined Nobuo Uematsu's band, Earthbound Papas.

== Ludography ==
Title	Year	Platform(s)	Role
Earthbound (アースバウンド)	1983	FM-7, MZ-1500, PC-6000	Author (excepting music)
Lizard (リザード)	1985	Home computer	Composer
Aspic Special	1987	Home computer	Composer
Satsui no Kaisou: Power Soft Satsujin Jiken (殺意の階層 ソフトハウス連続殺人事件)	1988	Home computer	Composer
Combat Simulator: Battle Gorilla	1988	Home computer	Composer
Burai (ブライ)	1989	Home computer	Composer
Mugen no Shinzou III (夢幻の心臓III)	1990	Home computer	Composer
Final Fantasy Legend III	1991	Game Boy	Producer, composer
Final Fantasy Mystic Quest	1992	Super Nintendo	Writer
Super Mario RPG	1996	Super Nintendo	Director
Pai Shin (牌神)	1997	PlayStation	Producer
Power Stakes Grade 1 (パワーステークスGrade 1)	1997	PlayStation	Producer
Pai Shin 2 (牌神2)	1998	PlayStation	Producer
Power Stakes 2 (パワーステークス2)	1998	PlayStation	Producer
UFO: A Day in the Life	1999	PlayStation	Event Designer
Koto Battle: Tengai no Moribito	2001	Game Boy Color	Director
Tomato Adventure	2002	Game Boy Advance	Director
Hamtaro: Rainbow Rescue	2003	Game Boy Advance	Director
Mario & Luigi: Superstar Saga	2003	Game Boy Advance	Special Thanks
Hamtaro: Ham-Ham Games	2004	Game Boy Advance	Director
Mario & Luigi: Partners in Time	2005	Nintendo DS	Field design
Hi Hamtaro! Ham-Ham Training	2007	Nintendo DS	Director
Mario & Luigi: Bowser's Inside Story	2009	Nintendo DS	Field design
Mario & Luigi: Dream Team	2013	Nintendo 3DS	Menu Design
Fairy Fencer F	2013	PlayStation 3, PlayStation 4, Microsoft Windows	Main theme, with Earthbound Papas
Megadimension Neptunia VII	2015	PlayStation 4	Composer
Mario & Luigi: Paper Jam	2016	Nintendo 3DS	World Design
Mario & Luigi: Bowser's Inside Story + Bowser Jr.'s Journey	2019	Nintendo 3DS	Music & Arrangement Sound Effects
Mario & Sonic at the Olympic Games Tokyo 2020	2019	Nintendo Switch	Game Design
Fantasian	2021	iOS	Game Design
Mario & Luigi: Brothership	2024	Nintendo Switch	Event Game Designer
