= Final Fantasy Mystic Quest =

1992 video game

- North American box art
- Developer: Square
- Publishers: JP/NA: Square; PAL: Nintendo
- Director: Kouzi Ide
- Writers: Chihiro Fujioka; Yoshihiko Maekawa; Ted Woolsey
- Composers: Ryuji Sasai; Yasuhiro Kawakami
- Series: Final Fantasy
- Platform: Super NES
- Release: NA: October 1992; JP: September 10, 1993; EU: October 1993
- Genre: Role-playing
- Mode: Single-player

Final Fantasy Mystic Quest, released as Mystic Quest Legend in PAL regions and as Final Fantasy USA: Mystic Quest (Note: Japanese: ファイナルファンタジーUSA ミスティッククエスト, Hepburn: Fainaru Fantajī USA Misutikku Kuesuto) in Japan, is a 1992 role-playing video game developed and published by Square for the Super Nintendo Entertainment System. It is a spin-off of the broader Final Fantasy series. Final Fantasy Mystic Quest was first released in North America in 1992 and marketed as a "simplified role-playing game... designed for the entry-level player" in an attempt to broaden the genre's appeal. The game's presentation and battle system is broadly similar to that of the main series, but differs in its inclusion of action-adventure game elements. It was also the first Final Fantasy game to be released in Europe.

The player controls a youth named Benjamin in his quest to save the world. His goal is to reclaim a set of stolen crystals that determine the state of the world's four elemental powers. The gameplay takes a departure from the main series in a variety of ways, eliminating many series staples such as random battles, save points, manual equipment, and the party system. The game received middling reviews and sales in North America and Japan, citing its simplified gameplay and lack of depth in the game's story. It has retained its reputation for being a "beginner's Final Fantasy" and has been praised for its music.

== Gameplay ==
=== Exploration ===
Like previous games in the series, Final Fantasy Mystic Quest is presented in a top-down perspective, with players directly navigating the main character around the world to interact with objects and people. The game features a unique way of traveling the world map. Unlike past Final Fantasy games, players cannot freely roam the world map. Instead, they travel along set paths from one "icon" (pictorial image on the world map) to the next. Some routes are blocked off (restriction is indicated by a gray arrow), but become accessible when the player succeeds in a specific task, such as completing a dungeon. Once its path is open, the player can enter an icon; the game's plot and action takes place within these icons, which include towns, dungeons, and battlefields. The game is characterized by featuring action-adventure game elements; besides jumping, players can use weapons outside of battle, which play an active role in exploration. Players can chop down trees with an axe, detonate bombs to open sealed doorways, or use a grappling hook to clear wide gaps. The game has more puzzles than earlier Final Fantasy games. In the Falls Basin, for example, players must move pillars of ice across the ground level in such a fashion that they can be used as platforms to jump across on the second level. Mystic Quest does away with save points; players can save their progress at any time during exploration.

=== Battle system ===
Benjamin and Tristam facing enemies on the battle screen

Final Fantasy Mystic Quest eliminates the system of random enemy encounters, a trademark of the main series. Instead, battles are represented in dungeons as stationary enemy sprites, and the player is given the option of approaching the enemy and engaging a battle. Once engaged in battle, the player is thrust into the battle screen, which presents a window-based menu with three commands to choose from: battle, run, or control. Running from battle transports the player back to the field screen, while choosing "control" toggles between the ally's battle mode, where the player can manually control the main character's ally or opt for a computer-controlled ally. If players choose to battle, they are presented with a submenu of four more options: physically attack the enemy, cast a spell, use a curative item (such as a Cure potion), or defend. The game's battle system relies on conditional turn-based combat, where the characters and enemies cycle through rounds in battling each other, with the first action of the turn awarded to the fastest character. Enemy sprites are always far larger than player sprites in battle, despite appearing further away from the game camera. Some animals attack by physically crushing the players.

Character health is represented by an incremental life bar, although the player may choose to have it displayed in numerical fractions as in most role-playing games. If all character life bars reach zero, the game is over, but the player is given the option of continuing and restarting the battle. If the player chooses this option, however, the main character's attack power may suffer temporarily as a penalty. A character's performance in battle is determined by numerical figures (called statistics) for vitality, attacking power, defensive capabilities, speed, magical prowess, accuracy, and evasion. Character statistics are driven by experience points (EXP) gained from winning battles, which accumulate until players achieve milestones known as "experience levels". Besides awarding experience points, battling enemies also earns the player gold pieces (GP), which can be used to buy weapons, armor, and curative items. In the absence of random enemy encounters, battlefields are scattered across the world map. Players are immediately thrust into a battle when entering a battlefield, and must win ten enemy battles to "clean out" the battlefield. Once a battlefield is cleaned out, players are awarded either a large amount of experience, a large amount of GP, a piece of armor, or a magic spell.

=== Customization ===
The hero uses a grappling hook on a stationary pre-set loop in order to cross a gap.

Unlike all other Final Fantasy games, players cannot manually equip characters with armor. Instead, newly acquired armor replaces the main character's current equipment, or upgrades a current version of a weapon, e.g. obtaining the knight sword will replace the steel sword. Using the L and R buttons allows the user to cycle through the weapons that have been collected so far. Benjamin uses four types of weapons: swords, axes, bombs, and claws. Although the weapons share a similar function in battle, all have different purposes when exploring the field map. The Dragon Claw, for example, doubles as a grappling hook. The weapon arsenal in Final Fantasy Mystic Quest is considerably smaller than most role-playing games.

Magic in Mystic Quest is not learned by designated spellcasters through experience. Instead, the main character acquires magic spells through treasure chests or as a reward for clearing out battlefields. The system of spellcasting is similar to that of the original Final Fantasy; rather than using magic points to draw upon for supplying magic, spells are used according to a set number for their type, i.e., white magic, black magic, or wizard magic. The allotted number for each type increases as a character levels up. A spell's effectiveness is proportional to a character's experience level; the higher the character's level, the more powerful the Fire spell, for example. The spell catalog in Mystic Quest is limited compared to most other Final Fantasy games. Items in the game are analogous to the spells. Notably, the Heal spell and potion act as a cure-all for status ailments, eliminating the need for unique status recovery items. Similarly, the Cure spell and potion each restore 25% of player's maximum hit points regardless of level, so there is no need for a range of potion or spell strengths.

== Plot ==
=== Setting ===
Final Fantasy Mystic Quest takes place on a single continent of an unnamed world, which is divided into four distinct regions: Foresta, Aquaria, Fireburg, and Windia. The welfare of each region is determined by the state of one of four shining crystals: earth, water, fire, and wind, respectively. For centuries the Focus Tower had stood at the heart of the world. It had been a center for trade and knowledge, and the world's people met there to peacefully settle their differences. But on one warm summer day, powerful monsters stormed the Tower, stole the four crystals, and took off with the magical coins that kept the Tower's doors unlocked. The monsters began consuming the power of the crystals; they grew in strength while the world began to decay. An old prophecy tells that at the time the "vile four" steal the power and divide the world behind four doors, a knight will appear to vanquish the darkness.

=== Story ===
The game opens with an adventurous youth named Benjamin climbing the Hill of Destiny. While exploring, his village is destroyed in an earthquake. As Benjamin is climbing the Hill, he meets a mysterious old man who charges Benjamin with fulfilling the knight's prophecy. Although initially in disbelief, Benjamin accepts the role and the Old Man shows him the Focus Tower, supposedly the center of the World. After defeating a monster at the top of the hill, Benjamin follows the Old Man to the Level Forest, where he is tasked with recovering the Crystal of Earth. Proceeding to Foresta, he meets with an axe-wielding girl named Kaeli, who agrees to help Benjamin if he can help her rid the Level Forest of monsters. Kaeli is ambushed and poisoned in the process, and her mother informs Benjamin of the Elixir and where it can be found. Benjamin's search for Elixir to heal Kaeli brings him to Bone Dungeon, where he's aided by a treasure hunter named Tristam in succeeding dual purposes: not only does Benjamin get Elixir from Tristam to heal Kaeli, but he defeats one of the four Vile Evils, Flamerous Rex, to free the Crystal of Earth and in turn restore life to the dying village of Foresta. Tristam leaves and Benjamin heals Kaeli.

Benjamin is told that Aquaria is in danger, and is in need of help. He is told by the Old Man and various others that he should see Spencer. He is told that a girl named Phoebe can help him as well. After proceeding through the first stage of the Focus Tower, and arriving in the province of Aquaria, Benjamin locates Phoebe, and learns that Spencer is trapped underground by thick ice floes. Phoebe needs the "wakewater", which is said to be able to help free Aquaria. Benjamin and Phoebe head to the Wintry Cave and defeat a monster to obtain the Libra Crest. Using this crest to enter Life Temple from the Libra Temple, they find that the source of the "wakewater" has dried up. Finding the Old Man in the back of the Life Temple, they find that he holds the only bag of wakewater, and to use it on the plant in the center of town. Back in Aquaria, they find that the wakewater does not work, and reviving the crystal is the only thing that will save the town and Spencer. They head off for the Ice Pyramid and defeat the second of the Vile Evils, the Ice Golem. The Water Crystal is saved, and Benjamin and Phoebe head back to Aquaria. They find the town is now like Foresta after the crystal is revived there and Spencer is back and digging his tunnel to save Kaeli's father Captain Mac. Upon leaving, Spencer hands the Venus Key to Benjamin, and tells him to head for Fireburg.

Benjamin arrives in the Focus Tower to find the Old Man again, who tells him to find Reuben, and disappears. Benjamin heads for Fireburg, and finds Reuben. Reuben joins when Benjamin promises to help free Reuben's dad, Arion. Upon finding Tristam in the Inn who gives Benjamin the Multi-Key, they find the coward who left Arion in the mine in a locked house. He teaches Benjamin how to throw the bombs and says that it will free Arion. Benjamin and Reuben then proceed to the Mine and free Arion. Arion tells some tales of how the Fire Crystal has gone berserk, and Reuben goes off with Benjamin to the Volcano to stop the Vile Evil from stealing the crystal's power. After defeating the Dualhead Hydra, Benjamin and Reuben find the Fire Crystal returning to power. They decide to head to Windia, and Reuben is ambushed by monsters and falls off the rope bridge. Tristam comes along and helps Benjamin cross the bridge, but they are stymied by a tree who won't talk to them. Tristam says that there is a gal in Foresta who can talk to tree spirits, and the two drop in on Aquaria where Kaeli was trying to find Spencer. Benjamin and Tristam go down into the tunnel and find Spencer, who tells Tristam of a great treasure. They leave, and Phoebe plants a bomb that collapses a tunnel Spencer was building. She leaves to tell Spencer what happened, and Benjamin takes Kaeli to the Alive Forest to talk to the dormant tree spirit. He tells them that he will take them to Windia if they kill the monsters dwelling within him. They do and he takes them to Windia.

Upon arriving in Windia, Benjamin and Kaeli find Otto, whose daughter Norma was caught in Pazuzu's Tower when the winds from nearby Mount Gale knocked out his Rainbow Road. The only way the road works is when there is no wind, so Benjamin and Kaeli proceed to Mount Gale and stop the wind by defeating a powerful monster at the top. After returning to Windia, Otto powers up the Rainbow Road and the two adventurers proceed to Pazuzu's Tower. After giving chase, they corner Pazuzu and defeat the fourth Vile Evil and restore the Wind Crystal. Norma is reunited with Otto, and Kaeli stays to take care of her. Reuben shows up and after a series of long events Captain Mac is rescued. Reuben falls down because of the injury sustained on the Rope Bridge, and Phoebe joins Benjamin instead.

The Old Man tells Benjamin an ominous addendum to the prophecy: "The one behind the four is darker than the night, and rises midst the land". It becomes known that the Dark King is the true source of evil. Benjamin thus sails to Doom Castle to confront the Dark King, who threatens to enslave Benjamin along with the rest of mankind. The Dark King claims that he wrote and spread the prophecy Benjamin had followed throughout his quest. Once the Dark King is defeated, the old man congratulates Benjamin and reveals that he is the Crystal of Light in the guise of a human. At the end of the game, Benjamin is seen still craving adventure, and he borrows the ship from Captain Mac as his friends gather to wish him off. While sailing, Tristam makes a surprise appearance.

== Development ==
Although designed by one of Square's development teams in Japan, Final Fantasy Mystic Quest was specifically geared for the U.S. market. At the time, console role-playing games were not a major genre in North America; Square thus attempted to broaden the genre's appeal through this title. Square had already released several Final Fantasy spin-offs in North America, including the first three titles in the SaGa series as Final Fantasy Legend, and the first Mana series game as Final Fantasy Adventure, and wished to further break into the popular American consciousness. Square's executives cited the alleged difficulty of role-playing games as the reason Americans shied away from them, and eased the difficulty level by tweaking various aspects of the main series' gameplay. The American release of Final Fantasy IV was altered to make the game simpler, for example. Mystic Quest was to take this one step further, and the Japanese developers worked with the American offices to make sure the game was accessible to children.

Mystic Quest was developed in a graphic and gameplay style similar to Final Fantasy Legend III (part of the aforementioned SaGa series). The gameplay shares numerous similarities with that title, featuring a very similar battle system, graphical interface, and dungeon system. Even the jump feature from Final Fantasy Legend III has been reproduced, and almost all of the icons - from caves to the enemy sprites - are a color-upgraded version of Final Fantasy Legend III's character set. Besides allowing for computer-controlled allies, the game did away with random battles, complicated storylines, and text-based menus. To appeal to the perceived tastes of North American audiences, which gravitated towards fast-paced games, Square included action-adventure game elements; players could now brandish weapons outside of battle, jump, use a grappling hook, and set bombs to open new paths. North American translator Ted Woolsey explained that "the action/adventure players... are larger in numbers and the demographic is different. They tend to be younger and like the idea of jumping straight into the action with a sword in their hands; it's an empowerment issue - you get to go out there, start whacking things and it feels good! With the more traditional RPGs, it takes a good 15 or 20 hours of playing before you're finally hooked". Woolsey said that Mystic Quest was one of the easiest games he had to translate, due to the game's small size. Because the game was marketed towards a younger demographic, the game sold for US$39.99.

=== Release ===
After its U.S. debut, Final Fantasy Mystic Quest was released in Japan under the title Final Fantasy USA: Mystic Quest. The European release of the game was released in English, German and French. The European release had its title changed to Mystic Quest Legend to avoid confusion with Final Fantasy Adventure, which had been released in Europe as Mystic Quest. Final Fantasy Mystic Quest was first unveiled in June at the 1992 Summer Consumer Electronics Show in Chicago, where it was a popular venue, and the game was later presented in more detail in the Fall 1992 issue of the Ogopogo Examiner.

In October 2010, the game was released on the Wii's Virtual Console.

=== Audio ===
The game's soundtrack was composed by Ryuji Sasai and Yasuhiro Kawakami. It was one of the first games bearing the Final Fantasy name not to be composed by series regular Nobuo Uematsu, after Final Fantasy Adventure (known in Japan as Seiken Densetsu: Final Fantasy Gaiden) and the Final Fantasy Legend trilogy (known in Japan as the Sa·Ga trilogy). The album was first released on one compact disc by NTT Publishing on September 10, 1993. ROM capacity limits and hardware limitations made the composition process difficult. After the game was completed, Sasai recorded two remixes on his days off for the game's album, and personally played the guitar parts. "Mountain Range of Whirlwinds" was built off of Sasai's liking of the sound of the french horn, and its ability to go the length of the song and convey a sense of mountains. The track "Last Castle" was written in a short time, and was used to create imagery of a field, but its length left very little space for the "Battle 3" song.'

Final Fantasy Mystic Quest Original Soundtrack listing
| No. | Title | Length |
|---|---|---|
| 1. | "MYSTIC RE-QUEST I" | 4:14 |
| 2. | "MYSTIC RE-QUEST II" | 4:11 |
| 3. | "Mystic Quest" | 2:22 |
| 4. | "Hill of Fate" | 1:28 |
| 5. | "World" | 0:47 |
| 6. | "Beautiful Forest" | 2:30 |
| 7. | "Battle 1" | 2:22 |
| 8. | "Victory Fanfare" | 0:33 |
| 9. | "City of Forest" | 2:18 |
| 10. | "Fossil Labyrinth" | 1:35 |
| 11. | "Battle 2" | 1:47 |
| 12. | "Middle Tower" | 1:25 |
| 13. | "Shrine of Light" | 3:14 |
| 14. | "Rock Theme" | 1:12 |
| 15. | "Fanfare of Friendship" | 0:06 |
| 16. | "Dungeon of Ice" | 2:52 |
| 17. | "Dungeon of Waterfall" | 2:21 |
| 18. | "City of Fire - Faeria" | 1:59 |
| 19. | "Rock 'n' Roll" | 1:03 |
| 20. | "Lava Dome" | 1:46 |
| 21. | "City of Wind - Windaria" | 2:28 |
| 22. | "Mountain Range of Whirlwinds" | 2:15 |
| 23. | "The Crystal" | 1:16 |
| 24. | "Last Castle" | 2:33 |
| 25. | "Battle 3" | 2:10 |
| 26. | "Mystic Ballad" | 2:18 |
| 27. | "Ending" | 2:18 |
| 28. | "RE-MIXTIC QUEST" | 7:36 |

== Reception ==
Reception

Aggregate score
| Aggregator | Score |
|---|---|
| GameRankings | 67% |

Review scores
| Publication | Score |
|---|---|
| Electronic Gaming Monthly | 7/10, 8/10, 7/10, 7/10 |
| Famitsu | 23/40 |
| GamePro | 16/20 |
| GamesMaster | 75% |
| RPGFan | 79% |
| Electronic Games | 86% |

According to Square's publicity department, Final Fantasy Mystic Quest sold a total of 800,000 units, with roughly half of these sold in Japan.

The game did not generate much excitement in either America or Japan, although it is thought to have appealed to younger fans. The game ultimately failed in its bid to bring mainstream North American popularity to console RPGs, and simultaneously alienated fans of the series anticipating another epic following Final Fantasy IV. Electronic Games described the title as "Final Fantasy with an identity crisis" due to the inherent flaw of creating a game that didn't appeal to the masses or the hard-core gaming audience.

Reviews written in the years after its initial release remained largely negative. After the Wii Virtual Console release, Kotaku dubbed it "The Worst Final Fantasy" in the title of the review, and GamesRadar called it a "franchise embarrassment" for its enemies that stand still and wait for players to attack. IGN rated the Wii Virtual Console release a 6.0, or "Okay", citing an extremely repetitive and simple battle system, and very little character development. 1UP.com rated the game a "Not Worth It!", calling it "handholding" and "insubstantial".

It was, however, praised for its music, including 1UP.com praising its "sweet sampled metal guitar licks", and listed the final boss battle music as one of the must download songs for the Final Fantasy music game Theatrhythm Final Fantasy. It was also praised by GamesRadar for its music, mentioning the boss battle in their "Game Music of the Day" column, and also mentioning the rest of the game music as smooth and easy listening. On April 1, 2006, GameSpot included Mystic Quest in an April's Fools list entitled "Top 10 Final Fantasy Games", which mostly consisted of spin-offs from the main series and unrelated games. Mystic Quest was "praised" for being easy and having simplistic graphics and plot. Famitsu has also reported that Square was preparing the game for release on the Android mobile platform in 2012. In 2018, Complex ranked the game 66th on their "The Best Super Nintendo Games of All Time". They liked the game being a simple more laid back Final Fantasy game and also liked the game music.

The main character Benjamin and several songs have appeared in Theatrhythm Final Fantasy: Curtain Call and Theatrhythm Final Bar Line.
