= Shadow Madness =

1999 video game

- European PlayStation cover art
- Developer: Craveyard Studios (Note: Additional work by Lobotomy Studios.)
- Publishers: NA: Crave Entertainment; EU: Sony Computer Entertainment
- Producers: Ted Woolsey; Tracey Montoya
- Designers: Ted Woolsey; Paul Reed
- Artist: Annabella Serra
- Writer: Paul Reed
- Composer: Brad Spear
- Platform: PlayStation
- Release: NA: May 25, 1999; EU: February 25, 2000
- Genre: Role-playing
- Mode: Single-player

Shadow Madness is a role-playing video game developed by Craveyard Studios and published by Crave Entertainment for the PlayStation. Set in the world of Arkose, the player takes the role as Stinger, whose town has just been destroyed as a result of a mysterious plague that is spreading quickly across the land. Stinger meets many friends and foes on his way to finding out how the chaos started and how it can be stopped. In traditional RPG fashion, gameplay consists of exploring towns and dungeons, collecting equipment and items, and interacting with non-player characters in environments featuring 3D polygonal models set on 2D pre-rendered backgrounds. Random, turn-based battles take place in fully-3D environments, where the player can execute various attacks and spells against enemies, gain experience points, and increase characters' attributes.

Development of Shadow Madness began with ex-Square employees who remained in Redmond, Washington when its North American division moved to Los Angeles. The group, called Big Rain, was led by Ted Woolsey, a translator responsible for localizing Square's prominent Super Nintendo Entertainment System (SNES) RPGs. After announcing Shadow Madness during the summer of 1997, publisher ASCII Entertainment quickly dropped the game. The rights were subsequently purchased by Seattle-based Crave, which absorbed Big Rain and renamed the team Craveyard Studios. The developer put a large emphasis on crafting the game's story for older audiences and chose to develop it on the PlayStation due to the console's ability to display full motion video (FMV) cutscenes. Lobotomy Studios aided development by creating the game's first-person perspective minigames.

After numerous delays, Shadow Madness was released in North America in mid-1999 and in Europe in early 2000. The game was met an overall mixed response from critics, who universally compared the game to Square's Final Fantasy VII. Reviewers for Shadow Madness largely panned the graphics and gameplay but made positive comments regarding its plot, script, and musical score. Shadow Madness was a commercial failure, leading to the dissolution of both Craveyard and Lobotomy. A version of the game was released by Piko Interactive and Bleem! for Windows via Steam on February 15, 2022.

== Gameplay ==
The player's party consists of three members, each with their own strengths and weaknesses. In battle, the player has a choice of using physical attacks, magic, items and escape. It plays the same on the field in terms of using inventory, moving about and talking to non-player characters.

Battles are random. When exploring, the growl of a monster is heard. Pressing L2 and R2 simultaneously will make Stinger "hide" on the ground and possibly avoid a battle altogether. Shadow Madness uses some elements of Square's Active Time Battle system. In particular, enemies will not wait to attack. As in Super Mario RPG, performance in battle is largely determined by the timing of button presses. The maximum level of experience a character can reach is 15. Characters can unleash powerful "summons" during battle.

Shadow Madness features 3D polygonal models on 2D pre-rendered backgrounds, with the battle scenes taking place in a fully 3D environment. The game includes CG cutscenes to further the storyline.

== Plot ==
=== Story ===
The storyline is centered on saving the world from a mysterious plague that is spreading quickly. The player takes the role as Stinger, whose town has just been destroyed. The player meets many friends and foes on their way to finding out how the chaos started and how it can be stopped.

=== Characters ===
- Stinger — When the chaos wipes out his hometown, he vows to end the chaos.
- Windleaf — Joins Stinger after her secluded sylvan village gets attacked.
- Harv-5 — A robot originally created for harvesting crops, but when the demons destroy his fields and home he sets out to find out his purpose. His catchphrase of sorts is "There will be death."
- Xero Von Moon — A Mage Warrior who has been resurrected from his deep sleep, he has no body so he floats around with just his head.
- Clemett — He is a native Gadgeteer, but he didn't agree with how they lived so he went to live with humans, and when the chaos started he vowed to protect his 'Friends'.
- Jirina — She is a proud Org-Ta and a native of the underground world known as Wyldern. Her people have been enslaved by the Darg who turned a once peaceful land into a twisted hell. She vows to get revenge.

== Development ==
Conception of Shadow Madness began with Big Rain, a small group of employees of the North American branch of Japanese developer Square, located in Redmond, Washington. Prior to the English localization of its RPG Final Fantasy VII, Square moved its operations from Redmond to Los Angeles. Square's old offices were purchased by the group, which included Ted Woolsey, a translator for Square's popular SNES RPGs including Secret of Mana, Final Fantasy VI, and Chrono Trigger. Woolsey served as Vice President of Internal Development for Big Rain and acted as a designer, executive producer, and one of several script writers for Shadow Madness. The Japanese company ASCII Entertainment signed on as the game's initial publisher while production began in earnest in mid-1997. ASCII formally announced Shadow Madness during the summer 1997 Electronic Entertainment Expo (E3) with a projected first quarter 1998 release. Development stalled when ASCII dropped the game shortly thereafter due to lack of funds. Big Rain eventually merged with the newly established Crave Entertainment, a Seattle-based company which bought the publishing rights to Shadow Madness from ASCII. Big Rain was renamed Craveyard and assigned development of all the company's future RPG releases.

Despite its overt similarities to Final Fantasy VII, Woolsey insisted that Shadow Madness was not developed as a clone of that game. As such, the developer focused heavily on crafting the game's plot in order to distinguish it from other RPGs. He claimed that the purpose of Shadow Madness was "to tell a great story" and did refer to the commercial and critical success of Final Fantasy VII as proof that players of the time were interested in darker, more mature storylines than previous Japanese RPGs that had made their way to Western territories. As such, the text in Shadow Madness was aimed more towards teenagers and young adults than towards children and was written to make players empathetic to the characters' situations. Woolsey described the game's themes as realistic, including how widespread disease and the ensuing "rumor" about such disease could affect a person's life. He stated, "It's a matter of being thrown out there, unprepared, and trying to learn about the world around you and come up with some reason for what's happened to you." Similarly, Woolsey explained how this approach to storytelling would still use the more traditional RPG paradigm of a hero's journey to obtain power and eventually defeat a malevolent force. "Part of this game is the notion that 'evil' is transmitted through ideas, through communication, and will exist at least until the idea of the 'hero' is powerful enough to supplant the idea of the 'other'."

To help present the storyline, the design team chose to develop Shadow Madness on the PlayStation because of the platform's ability to display non-interactive FMV cutscenes. Once the project started, the art team was formed to work on its FMVs and more than 800 stationary backgrounds. This team was led by art director Annabella Serra, who previously worked at Industrial Light & Magic and helped create the CGI visual effects in the film Terminator 2: Judgment Day. Artists for the game were made up of professional animators, clay modelers, and military cartographers. A separate engineering team was formed to implement the art into the game's 3D engine via a toolset. Pre-rendered content was built on Silicon Graphics workstations running the PowerAnimator (Alias) 3D graphics suite and RenderMan. Real-time 3D characters and static backgrounds were achieved using 3D Studio Max software in conjunction with the NURBS tool in PowerAnimator. For interactive portions of the game, two different graphical formats were used due to the team's financial budget and the PlayStation's limited RAM storage space. In "weeble mode" players navigate 2D backgrounds containing low-resolution 3D models. To give these backgrounds a cinematic feel, the team employed various filmmaking skills such as camera control, field-of-view manipulation, and the use of overlays for parallax effects. In "battle mode" high-resolution models exist in fully-rendered 3D environments shown with a moving camera. A large amount of the project's expense came from adjusting 3D character animation and geometry. Characters and objects were detailed with texture mapping and vertex coloring. The team took advantage of the PlayStation's unconventional .HMD format, which would allow for real-time interpolation between key frames for smooth animation and low memory use. The game's first-person perspective minigames were developed by members of Lobotomy Software, another Seattle-based studio whose previous work entailed porting PC first-person shooters to consoles and developing the Playmates Interactive original shooter PowerSlave. After being renamed Lobotomy Studios, senior staff members were integrated into Crave in 1998.

== Release ==
After being showcased at the summer 1998 E3 show, Shadow Madness was on track for a November release that year. However, it was delayed to early 1999 so that the developer could add new features and refine both the gameplay and screen text. With a projected North American launch in April, customers who preordered Shadow Madness from Electronics Boutique, Software Etc., and Babbages received a demo disc of the game. Customers who reserved the Crave-published RPG Jade Cocoon: Story of the Tamamayu through Electronics Boutique also received a demo of Shadow Madness, a rebate towards the retail version of Shadow Madness, and a cloth map of the Shadow Madness overworld. The release for Shadow Madness was pushed back to its final, North American launch date of May 25, 1999 to allow the developer to further test and amend its gameplay. The two-disc game was packaged with a separate demo disc for Jade Cocoon. Shadow Madness sold poorly. Crave Entertainment allowed Craveyard and Lobotomy to complete a European version of the game to be released by Sony Computer Entertainment before closing both studios and giving their employees the option to relocate to the parent company's new base of operations in Los Angeles.

A version of Shadow Madness for the Tiger Electronics handheld Game.com was ultimately cancelled. Prior to Craveyard's closure, a planned sequel to Shadow Madness was also in its initial conceptual phase, as announced by Woolsey. A version of the game for Windows was released on Steam by publishers Piko Interactive and Bleem! on February 15, 2022.

== Reception ==
Reception

Aggregate score
Aggregator	Score
GameRankings	65%

Review scores
Publication	Score
AllGame	2.5/5
Game Informer	6/10
GameFan	84% (G.N.) 83%
GamePro	4/5
GameRevolution	B
GameSpot	4.3/10
IGN	7/10
Next Generation	3/5
PlayStation Official Magazine – UK	6/10
Official U.S. PlayStation Magazine	2.5/5
RPGamer	6.5/10

Shadow Madness received "mixed" reviews according to video game review aggregator GameRankings. Next Generation said in an early review that the game "emulates the genre well, but does little to enhance it." Other magazines gave the game average to favorable reviews months before it was released Stateside.

Official U.S. PlayStation Magazine gave the game the award for worst character design in its 1999 Editors' Awards. GameSpot summed it up by saying, "Whoever said 'Graphics don't matter' never played Shadow Madness." X-Play placed it at number 3 on their top 5 worst role-playing games video.
