= Koto Battle: Tengai no Moribito =

2001 video game

- Developer: AlphaDream
- Publisher: AlphaDream
- Director: Chihiro Fujioka
- Producer: Tetsuo Mizuno
- Designers: Naoki Kamimura; Nozomi Kimoto; Yasuhito Yamamoto; Kazuhito Sekine
- Programmers: Takashi Yoshida; Tatsuya Sudou; Manabu Yoshida; Hirofumi Horikawa
- Composers: Hirofumi Taniguchi; Akira Takemoto; Ryuichi Sato
- Platform: Game Boy Color
- Release: JP: March 9, 2001
- Genre: Role-playing video game/Digital collectible card game
- Mode: Single-player

Koto Battle: Tengai no Moribito (コトバトル－天外の守人－) is a role-playing video game developed and published by AlphaDream for the Game Boy Color. It was released only in Japan on March 9, 2001.

== Gameplay ==
The game progresses by defeating other characters in kotodama card battles. Most battles are fought against wild monsters encountered randomly in the wilderness, or generic kotodama battlers placed throughout the game map. Certain battles cannot be avoided because they are essential to the game's story. When the player enters a battle, the right side of the screen is the player's field, and the opposite side is the enemy's field. As a kotodama battler, the player has the ability to summon up to three friendly monsters to assist in battle, each placed on the top, mid, and lower sections of the screen.

There are four options available in the battle menu; "Use kotodamas," "Kotodama history," "Defend," and "Escape." Items cannot directly be used by the player, and battles are fought out entirely through the use of kotodamas. Turns are determined by the "timecost" assigned to each type of kotodama or monster, and begin when the other side's timecost goes to zero. Kotodama battlers begin each battle with a timecost of 5, and monsters may have a timecost shorter or longer than that according to their type.

=== Using kotodamas ===
Koto Battle's battle system

The player chooses 20 kotodamas prior to battling, 4 of which randomly appear for use at the start of the battle in the form of a card. Kotodama cards already used can be viewed in the kotodama history option, and those used in each turn are replaced with others from the initial 20 kotodamas at the start of the next turn. If the player runs out of kotodamas to use, they lose the battle even if they still have health points (HP) remaining.

=== Monster cards ===
This type of card allows the player to summon the kotodama power of a monster on the battlefield. Summoned monsters shield the player from enemy attacks, and attack the enemy when the timecost reaches zero. If the players uses a monster card when the field is already filled with summoned monsters, the newly summoned monsters will take the place of the previous ones. Each summoned monster's HP is relative to the kotodama battler's level, so monsters grow stronger as the summoner's level increases. Using monster cards usually requires a greater timecost than using item or magic cards.

=== Item cards ===
In Koto Battle items cannot be used by the player during battle, but can be given to summoned monsters as weapons. Items can only be given to monsters already on the battlefield, and a player cannot summon an item first and assign it to a monster summoned afterwards. Item weapons have a variety of different effects, allowing the monster wielding it to gain greater attack power, special abilities, or directly attack the opposing kotodama battler (bypassing summoned monsters). Some may have adverse effects as well. For instance, a weapon may increase the attack range of the monster but decrease its attack power, or may damage all units on the field, including friendly units.

=== Magic cards ===
Kotodama power can also be wielded as magic, which can be cast on both friendly and opposing units. Like monster cards, the effectiveness of magic is dependent on the level of the kotodama battler. However, magic is not powerful as an offensive force in comparison to other forms of attack, and as enemies become stronger, only the most powerful magic cards can deal out large amounts of damage to opponents. Players will mostly rely on magic to heal (regain HP).

=== Other options ===
When kotodama cards are used during battle, they are recorded in the "Kotodama history" option and cannot be used again in the same battle. The game records up to 4 past card uses, and the oldest is discarded when the player uses a new card. Each type of kotodama is represented by a specific kanji, and combining two or more of the kanjis in "Kotodama history" will create a new kotodama card. If the combined kanji happen to form an actual word, the new card that forms becomes a special combo card. Combo cards are powerful, but the regular kotodama cards must be used sparingly in order for a combo card to be created, so it becomes difficult to produce combo cards during battles against strong opponents. Kotodamas (kanjis) used in this way are discarded from the history option.

The "Escape" command allows players to avoid random encounter battles, but cannot be selected in battles against kotodama battlers. The player loses the oldest record in their kotodama history when they make a successful escape.

== Plot ==
The game is set in a world containing a mysterious power known as kotodama (コトダマ). Long ago, the ki (spiritual energy) element kotodama awoke in the country of Tengai (テンガイのくに, Tengai no Kuni), wreaking havoc and destruction upon the world. However, five other kotodama elements join forces to seal away the ki kotodama, saving the world from destruction. The remaining elements spread throughout the world, and miko (shaman women) continued to protect the land using the ten (天; heaven) kotodama. The player takes the role of a kotodama battler in training who is the younger brother of a shaman woman. He holds the power of the hito (人; person) kotodama, and seeks to become a moribito (守人; defender); the group of kotodama battlers whose job is to protect the shamans.

== Reception ==
On release, Famitsu magazine scored the game a 31 out of 40.
