= Fray in Magical Adventure =

1990 video game

- MSX2 cover art by Masato Kanamono
- Developer(s): Microcabin
- Publisher(s): Microcabin
- Director(s): Yasuhiko Nakatsu
- Designer(s): Yasuhiko Nakatsu; Hitoshi Suenaga; Hideyuki Yanagishima
- Programmer(s): Yasuhiko Nakatsu
- Artist(s): Hitoshi Suenaga; Yasuhiro Jinnai; Etsuko Taniguchi
- Writer(s): Yasuhiko Nakatsu
- Composer(s): Ryuji Sasai; Tadahiro Nitta
- Platform(s): MSX Turbo R, MSX2, PC-98, PC Engine, Game Gear
- Release: 1990-1994
- Genre(s): Action RPG
- Mode(s): Single-player

Fray in Magical Adventure, also known as just Fray (フレイ) and Fray-Xak Epilogue (Gaiden), is a 1990 spin-off "gaiden" (sidestory) game in a role-playing video game series Xak developed and published by the Japanese software developer Microcabin. Even though it is directly connected to the more serious Xak storyline, Fray has a less serious tone and light-hearted comedic approach to telling the story. It was originally released for the MSX2 and was later ported to several different systems, among them MSX Turbo R, PC-98, PC Engine (as Fray CD), and Game Gear.

== Gameplay ==
Fray is a simple action RPG. The game proceeds by the player's character Fray fighting through a preset overhead view map shooting opposing monsters, jumping over obstacles, and locating powerups and Gold, the game's currency, along the way. At the end of each stage the player will fight a boss and enter a town or safe haven where the player can purchase new equipment, hit points and the option to save their progress. Fray advances in power through the items that she can equip such as different rods and shields. Battles are in real-time as Fray walks around on automatic vertically scrolling game map as well as the monster characters. She has an attack and defense rating, and can switch between different projectile weapon styles as well as use special attacks and healing items.

== Plot ==
Fray features a high fantasy setting where a great war was fought between the benevolent but weakening ancient gods and a demon race, which led to the collapse and eventual mortality of the gods. After this 'War of Sealing', the gods divided the world into three parts: Xak, the world of humans, Oceanity, the world of faeries, and Zekisis, the world of demons. The demon world of Zekisis was tightly sealed from the other two worlds to prevent reentry of the warmongering demon race. Some demons were left behind in Xak, however, and others managed to discover a separate means to enter Xak from Zekisis anyway. This ancient history is displayed in the introduction of Xak II: Rising of the Redmoon.

The story of Fray takes place between the events of Xak and during the events of Xak II. During Xak, Fray was not able to use magic and was more or less a helpless girl that was rescued by the hero of the Xak series, Latok Kart. After being rescued, Fray becomes romantically interested in Latok and decides that if she could become useful to Latok and aid him in his quests, perhaps Latok will be interested in her romantically in return. Starting from the very end of Xak, Fray goes attends a magical university for three years to learn how to become a full-fledged sorceress. Upon her graduation Fray travels to Latok's home town of Fearless to find Latok, but upon arriving Fray learns that Latok has decided to journey on ahead of her to the region of Banuwa to start a new quest (Xak II). Fray decides to not give up on finding Latok and decides to set out on an adventure all on her own as she heads for Banuwa village. The course of the game takes Fray to several places along the way including various villages, an ancient ruins, a lake, the center of a volcano, and a floating fortress.

== Release ==
Fray was originally released for the MSX on December 6, 1990. Later, other versions were developed for the MSX Turbo R, PC-98, PC Engine, and Game Gear in 1991–1994. An extended version of Fray in Magical Adventure was released with the MSX2 version for the MSX Turbo R, commonly referred to as Fray Turbo R, has voice acting and an alternate opening animation sequence. Another enhanced remake for the PC Engine titled Fray CD was later released by Microcabin. There are several differences between Fray CD and the original Fray in Magical Adventure in that Fray CD has an alternate FMV opening animation sequence, an additional stage, some different bosses and a plot that deviates from the original game mostly near the end of the game.

The MSX2 version has been unofficially translated into English by Oasis. Project EGG re-released the PC-9801, PC Engine and MSX2 Windows 8.1 compatible versions in 2009–2014.

== Reception ==
Fray was well received, including by Japanese MSX Magazine. The MSX versions have been a bestseller in Japan for a long time and the MSX turbo R version was rated as "very good" by Spanish magazine MSX Club. German magazine Video Games highlighted the PC Engine CD version of the game alongside Sylphia and Strip Fighter 2 as Japanese import titles. They said that the game has a lot of characters who will give hints on where to go next, but this could be problematic to people who don't know Japanese.

In 2012, Fray CD re-release was given a positive review from Gamer which praised its "excellent" voice acting and funny writing.
