= Final Fantasy Legend III =

1991 video game

- North American Game Boy box art
- Developer: Square (Note: Nintendo DS remake developed by Racjin. Nintendo Switch port developed by Square Enix.)
- Publishers: Game Boy; Square; Nintendo DS, Switch; Square Enix
- Director: Kouji Ide
- Producer: Chihiro Fujioka
- Designers: Masanori Morita; Hideshi Kyonen
- Programmer: Takeo Fujii
- Artist: Katsutoshi Fujioka
- Composers: Ryuji Sasai; Chihiro Fujioka
- Series: SaGa (Note: Rebranded in the West under the Final Fantasy moniker.)
- Platforms: Game Boy, Nintendo DS, Nintendo Switch, Android, iOS, Windows
- Release: December 13, 1991: Game Boy; JP: December 13, 1991; NA: August 1993 Nintendo DS; JP: January 6, 2011 (Remake) Switch; WW: December 19, 2020 Android, iOS; WW: September 22, 2021 Windows; WW: October 21, 2021
- Genre: Role-playing
- Mode: Single-player

Final Fantasy Legend III, known in Japan as SaGa 3: Jikuu no Hasha, (Note: Jikū no Hasha ~ Sa·Ga 3 [Kanketsu Hen] (Japanese: 時空(じくう)の覇者(はしゃ) サ・ガ3 [完結編]; lit. The Ruler of Time and Space ~ SaGa3 [Final Chapter])) is a role-playing video game developed and published by Square for the Game Boy. The third entry in the SaGa series, it was released in Japan in 1991 and in North America in 1993. A remake for the Nintendo DS was released in 2011 by Square Enix, remaining exclusive to Japan. The Game Boy version was later ported to the Nintendo Switch and released worldwide by Square Enix in 2020, with later ports to Android, iOS and Microsoft Windows in 2021.

The game's narrative follows a group of warriors as they fight a god-like being in the past, present, and future. During gameplay, players explore the different time periods, fighting in turn-based battles and raising character power through a combination of experience points, skill leveling, and material-based character classes.

Production began in 1990 in parallel with the development of Romancing SaGa for the Super Famicom. Series creator Akitoshi Kawazu did not take part in the original production due to his work on Romancing SaGa, and development was instead handled by Square's newly-established Osaka studio. It was the final SaGa title developed for the Game Boy. Upon release, the game saw praise from Japanese and Western critics, with praise going to its graphics and narrative. As of 2002, the game had sold around 650,000 in Japan. It was the last Western SaGa release until SaGa Frontier for the PlayStation in 1998.

== Gameplay ==
Battles from the Game Boy original (top) and the Nintendo DS remake (bottom).

Final Fantasy Legend III, known in Japan as SaGa 3: Jikuu no Hasha, is a role-playing video game set in a science fiction-based world where players take on the role of a four-person party as they travel between environments in different time periods. The party explores different environments from a top-down perspective, talking with characters to advance the narrative, using shops to buy and sell items and equipment, and entering battles during exploration. Players choose their basic characters from two different races, humans and mutants, who have different ways they can raise their experience levels. Travel between eras is carried out using the airship Talon, which is upgraded during the campaign to reach new areas.

Battles play out using a turn-based combat system, where party members attack enemies using their equipped weapons or magic spells. Humans raise their level using experience points in battle, while mutants raise their attributes and skills based on usage in battles. Humans and mutants can evolve into monster or robot character classes using items gained from enemies; meat triggers evolution into beasts, then monsters, while mechanical parts transform characters into cyborgs, then robots. Characters are further customized by equipping magic stones, gaining access to new abilities. Dying in battle forces the player to reload a previous saved game.

The Nintendo DS remake retains the original story, but removes the experience point-based leveling while incorporating mechanics established in earlier and later SaGa titles. These include skill learning and statistic leveling based on player actions in battles, nonlinear storytelling and exploration through the "Free Scenario System", and upgrades to the party's ship. The graphics were also changed, shifting from 2D top-down to an angled 3D presentation. A new mechanic is "Time Gear", a special ability which stops time in field environments, freezing enemies and disrupting environmental effects which can halt the party.

== Synopsis ==
In the world of SaGa 3, a non-sentient being called the Water Entity is engulfing the world in a great flood. The Water Entity also summons monsters onto the land and low lying cities are abandoned. As a party of four warriors sets out to confront the entity, several youths from the future arrive to help, and it is realized that the Entity's destruction is occurring across all time periods. To stop the Entity, the party collects parts for the Talon, a ship capable of travelling between time periods and dimensions, hoping to foil the Entity. They learn that the Water Entity was created by the dimensional realm of Pureland, who once waged a war so destructive that it threatened multiple dimensions. The god Sol, creator of the Talon, sealed the ravaged Pureland away and scattered the Talon across time periods to prevent its use. The Water Entity was manifested as an act of vengeance from Pureland's primal water deity Xagor. After breaking into Pureland, the original Talon is destroyed and must be rebuilt, with the party redubbing it Talon2. While exploring Pureland, the party encounter Sol, who now houses the soul of Xagor, and are forced to kill both. In his last act, Sol destroys the Water Entity and the party escape back to their own dimension, destroying the Talon2 in the process.

== Development ==
Production began in 1990, following the completion of the previous game. At the time, developer Square had started production on two parallel projects; the third Game Boy SaGa title, and a Super Famicom entry titled Romancing SaGa begun at the request of the console's manufacturer Nintendo. Series creator Akitoshi Kawazu was completely occupied with developing Romancing SaGa, making Final Fantasy Legend III the only series title he was not involved in. Production was given by Kawazu to a newly-founded Square studio in Osaka, with Chihiro Fujioka producing the game. The world used design elements and motifs from science fiction, traditional fantasy, and referenced Norse mythology. The design of the Talon, called the Stethros in Japanese, was based on the Lockheed F-117 Nighthawk stealth fighter. The game's title included the term "Final Chapter", as Kawazu was at the time intending to end the SaGa series and brand. These plans changed and the SaGa series continued, leaving Kawazu confused in retrospect about his choice of the title.

Fujioka noted that in addition to creating the game, the team were also establishing themselves as a department, and as a result a great deal of effort was put into the production. They decided to overcome the Game Boy's limitations by leaving some aspects to the player's imagination instead. In the case of graphics, this meant establishing first an object, then its shadows, allowing the player to visualize the missing colors themselves; a similar concept was applied to the game's music to overcome the limitation of working with only three notes for composition. In contrast to the previous SaGa titles which used non-standard leveling mechanics, Final Fantasy Legend III used traditional leveling alongside character growth elements from earlier titles. The Japanese cover art was created by Katsutoshi Fujioka, who designed covers for the previous SaGa releases.

=== Music ===
The game's music was co-composed by Ryuji Sasai and Fujioka. The two had worked together before Fujioka joined Square, so he brought on Sasai to compose the soundtrack. As Fujioka worked on the game's programming, Sasai stated he would handle the game's music; though a musician himself, Fujioka opted to contribute four additional songs to the game. As the game was trying new elements, the composers sought to do the same. To this end, they used four sound channels, and created a stereo sound element that could both be fed through the console's single speaker and work on headphones. Sasai compared the limitations with the audio to a guitar capable of only six tones, though the cartridge capacity for the Game Boy at the time provided some difficulty. As a result, they concentrated on smaller songs, reducing the length of the tracks until they felt the music gave the proper impression.

A compilation album featuring music from the three Game Boy SaGa titles, All Sounds of SaGa, was published in 1991 by NTT Publishing. The music was released in a soundtrack album in 2018 alongside music from the original SaGa and SaGa 2.

== Release ==
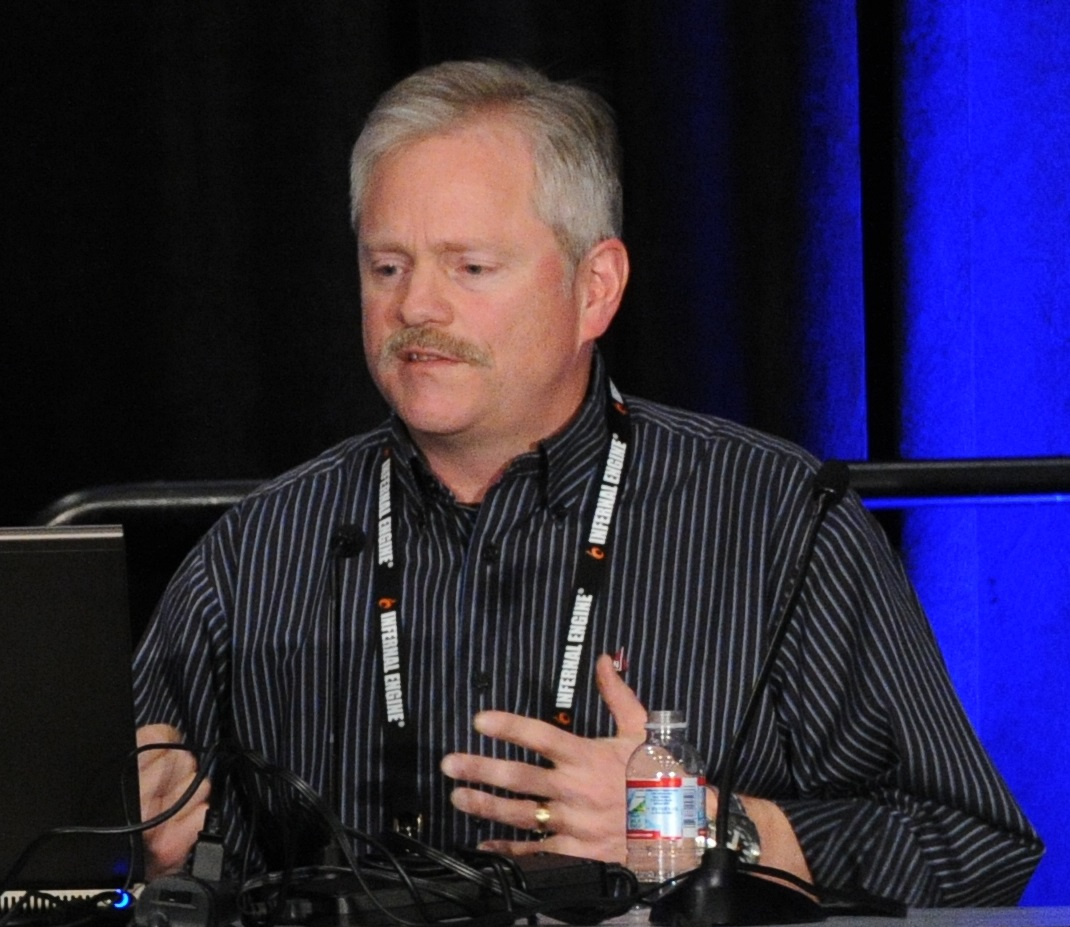
Final Fantasy Legend III was the first Square project handled by translator Ted Woolsey.

The game was released under its SaGa 3 title by Square in Japan on December 13, 1991. Two guidebooks were published by NTT Publishing in December 1991 and January 1992. In North America, the game was released by Square in August 1993. As with the first two SaGa games, Square rebranded the game under the Final Fantasy moniker in English territories, capitalizing on the recognized brand to grow its regional presence. The English translation was the first project of translator Ted Woolsey at Square. He was given the Final Fantasy IV translation as an example and instructed to ensure "there were no 'repeats' of that mess". It was the last SaGa title for the Game Boy, and the last SaGa title to receive a Western release until SaGa Frontier for the PlayStation in 1998. Sunsoft re-released the game in April 1998, alongside the other two SaGa titles for the Game Boy and Final Fantasy Adventure.

In 2020, the Game Boy original was re-released alongside the other Game Boy SaGa titles for the Nintendo Switch to celebrate the 30th anniversary of the SaGa series. The collection was published worldwide by Square Enix on December 19 under the title Collection of SaGa: Final Fantasy Legend. (Note: Known in Japan as The Saga Collection (サ・ガ コレクション, Saga Korekushon).) It was a digital exclusive release, and included English and Japanese text options worldwide. Production began at Square Enix so players could enjoy the original SaGa trilogy on modern hardware. While Kawazu had earlier plans to bring the originals onto newer hardware, the series' 30th anniversary provided a good opportunity to fulfil his wish. The port included color and resolution options, higher speed options during gameplay, control options that emulated the Game Boy console, a commemorative track created by Ito, and new artwork by Fujioka. The minor adjustments were done to reflect modern gaming tastes, but otherwise the games were unaltered. While the titles were rebranded as part of the SaGa series, their original Final Fantasy branding was retained as a subtitle to avoid undue confusion for original players. This edition was the first time the Game Boy titles released in Europe. This version was released for Android and iOS on September 22, 2021, and later for Microsoft Windows through Steam on October 21.

=== Nintendo DS remake ===
A remake for the Nintendo DS titled SaGa 3 Jikū no Hasha: Shadow or Light (Note: (サガ3時空の覇者 Shadow or Light; lit. SaGa3 The Ruler of Time and Space ~ Shadow or Light)) was announced in September 2010. It featured many staff members from the remake of the second SaGa game, including producer Hiroyuki Miura, and character designer Gen Kobayashi. Sasai returned to work on the music alongside Ito. Production began following completion of the SaGa 2 remake, with the team using experience from that production and applying it to remaking the third SaGa title. As with SaGa 2, the game was developed by Racjin under the supervision of Square Enix. With the remake, Kawazu wanted to redesign the gameplay and scenario to be more in line with other entries in the SaGa series. He also wanted to incorporate mechanics new to the SaGa series, resulting in far more changes being made than to the SaGa 2 remake. This mechanic, the Time Gear, allowed the team to further incorporate the time travel elements into the whole experience. The remake was released on January 6, 2011. A soundtrack album, which included a remix of the main theme as a bonus track, was released in Japan on January 12, six days after the game's release. Like the DS remake of SaGa 2, the SaGa 3 remake remains exclusive to Japan, though a fan translation was developed. Kawazu attributed the lack of localization to uncertainty within Square Enix as to whether the West would accept such an unconventional title.

== Reception ==
Reception

Aggregate score
Aggregator	Score	
Aggregator	DS	Game Boy
GameRankings		71%

Review scores
Publication	Score	
Publication	DS	Game Boy
Electronic Gaming Monthly		8/10, 8/10, 8/10, 8/10
Famitsu	32/40	8/10, 7/10, 7/10, 7/10
IGN		7/10
Nintendo Life		7/10
RPGamer	4/5	

Awards
Publication	Award
Pocket Games	8th Best Game Boy Game
Electronic Gaming Monthly	Editor's Choice Gold Award

=== Sales ===
In Japan, SaGa 3 topped the Famitsu sales charts from December 1991 to January 1992. As of 2002, the game had sold 650,000 units, making it the third best-selling title of the Game Boy SaGa releases, and the lowest-selling original SaGa title as of that time. The DS remake debuted in eighth place in Japanese sales charts, with opening sales of over 27,300 units. By the end of the year, the title had sold just over 59,000 units.

=== Reviews ===
The Western Game Boy release of Final Fantasy Legend III received mostly positive reviews, maintaining a 71% aggregate score on GameRankings. The Collection of SaGa version earned a score of 70 out of 100 on Metacritic based on 14 critic reviews.

In their review of the original game, Japanese gaming magazine Famitsu noted the user-friendly alterations, but one critic felt that it was notably dissimilar from earlier SaGa titles. Electronic Gaming Monthly lauded it as a good quality RPG, citing the game's graphics and story as its high points, giving it four reviewer scores of 8 out of 10 and an Editor's Choice Gold Award. Nintendo Power largely agreed with these sentiments, stating that the game had "excellent game depth and good graphics for a Game Boy RPG", but found the title's story and gameplay to be too similar to previous Final Fantasy Legend games.

IGN called attention to the game's dated graphics and faulted the soundtrack, yet still found the game's music to be better than most Game Boy titles. They additionally found fault with the game's equipment screen due to obtuse design and poor image quality, though declared it to be accessible even to novice players. GamePro applauded the game for the battle simulator feature, the ability to transform the character using parts of slain enemies, and the booklets and map included in the game box; they made special note of the time travel mechanic, praising the feeling of fighting enemies in the past after seeing them in later periods. Corbie Dillard of Nintendo Life, writing in a 2009 retrospective review, called it a fitting conclusion to the Game Boy SaGa trilogy, though he noted some continued irritating elements in gameplay and design from earlier titles.

GameDaily named it alongside the related Game Boy Final Fantasy titles as definitive games for the system, describing it as providing "hours of role-playing excitement". The sentiment was shared by gaming magazines Electronic Gaming Monthly and Pocket Games, the latter of which ranked the titles together 8th out of the Top 50 games for the Game Boy.

Reviewing the DS remake, Famitsu praised the continued innovation of class evolution, noted its fast-paced narrative, and lauded the new Time Gear mechanic. Michael Baker of RPGamer praised the improved mechanics and further polish from the SaGa 2 remake, though felt that the plot was still lacking. In their own review of the Collection of SaGa compilation, Jordan Rudek Nintendo World Report called the third game a good place to start for beginners due to its stronger narrative and more traditional gameplay design compared to other SaGa titles. Nintendo Life's Mitch Vogel felt that all three titles in Collection of SaGa were very simplistic by modern standards, with none of them having aged well compared to other titles of their time.
