= Xak: The Art of Visual Stage =

1989 video game

- Developer: Microcabin
- Publisher: Microcabin
- Composers: Ryuji Sasai; Tadahiro Nitta
- Platforms: MSX2, PC-88, PC-98, PC Engine, X68000, Super Famicom, Mobile phones, Windows,
- Release: June 1989: NEC PC-8801, NEC PC-9801; JP: June 1989 MSX2; JP: November 1989 Sharp X68000; JP: April 1990 PC Engine; JP: December 25, 1992 Super Famicom; JP: February 26, 1993 Windows; JP: November 11, 2001 (PC-88); JP: July 1, 2002 (MSX2); JP: May 17, 2005 (X68000); EN: February 28, 2007 (MSX2); JP: February 19, 2008 (PC-98) Mobile phones; JP: June 1, 2004
- Genre: Action role-playing game
- Mode: Single-player

Xak: The Art of Visual Stage (サーク) is a 1989 role-playing video game developed and published by Microcabin. The first game in the Xak series, it was originally released for the PC-88 computer system, with subsequent versions being developed for the PC-98, X68000, MSX2, PC Engine, Super Famicom, and mobile phones. The first four versions were re-released for Windows on the online store Project EGG. An English translation of Xak: The Art of Visual Stage was also released in 2007 on the now-defunct retro gaming service WOOMB.net, and became available on Project EGG.

== Plot ==
=== Setting and story ===
Xak: The Art of Visual Stage features a typical high fantasy setting. According to the game world's legends, a great war was fought between the benevolent but weakening ancient gods and a demon race, which led to the collapse and eventual mortality of the gods. After this 'War of Sealing', the gods divided the world into three parts: Xak, the world of humans, Oceanity, the world of faeries, and Xexis, the world of demons. The demon world of Xexis was tightly sealed from the other two worlds as to prevent reentry of the warmongering demon race. Some demons were left behind in Xak, however, and others managed to discover a separate means to enter Xak from Xexis anyway. This ancient history is displayed in the introduction of Xak II.

One of them, Badu, was a very powerful demon, able to use coercive magic to make humans do his bidding. Duel, the god of war, managed to defeat Badu and seal him away in a mountain of ice for 250 years. The god later settled in a village known as Fearless to live out the rest of his mortal life.

At the beginning of the game, Badu's prison is broken. Demons overrun parts of Xak once again. In order to stop the ravaging of his lands, the King of Wavis sends a messenger faerie to Dork Kart, a famous warrior living in the village of Fearless. Dork, however, has gone missing. The player takes on the role of Latok Kart, Dork's 16-year-old son, as he meets the messenger faerie, Pixie. Latok embarks on the King's quest to slay Badu, hoping to find his father along the way.

In his travels, Latok is guided by Duel's spirit. Over the course of the game, it turns out that Dork and thus Latok is a descendant of Duel.

== Releases ==
The initial versions of Xak: The Art of Visual Stage were released for NEC's PC-88 and PC-98 systems in June 1989. These were then followed by graphically distinct releases for the MSX2 (November 1989) and X68000 (April 1990). In 1992, the game was released for the PC Engine along with its sequel, Xak II: Rising of the Redmoon, in the one-disc compilation Xak I & II. Ported by Riot, the game features animated cut scenes and requires the Super System Card update if played on the PC Engine's original CD-ROM add-on. Another console port was published by Sunsoft for the Super Famicom in February 1993. The latest visually enhanced remake was developed for Japanese mobile phones and became available on Vodafone live! on June 1, 2004. The game was the first release in Bandai's "RPG Empire" line of role-playing games.

During 2001–2008, the PC-8801, MSX2, X68000, and PC-9801 versions of The Art of Visual Stage were made downloadable for Microsoft Windows through D4 Enterprise's Project EGG online service. The first official English translation of the game was also released on Dutch MSX games distributor WOOMB.net in early 2007. Although the website was shut down in 2008, its content is being transferred to the English counterpart of Project EGG.

== Music ==
The musical score of Xak: The Art of Visual Stage was composed by Ryuji Sasai and Tadahiro Nitta, marking the first collaboration between the two musicians. The game's soundtrack comprises 42 tracks and was released on May 5, 1989 under the title All Sounds of Xak: The Art of Visual Stage. From 2007 through 2008, music from the game's PC-8801, MSX2, and X68000 versions was added to the catalog of D4 Enterprise's video game music service EGG Music. The site offers both a PSG and an FM variation for most of the MSX2 tracks. The use of an FM sound source is most extensive in the music of the X68000 game.

== Reception ==
Reception

Review scores
Publication	Score
Famitsu	7/10, 4/10, 6/10, 5/10 (SFC)
The Super Famicom	62/100 (SFC)

Praised for its storyline and music, Xak: The Art of Visual Stage has been referred to as Micro Cabin's breakthrough title. The website of Famitsū magazine described the game's story as "magnificent". Jayson Napolitano of Original Sound Version stated that its music was a great stuff for fans of that distinct sound from the late 80s. The audio of The Art of Visual Stage has been regarded as being of higher quality than that of most games of the time. It has also been noted for its use of a visual representation system which gave an impression of depth and three-dimensionality.
