= Xak II: Rising of the Redmoon =

1990 video game

- Developer: Microcabin
- Publisher: Microcabin
- Composers: Ryuji Sasai; Tadahiro Nitta
- Platforms: FM Towns, MSX2, PC-88, PC-98, X68000, PC Engine (as Xak I & II)
- Release: 1990
- Genre: Action role-playing game
- Mode: Single-player

Xak II: Rising of the Redmoon is a 1990 role-playing video game by Microcabin. It is a direct sequel to Xak: The Art of Visual Stage. The game was released in Japan only, but due to a MSX scene that arose in Europe (predominately in the Netherlands region) some of the MSX versions of Xak received fan translations. An enhanced remake was later released for the PC Engine, together with the first game in the series Xak as Xak I & II by Telenet Japan's development team Riot.

== Setting ==
Xak II, being a direct sequel to the first game in the series, it features the same high fantasy setting as Xak. The gods' division of the world into Xak, the world of men, Oceanity, the world faeries, and Xexis, the world of demons, as referenced in Xak, is depicted in this game's introduction. In this adventure, the main hero of the Xak series, Latok Kart is exploring a vast region situated around a single central village of Banuwa.

== Story ==
In Xak, the protagonist Latok Kart fought and defeated the demon Zemu Badu. One of Badu’s minions escaped—a black-robed man known only as the Necromancer. Three years later, the Necromancer manages to contact one of his allies from the demon world of Xexis: a fearsome demon called Zamu Gospel. Following a prophecy foretold by an ancient and extremely powerful sorcerer named Amadok, the Necromancer and three other demons (referred to as the Demonlords) attempt to complete a dark ritual that will revive Zamu Gospel in the world of Xak.

The player once again controls Latok, now nineteen years old. A rumor about the whereabouts of Latok’s father, Dork, has surfaced in the village of Banuwa. Latok and his faerie companion, Pixie, travel to the village to investigate, but soon encounter Gospel’s minions.

== Gameplay ==
Xak II follows the same structure as its predecessor. The game proceeds by the player finding their way through labyrinthine maps, defeating opposing monsters on the way. In each map, puzzles have to be solved and keys, NPCs and other objects have to be found to gain entrance to the room where a boss dwells. After defeating the boss, the player can proceed towards the next map, where the structure repeats. Various sub-quests involving NPCs are present, most of them obligatory.

Combat takes place in real time. The player’s character moves around the game maps alongside enemy monsters. Each character has an attack and defense rating. The player can have Latok swing his sword by pressing an action key; if a monster is close enough, it will take damage. Monsters, in turn, damage Latok by touching him or hitting him with projectiles. This combat system requires some manual dexterity, especially during boss fights, as bosses are generally several times larger than Latok himself.

== Presentation ==
On MSX2, Xak II is displayed in a screen with a 256x212 display resolution. The game uses a scrolling display: the map scrolls as the player’s character moves to within about one-third of the screen’s edge. Due to the greater amount of memory available to the 256×212 display compared to the 512×212 mode, the game’s scrolling is noticeably smoother than in the first game.

The game’s music supports both the internal PSG sound system and the optional MSX-Music. As in most of Microcabin’s MSX productions, the PSG channels are used for the main melody and sound effects, while the MSX-Music channels provide the supporting instruments. However, the prominence of the PSG is less pronounced than in the first game.
