= List of FM Towns games =

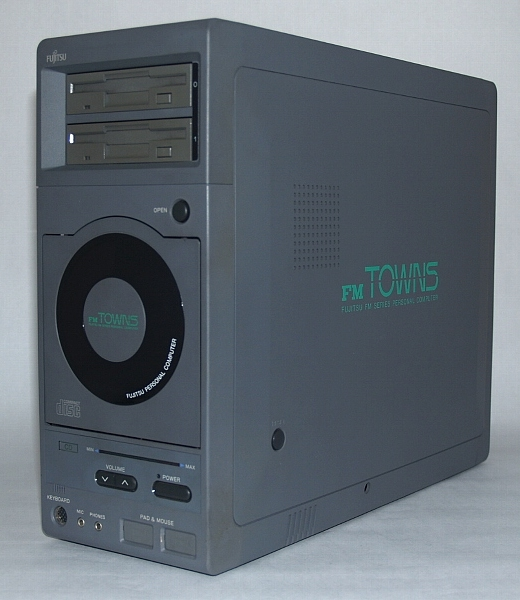
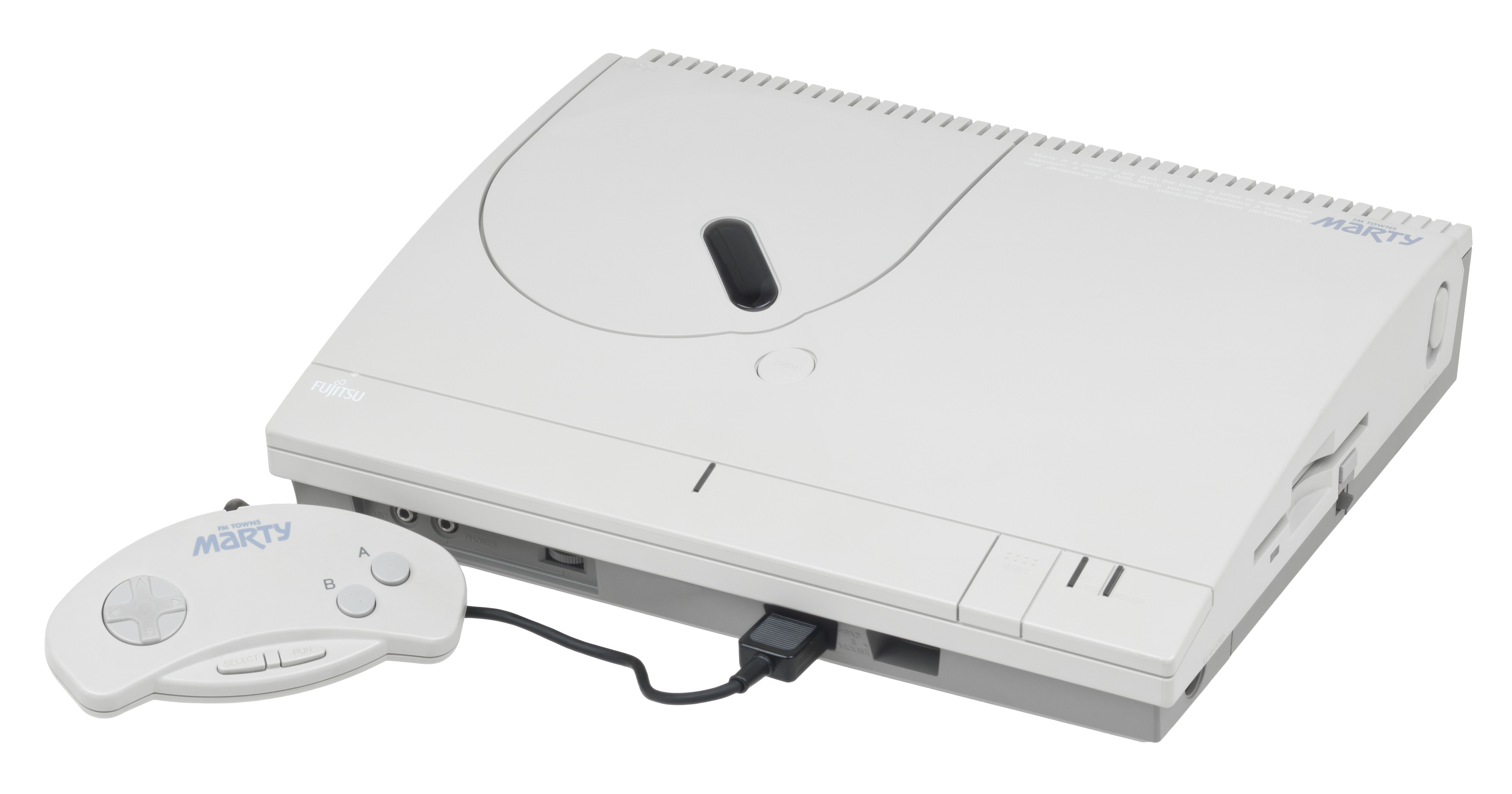
Left to right: FM Towns Model 2F and FM Towns Marty

The FM Towns is a fourth generation home computer developed and manufactured by Fujitsu, first released only in Japan on February 28, 1989. It was the fourth computer to be released under the Fujitsu brand, succeeding the FM-7 series. The following list contains all of the known games released commercially for the FM Towns platform.

Featuring an operating system based on MS-DOS called Towns OS, the FM Towns operates with both 3.5" floppy disks and CD-ROMs. Many add-ons were released including networking, SCSI, memory upgrades and CPU enhancements, among others that increased the performance of the system. A fifth-generation home video game console based on the FM Towns computer called FM Towns Marty was released exclusively for the Japanese market on 20 February 1993, featuring backward-compatibility with older FM Towns titles. Multiple revisions were later released that included several changes compared to the original model, with the last model being released in 1995 before being officially discontinued in the market in summer 1997. A total of 500,000 FM Towns units were reportedly sold during its commercial life span, while 45,000 FM Towns Marty consoles were sold as of 31 December 1993.

== Games ==
There are currently 638 games on this list. (Note: This number is always up to date by this script.)

Title	Genre(s)	Developer(s)	Publisher(s)	Release date(s)
2069 AD	Role-playing game, Visual Novel	Home Data	Home Data	1991-11
3x3 Eyes: Sanjiyan Henjō	Visual novel	Nihon Create	Nihon Create	1993-10-06
4D Boxing	Fighting, Sports	Distinctive Software	Electronic Arts Victor	1992-12
4D Driving	Racing	Distinctive Software	Electronic Arts Victor	1993-03
4D Tennis	Sports	Distinctive Software	Electronic Arts Victor	1993-07-23
38 man Kiro no Kokū	Visual novel	System Sacom	System Sacom	1989-11
a 1-2-3	Visual novel, Eroge	HARD	HARD	1993-07-16
A-Ressha de Ikō III	Business simulation game	Artdink	Artdink	1991-04
A-Ressha de Ikō IV	Business simulation game	Artdink	Artdink	1993-12
A-Ressha de Ikō IV Map Construction + Power Up Kit	Data disk, Non-game	Artdink	Artdink	1994-04
Abel: Shin Mokushiroku Taisen	Role-playing game	Family Soft	Family Soft	1995-12-22
Abunai Tengu Densetsu	Adventure, Visual Novel	Alice Soft	Alice Soft	1990-04-15
Advantage Tennis	Sports	Infogrames Europe SA	Fujitsu	1992-10
Æternam	Adventure	Infogrames Europe SA	Fujitsu	1993-03
After Burner	Combat flight simulation	CSK Research Institute Corp.	CSK Research Institute Corp.	1989-02
After Burner III	Combat flight simulation	CSK Research Institute Corp.	CSK Research Institute Corp.	1992-06
Ai Shimai: Futari no Kajitsu	Visual novel, Eroge	Silky's	Silky's	1994-09-30
Air Combat II Special	Combat flight simulation	SystemSoft	Victor Musical Industries	1993-03
Air Management: Ōzora ni Kakeru	Business simulation game	Koei	Koei	1992-09
Akiko Gold: The Queen of Adult	Visual novel, Eroge	Red-Zone	FairyTale	1995-01
Akiko Premium Version	Visual novel, Eroge	Red-Zone	FairyTale	1993
Alice no Yakata 3	Adventure, Visual novel, Eroge	Alice Soft	Alice Soft	1995-06
Alice no Yakata CD	Adventure, Visual novel, Eroge	Alice Soft	Alice Soft	1991-07
Alice no Yakata CDII	Adventure, Eroge, Visual novel	Alice Soft	Alice Soft	1992-10
Alltynex	Shoot 'em up	Satoshi Yoshida	Satoshi Yoshida	1996-10
Alone in the Dark	Survival horror	Infogrames Europe SA	Arrow Micro-Techs Corp.	1993-12-10
Alone in the Dark 2	Survival horror	Infogrames Europe SA	Arrow Micro-Techs Corp.	1994-12-03
Alshark	Role-playing game	Right Stuff	Right Stuff	1993-05-28
Amaranth III	Role-playing game	Fuga System Corp.	Fuga System Corp.	1994-11
AmbivalenZ: Niritsu Haihan	Adventure, Eroge, Visual novel	Alice Soft	Alie Soft	1994-04
America Ōdan Ultra Quiz	Quiz game	Fujitsu	Fujitsu	1994-11
Amy to Yobanaide	Adventure, Eroge, Visual novel	C's Ware	C's Ware	1995-08
Angel	Adventure, Eroge, Visual novel	Cocktail Soft	Cocktail Soft	1993-10
Angel Halo	Visual novel, Eroge	Active Software	Active Software	1996-10-17
Aoki Ōkami to Shiroki Mejika: Genchou Hishi	Strategy	Koei	Koei	1993-02
Arabesque: Shōjo-tachi no Orinasu Ai no Monogatari	Adventure, Eroge, Visual novel	FairyTale	FairyTale	1994-04-28
Arquelphos	Adventure, Eroge, Visual novel	D.O.	D.O.	1993-07-30
Asuka 120% Burning Fest	Fighting	Fill-in-Cafe	Family Soft	1994-03-11
Asuka 120% Burning Fest Excellent	Fighting	Fill-in-Cafe	Family Soft	1994-12-22
The Atlas	Simulation, Strategy	Artdink	Artdink	1991-10
The Atlas II	Simulation, Strategy	Artdink	Artdink	1993-05
Awesome	Action	Reflections Interactive	Fujitsu	1992-03
Ayayo's Live Affection	Adventure, Eroge, Visual novel	HARD	HARD	1993-02
Ayumi-chan Monogatari	Visual novel, Eroge	Alice Soft	Alice Soft	1993-10-15
Ayumi-chan Monogatari: Jisshaban	Dating Simulation, Eroge	Alice Soft, Core Magazine	Core Magazine	1995-01
Azure	Shooter	Family Soft	Family Soft	1993-02-20
Bacta 1 & 2 + Voice	Adventure, Eroge, Visual novel	Himeya Soft, Inc.	Himeya Soft, Inc.	1996-01-12
Ballade for Maria	Adventure, Eroge, Visual novel	FairyTale	FairyTale	1995-06
Band-kun	Simulation, Music	Koei	Koei	1991
Battle	Strategy	G.A.M. Corporation	G.A.M. Corporation	1992-10
Battle Chess	Chess	Interplay Productions	Fujitsu	1991-09
Beast III	Visual Novel	Birdy Soft	Birdy Soft	1994-03
Bell's Avenue Vol. 1	Visual Novel, Eroge	Signa Works	Wendy Magazine	1993-08
Bell's Avenue Vol. 2	Visual Novel, Eroge	Wendy Magazine	Wendy Magazine	1994-01
Bell's Avenue Vol. 3	Visual Novel, Eroge	Wendy Magazine	Wendy Magazine	1995-04
The Best Play Baseball	Sports	ASCII Entertainment	ASCII Entertainment	1992-04
Bible Master	Role-playing game	Glodia	Glodia	1993-12-18
Bible Master 2: The Chaos of Aglia	Role-playing game	Glodia	Glodia	1995-01
Big Honour	Sports	Artdink	Artdink	1992-09
Blandia Plus	Fighting	Ving Co., Ltd.	Ving Co., Ltd.	1994-09-30
Blue: Will to Power	Role-playing game	Kinpukurin	Kinpukurin	1992-04
Bomberman: Panic Bomber	Puzzle	Riverhillsoft	ASCII Entertainment	1995-04-05
Brandish	Action role-playing game	Nihon Falcom	Nihon Falcom	1991-12
Branmarker	Eroge, Role-playing game	D.O. Corp.	D.O. Corp.	1993-11
Branmarker 2	Eroge, Role-playing game	D.O. Corp.	D.O. Corp.	1995-10
Bubble Bobble	Platform	Ving Co., Ltd.	Ving Co., Ltd.	1990-10-31
Bunretsu Shugoshin Twinkle☆Star	Visual novel, Eroge	Studio Twinkle	Studio Twinkle	1993-07-29
Burai: Gekan Kanketsu-hen	Role-playing game	Riverhillsoft	Riverhillsoft	1991-05
Burai: Jōkan	Role-playing game	Riverhillsoft	Riverhillsoft	1990-04
Cal III	Visual Novel, Eroge	Birdy Soft	Birdy Soft	1993-07
Cal Gaiden: Tiny Steps	Visual Novel, Eroge	Birdy Soft	Birdy Soft	1993-09
Cal Towns	Visual Novel, Eroge	Birdy Soft	Birdy Soft	1992-11
California x Party: Joshidaisei Himitsu Club	Visual novel, Eroge	HOP	HOP	1994-09
Cameltry	Puzzle, Racing	Dempa	Dempa	1994-11
Can Can Bunny Extra	Visual novel, Eroge	Cocktail Soft	Cocktail Soft	1993-09
Can Can Bunny Premiere	Adventure, Eroge, Visual novel	Cocktail Soft	Ides	1992-09
The Case of the Cautious Condor	Adventure	Tiger Media, Inc.	Toshiba EMI	1989-11
Castles	Simulation, Strategy	Quicksilver Software	Victor Musical Industries	1992-10-23
Castles II: Siege and Conquest	Real-time strategy	Quicksilver Software	Victor Entertainment	1993-10
Cat's Part-1	Visual Novel, Eroge	Cat's Pro	Cat's Pro	1993-04
CD-ROM Bishoujo Collection: Yuu Disk Special	Role-playing game, Visual Novel	D.O.	Mediax	1996-04
Centurion: Defender of Rome	Action, Strategy	Bits of Magic	Electronic Arts Victor	1993-11
Chase H.Q.	Racing, Vehicular combat	Ving Co., Ltd.	Ving Co., Ltd.	1991-08-09
Chiemi & Naomi	Visual Novel, Eroge	Red-Zone	FairyTale	1993-12-22
Chinmoku no Kantai	Simulation, Strategy	G.A.M. Corporation	G.A.M. Corporation	1992
Classic Road	Sports	Victor Entertainment	Victor Entertainment	1994-02
Collector D	Role-playing game, Strategy	D.O. Corp.	D.O. Corp.	1993-08
Collector D Bangaihen	Role-playing game, Strategy	D.O. Corp.	D.O. Corp.	1993-09-10
Columns	Puzzle	Telenet Japan	Telenet Japan	1990-12
Crescent	Visual Novel, Eroge	Silky's	Silky's	1993-11
CRI Gokan Pack	Compilation	CSK Research Institute Corp.	CSK Research Institute Corp.	1994-11-25
Crystal Rinal	Dungeon crawl, Eroge, Role-playing game	D.O. Corp.	D.O. Corp.	1994-08
Curse	Adventure, Visual Novel	Queen Soft	Queen Soft	1995-02
Custom Mate & Denwa no Bell ga...	Visual Novel, Eroge	Cocktail Soft	Cocktail Soft	1994-12-16
Custom Mate 2 & Itsuka Dokoka de.	Visual Novel, Eroge	Cocktail Soft	Cocktail Soft	1995-08-25
CyberCity	Rail shooter	Telenet Japan	Telenet Japan	1989-03
Cyberia	Action-adventure	Xatrix Entertainment	Fujitsu	1995-05
D-Again: The 4th Unit Five	Adventure, Visual novel	Data West	Data West	1990-04
D-Return	Shoot 'em up	Nihon Computer Club Renmei Kikaku	Nihon Computer Club Renmei Kikaku	1990-11
D.P.S: Dream Program System	Visual Novel, Eroge	Alice Soft	Alice Soft	1990-04-15
D.P.S: Dream Program System SG	Visual Novel, Eroge	Alice Soft	Alice Soft	1990-09-15
D.P.S: Dream Program System SG Set 2	Visual Novel, Eroge	Alice Soft	Alice Soft	1991-04-15
D.P.S: Dream Program System SG Set 3	Visual Novel, Eroge	Alice Soft	Alice Soft	1991-12-15
D.P.S. Zenbu	Visual Novel, Eroge	Alice Soft	Alice Soft	1995-11
Daikōkai Jidai	Role-playing game, Simulation	Koei	Koei	1990-11
Daikōkai Jidai II	Role-playing game, Simulation	Koei	Koei	1993-04
Daisenryaku III '90	Turn-based strategy, Wargame	Arsys Software	SystemSoft	1991-12
Daisenryaku III '90 Map Collection Vol. 1	Turn-based strategy, Wargame	Arsys Software	SystemSoft	1992-05
Daisenryaku III '90 Map Collection Vol. 2	Turn-based strategy, Wargame	Arsys Software	SystemSoft	1992-07
Dalk	Role-playing game, Turn-based strategy, Eroge	Alice Soft	Alice Soft	1993-04
Dangel	Role-playing game, Eroge	Mink Co. Ltd.	Mink Co. Ltd.	1996-06
Darwin's Dilemma	Puzzle	Inline Design	StarCraft, Inc.	1991-08
De-Ja II	Adventure, Eroge, Visual novel	ELF Corporation	ELF Corporation	1992-08
De.FaNa	Visual novel, Eroge	Himeya Soft, Inc.	Himeya Soft, Inc.	1995-11
Dead Force	Tactical role-playing game	Fuga System Corp.	Fuga System Corp.	1995-06-09
Dead of the Brain	Adventure, Visual novel	FairyTale	FairyTale	1993-02
Death Brade	Fighting	KID	KID	1992-12
Deep	Visual novel, Eroge	JAST	JAST	1995-03-15
Demon City	Visual novel, Eroge	Cocktail Soft	Cocktail Soft	1994-03-18
Dengeki Nurse	Role-playing game, Eroge, Visual novel	Cocktail Soft	Cocktail Soft	1992
Dengeki Nurse 2: More Sexy	Role-playing game, Eroge, Visual novel	Cocktail Soft	Cocktail Soft	1994-12-22
Derby Stallion	Sports	ASCII Entertainment	ASCII Entertainment	1994-02-18
Desire: Haitoku no Rasen	Adventure, Eroge, Visual novel	C's Ware	C's Ware	1994-11
Diamond Players	Sports	Wolf Team	Wolf Team	1993-06
Die Gekirin	Role-playing game	Nihon Application Co., Ltd.	Nihon Application Co., Ltd.	1995-11
Dinosaur	Role-playing game	Nihon Falcom	Nihon Falcom	1991-10
Doki Doki Vacation: Kirameku Kisetsu no Naka de	Visual novel, Eroge	Cocktail Soft	Cocktail Soft	1995-03
Dōkyūsei	Adventure, Eroge, Visual novel	ELF Corporation	ELF Corporation	1993-03-25
Dōkyūsei 2	Adventure, Eroge, Visual novel	ELF Corporation	ELF Corporation	1995-02
DOR	Visual novel, Eroge	D.O. Corp.	D.O. Corp.	1992-05-29
DOR Best Selection Gekan	Visual novel, Eroge	D.O. Corp.	D.O. Corp.	1992-05-21
DOR Best Selection Joukan	Visual novel, Eroge	D.O. Corp.	D.O. Corp.	1993-04-27
DOR Part 2	Visual novel, Eroge	D.O. Corp.	D.O. Corp.	1992-06-26
DOR Part 3	Visual novel, Eroge	D.O. Corp.	D.O. Corp.	1992-11-27
DOR Special Edition '93	Visual novel, Eroge	D.O. Corp.	D.O. Corp.	1992-12-23
DOR Special Edition Sakigake	Visual novel, Eroge	D.O. Corp.	D.O. Corp.	1992-16
Dr. Stop!	Adventure	Alice Soft	Alice Soft	1992
Dracula Hakushaku	Visual Novel, Eroge	FairyTale	Ides	1993-03-19
Dragon Half	Role-playing game	Micro Cabin	Micro Cabin	1994-04-22
Dragon Knight 4	Eroge, Role-playing game, Turn-based strategy	ELF Corporation	ELF Corporation	1994-04-28
Dragon Knight III	Eroge, Role-playing game	ELF Corporation	ELF Corporation	1992-02
Dragon Shock	Puzzle	LOG Corporation	LOG Corporation	1989-11
Dragon Slayer: The Legend of Heroes	Role-playing game	Nihon Falcom	Nihon Falcom	1990-06-08
Dragon Slayer: The Legend of Heroes II	Role-playing game	Nihon Falcom	Nihon Falcom	1993-02
Dragons of Flame	Action role-playing game	Opera House	Pony Canyon	1992-01
Drakkhen	Role-playing game	Infogrames Entertainment SA	Fujitsu	1990-11
Dreamy: Yume Utsutsu	Visual Novel, Eroge	Megami	Megami	1994-08-25
Dual Targets: The 4th Unit Act.3	Adventure, Visual novel	Data West	Data West	1989-11
Dungeon Master	Role-playing game	FTL Games	Fujitsu	1989-11
Dungeon Master II: Skullkeep	Role-playing game	FTL Games	Victor Entertainment	1994-01
Dungeon Master: Chaos Strikes Back	Data disk, Role-playing game	FTL Games	Victor Musical Industries	1990-12
Ed Bogas' Music Machine	Non-game, Music	Software Resources International	Fujitsu	1993-11-26
Eight Lakes G.C.	Sports	T&E Soft	T&E Soft	1990-08
Eikan wa Kimi ni 2: Kōkō Yakyū Zenkoku Taikai	Sports	Artdink	Artdink	1991-08
Eikan wa Kimi ni 3: Kōkō Yakyū Zenkoku Taikai	Sports	Artdink	Artdink	1993-08
Elfish	Life simulation	AnimaTek International	Fujitsu	1994-07
Elfish Lite	Life simulation	AnimaTek International	Fujitsu	1993-11-26
Electric Device Marian	Adventure, Visual novel, Eroge	Studio Jikkenshitsu	Janis	1994-08
Elm Knight	First-person shooter	Micro Cabin	Micro Cabin	1992-11
Emerald Dragon	Role-playing game	Glodia	Glodia	1992-05
Emit Vol. 1: Toki no Maigo	Visual novel	Koei	Koei	1994-03-25
Emit Vol. 2: Inochigake no Tabi	Visual novel	Koei	Koei	1994-07-01
Emit Vol. 3: Watashi ni Sayonara o	AVisual novel	Koei	Koei	1994-09-18
Engage Errands: Miwaku no Shitotachi	Eroge, Tactical role-playing game	Ponytail Soft	Ponytail Soft	1995-04-21
Engage Errands II: Hikari o Ninau Mono	Eroge, Tactical role-playing game	Ponytail Soft	Ponytail Soft	1995-05
Etsuraku no Gakuen	Adventure, Eroge, Visual novel	C's Ware	C's Ware	1994-08
Europa Sensen	Turn-based strategy	Koei	Koei	1992-07-11
Evolution	Action	System Sacom	System Sacom	1989-03
Excellent 10	Shoot 'em up	Amorphous	Amorphous	1990-10
Eye of the Beholder II: The Legend of Darkmoon	Role-playing game	Cybelle	Arrow Micro-Techs Corp.	1993-11-19
F29 Retaliator	Combat flight simulation	Digital Image Design	Imagineer	1993-03
Final Blow	Sports	Ving Co., Ltd.	Ving Co., Ltd.	1990-03
Flashback	Platform	Delphine Software International	Victor Entertainment	1994-04-22
Flying Shark	Shoot 'em up	Ving Co., Ltd.	Ving Co., Ltd.	1993-09-23
FM Towns Super Technology Demo 1993	Demo	Fujitsu	Fujitsu	1993-11
Fractal Engine Demo	Demo	Psygnosis	Fujitsu	1992-02
Fujitsu Air Warrior	Combat flight simulation	Kesmai	Fujitsu	1992-03
Fujitsu Air Warrior V2	Combat flight simulation	Kesmai	Fujitsu	1995-04
Free Will: Knight of Argent	Role-playing game	Kinpukurin	Kinpukurin	1992-11
Fujitsu Habitat	Massively multiplayer online role-playing game	Fujitsu	Fujitsu	1990
Fukkatsusai: Asticaya no Majo	Role-playing game	Grocer	Grocer	1992-11
Fushigi no Umi no Nadia	Adventure, Visual novel	Gainax	Gainax	1993-02
Gadget: Invention, Travel, & Adventure	Adventure, Interactive movie	Synergy, Inc.	Toshiba EMI	1993-11
Gakuen Bakuretsu Tenkousei!	Adventure, Visual novel	ZyX	ZyX	1996-03-08
Gakuen Bomber	Adventure, Eroge Visual novel	Active Software	Active Software	1994-06-24
Gakuen King: Hidehiko Gakkō o Tsukuru	Adventure, Eroge, Role-playing game	Alice Soft	Alice Soft	1996-06-07
Galaxy Force II	Rail shooter	CSK Research Institute Corp.	CSK Research Institute Corp.	1991-03
Game Jang+	Puzzle	G.A.M. Corporation	G.A.M. Corporation	1993
Game Technopolis Super Collection 1	Visual Novel, Eroge	Technopolis Soft	Tokuma Shoten	1992-05
Game Technopolis Super Collection 2	Dating simulation, Eroge	Technopolis Soft	Tokuma Shoten	1993-08
Gambler Queen's Cup	Adventure, Eroge, Visual novel	Queen Soft	Queen Soft	1994-09-23
Garō Densetsu Special	Fighting	Japan Home Video	Japan Home Video	1996-09-13
Gekirin: Ushinawareshi Hōken	Role-playing game	Nihon Application Co., Ltd.	Nihon Application Co., Ltd.	1994-12-22
Gendai Daisenryaku EX Special	Turn-based strategy, Wargame	Ving Co., Ltd.	Ving Co., Ltd.	1994-09-14
Genocide^{2}: Genocide Square	Action	ZOOM Inc.	ZOOM Inc.	1993-04-28
Giga Mortion	Role-playing game, Eroge	Inter Heart	Inter Heart	1995-03
Ginga Eiyū Densetsu II DX+	Strategy	Bothtec	Bothtec	1992-05
Ginga Eiyū Densetsu III SP	Strategy	Bothtec	Bothtec	1993-12
Ginga Yuukyou Densetsu RC Tobacker	Strategy	Pony Tail	Pony Tail	1995-11
Goh II	Turn-based strategy, Wargame	Wolf Team	Wolf Team	1993-03
Gokanshi	Strategy	Tensui Software	Tensui Software	1995-07
Gokko Vol. 01: Doctor	Visual novel, Eroge	Mink Co. Ltd.	Mink Co. Ltd.	1994-11-15
Gokko Vol. 02: School Gal's	Visual novel, Eroge	Mink Co. Ltd.	Mink Co. Ltd.	1994-11-30
Gokko Vol. 03: Etcetera	Visual novel, Eroge	Mink Co. Ltd.	Mink Co. Ltd.	1994-12-15
Gokuraku Mandala	Visual novel, Eroge	FairyTale	Ides	1994-02-18
Golf Links 386 Pro	Sports	Access Software	Cybelle	1995-02
Gorby no Pipeline Daisakusen	Puzzle	Compile	Tokuma Shoten	1991-04
Gulf War Sōkōden	Combat flight simulation	Wolf Team	Wolf Team	1993-12
GunBlaze	Role-playing game, Eroge	Active Software	Active Software	1994-12-16
Gunship	Combat flight simulation	MicroProse	MicroProse	1990-08
Hacchake Ayayo-san 4: Ayayo's Live Affection	Visual Novel	Hard	Hard	1993-02
Half Moon ni Kawaru made: Ramiya Ryo no Nijiiro Tamatebako	Role-playing game, Eroge	Cocktail Soft	Cocktail Soft	1995-04-14
Hana no Kioku	Visual novel, Eroge	Foster	Foster	1995-12-22
Hana no Kioku Dai 2 Shou	Visual novel, Eroge	Foster	Foster	1997-02-14
Hana Yori Dango	Board game	Active	Active	1992-04
Hana Yori Dango 2	Board game	Active	Active	1993-04-17
Hanafuda de Pon!	Board game	Active	Active	1996-07-12
Harukanaru Augusta	Sports	T&E Soft	T&E Soft	1990-01-26
Hashiri Onna II: Running Girls	Dating Simulation, Eroge	Alice Soft	Alice Soft	1995-12
Heroes of the Lance	Action-adventure	U.S. Gold	Pony Canyon	1990-06-21
High School War	Strategy	I.S.C. Co., Ltd.	I.S.C. Co., Ltd.	1994-09
Hiōden II	Tactical role-playing game	Wolf Team	Wolf Team	1994-03
Hōma Hunter Lime Dai-1-Wa	Adventure, Visual novel	Silence	Brother Kōgyō	1993-06-10
Hōma Hunter Lime Dai-2-Wa	Adventure, Visual novel	Silence	Brother Kōgyō	1993-07-09
Hōma Hunter Lime Dai-3-Wa	Adventure, Visual novel	Silence	Brother Kōgyō	1993-08-06
Hōma Hunter Lime Dai-4-Wa	Adventure, Visual novel	Silence	Brother Kōgyō	1993-09-10
Hōma Hunter Lime Dai-5-Wa	Adventure, Visual novel	Silence	Brother Kōgyō	1993-10-09
Hōma Hunter Lime Dai-6-Wa	Adventure, Visual novel	Silence	Brother Kōgyō	1993-11-10
Hōma Hunter Lime Dai-7-Wa	Adventure, Visual novel	Silence	Brother Kōgyō	1993-12-10
Hōma Hunter Lime Dai-8-Wa	Adventure, Visual novel	Silence	Brother Kōgyō	1994-01-10
Hōma Hunter Lime Dai-9-Wa	Adventure, Visual novel	Silence	Brother Kōgyō	1994-02-10
Hōma Hunter Lime Dai-10-Wa	Adventure, Visual novel	Silence	Brother Kōgyō	1994-03-10
Hōma Hunter Lime Dai-11-Wa	Adventure, Visual novel	Silence	Brother Kōgyō	1994-04-11
Hōma Hunter Lime Dai-12-Wa	Adventure, Visual novel	Silence	Brother Kōgyō	1994-05-20
Hometown, U.S.A.	Edutainment	Manley & Associates	Fujitsu	1990-03
The Horde	Action, Strategy	Crystal Dynamics	Arrow Micro-Techs Corp.	1995-04-28
Hoshi no Suna Monogatari	Adventure, Eroge, Visual novel	D.O. Corp.	D.O. Corp.	1992-10
Hoshi no Suna Monogatari 2	Adventure, Eroge, Visual novel	D.O. Corp.	D.O. Corp.	1992-09
Hoshi no Suna Monogatari 3	Adventure, Eroge, Visual novel	D.O. Corp.	D.O. Corp.	1995
Idol Project	Role-playing game	KSS	KSS	1995-07
If	Visual Novel, Eroge	Active Software	Active Software	1993-06-19
If 1・2・3 CD Collection	Compilation	Active Software	Active Software	1996-04-19
If 2	Visual Novel, Eroge	Active Software	Active Software	1993-11-19
If 3	Visual Novel, Eroge	Active Software	Active Software	1995-04-15
Igo II	Board game	ASCII Entertainment	ASCII Entertainment	1989-09
Ikazuchi no Senshi Raidi	Dungeon crawl, Eroge, Role-playing game	ZyX	ZyX	1994-10-07
Ikazuchi no Senshi Raidi 2	Dungeon crawl, Eroge, Role-playing game	ZyX	ZyX	1996-03-22
Illusion City (Genei Toshi)	Role-playing game	Micro Cabin	Takeru Software	1993-05
image	Adventure, Visual Novel	Software House Parsley	Software House Parsley	1994-05-13
image 2	Adventure, Visual Novel	Software House Parsley	Software House Parsley	1994-06-24
Image Fight	Shoot 'em up	Ving Co., Ltd.	Ving Co., Ltd.	1990-11
The Incredible Machine	Puzzle	Jeff Tunnell Productions	Cybelle	1994-04-08
Indiana Jones and the Fate of Atlantis	Adventure	LucasArts	Victor Entertainment	1993-08-27
Indiana Jones and the Last Crusade: The Graphic Adventure	Adventure	Lucasfilm Games	Fujitsu	1990-07
Infestation	First-person shooter	Psygnosis	Cross Media Soft	1992-03
Inindo: Datou Nobunaga	Role-playing game	Koei	Koei	1992-02
Injū Gakuen: La★Blue Girl	Adventure, Eroge, Visual novel	Dez Climax	Dez Climax	1994-07
Iris Tei Serenade	Visual Novel, Eroge	Agumix	Agumix	1992-12-16
Irium	Dungeon crawl, Eroge, Role-playing game	Orange House	Orange House	1993-06
Ishidō: The Way of Stones	Puzzle	Publishing International	Fujitsu	1990-06
Ishin no Arashi	Simulation, Turn-based strategy	Koei	Koei	1990-03
Jan Jaka Jan	Adventure, Board game, Eroge	ELF Corporation	ELF Corporation	1993-01
Jangō 4	Board game	Victor Entertainment	Victor Entertainment	1994-11
Jankirō	Adventure, Board game, Eroge	Red-Zone	FairyTale	1994-06
Japan Professional Football League 1994	Sports	Victor Entertainment	Victor Entertainment	1994-09
Jealousy	Visual Novel, Eroge	Inter Heart	Inter Heart	1995-07
Jinmon Yūgi	Visual Novel, Eroge	Red-Zone	FairyTale	1995-08
Joker Towns	Adventure, Visual Novel, Eroge	Birdy Soft	Birdy Soft	1992-07
Joshi Kousei Shoujo Hatsunetsu	Dating simulation	Byakuya-Shobo	Byakuya-Shobo	1993-12
Joshikō Seifuku Monogatari	Dating simulation, Eroge	KSS	KSS	1995-04
Joshua	Simulation, Turn-based strategy, Wargame	Panther Software	Panther Software	1992-11
JYB	Adventure, Eroge	Cocktail Soft	Cocktail Soft	1993-04
Kamigami no Daichi: Kojiki Gaiden	Role-playing game	Koei	Koei	1993
Kawarazaki ke no Ichizoku	Visual Novel, Eroge	Silky's	Silky's	1993-12
Kero Kero Keroppi to Origami no Tabibito	Edutainment	Mizuki	Fujitsu	1995-07
Kid Pix	Edutainment	Broderbund	Fujitsu	1992-08
Kid Pix Companion	Edutainment	Broderbund	Fujitsu	1995-03
Kid Pix Jr.	Edutainment	Broderbund	Fujitsu	1993-03
Kigen: Kagayaki no Hasha	Role-playing game	Riverhillsoft	Riverhillsoft	1992-05-29
Kikō Shidan	Simulation, Turn-based strategy, Wargame	Artdink	Artdink	1990-12
Kikō Shidan II	Simulation, Turn-based strategy, Wargame	Artdink	Artdink	1993
Kindan no Ketsuzoku	Visual novel, Eroge	C's Ware	C's Ware	1994-06-17
King's Bounty	Role-playing game, Turn-based strategy	New World Computing	StarCraft, Inc.	1994-07
King's Quest V: Absence Makes the Heart Go Yonder!	Adventure	Sierra On-Line	Sierra On-Line	1991-08
Kiwame	Board game	LOG Corporation	LOG Corporation	1992-10
Kiwame II	Board game	LOG Corporation	LOG Corporation	1994-06
Koko wa Rakuenso	Visual novel, Eroge	Foster	Foster	1996-03-01
Koko wa Rakuenso 2	Visual novel, Eroge	Foster	Foster	1996-04
Kounai Shasei Vol.1: Yonimo H na Monogatari	Visual novel, Eroge	Fairytale	Kirara	1991-07-26
Kōsoku Chōjin	Action, Visual novel, Eroge	Foster	Foster	1996-08-13
Kōryūki	Turn-based strategy	Koei	Koei	1993
Ku2++	Shoot 'em up	Panther Software	Panther Software	1993-11
Kusuriyubi no Kyōkasho	Visual novel, Eroge	Active Software	Active Software	1996-04-05
Kyan Kyan Collection	Cards, Eroge	I-cell	I-cell	1989-12
Kyouko no Ijiwaru!!	Visual novel	Pony Tail	Pony Tail	1994-11-25
Kyrandia II: The Hand of Fate	Adventure	StarCraft, Inc.	StarCraft, Inc.	1995-10
Kyūkyoku Tiger	Shoot 'em up	Ving Co., Ltd.	Ving Co., Ltd.	1994-02-10
L Elle	Visual novel, Eroge	ELF Corporation	ELF Corporation	1991-11
L'Empereur	Strategy	Koei	Koei	1991-01
Lam-Mal	Visual novel, Eroge	Fairytale	IDES	1992-04-24
Lands of Lore: The Throne of Chaos	Role-playing game	StarCraft, Inc.	StarCraft, Inc.	1995-01
Last Armageddon	Role-playing game	Apros	Brain Grey	1989-07
Last Armageddon: CD Special	Role-playing game	Apros	Brain Grey	1989-07
Last Survivor	Third-person shooters	CSK Research Institute Corp.	CSK Research Institute Corp.	1990-11-16
Leading Company	Construction and management simulation, Strategy	Koei	Koei	1992-04
The Legend of Kyrandia: Fables and Fiends	Adventure	StarCraft, Inc.	StarCraft, Inc.	1993-10
Legends of Valour	Role-playing game	Ving Co., Ltd.	Ving Co., Ltd.	1994-03-10
Lemmings	Puzzle	4000Do Inc.	Imagineer	1992-04
Lemmings 2: The Tribes	Puzzle	DMA Design	Fujitsu	1994-06-10
Lemon Cocktail Collection	Visual Novel	Cocktail Soft	Cocktail Soft	1993-03-26
Lesser Mern	Role-playing game	Panther Software	Panther Software	1992-10
Libble Rabble	Puzzle	Dempa	Dempa	1994-03
Libido 7	Visual Novel, Eroge	Libido	Libido	1994-07
Life & Death	Life simulation	Ving Co., Ltd.	Ving Co., Ltd.	1992-01
Life & Death II: The Brain	Life simulation	Ving Co., Ltd.	Ving Co., Ltd.	1992-11-27
Linkage: The 4th Unit 1・2 Towns	Adventure, Visual novel	Data West	Data West	1989-07
Lipstick Adventure 3	Adventure, Eroge, Visual novel	FairyTale	Ides	1993-05
Little Big Adventure	Action, Adventure	Adeline Software International	Electronic Arts Victor	1995-12
Loom	Adventure	Lucasfilm Games	Fujitsu	1991-04
Loop Eraser	Puzzle	Nihon Computer Club Renmei Kikaku	Nihon Computer Club Renmei Kikaku	1994-09
Loop: Iginahi no Kaikiten	Visual novel, Eroge	Grocer	Grocer	1995-10-20
Lord Monarch	Real-time strategy, Wargame	Nihon Falcom	Nihon Falcom	1991-11-29
The Lord of the Rings Vol. I	Role-playing game	Interplay Productions	StarCraft, Inc.	1992-03
The Lord of the Rings Vol. II: The Two Towers	Role-playing game	Interplay Productions	StarCraft, Inc.	1993-04
Lua	Visual Novel, Eroge	InterHeart	InterHeart	1993-11-26
Lunatic Dawn II	Role-playing game	Artdink	Artdink	1994-11
Lupin Sansei: Hong Kong no Mashu - Fukushū wa Meikyū no Hate ni	Visual novel	High Tech Laboratory Japan	CSK Research Institute Corp.	1990-06
Ma Saiko Jan	Board game	Cosmos Computer	Cosmos Computer	1992-05
Mad Stalker: Full Metal Force	Beat 'em up	Fill-in-Cafe	Family Soft	1994-07-01
Mad●Paradox	Eroge, Role-playing game	Queen Soft	Queen Soft	1994-02
Madō Gakuin R	Eroge, Tactical role-playing game	Foresight	Foresight	1994-11-10
Mahjong Bishōjo Den: Ripple	Board game, Role-playing game	Foresight	Foresight	1995-02
Mahjong Clinic Zoukangou	Board game	Home Data	Home Data	1991-11
Mahjong de Pon!	Board game, Eroge	Active Software	Active Software	1994-04
Mahjong Elegance	Board game	C.Class	C.Class	1994-11-25
Mahjong Gensōkyoku	Board game	Active Software	Active Software	1992-07
Mahjong Gensōkyoku II	Board game, Eroge	Active Software	Active Software	1993-09-25
Mahjong Gensōkyoku the 3rd Stage	Board game, Eroge	Active Software	Active Software	1993-11-03
Mahjong Gokū	Board game	Chat Noir	ASCII Corporation	1989-04
Mahjong Hōtei Raoyui	Board game	Queen Soft	Queen Soft	1995
Mahjong Saikyō Musashi	Board game	Cosmos Computer	Cosmos Computer	1989
Mahō Daisakusen	Shoot 'em up	Raizing	Electronic Arts Victor	1995-02-10
Manami no Doko made Iku no?	Adventure, Visual novel, Eroge	Wendy Magazine	Wendy Magazine	1995-05
Manami no Doko made Iku no? 2: Return of the Kuro Pack	Adventure, Visual novel, Eroge	Wendy Magazine	Wendy Magazine	1995-05
Manami: Ai to Koukan no Hibi	Visual novel, Eroge	Fairy Tale	Fairy Tale	1995
Mandala Keichizoku	Board game	Foresight	Foresight	1995-03
The Manhole	Adventure	Cyan, Inc.	Fujitsu	1990-08-24
Marble Madness	Platform, Racing	Home Data	Home Data	1991-06
Marine Philt	Adventure, Visual novel	FairyTale	FairyTale	1993-03-12
Marionette Mind	Visual novel, Eroge	Studio Milk	Studio Milk	1994-03-11
Mega-Lo-Mania	Real-time strategy	Sensible Software	Imagineer	1993-03
MegaMorph	Rail shooter	Psygnosis	Fujitsu	1994-12
Meisō Toshi	Adventure, Eroge, Visual novel	Tiare	Tiare	1996-02-01
Megaspectre	Combat simulation, First-person shooter	Velocity Development Corporation	Fujitsu	1993-06
Menzoberranzan	Role-playing game	DreamForge Intertainment	KSS	1996-01
Merrygoround: The 4th Unit Series	Adventure, Visual novel	Data West	Data West	1990-12-14
Metal Eye	Eroge, Role-playing game	ELF Corporation	ELF Corporation	1993-07
Metal Eye 2	Eroge, Role-playing game	ELF Corporation	ELF Corporation	1994-09
Microcosm	Rail shooter	Psygnosis	Fujitsu	1993-03
Might and Magic: Clouds of Xeen	Role-playing game	StarCraft, Inc.	StarCraft, Inc.	1993-09
Might and Magic: Darkside of Xeen	Role-playing game	StarCraft, Inc.	StarCraft, Inc.	1994-05
Might and Magic III: Isles of Terra	Role-playing game	New World Computing	StarCraft, Inc.	1992-10
Mirage	Eroge, Role-playing game	Discovery Software	Discovery Software	1992-01
Mirage 2	Eroge, Role-playing game	Discovery Software	Discovery Software	1994-12-02
Mirrors	Visual novel, Horror	Soft Studio Wing	Apros	1992-06
Misato-chan no Yume Nikki	Visual novel, Eroge	Active	Active	1997-04-11
Misty	Visual novel, Eroge	Data West	Data West	1989-06
Mixed-Up Mother Goose	Adventure, Edutainment	Sierra On-Line	Sierra On-Line	1991-02
Mobile Suit Gundam: Hyper Classic Operation	Turn-based strategy	Family Soft	Family Soft	1992-08
Mobile Suit Gundam: Hyper Desert Operation	Turn-based strategy	Family Soft	Family Soft	1992-09
Moeru Asoko no Paipai Yuugi	Board game	Illusion	Illusion	1993-12
Monkey Island 2: LeChuck's Revenge	Adventure	LucasArts	Victor Entertainment	1994-02-25
Moon Light Energy	Visual novel, Eroge	Inter Heart	Inter Heart	1993-06-18
Moonlight-Chan Rin-Shan	Quiz game	D.O. Corp.	D.O. Corp.	1993-03
Morita Shōgi II	Board game	Random House	Enix	1989-03
Mr. Ed Bogas' Music Machine LITE	Non-game, Music	Software Resources International	Fujitsu	1992-12
Ms. Detective File #1: Iwami Ginzan Satsujin Jiken	Visual novel	Data West	Data West	1992-09
Ms. Detective File #2: Sugata-naki Irainin	Visual novel	Data West	Data West	1993-10
Mūgen Hōyō	Visual novel, Eroge	Alice Soft	Alice Soft	1995-07-07
Mujintō Monogatari	Simulation, Survival	Mediamuse	KSS	1995-09
Murder Club DX	Adventure, Visual novel	Riverhillsoft	Riverhillsoft	1992-05-22
Muscle Bomber: The Body Explosion	Fighting, Sports	Capcom	Capcom	1993-11
My Eyes!	Visual novel, Eroge	Birdy Soft	Birdy Soft	1992-11
Naru Mahjong	Board game	Libido	Libido	1995-04
Necronomicon	Adventure, Horror	FairyTale	FairyTale	1994-08
Network Q RAC Rally	Racing	PixelKraft	Victor Entertainment	1995-01-27
Never Land	Visual novel	Tips	Tips	1996-03
The NewZealand Story	Platform	Taito	Ving	1989-08
Nijiiro Denshoku Musume	Casino	I.S.C. Co., Ltd.	I.S.C. Co., Ltd.	1994-08
Niko^{2}	Action	Wolf Team	Wolf Team	1991-11
Ningyō Tsukai	Visual novel, Eroge	Forest	Forest	1993-10
Nobunaga no Yabō: Bushō Fūunroku	Simulation, Turn-based strategy, Wargame	Koei	Koei	1991-07
Nobunaga no Yabō: Haōden	Strategy	Koei	Koei	1993-04
Nobunaga no Yabō: Sengoku Gun'yūden	Simulation, Turn-based strategy, Wargame	Koei	Koei	1989-12
Nobunaga no Yabō: Tenshōki	Simulation, Turn-based strategy, Wargame	Koei	Koei	1995-03
Nonomura Byōin no Hitobito	Visual novel, Eroge	Silky's	Silky's	1994-07
Nōshuku Angel 120%	Visual novel, Eroge	Cocktail Soft	Cocktail Soft	1995-04
Nostalgia 1907	Adventure	Takeru	Sur de Wave	1992-05
Nova	Adventure, Eroge, Visual novel	Cat's Pro	Cat's Pro	1993-07-30
Ōgon no Rashinban: Shōyōmaru San Francisco Kōro Satsujin Jiken	Adventure, Visual novel	Riverhillsoft	Riverhillsoft	1991-06-14
Oh! Pai	Board game, Eroge	Silky's	Silky's	1993-09-22
Okuman Chōja II	Business simulation game	Cosmos Computer	Cosmos Computer	1991-07
Only You: Seikimatsu no Juliet-tachi	Adventure, Eroge, Visual novel	Alice Soft	Alice Soft	1996-01
Operation Wolf	Shooting gallery	Ving Co., Ltd.	Ving Co., Ltd.	1990-04
Palamedes	Puzzle	Ving Co., Ltd.	Ving Co., Ltd.	1991-10
Para PARA Paradise	Role-Playing game, Adventure	Family Soft	Family Soft	1997-03-14
Pasocomic Purple Cat Vol. 1: Bunny Girl Tokushū	Non-game	Palmtree Soft	Babylon	1993-03-01
PasoComic Purple Cat Vol. 2: Hospital Tokushū	Non-game	Palmtree Soft	Babylon	1993-06-01
PasoComic Purple Cat Vol. 3: The Jokyōshi Tokushū	Non-game	Palmtree Soft	Babylon	1993-10-01
Phobos	Visual novel, Eroge	Brain-C2 inc.	Himeya Soft, Inc.	1995-08-25
Planet's Edge	Role-playing game	Ving Co., Ltd.	Ving Co., Ltd.	1993-09
The Playroom	Edutainment	Broderbund	Fujitsu	1994-12-09
Pocky 1-2 & Ponyon	Adventure, Eroge, Visual novel	Pony Tail	Pony Tail	1994-06-15
Ponkan	Adventure, Eroge, Visual novel	Ponytail Soft	Ponytail Soft	1994-07
Ponyon	Adventure, Eroge, Visual novel	Pony Tail	Pony Tail	1992-09
Populous II: Trials of the Olympian Gods	God game, Real-time strategy	Infinity Co., Ltd.	Imagineer	1993-02
Populous: The Promised Lands	God game	Infinity Co., Ltd.	Imagineer	1990-07-27
Power DoLLS	Strategy	Kogado Studio	Kogado Studio	1994-07-22
Power DoLLS 2	Strategy	Kogado Studio	Kogado Studio	1995-11
Power Monger	Real-time strategy	Infinity Co., Ltd.	Imagineer	1992-05
Premium	Visual novel, Eroge	Silky's	Silky's	1992-11
Premium 2	Visual novel, Eroge	Silky's	Silky's	1993-01
Presence	Adventure, Visual novel	Takeru	Sur de Wave	1992-12
Present 2	Visual novel	Orange House	Orange House	1992-10
Prince of Persia	Platform	Riverhillsoft	Riverhillsoft	1992-06-12
Prince of Persia 2: The Shadow and the Flame	Platform	Broderbund	Interprog	1994-07
Princess Danger	Adventure, Visual novel	Studio Jikkenshitsu	Janis	1996-04-19
Princess Maker 2	Life simulation	Gainax	Gainax	1994-09-30
Private Slave	Adventure, Eroge, Visual novel	Raccoon	Raccoon	1993-08
Pro Student G	Visual novel, Eroge	Alice Soft	Alice Soft	1993-07
Pro Yakyū Family Stadium '90	Sports	Game Arts	Game Arts	1990-09-28
Provvidenza: Legenda la Spada di Alfa	Role-playing game	Kinpukurin	Kinpukurin	1991-09
Psychic Detective Series Final: Solitude Part 1	Adventure, Visual novel	Data West	Data West	1992-11-27
Psychic Detective Series Final: Solitude Part 2	Adventure, Visual novel	Data West	Data West	1993-03-19
Psychic Detective Series Vol.1: Invitation - Kage kara no Shōtaijō	Adventure, Visual novel	Data West	Data West	1989-03
Psychic Detective Series Vol.2: Memories	Adventure, Visual novel	Data West	Data West	1989-10
Psychic Detective Series Vol.3: Aýa	Adventure, Visual novel	Data West	Data West	1990-06-02
Psychic Detective Series Vol.4: Orgel	Adventure, Visual novel	Data West	Data West	1991-04-05
Psychic Detective Series Vol.5: Nightmare	Adventure, Visual novel	Data West	Data West	1991-11-27
Pu·Li·Ru·La	Beat 'em up	Ving Co., Ltd.	Ving Co., Ltd.	1994-11
Puppy Love 2	Life simulation	Tom Snyder Productions, Inc.	Fujitsu	1993-03
Puyo Puyo	Puzzle	CSK Research Institute Corp.	CSK Research Institute Corp.	1994-03
Puzznic	Puzzle	Section 3	Ving Co., Ltd.	1990-07
The Queen of Duellist	Eroge, Fighting	Agumix	Agumix	1993-06
The Queen of Duellist Gaiden Alpha	Eroge, Fighting	Agumix	Agumix	1994-03
The Queen of Duellist Gaiden Alpha Light	Eroge, Fighting	Agumix	Agumix	1994-04
Quiz Banchou	Quiz game	Active	Active	1992-05
Quiz De Let's Go!!	Quiz game	Great Co., Ltd.	Great Co., Ltd.	1993-03
Raiden Densetsu	Shoot 'em up	Success	KID	1991-11
Rainbow Islands Extra	Platform	Ving Co., Ltd.	Ving Co., Ltd.	1992-04-24
Rance 4.1: O-Kusuri Kōjō o Sukue!	Eroge, Role-playing game	Alice Soft	Alice Soft	1995-12-01
Rance 4.2: Angel-gumi	Eroge, Role-playing game	Alice Soft	Alice Soft	1995-12-08
Rance II: Hangyaku no Shōjotachi	Eroge, Role-playing game	Alice Soft	Alice Soft	1990-06
Rance III: Leazas Kanraku	Eroge, Role-playing game	Alice Soft	Alice Soft	1992-05-13
Rance IV: Kyōdan no Isan	Eroge, Role-playing game	Alice Soft	Alice Soft	1994-03
Rance: Hikari o Motomete	Eroge, Role-playing game	Alice Soft	Alice Soft	1990-03
Ravenloft: Aku no Keshin	Role-playing game	Ving Co., Ltd.	Ving Co., Ltd.	1995-04
Rayxanber	Shoot 'em up	Data West	Data West	1990-04
Record of Lodoss War II: Goshiki no Maryū	Role-playing game	HummingBirdSoft	HummingBirdSoft	1994-06
Record of Lodoss War: Haīro No Majio	Role-playing game	HummingBirdSoft	HummingBirdSoft	1994-04-15
Regional Power II	Construction and management simulation, Strategy	Cosmos Computer	Cosmos Computer	1992-09
Reijō Monogatari	Visual novel, Eroge	Inter Heart	Inter Heart	1995-04
Reira: Slave Doll	Adventure, Eroge, Visual novel	Silky's	Silky's	1994-07
Rejection: Den-No Senshi	First-person shooter, Role-playing game	Takeru	Sur de Wave	1992-12
Return to Zork	Adventure	Activision	Data West	1994-10-29
Ring Out!!	Visual novel, Eroge	ZyX	ZyX	1995-06-09
Rinkan Gakkō	Visual novel, Eroge	Foster	Foster	1996-02
Rocket Ranger	Action-adventure	Cinemaware	Pony Canyon	1990-05
Royal Blood	Turn-based strategy, Turn-based tactics	Koei	Koei	1992-05
Ryūtōden	Puzzle	Publishing International	Fujitsu	1994-06-24
S.A.2	Visual Novel	Tanaka Brothers	A-Inn	1994
Sakura no Mori	Visual Novel	Active	Active	1995-10-27
Samurai Spirits	Fighting	Japan Home Video	Japan Home Video	1995-09
Sangokushi II	Role-playing game, Simulation, Turn-based strategy, Wargame	Koei	Koei	1990-06-29
Sangokushi III	Role-playing game, Simulation, Turn-based strategy, Wargame	Koei	Koei	1992-06
Sangokushi IV	Role-playing game, Simulation, Turn-based strategy, Wargame	Koei	Koei	1994-06-02
Sargon V: World Class Chess	Chess	Activison	G.A.M. Corporation	1992-11
Sayaka & Miho	Visual novel, Eroge	Red-Zone	FairyTale	1994-09-14
Sayonara no Mukō-gawa	Visual novel, Eroge	Foster	Foster	1997-08-08
Scavenger 4	Rail shooter	Psygnosis	Fujitsu	1993-11-27
Schwarzschild IV: The Cradle End	Turn-based strategy	Kogado Studio	Kogado Studio	1993-12
Schwarzschild: Kyōran no Ginga	Turn-based strategy	Kogado Studio	Kogado Studio	1991-11
The Secret of Monkey Island	Adventure	Lucasfilm Games	Victor Musical Industries	1992-09
Sekigahara	Strategy	Artdink	Artdink	1992-04
Setsujū: Yuganda Kioku	Adventure	JAST	JAST	1995-04
Shadow of the Beast	Platform	Reflections Interactive	Victor Musical Industries	1991-09
Shadow of the Beast II: Jūshin no Jubaku	Platform	Reflections Interactive	Victor Entertainment	1993-06
Shamhat: The Holy Circlet	Adventure	Data West	Data West	1993-04
Shanghai	Puzzle	Activision	ASCII Entertainment	1990-12
Shanghai: Banri no Chōjō	Puzzle	Activison, Success	Electronic Arts Victor	1995-09
Shangrlia	Eroge, Turn-based strategy	ELF Corporation	ELF Corporation	1992-01-17
Shangrlia 2	Eroge, Turn-based strategy	ELF Corporation	ELF Corporation	1994-10
Sherlock Holmes: Consulting Detective	Adventure, Interactive movie	ICOM Simulations	Fujitsu	1991-06
Shinc	Dungeon crawl, Role-playing game	Libido	Libido	1993-04
Shinjuku Labyrinth	Visual novel	Technopolis Soft	Tokuma Shoten	1994-12-08
Shisetsu Sangokushi	Strategy	Tensui Software	Tensui Software	1993-09
Shisetsu Sengoku Jidai	Strategy	Tensui Software	Tensui Software	1994-06-03
Shogi Seiten	Board game	Home Data	Home Data	1992-04
Shooting Towns	Shoot 'em up	Amorphous	Amorphous	1990-03
Sid Meier's Railroad Tycoon	Business simulation game	MPS Labs	MicroProse	1993-12
Silent Möbius: Case - Titanic	Adventure, Visual novel	Gainax	Gainax	1991-09
SimAnt	Life simulation	Imagineer	Imagineer	1993-02
SimCity	City-building game	Maxis	Fujitsu	1990-03
SimCity 2000	City-building game	Maxis	Fujitsu	1994-12
SimCity: Terrain Editor	Non-game, Data disk	Maxis	Fujitsu	1992-06
SimEarth: The Living Planet	Life simulation	Imagineer	Imagineer	1991-09
SimFarm	Construction and management simulation	Maxis	Fujitsu	1994-09-09
Soft de Hard na Monogatari	Visual novel	System Sacom	System Sacom	1989-04
Soft de Hard na Monogatari 2	Visual novel	System Sacom	System Sacom	1989-07
Sokoban Perfect	Puzzle	Thinking Rabbit	Thinking Rabbit	1990-07
Solitaire Royale/Puppy Love	Card game, Life simulation	Publishing International, Tom Snyder Productions, Inc.	Fujitsu	1989-07
Soreyuke Nanpa-kun	Visual novel, Eroge	Virgin House	Virgin House	1991-08
Sotsugyō: Graduation '93	Adventure, Visual novel	Headroom	Japan Home Video	1993-10
Space Rogue	Space combat simulation	Origin Systems	Wave Train	1990-07
Splatterhouse	Beat 'em up	Ving Co., Ltd.	Ving Co., Ltd.	1992-06-25
Star Cruiser II: The Odysseus Project	First-person shooter, Role-playing game	Arsys Software	Japan Home Video	1994-07
Steepia	Puzzle	Software Resources International	Fujitsu	1993-06
Steepia Lite	Puzzle	Software Resources International	Fujitsu	1993-03
Strike Commander	Combat flight simulation	Origin Systems	Electronic Arts Victor	1994-08
Strike Commander Plus	Combat flight simulation	Origin Systems	Electronic Arts Victor	1995-04
Stronghold: Kōtei no Yōsai	City-building game, Real-time strategy	Ving Co., Ltd.	Ving Co., Ltd.	1994-06
Suikoden: Tenmei no Chikai	Turn-based strategy	Koei	Koei	1990-02
Super D.P.S	Visual novel, Eroge	Alice Soft	Alice Soft	1992-09
Super Daisenryaku	Turn-based strategy, Wargame	SystemSoft	SystemSoft	1990-03
Super Odyssey	Role-playing game	Wave Train	Wave Train	1989-12
Super Real Mahjong PII & PIII	Board game, Eroge	Ving Co., Ltd.	Ving Co., Ltd.	1992-04
Super Real Mahjong PII & PIII+	Board game, Eroge	Ving Co., Ltd.	Ving Co., Ltd.	1993-03
Super Real Mahjong PIV	Board game, Eroge	Ving Co., Ltd.	Ving Co., Ltd.	1994-05
Super Shanghai: Dragon's Eye	Puzzle	Activision	Hot-B	1991-11
Super Shooting Towns	Shoot 'em up	Amorphous	Amorphous	1991-12-20
Super Street Fighter II: The New Challengers	Fighting	Capcom	Capcom	1994-10-28
Super Ultra Mucchin Puripuri Cyborg: Marilyn DX	Visual novel, Eroge	JAST	JAST	1994-04
Suzaku	Dungeon crawl, Role-playing game	Wolf Team	Wolf Team	1992-10
Sweet Angel	Visual novel, Eroge	Active Software	Active Software	1992-11
Syndicate	Real-time tactics	Bullfrog Productions	Electronic Arts Victor	1994-07
T.D.F.: Terrestrial Defense Force	Turn-based strategy, Wargame	Data West	Data West	1990-09-07
Tactical Tank Corps DX	Strategy	G.A.M. Corporation	G.A.M. Corporation	1995-02
Taikō Risshiden	Role-playing game, Strategy	Koei	Koei	1992-05
Takamizawa Kyōsuke Nekketsu!! Kyōiku Kenshū	Adventure, Visual novel	ZyX	ZyX	1995-01-21
Tamashii no Mon - Dante Shinkyoku yori	Action, Adventure	Koei	Koei	1993-06
Tania	Visual novel, Eroge	Tips	Tips	1996-11-01
Tanjō: Debut	Business simulation game	Headroom	Data West	1994-04-08
Tatsujin Ō	Shoot 'em up	Ving Co., Ltd.	Ving Co., Ltd.	1993-04
Teito Taisen	Visual novel, Eroge	Chou Onsoku	Chou Onsoku	1989-11
Teitoku no Ketsudan	Turn-based strategy, Wargame	Koei	Koei	1990-04
Teitoku no Ketsudan II	Turn-based strategy, Wargame	Koei	Koei	1994-06
Tenka Gomen	Strategy	Artdink	Artdink	1994-06
Tensen Nyan Nyan	Board game	Pony Tail	Pony Tail	1994-09-22
Tenshi-Tachi no Gogo Collection	Compilation	JAST	JAST	1995-03-01
Tenshi-Tachi no Gogo Collection 2	Compilation	JAST	JAST	1995-11-30
Tenshi-Tachi no Gogo III: Bangai-Hen Hansei-Ban	Visual novel, Eroge	JAST	JAST	1993-03-02
Tenshi-Tachi no Gogo Special: Gomen ne Angel - Yokohama Monogatari	Visual novel, Eroge	JAST	JAST	1992-01
Tenshi-Tachi no Gogo V: Nerawareta Tenshi	Visual novel, Eroge	JAST	JAST	1992-12
Tenshi-Tachi no Gogo VI: My Fair Teacher	Visual novel, Eroge	JAST	JAST	1993-08-31
Tenshi-Tachi no Gogo: Tenkōsei	Visual novel, Eroge	JAST	JAST	1995-07-18
Tenshin Ranma	Dungeon crawl, Eroge, Role-playing game	ELF Corporation	ELF Corporation	1992-05
TEO: The Other Earth	Simulation, Strategy	Fujitsu	Fujitsu	1995-09
Thanatos	Visual novel, Eroge	Birdy Soft	Birdy Soft	1992-03-10
Theme Park	Construction and management simulation	Bullfrog Productions	Electronic Arts Victor	1995-09-22
Time Stripper	Visual novel, Eroge	Foster	Foster	1996-07-19
Titan	Action, Puzzle	Titus France SA	Fujitsu	1989-11
Tokyo-to Dai 24 Ku	City-building game	Artdink	Artdink	1992-12
Tōshin Toshi	Eroge, Role-playing game	Alice Soft	Alice Soft	1990-12-15
Tōshin Toshi II	Eroge, Role-playing game	Alice Soft	Alice Soft	1995-04-28
Tōshin Toshi II: Soshite, Sorekara...	Visual novel, Eroge	Alice Soft	Alice Soft	1995-12-08
Totsugeki! Bakkon Street	Board game	JAST	JAST	1994-01
Totsugeki! Bakkon Street II: Hunting Roulette	Board game	JAST	JAST	1994-09-25
Touch My Heart	Visual Novel	D.O.	D.O.	1995-03
Traffic Confusion	Strategy	Masterpiece	Masterpiece	1992-06
Treeclub	Edutainment	Broderbund	Fujitsu	1995-03-28
Trigger	Visual novel, Eroge	ZyX	ZyX	1994-09-20
Trigger 2	Visual novel, Eroge	ZyX	ZyX	1995-09-29
True Heart	Adventure, Eroge, Visual novel	Cocktail Soft	Cocktail Soft	1995-02
Tunnels & Trolls: Crusaders of Khazan	Role-playing game	StarCraft, Inc.	StarCraft, Inc.	1990-11
Turbo Outrun	Racing	CSK Research Institute Corp.	CSK Research Institute Corp.	1989
Two Shot Diary	Visual novel, Eroge	Mink Co. Ltd.	Mink Co. Ltd.	1995-01-16
Uchū Kaitō Funny Bee	Adventure, Eroge	Alice Soft	Alice Soft	1994-09-09
Ultima IV: Quest of the Avatar	Role-playing game	Origin Systems	Fujitsu	1992-04
Ultima Trilogy: I ♦ II ♦ III	Role-playing game	Origin Systems	Fujitsu	1990-10
Ultima Underworld: The Stygian Abyss	Action role-playing game, Dungeon crawl	Blue Sky Productions	Electronic Arts Victor	1993-12-17
Ultima Underworld II: Labyrinth of Worlds	Action role-playing game, Dungeon crawl	Looking Glass Studios	Electronic Arts Victor	1995-03
Ultima V: Warriors of Destiny	Role-playing game	Origin Systems	Fujitsu	1992-08
Ultima VI: The False Prophet	Role-playing game	Origin Systems	Fujitsu	1991-12
URM: M15 Wakusei ni Umarete	Visual novel	Beluga Computer	Japan Home Video	1994-12
Ushinawareta Rakuen	Visual novel	Silky's	Silky's	1995-04
Vain Dream	Action role-playing game	Glodia	Glodia	1993-04-23
Vain Dream II	Action role-playing game	Glodia	Glodia	1993-09-24
Vampire High School	Adventure, Visual Novel	InterHeart	InterHeart	1994-07-08
Vanishing Point: Tenshi no Kieta Machi	Visual novel	Tiare	Tiare	1995-10-25
Vastness: Kūkyo no Ikenie-tachi	Visual novel, Eroge	Mediax Co., Ltd.	CD Bros.	1993-09
Veil of Darkness: Norowareta Yogen	Action, Adventure, Role-playing game	Ving Co., Ltd.	Ving Co., Ltd.	1994-08
Viewpoint	Shoot 'em up	Ving Co., Ltd.	Ving Co., Ltd.	1993-11
Viper GTS	Visual novel, Eroge	Sogna	Sogna	1995-11-24
Viper-V6: Turbo RS	Visual novel, Eroge	Sogna	Sogna	1995-04-14
Viper-V8: Turbo RS	Visual novel, Eroge	Sogna	Sogna	1995-06
Viper-V10: Turbo RS	Visual novel, Eroge	Sogna	Sogna	1995-07
Viper-V12	Visual novel, Eroge	Sogna	Sogna	1995-12
Virgin Angel	Visual novel, Eroge	Crystal Soft	Crystal Soft	1995
Virtuacall	Visual novel, Eroge	FairyTale	FairyTale	1995
Virtuacall 2	Visual novel, Eroge	FairyTale	FairyTale	1995-12-22
The Visitor	Adventure	Fujitsu	Fujitsu	1989-09
Volfied	Action	Ving Co., Ltd.	Ving Co., Ltd.	1991-12
Wakoku Seiha Den	Quiz game	MIC	MIC	1994-04
Wedding Errantry: Gyakutama Ō	Role-playing game	Grocer	Grocer	1995
Where in the World Is Carmen Sandiego? Deluxe Edition	Edutainment, Strategy	Broderbund	Fujitsu	1993-04
Wing Commander	Space combat simulation	Origin Systems	Fujitsu	1992-12
Wing Commander II: Vengeance of the Kilrathi	Space combat simulation	Origin Systems	Fujitsu	1995-07
Wing Commander: Armada	Space combat simulation	Origin Systems	Electronic Arts Victor	1995-07
Wing Commander: The Secret Missions & The Secret Missions 2	Space combat simulation	Origin Systems	Fujitsu	1994-11
Winning Post	Sports	Koei	Koei	1993-06
Wizardry V: Heart of the Maelstrom	Role-playing game	Sir-Tech	Sir-Tech	1990-12
Wizardry VI: Bane of the Cosmic Forge	Role-playing game	Sir-Tech	ASCII Entertainment	1991-12
Wizardry VII: Crusaders of the Dark Savant	Role-playing game	Sir-Tech	ASCII Entertainment	1994-09
Wonpara Wars	Board game, Eroge, Strategy	Mink Co. Ltd.	Mink Co. Ltd.	1995-02-10
Wonpara Wars II	Board game, Eroge, Strategy	Mink Co. Ltd.	Mink Co. Ltd.	1995-05-19
Words Worth	Dungeon crawl, Eroge, Role-playing game	ELF Corporation	ELF Corporation	1993-09-30
Wrestle Angels	Cards, Strategy	Great Co., Ltd.	Communication Group Plum	1992
Wrestle Angels 2: Top Eventer	Cards, Strategy	Great Co., Ltd.	Communication Group Plum	1992
Wrestle Angels 3	Cards, Strategy	Great Co., Ltd.	Communication Group Plum	1994-08-12
Wrestle Angels Special: Mō Hitori no Top Eventer	Cards, Strategy	Great Co., Ltd.	Communication Group Plum	1994-12-02
Wyatt: The 4th Unit Series	Adventure, Visual novel	Data West	Data West	1992-04-03
Xak II: Rising of the Redmoon	Action role-playing game	Micro Cabin	Micro Cabin	1991-07
Xak III: The Eternal Recurrence	Action role-playing game	Micro Cabin	Micro Cabin	1993-09-10
Xenon: Mugen no Shitai	Visual novel, Eroge	C's Ware	C's Ware	1995-03-31
Yami no Ketsuzoku Special	Visual novel, Eroge	System Sacom	System Sacom	1991-06
YES! HG: Erotic Voice Version	Visual novel, Eroge	Himeya Soft, Inc.	Himeya Soft, Inc.	1995-12
Yōjū Club Custom	Eroge, Puzzle	D.O. Corp.	D.O. Corp.	1992-03-22
Yōjū Senki: A.D. 2048	Role-playing game, Turn-based strategy, Eroge	D.O. Corp.	D.O. Corp.	1993-11
Yōjū Senki 2: Reimei no Senshi-tachi	Role-playing game, Turn-based strategy, Eroge	D.O. Corp.	D.O. Corp.	1993-11
Yumimi Mix	Adventure	CSK Research Institute Corp.	CSK Research Institute Corp.	1993-12-10
Yūwaku	Adventure, Eroge, Visual novel	T2	T2	1996-05
Zak McKracken and the Alien Mindbenders	Adventure	Lucasfilm Games	Fujitsu	1991-02
Zan II: Towns Special	Simulation, Turn-based strategy, Wargame	Wolf Team	Wolf Team	1992-04
Zan III: Towns Special	Simulation, Turn-based strategy, Wargame	Wolf Team	Wolf Team	1994-03
Zatsuon Ryōiki	Visual novel, Eroge	D.O. Corp.	D.O. Corp.	1995-02
Zen Nihon Bishōjo Mahjong Senshūken Taikai: Heart de Ron!!	Board game	D.O. Corp.	D.O. Corp.	1995-03
Zenith	Visual novel, Eroge	Himeya Soft, Inc.	Himeya Soft, Inc.	1995-02
Zerø: The 4th Unit Act.4	Adventure, Visual novel	Data West	Data West	1989-12
Zoku Yōjū Senki: Sajin no Mokushiroku	Eroge, Role-playing game, Turn-based strategy	D.O. Corp.	D.O. Corp.	1994-02-25

== See also ==
- Lists of video games
