= Renna =

Renna may refer to:

- Renna, Chinese for Mimana, Korea
- John Renna (1920–1998), American Republican Party politician
- Bill Renna (1924–2014), outfielder in Major League Baseball from 1953–1959
- Stacie Lynn Renna (born 1973), American film, television, and stage actress
- Tony Renna (1976–2003), American race car driver who raced in the Indy Racing League IndyCar Series
- Patrick Renna (born 1979), American actor who began his career in the film The Sandlot
