= 4D Sports Tennis =

1990 video game

- European box art
- Developer(s): Distinctive Software
- Publisher(s): Mindscape
- Platform(s): MS-DOS, FM Towns, PC-98
- Release: 1990
- Genre(s): Sports
- Mode(s): Single-player

4D Sports Tennis (also known as World Tour Tennis, World Tennis Championships and Compaq Grand Slam Cup) is a 3D Tennis video game with motion capture animation of the 4D Sports series. The game uses untextured 3D polygon graphics similar to other games in the series.

== See also ==
- 4D Sports Boxing
- 4D Sports Driving - also known as Stunts
