= Darwin's Dilemma =

1990 video game

- Developer: Inline Design
- Publisher: Inline Design
- Designers: Andre Ouimet (game design and implementation); David Sifry (additional programming); Yves Legault (additional programming); John Kramer (packaging design); Charlie Mitchell (box illustration); Darryl Peck (producer)
- Platforms: Classic Mac OS, X68000, FM Towns, PC-98
- Release: 1990
- Genre: Puzzle
- Mode: Single-player

Darwin's Dilemma is a puzzle video game for Classic Mac OS and X68000. It was developed by André Ouimet and published in 1990 by Inline Design. The goal is to match creatures together. After enough matches the creatures will "evolve" into new ones, and these new creatures must be again matched so they can evolve, and so on.

== Reviews ==
- 1992 Games 100 in Games #112
