= Life & Death =

1988 video game

- Developers: Jake Smith & Don Laabs (Atari ST & Amiga conversions by Simon Beal)
- Publisher: The Software Toolworks
- Designer: Dr. Myo Thant
- Platforms: Mac OS, MS-DOS, Amiga, Atari ST, Apple IIGS, FM Towns, NEC PC-9801, X68000
- Release: 1988
- Genre: Simulation
- Mode: Single player

Life & Death is a computer game published in 1988 by The Software Toolworks. The player takes the role of an abdominal surgeon. The original packaging for the game included a surgical mask and gloves. A sequel, Life & Death II: The Brain, was published in 1990. In this sequel, the player is a neurosurgeon.

== Gameplay ==
In the role of a resident abdominal surgeon at fictional hospital Toolworks General, the player must diagnose and treat a variety of maladies including kidney stones, arthritis, appendicitis, and aneuritic aorta. The last two require the player to perform surgery.

== Reception ==
Life & Death emphasized realism and visual detail even with limited colors.

Compute! complimented Life & Death's graphics and sound, stating that the game effectively used CGA's four colors and the PC speaker, and stated that the game's warning to those queasy of blood was accurate. An author on Gamasutra praised the game for its attention to detail and the way it offers significant depth and challenge despite only the mouse.

Franklin N. Tessler, M.D. in Macworld noted the Macintosh version's gore and difficulty, stating that "If the embossed photo of a bloody brain on the box doesn't get to you, the challenge and frustration of playing the game just might". He approved of the game's educational value and stated that it was "surprisingly realistic", albeit with some errors in the documentation. Tessler criticized the "annoying" copy protection, monochrome graphics, and lack of a save function.

Life & Death was nominated for Software Publishers Association (SPA) awards for Best Game, Best Simulation and Best Use of Technology.
