= Ishin no Arashi =

1988 video game

- Developer: Koei
- Publisher: Koei
- Platforms: PC-9801, PC-8801, FM-7, Sharp X1, MSX2, FM Towns, X68000, Family Computer, Sega Saturn, PlayStation, Windows
- Release: 1988
- Genres: Simulation, strategy
- Mode: Single-player

Ishin no Arashi (Note: Japanese: 維新の嵐, Hepburn: Ishin no Arashi; lit. "Storm of Restoration") is a 1988 historical simulation video game developed and published by Koei. It was released for several platforms such as PC-98, MSX2, Family Computer, PlayStation, Sega Saturn and Windows. A part of Koei's "Historical Simulation" line of titles, it is focused in the Bakumatsu period of the history of Japan, where the player attempts to unify Japan and start the Meiji Restoration.

It was followed by the sequels Ishin no Arashi: Bakumatsu Shishiden in 1998 and Ishin no Arashi: Shippū Ryūmaden in 2010 for the Nintendo DS. Koei Tecmo re-released the Windows version in 2017. Hamster Corporation released the NES version as part of their Console Archives series for the Nintendo Switch 2 and PlayStation 5 in April 2026.

== Gameplay ==
The player controls Sakamoto Ryōma or other dignitaries who must unite Japan by persuading other dignitaries in the country into allying with the player against the shogunate. The persuasion system involves the player interacting with the dignitaries through discussions on various topic, which can vary based on the player character's physical and mental strength. If the dignitaries are satisfied, they will either be on good terms with the player or ally with the player, the latter of which allowing the player to gain control of the dignitary's resources. If the dignitaries are not satisfied, they may engage in sword fights. Clans who disagree with the player can be attacked by the player's soldiers in planned assaults.

== Reception ==
Famitsu gave the Family Computer version a 25/40 score.
