= Leading Company =

1992 video game

- Super Famicom cover art
- Developer: Koei
- Publisher: Koei
- Composers: Yoshihisa Tomabechi; Mark Soskin; Kazumasa Mitsui
- Series: Koei Executive Series
- Platforms: Super Famicom, PC-98, FM Towns, X68000,
- Release: X68000: JP: July 30, 1992; Super Famicom: JP: February 26, 1993
- Genre: Strategy
- Modes: Single-player, multiplayer

Leading Company (リーディングカンパニー) is a construction-oriented strategy video game released for the Super Famicom (1993), PC-98, X68000 (1992), and FM Towns.

Both versions of this game were released only in the Japanese market, but the PC-98 version has sharper graphics and the ability to use a mouse. Instead of abstract colors (to depict control of each square of the board), buildings are used to depict a typical Japanese residential neighborhood. A theme park is shown on an island in the PC-98 version to depict recreational opportunities while the interior of the corporate headquarters is seen in the X68000 version.

== Gameplay ==
This player is adjusting the levels of production at corporate headquarters.

The traditional definition of a leading company is a corporation that currently dominates the "corporate wars" against their competitors. Its employees are considered by most people to be winning the "rat race".

The game challenges young people to create their own business empire by researching and marketing better VHS machines for the Japanese consumers. In both versions of the game, the player is introduced to jazzy instrumental song being played in the background while neon pictures of various people fly across the screen. As of 2021, there has been no attempt to produce an English language version for this game either through official channels or through unofficial emulator translator groups. This game is considered to be in Japanese for the full duration of the game, making literacy skills in Japanese mandatory. Only the brand names themselves use ASCII letters; all other words use the Japanese alphabet. There are only two time periods in the game and jazz music plays throughout the entire game.

The player can either start in the 1970s when VCRs were beginning to be researched in Japan or in the 1980s when VHS (and video cassette recorders) were beginning to come of age. Up to eight buildings can be constructed on the corporation's property to build and research new technology, but three buildings are already established at the start of the game. Each product the player manufactures has a separate profit chart. When an older model goes down in profits, the player should research and manufacture a newer one (and discontinue the older one) and make more money from willing Japanese customers.

It is the job of the player to try to keep his chosen corporation profitable by creating new VHS machines while making sure that people still spend money on the ones being made. If they go down to zero or less, then the company goes bankrupt. At this point, the player loses the game. When a company goes bankrupt, a television news screen appears with the English word "DISSOLVED" on the picture caption.
