= The Atlas (video game) =

1991 video game

- Cover art (PC-98)
- Developer: Artdink
- Publishers: Artdink; Pack-In-Video (Super Famicom)
- Platforms: NEC PC-98; FM Towns; MS-DOS; PC Engine; Super Famicom
- Release: NEC PC-98: JP: August 2, 1991; PC Engine: JP: March 4, 1994; Super Famicom: JP: March 24, 1995
- Genre: Simulation w/ strategy elements
- Mode: Single-player or multiplayer

The Atlas (ジ・アトラス, The Atlas) is a multiplatform strategy/simulation video game developed by Artdink Development. The game is set during the Age of Discovery in the 15th century. It was released in August 1991 for the NEC PC-9801, FM-TOWNS and MS-DOS, with a PC version released on March 4, 1995 and a version for the Super Nintendo Entertainment System released by Pack-In-Video on March 24 of the same year. It was also ported to Windows in September 2000. A version for Wii Virtual Console released exclusively in Japan on February 19, 2008. The sequel to The Atlas, titled The Atlas II, was released on April 26, 1993.

== Gameplay ==
There is a strict time limit of five years to discover mysterious lands that are 1,000 miles or 1,600 kilometres south of Portugal. Players can work for an admiral and can either change employment or even retire. Specialized names for the adventures, along with their characteristics and every kind of information possible is synthesized by the combination of certain attributes. The topographic features are created completely by random by a method of biosynthesis.

Elements of war and plague affect the political stability in each of the game's regions. As the years progress in the game, trade and exploration play a role in impacting the in-game economy. Procurement, pestilence and contagious diseases are created through trade, decreasing the number of residents that reside in that particular town or city. These factors may also lead to the loss of vital trade ships. A contingent of information is used in order to enhance the illusion of being taken home. The map in the game is basically close to that of the parts of the Earth that were known in the 15th century. Encyclopedias can be found in the cities in addition to world maps and local specialties. Even animals can be found in the in-game towns. Strange life forms and primitive civilizations are randomly distributed on the map, they are described in the encyclopedia that covers the entire in-game universe.

The game was later published in the German market by Sunflowers Interactive Entertainment Software.

== Legacy ==
The sequel released in 1993, titled The Atlas II, takes place in the 16th century. The basic system is kept intact but with a few differences. In this game, the player is assigned the role of the original traveler's son. Discovering new cities and inland transportation between cities is now possible. It is possible in this game to trade and transport products from the cities themselves.

Players have to solve a mystery revolving around a temple. They can now find a "Temple of Aeolus", concerning the names of the 12 different constellations on the Zodiac.
