= Jewel BEM Hunter Lime =

Anime & video game series

宝魔ハンターライム (Hōma Hantā Raimu)
- Genre: Adventure, Comedy
- Video game
- Developer: Silence
- Publisher: Brother Industries; Asmik
- Genre: Adventure
- Platform: PC-9801, X68000, FM Towns, PlayStation, Sega Saturn
- Released: June 10, 1993
- Original video animation
- Directed by: Tetsuro Amino
- Written by: Kenichiro Nakamura
- Studio: Ashi Productions
- Licensed by: NA: Sentai Filmworks
- Released: October 25, 1996 – March 7, 1997
- Episodes: 3

Jewel BEM Hunter Lime (宝魔ハンターライム, Hōma Hantā Raimu) is a Japanese PC game released in 1993. It was adapted to a 3-episode OVA released between 1996 and 1997. The OVAs were initially licensed by Media Blasters. It is currently licensed by Sentai Filmworks.

== Plot ==
Once upon a month, a door behind the full moon opens. This door is between the human world and magical world. Now it just so happens that on one such night, Lime and Bass are in hot pursuit of a demon who had stolen six power gems from the magical world. The demon escapes to the human world through the open door, and the two follow. Now they must search for the six power gems, all of which have been scattered all over Tokyo. It's up to Lime and Bass to blend into with humans and find the gems.

== Characters ==
Lime
Voiced by: Sakiko Tamagawa (Japanese); Stacie Renna (English)
A demon girl with wings, who can transform into various female disguises.
Bass
Voiced by: Kappei Yamaguchi (Japanese); Ed Paul (English)
A demon who can transform into a monster. He is perverted, which makes Lime angry and beat him up.
Doc
Voiced by: Yūichi Nagashima (Japanese); J. David Brimmer (English)
A big, burly female doctor who appears in the third episode.
Mizuki Seo
Voiced by: Yuri Shiratori (Japanese); Mandy Bonhomme (English)
A normal human girl. She becomes Lime's friend when she comes to attend school. She is clueless to Lime and Bass's mission.
Mr. Candle
Voiced by: Hiroko Takemasa (Japanese); Bill Timoney (English)
A monster taking on the form of a candle. He can use his wax to freeze people and is angry at humans because of their use of electricity.
Mr. Purse
Voiced by: Ikue Ohtani (Japanese); Georgette Riley (English)
A monster taking on the form of a coin purse. Unlike the other two, he is kind and not good at being a monster. He came to existence due to the wide use of credit cards instead of cash.
Mr. C. Ringe
Voiced by: Omi Minami (Japanese); Dana Halsted (English)
A monster taking on the form of a needle. The most vengeful of the monsters, angry at the humans because of their fear of needles.

== See also ==
- List of anime aired on TBS
