= 4D Sports Boxing =

1991 video game

- North American cover art
- Developer(s): Distinctive Software
- Publisher(s): Mindscape; Electronic Arts
- Designer(s): Jay MacDonald; Chris Taylor; Rick Friesen
- Artist(s): Gerard DeSouza; David Adams
- Composer(s): Michael J. Sokyrka; Krisjan Hatlelid; Brian Plank
- Platform(s): Amiga, MS-DOS, Macintosh, FM Towns Marty
- Release: June 15, 1991
- Genre(s): Sports
- Mode(s): Single-player

4D Sports Boxing is a 3D boxing video game, with motion capture animation, developed by Distinctive Software and released in 1991 for MS-DOS, Amiga, and Macintosh. It is part of the 4D Sports series along with 4D Sports Driving and 4D Sports Tennis. An updated version was published by Electronic Arts in 1992, including an FM Towns Marty port.

== Gameplay ==
A match in progress

The game features stylized boxers in polygon-based graphics, composed of triangles, some with names suggestive of non-fictional people. All opponent boxers have different fighting styles: some prefer to attack, some to counter-attack. Some (like Smokin' Joe Blow) have great punching power, some have amazing speed; The Champ has nearly perfect attributes. The game is regarded as one of earliest, and possibly first, 3D head-to-head fighting games. The player can choose which attributes of the playable boxer's attributes to improve: speed, power or stamina. While fighting, different tactics and strategies can be used, like all-out attacks, counter-attacks, dodging, etc. Sometimes fights end in a unanimous decision, even 15 round fights. Draws and disqualifications are also possibilities.

== Development ==
The game was published by Mindscape in June 1991 for IBM PC compatibles, Macintosh, Amiga, and FM Towns Marty. The Macintosh version has slightly better graphics with a smaller screen size.

An improved version was published in February 1992 by Electronic Arts. It has different music, introductions, and adds pupils to the boxers' eyes. The FM Towns Marty version is based on this version, but with higher quality sound.

== Reception ==
Computer Gaming World wrote that the polygon graphics were strange-looking but very accurately modeled boxers' bodies and punches. The magazine concluded that "4D Boxing is an excellent and thoroughly enjoyable game with an effective representation of boxing skills ... a welcome and often-played addition to any sports game library". That year the magazine named it one of the year's best sports games.

In 1994, PC Gamer US named 4D Boxing the 47th best computer game ever.
