= Inindo: Way of the Ninja =

1991 video game

- North American SNES box art
- Developer: Koei
- Publisher: Koei
- Platforms: PC-8801SR, PC-9801, MSX2, FM Towns, X68000, MS-DOS (Chinese), Super NES, Windows
- Release: JP: 1991; NA: March 1993
- Genre: Role-playing
- Mode: Single-player

Inindo: Way of the Ninja (伊忍道 打倒信長 or Inindō Datō Nobunaga, スーパー伊忍道 打倒信長 or Super Inindō Datō Nobunaga in its Super Famicom version) is a 1991 role-playing video game developed and published by Koei for the Super Famicom and Japanese home computers. Originally exclusive to Japan, the game later saw a release in North America for the Super Nintendo Entertainment System (SNES) in 1993. The game is a fictional account of Japan's warring states period.

== Plot ==
Set in 1582, the player assumes the role of an Iga ninja whose village has been destroyed by the conquest of the demonic warlord Oda Nobunaga. The ninja must travel across feudal Japan, enlisting the aid of numerous ninja, sages, hermits, ronin, samurai, wizards and other companions, in order to avenge his clan.

The game is a fictitious account of the end of Oda Nobunaga's campaign to conquer and unify all of Japan. The beginning of the game references the rebellion of Akechi Mitsuhide at Honnō-ji Temple, where the historical Nobunaga died by committing seppuku. The time of the game over point (the year 1601) would be just prior to the birth of the Tokugawa shogunate under Tokugawa Ieyasu.

== Gameplay ==
The actual game begins in the year 1582. If the player does not kill Nobunaga by the end of year 1601, the game is over.

Several hazardous dungeons stand in the path of victory, as well as a selection of optional dungeons which can be played in any order the player chooses. There are 18 dungeons overall. Encounters with monsters and outlaws occur randomly in dungeons and in the game's world map, during which the player characters and NPCs can move around the battlefield in turn-based fashion to attack, cast magic spells and use items.

To complete the game, the player must recruit NPCs in order to successfully survive dungeons and large scale battles. In order to recruit other characters, the player must build up a certain degree of trust by talking with them at tea houses and inns. Most of the NPCs can be recruited: characters of rival clans are not likely to join the player.

There are strategy and war simulation elements to game as well. By gaining the trust of a Japanese feudal lord (by spying or committing acts of sabotage on competing daimyo), the player can join in the battle for the provinces that characterized the era. The outcome of these battles changes the lords' possession of individual provinces, which can alter the outcome of the game and aid or hinder the player's progress. Neighboring provinces to Nobunaga's must be conquered in order to advance to the final section of the game.

In the middle of the stories, the player follows either the "normal" path or the "magician" path, which is randomly selected after completing the first dungeon quest. Each path leads to different enemies during random encounters. For example, the "magician" path causes Western mythological monsters such as Hellhound or Marchosias to appear.

Due to the smaller resolution of the SNES, character names were shortened:

Japanese class name	English class name
忍者	Ninja
僧侶	Sage
道士	Wizard
侍	Warrior
伊賀忍者	Iga Ninja
甲賀忍者	Koga Ninja
伊賀女	Female Iga Ninja
甲賀女	Female Koga Ninja
風魔衆	Fuma Ninja
根来衆	Negoro Ninja
僧侶	Mendicant
僧兵	Sohei
山伏	Hermit
羅漢	Sage
道士	Mystic
方士	Magician
飯綱使い	Sorcerer
武士	Samurai
浪人	Ronin
剣術家	Swordsman

== Windows version ==
The Chinese version was ported to MS-DOS in 1993, playable in English OS. In 2003, the PC-9801 version of the game was ported to Windows 98, as part of Koei 25th Anniversary Pack Vol.1; a standalone version was published in 2005. The Windows version runs the PC-9801 game in emulator; when saving, the emulator emulates drive switching operation. The port requires the use of mouse and the third scenario is inaccessible because of running in emulated environment.

== Reception ==
GamePro review called Inindo "an impressive mix of adventure, fantasy, and epic military strategy", "a good RPG, featuring myth, magic, mayhem, and history" and "a great fantasy".

== See also ==
- Shinobido: Way of the Ninja
