= Heaven & Earth (video game) =

1992 video game

- Developer: Software Resources International Software
- Publisher: Buena Vista Software
- Producer: Brad Fregger
- Designers: Michael Feinberg; Scott Kim
- Programmers: Michael Sandige (MS-DOS); Ian Gilman (Mac)
- Artist: Mark J. Ferrari
- Composer: Richard Marriott
- Platforms: MS-DOS, Classic Mac OS, FM Towns
- Release: 1992; 34 years ago
- Genre: Puzzle
- Mode: Single-player

Heaven & Earth is a puzzle video game developed by Software Resources International and published by Buena Vista Software in 1992.

== Plot ==
Heaven & Earth is a game which integrates aspects of toys and puzzles, and involves a fantasy legend. With the randomly drawn animated cards in a solitaire-like game, the player tries to score the highest value tricks. The game features a dozen options for puzzles to play with, including sliders and mazes as well as 3-D illusions. The game also includes a toy aspect involves picking gems using a swinging pendulum.

== Reception ==
Computer Gaming World stated "it's refreshing to come across a little gem like Heaven & Earth, which isn't quite like anything else out there". The magazine concluded that it "is a terrific game for people who like puzzles, especially visual ones". The game was reviewed in 1994 in Dragon #211 by Jay & Dee in the "Eye of the Monitor" column. Jay gave the game 4 out of 5 stars, while Dee gave the game 3½ stars.
