= Operation Europe: Path to Victory =

1993 video game

Operation Europe: Path to Victory Europa Sensen
- North American Genesis cover art
- Developer: Koei
- Publisher: Koei
- Platforms: Super NES, Genesis, MS-DOS, NEC PC-9801, FM Towns
- Release: Super NES: NA: June 1994; JP: January 16, 1993; Genesis: JP: January 16, 1993; NA: 1994; MS-DOS: NA: 1994
- Genre: Turn-based strategy
- Modes: Single-player, multiplayer

Operation Europe: Path to Victory, released in Japan as Europa Sensen (ヨーロッパ戦線), is a combat strategy video game for multiple platforms where one or two players can compete in World War II action. The MS-DOS version of the game was only released to North America.

== Gameplay ==
The object of the game is to fulfill any one of the military objectives for either the Axis or the Allied forces. Players engage in modern warfare around Western Europe, Eastern Europe, Central Europe, and North Africa. This game uses abstract numbers and figures in the map view and saves the concrete illustrations of soldiers only when they lock horns on the battlefield or in an urban setting. Urban settings give a traditional 1930s view of housing and office buildings that provide extra protection for units that are guarding them. However, there are massive numbers to crunch and the lack of graphics help enhance the number crunching ability of game's artificial intelligence.

As a way to utilize the Nobunaga's Ambition video game engine while simulating modern warfare, each general's statistics are completely randomized by a roulette system. 84 different characters are used for generals, including those from the American television show Combat!. Examples of non-fictional characters include Adolf Hitler, Josef Stalin and Walter Bedell Smith.

Weapons are automatically replenished at the end of each scenario. Units cannot be built from scratch; they must be requested from the head of the brigade instead.

The Japanese version of the game has four game modes: Campaign, demonstration, one player game and two-player game. In the Campaign mode, the player can only play the Germans. Starting this mode with the invasion of France, the German army continues fighting in Africa, and so on, ending with Berlin defense. Officers gain experience in every scenario, retaining it after winning the battle. The troops are often replaced by the same type (one of: Infantry, Artillery, Howitzers and Reactive Artillery, Tanks and Self-Propelled Artillery, Armored Infantry Carriers, Mechanized Units). Most often give stronger instead of weaker or make up losses in the battalion for the strong units. Although the campaign mode is not directly available in the US version of the game, it is still present in the game. All the text is translated, all needed graphics present, and the formulas for calculating the quantity and quality of units operate. This allows the game to be patched and enable to Campaign mode.

== Reception ==
Reception

Review score
Publication	Score
Mega	25%

Reviewing the SNES version, GamePro applauded the intelligent AI (stating "even if you don't have a friend to go head-to-head with, the game is still enjoyable and challenging") and the huge amount of content, arguing that the six scenarios essentially amount to six complete games on a single cart. Though noting that its lack of action gameplay would make it unappealing to the average gamer, they concluded that "its challenging strategy" will attract fans of WWII stuff.
