= Stunt Driver =

1990 video game

- North American cover art
- Developer(s): Sphere, Inc.
- Publisher(s): Spectrum HoloByte
- Platform(s): MS-DOS
- Release: 1990
- Genre(s): Racing
- Mode(s): Single-player, multiplayer

Stunt Driver (also known as Crash Course in some European releases) is a polygonal racing game released for MS-DOS in 1990. It has a feature set similar to Brøderbund's Stunts published the same year, including a track editor, and both games have much in common with Hard Drivin', the Atari Games 3D stunt driving simulator released in February 1989.

== Gameplay ==
Approaching the loop

Stunt Driver allows the user to create a racetrack from components such as draw-bridges, banked curves, oil slicks, water hazards, and loops, then race on them alone, against computer-controlled opponents, or against another user via a modem or null-modem connection. It allows viewing and editing of replays using different cameras, another feature shared with Stunts.

== Reception ==
Computer Gaming World praised Stunt Driver's game play and performance, sound card audio, and extensive customization options, and stated that it was a good computer counterpart to Atari's Hard Drivin' arcade game.

== See also ==
- Hard Drivin' (1989)
- Stunt Car Racer (1989)
- Stunts (1990)
