= FM Towns Marty =

Japanese video game console

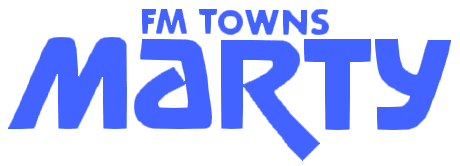

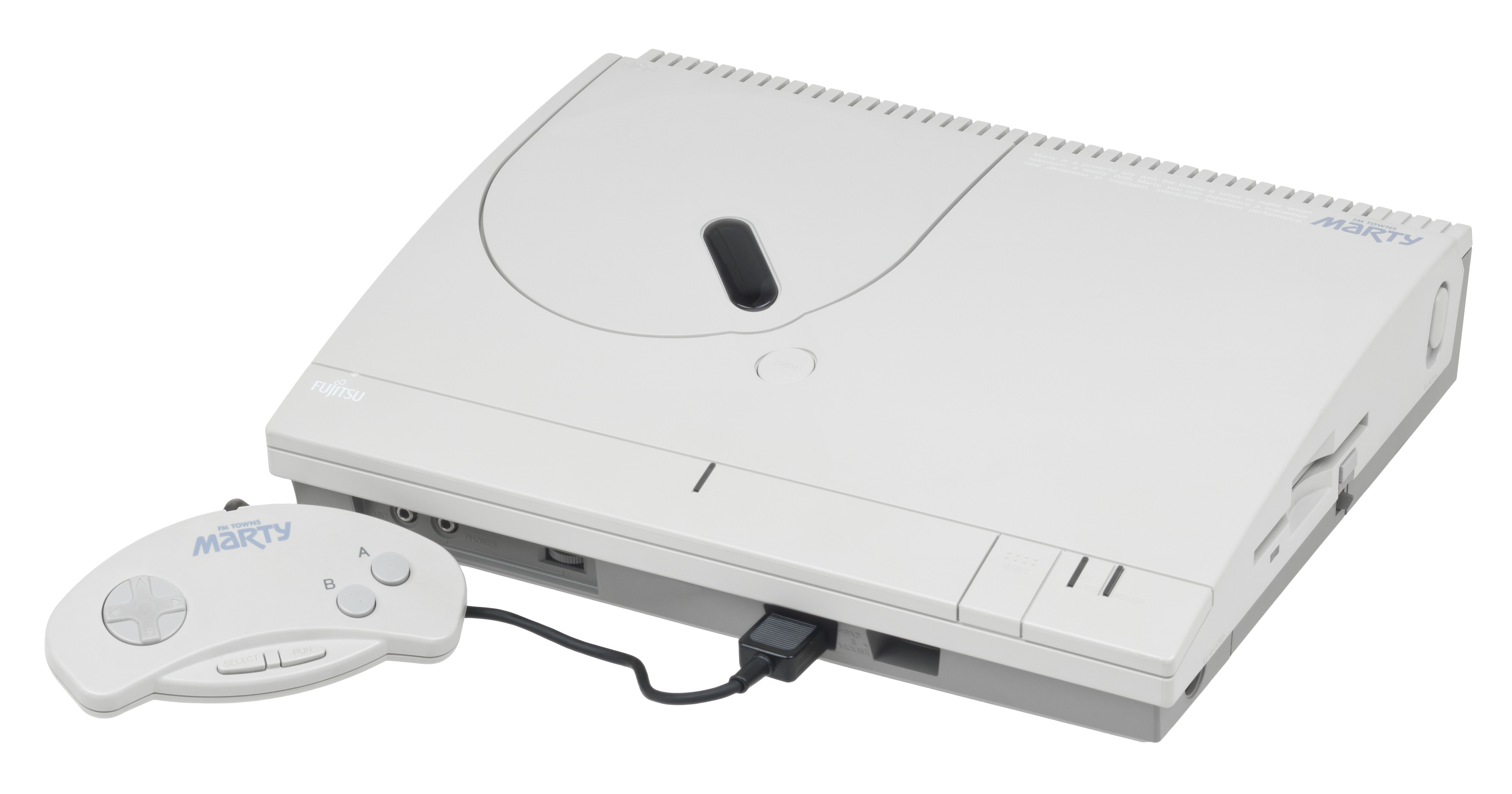
- Shown with controller
- Manufacturer: Fujitsu
- Type: Home video game console
- Generation: Fifth
- Released: JP: February 20, 1993
- Introductory price: ¥98,000 (then c. US$710)
- Discontinued: JP: 1995
- Units sold: 45,000 (by December 31, 1993)
- Media: CD-ROM, 3 1/2-inch floppy disks
- Operating system: Towns OS
- CPU: AMD 386SX at 16 MHz
- Memory: 2 MB
- Display: 352×232 – 640×480 resolutions, 256 colors on-screen out of a palette of 32 768; TV composite and S-Video output
- Graphics: Fujitsu custom graphics chip
- Sound: 6 channel FM (Yamaha YM2612); 8 channel PCM (Ricoh RF5c68)
- Backward compatibility: FM Towns

The FM Towns Marty (Note: エフエムタウンズマーティー (Japanese: Efu Emu Taunzu Mātī)) is a home video game console released in 1993 by Fujitsu, exclusively for the Japanese market. It uses the AMD 386SX, a CPU that is internally 32-bit but with a 16-bit data bus. The console comes with a built-in CD-ROM drive and disk drive. It was based on the earlier FM Towns computer system Fujitsu had released in 1989. The Marty was backward-compatible with older FM Towns games.

In 1994, a new version of the console called the FM Towns Marty 2 (エフエムタウンズマーティー2, Efu Emu Taunzu Mātī Tsū) was released. It featured a darker gray shell and a lower price (¥66,000 or US$670), but was otherwise identical to the first Marty. It was widely believed that the FM Towns Marty 2 would feature similar improvements to the FM Towns 2, which had a swifter CPU than the first, but this was not the case. It has also been speculated that the Marty 2 featured an Intel 486 CPU, but this was also discovered to be false.

There is also the FM Towns Car Marty (エフエムタウンズカーマーティー, Efu Emu Taunzu Kā Mātī) for installation in automobiles. It included a built-in navigation system with audio and video guidance, and could also be detached from the car and played at home. An optional IC Card for the FM Towns Car Marty allowed it to use VICS, and was subsequently sold with a video monitor.

== Technical specifications ==
CPU
AMD 386SX processor (32-bit) @ 16 MHz (3.6 MIPS)
RAM
- Main RAM: 2 MB (2048 KB)
- Video RAM: 640 KB (512 KB VRAM, 128 KB sprite RAM)
Graphics
- GPU: Fujitsu custom graphics chip
- Display resolution: 256×240, 256×256, 320×240, 352×232, 360×240, 512×480, 640×200, 640×480, 720×480
- Bitmap background planes: 1 (with sprite plane) or 2 (without sprite plane)
  - Virtual resolution: 256×512, 512×256, 512×512, 640×819, 1024×512
  - Color palette: 4096, or 32,768, or 16,777,216
  - Colors on screen: 16, or 256, or 32,768
- Sprite foreground plane: 256×240 to 640×480 resolution, 256 colors on screen, out of 32,768 color palette
- Hardware integer zooming: 1/2× vertical, 1/2/3/4/5× horizontal
  The Marty had only composite and S-Video output; no other video connectors are possible. As some FM Towns games were VGA-only, the Marty had a 15 kHz down-scan capability for displaying on a household TV screen.
Sprites
Up to 1024 sprites, 16×16 pixels sprite size, 16 colors per sprite
Sound
- Yamaha YM2612: 6 channel FM synthesis
- Ricoh RF5c68: 8 channel PCM sampling, 10-bit audio, 19.6 kHz sample rate
- CD-DA: 1 channel PCM playback, 16-bit audio, 44.1 kHz sampling rate
Data storage
- CD-ROM, single-speed (1x)
- Internal 3.5" HD floppy drive
  Floppy disks must be formatted 1232 KiB (PC98-style). This can be done from the BIOS GUI. The Marty's disk drive does not support 1440 KiB or 720 KiB FAT-formatted 3.5" floppy disks. For a PC to be compatible with FM Towns Marty floppies it must have a disk drive, BIOS and OS that supports "3 Mode". There are also USB floppy drives that support "3 Mode".
Multi-purpose
PCMCIA type 1 slot

The Marty's IC Card slot is compatible with type 1 PCMCIA cards, including battery-backed SRAM cards (accessible from the BIOS menu) that can be mapped to a drive letter and used as a small drive. Fujitsu also officially released a PCMCIA 2400 bit/s modem (FMM-CM301) for the FM Towns Marty. This modem was bundled with the special TCMarty that also came with a printer port. While it is widely believed that the IC Card slot can be used for RAM expansions, this is not correct.

Controllers
- 4-way D-pad, A and B buttons, Select, and Run, as well as an extra button above the two "face" buttons
- 2 standard controller ports
  The controller connector is a DE-9, referred to as an "Atari Type" in Japan because it is fundamentally the same connector as an Atari 2600. The Marty's Run and Select buttons are the equivalent of pressing right and left, or up and down at the same time. A six-button controller from Fujitsu was available for use with Capcom's Street Fighter II. Capcom also released an adapter for their CPS Fighter stick which made the stick compatible with the FM Towns/Marty as well as the X68000.
- Keyboard port

== Reception ==
Despite having excellent hardware from a gameplay perspective, both the FM Towns and the FM Towns Marty were very poor sellers in Japan. They were expensive and the custom hardware meant expandability was not as easy as with DOS/V (IBM PC clones with Japanese DOS or Microsoft Windows) systems. NEC's PC98 series computers were also dominant in Japan when the FM Towns Marty was released, making it difficult to break out before the DOS/V format took control of the market. This was despite such revolutionary features as bootable CD-ROMs and a color GUI OS on the FM Towns PC, something that predated Microsoft's Windows 95 bootable CD by seven years. Software today is rare and expensive due to the low production runs. Despite backwards compatibility with most older FM Towns PC games, compatibility issues plagued the Marty as newer titles were released with the FM Towns in mind, further limiting its potential as a true "console version" of the FM Towns PC.

When Fujitsu lowered the price and released the Marty 2 sales started to increase, but the corporate attitude was that it was a lost cause, and so the system was dropped.
