= Stacie Lynn Renna =

American actress

Stacie Lynn Renna (born 1973) is an American film, television, and stage actress. She has worked in television and films since she was ten years old. In 2002, she founded the ANTG Management talent agency in Sherman Oaks, California, in which she represented approximately 75 actors for television and movie roles.

== Early life ==
Renna was born in 1973 and grew up in the Hillsborough, New Jersey section of Montgomery Township, New Jersey. She is a graduate of The High School for Performing Arts and attended DeSales University in Center Valley, Pennsylvania, where she earned a Bachelor's degree in Theatre and Publicity.

== Professional background ==
=== Theatre ===
Renna has appeared in 42 professional theater productions, including Broadway and regional theater productions. Her background in theatre includes appearing in Shakespeare's "Much Ado About Nothing", in which she portrayed Margaret, George Street Playhouse, The Kennedy Center, and Arden Theatre Company in Philadelphia, to name a few. She also appeared on Broadway in Tennessee Williams' "The Case of the Crushed Petunias", in the role of Dorothy Simple, and in "Reefer Madness" at the Manhattan Class Theatre Company, and in George Bernard Shaw's "Arms and the Man", in which she portrayed Raina. with The Pennsylvania Shakespeare Festival (as well as "Twelfth Night" and "Macbeth" as one of the three Witches.)

Renna has appeared in contemporary productions, including "Company" as April, "Little Shop of Horrors" as Audrey, Adelaide in "Guys and Dolls" (winning an Irene Ryan Award), Bonnie in "Anything Goes", Abigail in "The Crucible", and in Moss Hart and George Kaufman's "Once in a Lifetime" and "Guys and Dolls".

=== Film and television appearances ===
| Year | Title | Role | Notes | Refs |
|---|---|---|---|---|
| 1989 | Garaga | Min | Voiceover | |
| 1991 | Coronation Street | Jill Devonshire | Episode 1.3234 | |
| 1993 | Heartbeat | Mavis's Mother | Episode: A Talent for Deception | |
| 1993 | Iria: Zeiram the Animation | Iria | Voiceover | |
| 1994 | Coronation Street | Jill Devonshire | Episodes 1.3705; 1.3706 | |
| 1995 | Coronation Street | Jill Devonshire | Episode 1.3864 | |
| 1996 | Jewel BEM Hunter Lime | Lime | Voiceover | |
| 1996 | My My Mai | Mai Waku | | | |
| 1997 | Law & Order | Becky | Episode 1.4361 | |
| 1998 | All My Children | Debbie | Episode 1.9785, 1.9789. 1.1041, 1.1048, 1.1052 | |
| 1998 | Masquerade | Ayumi | Voiceover | |
| 1998 | ' The Street' | Jackie | Episode 13.6 | |
| 1998 | Feds | Lily | Episode 4.32 | |
| 1999 | Gokudo | Gin (Djin) | Voiceover | |
| 2000 | Children's Ward | Anna | Episodes 12.8; 12.9 | |
| 2001 | Nice Shot | Cynthia Stone | | |
| 2003 | Star Trek: Enterprise | Traistana | Season 2, Episode 22 | |
| 2006 | Finding Lucy | Lucille Ball | STAR | |

In addition, Renna is also credited with appearances Law & Order and All My Children, and Intimate Portrait: Lucille Ball.

=== Talent Management and Executive Recruiter ===
In 2002, Renna co-founded Act Now (ANTG), a talent management firm in Los Angeles, CA. Her firm represented about 75 television and film actors.

In 2008, Renna expanded her talent acquisition and management practice across a number of vertical industries, including Forrest Solutions (2008), Execu-Search Group (2009), and Addison Search (2010). She also started her own executive talent acquisition firm, Renna Career Services, LLC, in 2012.
