= Tenshitachi no Gogo =

1985 video game

- Developer: JAST
- Publisher: JAST
- Series: Tenshitachi no Gogo
- Platforms: NEC PC-8801, MSX
- Release: JP: May 1985
- Genres: Dating sim, eroge

Tenshitachi no Gogo (天使たちの午後; "Angels' Afternoon") is an adult-themed adventure game released by JAST, for the Japanese NEC PC-8801 and MSX computers in May 1985.

Set in a Japanese high school, the goal of the game is to seduce Yumiko Shiraishi (白石 由美子), the star of the tennis club. To seduce her, the protagonist will have to become acquainted and intimate with her friends by talking to them.

The gameplay is simple; the player interacts with the environment by typing in commands in Japanese or choosing commands from the list using the arrow keys.

The game had moderate success, leading to standalone sequels. One of the sequels, Tenshitachi no Gogo III Bangaihen (天使たちの午後III 番外編) has a cult following in South Korea.
