= Taikou Risshiden V =

Taiko Risshiden V
- Cover art for Taiko Risshiden V for the PlayStation Portable
- Developer: Koei
- Publisher: Koei
- Platforms: Microsoft Windows; PlayStation 2 PlayStation Portable
- First release: Taiko Risshiden; 13 March 1992 [PC98] 7 April 1993 [SFC] 28 May 1993 [MD] 22 July 2005 [Win] (Koei standard series)

Taikō Risshiden V (太閤立志伝 V) is the most recent title in the Japanese video game series Taikō Risshiden produced by Koei. It was released on PC and PlayStation 2 in 2004 followed by PlayStation Portable in 2009. The first title of the series was released on NEC PC-9801 in 1992 followed by Super Famicom and Genesis/Mega Drive. It was later re-released on the Wii Virtual Console on September 1, 2009, adapted from the Super Famicom version. A new version of the game, titled "Taiko Risshiden V DX", with improved graphics and 100 new character cards, was released in 2022.

The title roughly translates to "the Taikō's success story". The characters are taken from the Momoyama period in Japan. In the previous Taikō Risshiden IV, players could select a samurai, a ninja or a merchant as their character. In Taikō Risshiden V, new roles include a blademaster, a pirate, a doctor, a tea master, and a blacksmith, counting eight roles in total. The player meets various historical figures of the era in the game.

== Summary ==
The game follows the card system used in Taikō Risshiden IV, with new professions added. A number of playable warlords are expanded for each version to 800 for Windows and 860 for the PlayStation 2. Non-combat characters include foreign missionaries, monks, and wives of the military lords. There are four overseas bases that pirates and merchants can travel to: Naha (Ryukyu, now part of Japan), Busan (Korea), Ningbo (Ming China), and Luzon (in the Philippines).

The military commander graphics were changed from the manga style of version III and IV to a graphic novel, or gekiga style, adopted from the format employed in a title named Nobunaga's Ambition. While each of the internal affairs and training sessions were presented in mini-games in Taikō Risshiden IV, in this version it is possible to opt out and skip those mini-games. However, when the player skips those mini-games, technical points will not be gained on ability score, and there are events that the player is challenged with the mini-games, even when opted to skip them. Like the previous PlayStation 2 version, players on Windows will gain new modes according to the number of cards gained during the play. The function to edit warlord data is employed when all docks are collected, to replace the Power Up Kit used in other Koei titles.

When creating a special commander or warrior, the player designs the appearance. For instance, the player chooses and arranges facial features, props, and clothing that are not available to choose from among preset outlooks. It is in this version that a female warlord can be chosen for the first time, as well as the player being able to register and maneuver up to 40 characters along with the main warlord at the same time.

== Track listing ==
Taikou Rissiden V: — Original Game Soundtrack
No.	Title	Writer(s)	Length
1.	"Opening"	KOEI OST	?
2.	"Peace Paradise"	KOEI OST	?
3.	"Flight"	KOEI OST	?
4.	"I Dreamed of Success"	KOEI OST	?
5.	"When the remaining in Obscurity"	KOEI OST	?
6.	"Makkah Profitable"	KOEI OST	?
7.	"Way of Merchant"	KOEI OST	?
8.	"I Live in Darkness"	KOEI OST	?
9.	"Law of the Shinobi"	KOEI OST	?
10.	"Beach Song"	KOEI OST	?
11.	"Live in the Sea"	KOEI OST	?
12.	"The "Peace""	KOEI OST	?
13.	"City of Eternal"	KOEI OST	?
14.	"Evaluation"	KOEI OST	?
15.	"The Heart of Wabi Sabi"	KOEI OST	?
16.	"To One Cup of Choi"	KOEI OST	?
17.	"House of Foreigner"	KOEI OST	?
18.	"The "One Country To the Outside""	Koei OST	?
19.	"Pomp and Circumstance"	Koei OST	?
20.	"Decisive Battle Emergency"	Koei OST	?
21.	"The Ends of the Offense and Defense"	Koei OST	?
22.	"Life and Death"	Koei OST	?
23.	"The "Do shave or Ride""	Koei OST	?
24.	""Pathetique""	Koei OST	?
25.	""Hope""	Koei OST	?
26.	""Determination""	Koei OST	?
27.	""Crisis""	Koei OST	?
28.	""The enemy Hon'noji""	Koei OST	?
29.	"Small Happiness"	Koei OST	?
30.	"I Do Sanra Emergency"	Koei OST	?
31.	"A Dream"	Koei OST	?
32.	"And to Tenkaichi"	Koei OST	?
33.	"No Regrets In My Life"	Koei OST	?
34.	"Kenzen Oneness"	Koei OST	?
35.	"Ending"	Koei OST	?
Total length:			42:13

== List of games ==
- Taiko Risshiden – PC 1992, Genesis May 28, 1993
- Taiko Risshiden II – PlayStation February 23, 1996, PC
- Taiko Risshiden III – PC March 5, 1999, PlayStation August 19, 1999
- Taiko Risshiden IV – PC June 1, 2001, PlayStation Portable August 31, 2006
- Taiko Risshiden V – PC March 12, 2004, PlayStation Portable September 17, 2009
