= Life & Death II: The Brain =

1990 video game

- Developer: The Software Toolworks
- Publisher: The Software Toolworks
- Series: Life & Death
- Platforms: MS-DOS, PC-98
- Release: 1990

Life & Death II: The Brain is a 1990 video game published by The Software Toolworks.

== Gameplay ==
Life & Death II: The Brain is a game in which the player is a neurosurgery intern performing operations in a teaching hospital.

In this sequel to Life & Death, the player is a neurosurgeon.

== Reception ==
Dr. Jesse W. Chen reviewed the game for Computer Gaming World, and stated that "Life & Death II: The Brain is not simply humorous entertainment, but it has educational value as well. It will take players some time to absorb the fundamentals of neurological conditions and surgical techniques, but it is time well spent."

Les Ellis for Raze rated the game 87% overall and said "if you're not quite up to the calibre of surgeon required for such a demanding job, you could always try out for that vacancy down at the morgue."

Rik Haynes for ACE (Advanced Computer Entertainment) rated the game 799 and said "I spent more time back in the classroom than I did curing patients. Once you've reached the top of your profession and successfully performed your first brain-job, there is little left to come back to."
