= Stunts (video game) =

1990 video game

- North American cover art
- Developer: Distinctive Software
- Publishers: US: Broderbund; EU: Mindscape
- Producer: Rob Martyn
- Designers: Brad Gour; Kevin Pickell; Don Mattrick; Rob Martyn
- Programmer: Kevin Pickell
- Artists: Mike Smith; David Adams; Nicola Swain; Kevil Pickell
- Platforms: MS-DOS, Amiga, NEC PC-9801, FM Towns
- Release: October 1990: MS-DOS; 1992: Amiga; 1993: PC-98, FM Towns
- Genre: Racing
- Mode: Single-player

Stunts (also known as 4D Sports: Driving) is a 3D racing video game developed by Distinctive Software and published by Broderbund in 1990. The game places emphasis on racing on stunt tracks and features a track editor. It is influenced by the arcade game Hard Drivin' (1989).

== Gameplay ==
The track editor

In Stunts, players race a lap around the circuit, with the aim of completing the lap as quickly as possible without crashing. These laps often feature special track areas such as loops, jumps (including over tall buildings), slalom roads and corkscrews. The square-shaped game area where the track is built is surrounded by a fence that prevents the player from leaving. Players can either race against the clock or choose between six different opponents; there is no support for real-time multiplayer. Stunts features 11 different drivable cars, with either automatic or manual transmission. Replays of races can be saved and reviewed. There are four camera views available during replay and actual driving, and the dashboard is an optional overlay on all views. It is also possible to continue the race from any point in the replay, but the time for that race will not be recorded. Another major feature of the game is the built-in track and terrain editor which allows the user to design arbitrary new tracks or modifications of existing tracks.

The cars can drive on paved roads, gravel roads, icy/snow roads, and grass if driving off the track — which all offer different levels of grip. The game has a relatively advanced pseudo-physics engine for its time which can simulate oversteer and understeer; the grip is also proportional to the banking of a curve. The game features a 3D engine with flat shading and no textures, it uses polygonal graphics for most objects, including trees and road signs, there are few sprites. The resolution is 320×200 with 256 colors. There is an option to select high and low detail. The game is written for DOS and executes in real mode.

Stunts includes a form of copy protection. Each time after running the program, players must complete a specific phrase found in the game manual before being allowed to race. If the player fails to complete the phrase three times, the next race will still load, but approximately four seconds into the race, the player is informed that they did not deactivate the car's security system, the car crashes, and the player is returned to the main menu.

== Development ==
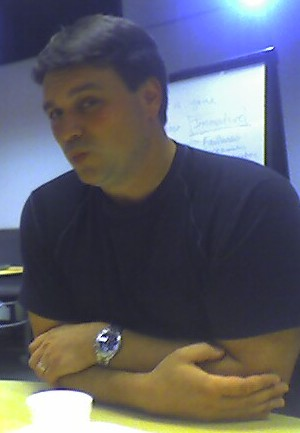
Programmer Chris Taylor would portray Skid Vicious in the game.

Stunts was developed by Distinctive Software, a video game design company that was established in 1982 and based in Burnaby, British Columbia, Canada. Prior to the release of Stunts the company had developed other racing games such as Test Drive (1987), The Duel: Test Drive II (1989) and Grand Prix Circuit (1988).

The popularity of the arcade game Hard Drivin' (1989) from Atari Games led to new style of driving-themed games where vehicles are either greatly modified or could perform incredible stunts. This led to similarly themed games such as the arcade game Race Drivin' (1990) and personal computer (PC) games which included Stunt Driver (1990) and Stunts. Designer Kevin P. Pickell said Stunts initially began as what he described as "a smash-up derby game in an arena". Progress on this format for the game was halted as cars predominantly drove backwards in demolition derbies, making it difficult to execute a 3D game where the player was primarily driving in reverse.

Don Mattrick of Distinctive Software acknowledged the influence of Hard Drivin', saying they had and adapted what they liked from the game. Pickell echoed this, saying that he felt he could not "be as good as that game", stating that arcade hardware led the market in terms of visual quality, but said that what they could do was include a track editor that would set the game apart and make it a very different experience from Hard Drivin'. The track editor in the game was initially a tool Pickell used to design the default tracks in the game. Pickell continued discussing the 3D graphics in the game, stating that textured rendering would be too slow to process at the time, which led to making the game use a general single-colour convex polygons which would render the graphics through code run by the CPU. This was done as using a graphics card would not be a viable option during that period.

Stunts uses an unrealistic game engine by design, with the idea that landing from jumps that would easily crash a real car did not sacrifice enjoyment for players. Pickell said there were many glitches in the physics engine of the game, such as being able to brake when in mid-air which were known by the developers and left in the game intentionally. Pickell responded to them saying that most of the glitches in the game were known but the team did not have time to fix them. Other known issues in the game that made it to release was the opponents controlled by the computer. Pickel said that it was difficult to have the drivers even stay on the road and it was not difficult to design a track where they would get confused on where to go. Some of the characters in the game were programmers such as Chris Taylor, who portrayed Skid Vicious.

The game has a replay mode to showcase up to ten minutes of footage from a race. The code saves the compressed key or joystick inputs and plays them back with different camera angles.

== Release ==
Stunts was released in 1990 for MS-DOS compatible operating systems and was published in the United States by Broderbund. It was Distinctive Software's first game to be published by the company. When looking for distributors in other territories, the game had to be renamed as Broderbund had the rights to the name Stunts. While promoted under the title Skid Marks, the game was eventually released as 4D Sports Driving in European markets. Distinctive Software chose the latter title as they had a game titled 4D Sports Boxing (1991) which they used as the basis for the 4D Sports Driving title. 4D Sports Driving was based on the version 1.1 of Stunts, which featured a few minor tweaks. The game was later ported to the Amiga, FM Towns and NEC PC-9801.

The Amiga version was published in 1992 by Mindscape under the name 4D Sports Driving (version 1.2). SFX and music are played with samples instead of FM synthesis or PC speaker.

The PC-9801 version was titled 4D Driving (version 1.0) and was published by Electronic Arts Victor in 1993. Due to PC-9801 limitations, this version had the music synthesized and title and menu graphics changed from the previous platform's releases, although the gameplay remained mainly the same.

FM Towns version is also named 4D Driving (version 1.0) and was also published by Electronic Arts Victor in 1993. Due to FM Towns capacities, music has been changed and improved, and new songs added. Title page and menu graphics are also modified, close to PC-9801 version but with better graphics. In FM Towns version, the opponent's photos has been changed, and Bernie Rubber character is replaced by Masahiko, a Japanese guy. His dedicated track remains the same as Bernie's track.

While working on a library for the Sega Genesis system, Pickell applied the library to convert Stunts to work on the video game console. He said there was no plans to actually publish the game for the system and that he would want to make the frame rate better if they were ever planning to publish it.

== Reception ==
Contemporary ratings

Review scores
Publication	Score
ACE	4/5
Games-X	3.5/5
Zero	83/100

Duncan MacDonald of Zero compared the game to similar racing games of the period. On reviewing 4-D Sports Driving and Crash Course (1990), describing them both as video game clones of Hard Drivin'. MacDonald found the latter game to be the superior of the two titles as stating that 4-D Sports Driving was a strong title only let down by "jerky graphics". Ultimately, MacDonald found the game superior to Hard Drivin', but inferior to Indianapolis 500: The Simulation (1989). Reviewing the game for the Amiga, a reviewer in Games-X complimented the games sound and suggested players to use the keyboard to control as the mouse and joystick were very insensitive. The reviewer praised the track editor as a highlight, commenting that "without it the lasting appeal would be very thin on the ground."

Michael Himowitz of the Baltimore Evening Sun included both Stunts and Stunt Driver (1990) on his list of the best games of the year, finding them both to be similar games with high quality sound, 3D graphics, and "spectacular crashes." In 1994, PC Gamer US named Stunts the 22nd best computer game ever. The editors wrote that the sense of speed, and the degree of control the players have over their vehicle, make this a must for every gamer.

Retrospective ratings

Review score
Publication	Score
AllGame	4.5/5

From retrospective reviews, Chris Couper of the website AllGame complimented the game for its general gameplay, the ability to create your own courses and the replay function which he described as "a truly innovative touch." He suggested the game was most fun when not playing the game as dictated. He found the most fun was had attempting to exploit the glitches in the game, such as when a car would shoot directly into the sky after crashing which led to "Many hours spent with friends seeing who could launch a car the furthest." In article published in Retro Gamer magazine in 2008, Tim Henderson gave an overview of Stunts saying that while its graphics had quickly dated due to a lack of texture mapping, the game remained "incredible fun to actually play." He highlighted the track editor in Stunts as what gave the game its lasting appeal and giving it "a surprising amount of long-term robustness".

== Legacy ==
Stunts continued to have a player base decades after the games release. A fan community surrounding the game involving racing and recording replays to compete with other players and show off their skills. As Stunts allows players to rewind their gameplay during a lap via the instant replay option, it allowed players dexterity to try and find the best routes. In the mid-2000s, the game grew popular enough to have a yearly World Stunts Meeting where players would get together in person to throw parties and play live races.

== See also ==
- Stunt Car Racer (1989)
