= Texture memory =

Type of digital storage

Texture memory is a type of digital storage that makes texture data readily available to video rendering processors (also known as GPUs), typically 3D graphics hardware. It was sometimes implemented as specialized RAM (TRAM) that is designed for rapid reading and writing, enabling the graphics hardware increased performance in rendering 3D imagery. Modern GPUs have one kind of RAM for all kinds of buffers, although textures might still have a dedicated cache.

Larger amounts of texture memory allow for more detailed scenes.
