= FM Towns =

Japanese personal computer

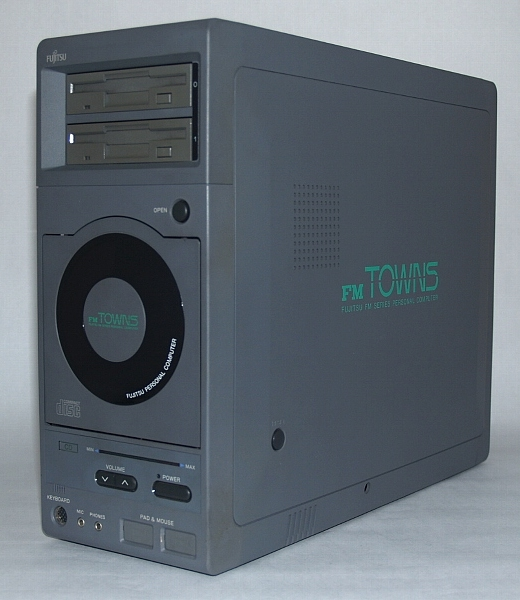
- FM Towns Model 2F
- Developer: Fujitsu
- Manufacturer: Fujitsu
- Product family: FM Towns
- Generation: Fourth Generation
- Released: JP: February 28, 1989
- Lifespan: 1989–1997
- Discontinued: Summer 1997
- Units sold: 500,000
- Media: Compact disc
- Operating system: Towns OS, Windows 3.1, Windows 95
- CPU: Intel 386DX @ 16 MHz
- Display: 320×200 - 720×512 resolutions, 256 colors on-screen out of a palette of 32 768
- Graphics: Fujitsu custom graphics chip
- Sound: Ricoh RF5c68; Yamaha YM2612
- Power: 100 VAC ～
- Related: FM Towns Marty

The FM Towns (Japanese: エフエムタウンズ, Hepburn: Efu Emu Taunzu) is a Japanese personal computer built by Fujitsu from 1989 to 1997. It started as a proprietary PC variant intended for multimedia applications and PC games, but later became more compatible with IBM PC compatibles. In 1993, the FM Towns Marty was released; it is a game console compatible with existing FM Towns games.

The "FM" part of the name means "Fujitsu Micro" like their earlier products, while the "Towns" part is derived from the code name the system was assigned while in development, "Townes". This refers to Charles Townes, one of the winners of the 1964 Nobel Prize in Physics, following a custom of Fujitsu at the time to code name PC products after Nobel Prize winners. The e in "Townes" was dropped when the system went into production to make it clearer that the term was to be pronounced like the word "towns" rather than the potential "tow-nes".

== History ==
Fujitsu decided to release a new home computer after the FM-7 was technologically overcome by NEC's PC-8801. During the life of the FM-7, Fujitsu learned that software sales drove hardware sales, and in order to acquire usable software quickly, the new computer was to be based on Fujitsu's "FM R" system architecture. The FM R, released in 1987, was another x86/DOS-based platform similar to NEC's popular PC-9801. The FM-R computers were sold with moderate success in Japanese offices, particularly in Japanese government offices. There were hundreds of software packages available for the FM R, including Lotus 1-2-3, WordStar, Multiplan, and dBASE III. With this basis of compatibility, the more multimedia-friendly FM Towns was created.

NEC's PC-9801 computers were widespread and dominated in the 1980s, at one point reaching 70% of the 16/32-bit computer market, but the early models had limited graphics (640×400 with 16 of 4096 colors) and sounds (4-operator/3 voice monaural FM sounds + 3 channel SSG sounds). Just as Commodore saw an opening for the Amiga in some global markets against the IBM PC, a computer with improved graphics and sound was considered to overcome the PC-9801 in the home-use field in Japan.

With many multimedia innovations for its time, the FM Towns was that system, though for a number of reasons it never broke far beyond the boundaries of its niche market status.

Eventually, the FM Towns lost much of its uniqueness by adding a DOS/V (PC clone plus DOS with native Japanese language support) compatibility mode switch, until Fujitsu finally discontinued making FM Towns specific hardware and software and moved to focus on the IBM PC clones (Fujitsu FMV) that many Japanese manufacturers - who previously were not players in the PC market - were building by the mid to late 1990s. To this day, Fujitsu is known for its laptop PCs globally, and FM Towns (and Marty) users have been relegated to a small community of aficionados.

== Overview ==
Several variants were built; the first system (FM TOWNS model1 and model2) is based on an Intel 80386DX processor running at a clock speed of 16 MHz, with the option of adding an 80387 FPU, features one or two megabytes of RAM (with a possible maximum of 6 MB), one or two 3.5" floppy disk drives, a PCMCIA memory card slot and a single-speed CD-ROM drive. Its package includes a gamepad, a mouse and a microphone.

The earlier, more distinctive models featuring a vertical CD-ROM tray on the front of the case (model1, model2, 1F, 2F, 1H, 2H, 10F and 20F) were often referred to as the "Gray" Towns, and were the ones most directly associated with the "FM Towns" brand. Most featured 3 memory expansion slots and used 72-pin non-parity SIMMs with a required timing of 100ns or less and a recommended timing of 60ns.

Hard drives are not standard equipment, and are not required for most uses. The OS is loaded from CD-ROM by default. A SCSI Centronics 50/SCSI-1/Full-Pitch port is provided for connecting external SCSI disk drives, and is the most common way to connect a hard drive to an FM Towns PC. Although internal drives are rare, there is a hidden compartment with a SCSI 50-pin connector where a hard drive may be connected, but the power supply module does not typically provide the required Molex connector to power the drive.

The video output is 15 kHz RGB (though some programs used a 31 kHz mode) using the same DA15 connector and pinouts as the PC-9801.

=== Operating system ===
The operating system used is Windows 3.0/3.1/95 and a graphical OS called Towns OS, based on MS-DOS and the Phar Lap DOS extender (RUN386.EXE). Most games for the system were written in protected mode Assembly and C using the Phar Lap DOS extender. These games usually utilize the Towns OS API (TBIOS) for handling several graphic modes, sprites, sounds, a mouse, gamepads, and CD-audio.

The FM Towns is capable of booting its graphical Towns OS straight from CD in 1989 - two years before Amiga CDTV booted its GUI-based AmigaOS 1.3 from internal CD drive and the CD-bootable System 7 was released for the Macintosh in 1991, and five years before the El Torito specification standardized boot-CDs on IBM PC compatibles in 1994.

To boot the system from CD-ROM, the FM TOWNS has a "hidden C:" ROM drive in which a minimum MS-DOS system, CD-ROM driver and MSCDEX.EXE are installed. This minimal system runs first which reads and executes the Towns OS IPL stored in CD-ROM after that. The Towns OS CD-ROM has an IPL, MS-DOS system (IO.SYS), DOS extender, and Towns API (TBIOS).

A minimal system that allows the CD-ROM drive to be accessed is contained in a system ROM; this, coupled with Fujitsu's decision to charge only a minimal license fee for the inclusion of a bare-bones Towns OS on game CD-ROMs, allows game developers to make games bootable directly from CD-ROM without the need for a boot floppy or hard disk.

Various Linux and BSD distributions have also been ported to the FM Towns system, including Debian and Gentoo.

=== Graphics ===
The FM Towns features a custom Fujitsu graphics chip, enabling video modes ranging from 320×200 to 720×512 resolutions, with 16 to 32,768 simultaneous colors out of a possible 4096 to 16 million (depending on the video mode); most of these video modes have two memory pages, and it allows the use of up to 1024 sprites of 16×16 pixels each. It also has a built-in font ROM for the display of kanji characters.

The system has the ability to overlay different video modes; for example, the 320×200 video mode with 32,768 colors can be overlaid with a 640×480 mode using 16 colors, which allows games to combine high-color graphics with high-resolution kanji text.

It uses 640 KB of video RAM, including 512 KB VRAM and 128 KB sprite RAM.

Sprite layer:

- Resolution: 256×240 pixels
- Colors: 256 on screen out of 32,768 palette
- Sprite RAM: 128 KB (8 KB attributes, 120 KB pattern/colour data)
- Maximum sprite count: Up to 1024 on screen
- Sprite size: 16×16 pixels
- Colors per sprite: 16
- Overlay support: Bitmap modes 1-11

Up to two graphical layers can be overlaid, whether it is two bitmap layers, or the sprite layer with a bitmap background layer. The latter is useful for action games, though the sprite function is not as advanced as that of rival 32-bit computer, the Sharp X68000. When the sprite layer is used, it is rendered to VRAM layer 1 on top, with the bitmap background as VRAM layer 0 below. When two bitmap layers are used, then both are rendered to VRAM layers 0 and 1.

=== CPU ===
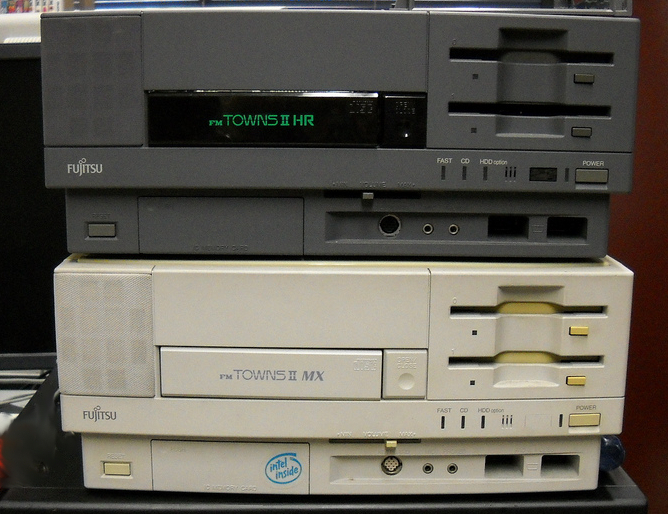
FM TOWNS II, HR and MX models

The following is a list of models and the CPUs they contain from the factory:

- 80386SX (16 MHz): UX, Marty, Marty II, Car Marty
- 80386SX (20 MHz): UG
- 80386DX (16 MHz): CX
- 80386DX (20 MHz): HG
- 80486SX (20 MHz): HR, UR
- 80486SX (25 MHz): ME
- 80486SX (33 MHz): MA, MF, Fresh, FreshTV, Fresh-T, EA
- 80486DX2 (66 MHz): MX, Fresh-E, Fresh-ES, Fresh-ET, HA
- 486DX4 (100 MHz): Fresh-FS, Fresh-FT
- Pentium (Socket 4/60 MHz): HB
- Pentium (Socket 5/90 MHz): HC

FMV Towns

- Pentium (Socket 5/90 MHz): Fresh GT, Fresh GS
- Pentium (Socket 5/120 MHz): Model H

=== Sound ===
The FM Towns system is able to play regular audio CDs, and also supports the use of 8 PCM voices and 6 FM channels, using the Ricoh RF5c68 and Yamaha YM2612 sound chips, respectively. The system has ports in the front to accommodate karaoke, LEDs to indicate volume level, and software to add popular voice-altering effects such as echoes.

Games on the FM Towns regularly use Red Book Audio CD music tracks, especially if they are designed specifically for the Fujitsu system. Games ported from the PC-9801, for instance, might have used only PCM/FM music. This was a novelty and innovation far ahead of other PCs of the time made possible by the standard CD-ROM drive found in every FM Towns computer.

==== Ricoh RF5c68 ====
The Ricoh RF5c68 is an eight-channel sound chip developed by Ricoh. It is notably used in Fujitsu's FM Towns computer series, along with Sega's System 18 and System 32 arcade game system boards.

The RF5c68 supports eight 8-bit PCM channels, with 19.6 kHz or variable sampling rate. Audio bit depth ranges from 8-bit to 10-bit.

== See also ==
- List of FM Towns games
- FM-8
- FM-7
- FM-11
- FM-16β
- FM Towns Marty
