= List of X68000 games =

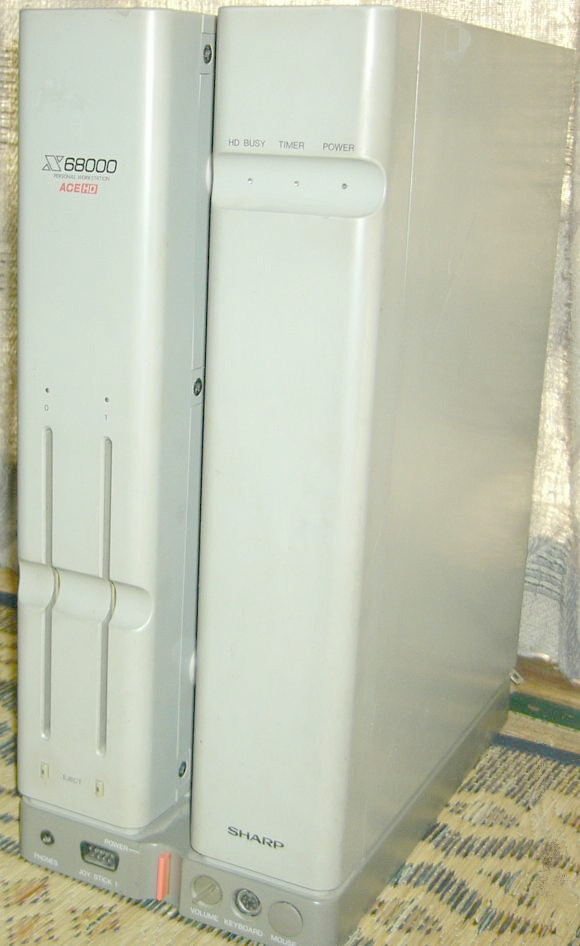
A Sharp X68000ACE-HD model

The X68000 is a home computer developed and manufactured by Sharp Corporation, first released only in Japan on March 28, 1987. It was the second and last computer to be released under the Sharp brand, succeeding the X1 series. The following list contains commercial games and a selection of doujin and amateur games released for the X68000 platform.

Featuring an operating system written by Hudson Soft called Human68k and bundled with a conversion of Konami's 1987 arcade game Gradius as the pack-in game at launch, the X68000 was very similar to arcade system boards of the time in terms of hardware and served as the development machine for Capcom's CP System. Many add-ons were released including networking, SCSI, memory upgrades, CPU enhancements and MIDI I/O boards, among others that increased the performance of the system. Multiple revisions were later released that included several enhancements compared to the original model, with the last model being released in 1993 before being officially discontinued in the market, though games for the platform kept being created. Games were also distributed through the Takeru software vending machines, which allowed users to write commercial titles or dōjin soft on blank 5.25" floppy disks. Originally released at JP¥369,000, later models were sold for considerably lower prices. It is unknown how many X68000 units were sold in total during its commercial life span.

== Commercial games ==
There are currently 657 commercial games in this section. (Note: These counts are automatically generated by Template:Table row counter.)

- 0–9
- A
- B
- C
- D
- E
- F
- G
- H
- I
- J
- K
- L
- M
- N
- O
- P
- Q
- R
- S
- T
- U
- V
- W
- X
- Y
- Z

Commercial X68000 games
Title	Developer(s)	Publisher(s)	Release date(s)
3-Ta Kun	Active Software	Active Software	1991-07-19
38 man Kiro no Kokū	System Sacom	System Sacom	1989-10-21
38 man Kiro no Kokū: CM-64-ban	System Sacom	System Sacom	1989-12
2069 A.D.	Home Data	Home Data	1991-08-09
A Jax	SPS	Konami	1989-11-29
A-Ressha de Ikō II	Artdink	Artdink	1988-09-10
A-Ressha de Ikō III	Artdink	Brother Kōgyō	1991-04-24
Abunai Tengu Densetsu	Alice Soft	Alice Soft	1989-12-15
Advanced Dungeons & Dragons: DragonStrike	Westwood Associates	Pony Canyon	1992-03-31
After Burner	Dempa	Dempa	1989-04-26
Air Combat: Yūgeki Ō 2	SystemSoft	SystemSoft	1990-09-21
Air Management: Ōzora ni Kakeru	Koei	Koei	1992-11-20
Aki to Tsukasa no Fushigi no Kabe	New System House Oh!	New System House Oh!	1988-09
Akiko Premium Version	Red-Zone	FairyTale	1993-02-10
Akumajō Dracula	Konami	Konami	1993-07-23
Albion: Hakua no Kishi Densetsu	Chaos	Chaos	1989-12-07
Alfaim	Zainsoft	Zainsoft	1989-12-14
Algarna	M.N.M Software	Brother Kōgyō	1991-02-08
Alice no Yakata	Alice Soft	Alice Soft	1990-03-15
Alice no Yakata II	Alice Soft	Alice Soft	1992-08-15
Alice Tachi no Gogo Vol. 1	System House Oh!	System House Oh!	1989-12-12
Alice Tachi no Gogo Vol. 2	System House Oh!	System House Oh!	1989-12-12
Alien Syndrome	Dempa	Dempa	1992-03-25
Alshark	Right Stuff	Right Stuff	1991-12-06
AmbivalenZ: Niritsu Haihan	Alice Soft	Alice Soft	1994-04-28
Animahjong V3	Sogna	Sogna	1993-07-30
Ano, Subarashii o Mouichido	Mankai Seisakusho	Mankai Seisakusho	1999-09-15
Aoki Ōkami to Shiroki Mejika: Genchou Hishi	Koei	Koei	1993-02-26
Aoki Ōkami to Shiroki Mejika: Genghis Khan	Koei	Koei	1989-03
Apple Club 1: Kinjirareta Asobi Series	FairyTale	Brother Kōgyō	1989-03
Aquales	Exact	Exact	1991-09-12
Arcshu: Kagerō no Jidai o Koete	Wolf Team	Wolf Team	1990-03-27
Arcus II: Silent Symphony	Wolf Team	Wolf Team	1990-01-27
Arcus Odyssey	Wolf Team	Wolf Team	1991-06-29
Arcus Pro68K	Wolf Team	Wolf Team	1989-04-21
Arkanoid: Revenge of Doh	SPS	Sharp Corporation	1988-02
Armist	Basement	Basement	1992-11-27
Armored Trooper Votoms: Dead Ash	Family Soft	Family Soft	1991-06-20
Arquelphos	D.O. Corp.	D.O. Corp.	1993-07-16
Artemis	Birdy Soft	Birdy Soft	1991-07-25
Asuka 120% BURNING Fest.	Fill-in-Cafe	Family Soft	1994-04-22
Atomic Robo-Kid	System Sacom	System Sacom	1990-12-20
Ayumi-Chan Monogatari	Alice Soft	Alice Soft	1994-02-15
B-Field!	Studio Inferno	Brother Kōgyō	1994-03-30
Barūsa no Fukushū	Zainsoft	Zainsoft	1990-09-15
Battle Chess	Interplay Productions	Pack-In-Video	1989-12-10
Battle High School	NIC	Dot Plan	1993-03-26
Battletech: Ubawareta Seihai	Victor Musical Industries	Victor Musical Industries	1992-07-10
Be Rain	Software House Parsley	Software House Parsley	1993-05-28
Beast 2: Inkyu Buster	Birdy Soft	Birdy Soft	1992-06-10
Beast: Injū no Yakata	Birdy Soft	Birdy Soft	1991-02-19
Bell's Avenue Vol. 1	Signa Works	Wendy Magazine	1993-07-30
Bell's Avenue Vol. 2	Wendy Magazine	Wendy Magazine	1994-03
Bell's Avenue Vol. 3	Wendy Magazine	Wendy Magazine	1995-03-24
Bin Bin Mahjong: Peach Angel	Takeru Soft	Brother Kōgyō	1990-05-01
Birdy World	Birdy Soft	Birdy Soft	1992-01-15
Bishōjo Noriko	ZigZag	New System House Oh!	1989-01-20
Bishōjo Shashinkan Special: The Double Vision	HARD	HARD	1988-12
Bishōjo Tsūshin: Chat no Susume	FairyTale	Ides	1992-07-06
Blitzkrieg Tōbu Sensen 1941-45	SystemSoft	SystemSoft	1991-10-25
Blodia	Tonkin House	Broderbund Japan	1990-03-20
Bomberman	SystemSoft	SystemSoft	1991-04-19
Bomberman: Panic Bomber	Riverhillsoft	ASCII Corporation	1995-04-05
Bonanza Bros.	SPS	Sharp Corporation	1991-09-10
Bonnō Yobikō	Software House Parsley	Software House Parsley	1991-03-29
Bonnō Yobikō 2	Software House Parsley	Software House Parsley	1991-11-08
Bonnō Yobikō 3	Software House Parsley	Software House Parsley	1993-01-29
Bosconian	Dempa	Dempa	1988-12
Branmarker	D.O. Corp.	D.O. Corp.	1991-07-12
Bretonne Lays	SystemSoft	SystemSoft	1990-11-30
Bubble Bobble	Dempa	Dempa	1990-03-09
Byakuya Monogatari: Winchester Ke no Matsuei	East Cube	East Cube	1989-03
Cal	Birdy Soft	Birdy Soft	1991-01-12
Cal II	Birdy Soft	Birdy Soft	1991-04-20
Cameltry	Dempa	Dempa	1991-09-25
Can Can Bunny	Cocktail Soft	FairyTale	1990-06-29
Can Can Bunny Extra	Cocktail Soft	Ides	1993-08-06
Can Can Bunny Premier	Cocktail Soft	Ides	1992-08
Can Can Bunny Superior	Cocktail Soft	FairyTale	1990-09-25
Cannon Sight	Nihon Computer Club Renmei Kikaku	Nihon Computer Club Renmei Kikaku	1992-07
Carat: Magical Block	Cybertech Custom	Cybertech Custom	1993-07-09
Caroll	ZigZag	System House Oh!	1991-02
Casablanca ni Ai o: Satsujinsha wa Jikū o Koete	Thinking Rabbit	Thinking Rabbit	1988-12-10
Castles	Infinity Co., Ltd.	Victor Musical Industries	1992-10-23
Cat's Part-1	Cat's Pro	Cat's Pro	1993-04-28
Chase H.Q.	Tierheit	Brother Kōgyō	1992-10
Chinmoku no Kantai	G.A.M. Corporation	G.A.M. Corporation	1993-04-10
Chō Tōryū Retsuden Dino Land	Wolf Team	Brother Kōgyō	1991-11-10
Chōjin	Fix Co., Ltd.	Brother Kōgyō	1992-04-18
Chuka Taisen	SPS	Sharp Corporation	1991-01-25
Cinderella Perudue	Studio Angel	Zenryūtsū	1988-02
Code-Zero	Random House	Enix	1991-11-29
Collector D	D.O. Corp.	D.O. Corp.	1993-07-23
Collector D Bangai-hen	D.O. Corp.	D.O. Corp.	1993-08-24
Columns	SystemSoft	SystemSoft	1991-10-16
Continental	Technopolis Soft	Technopolis Soft	1992-03-20
Cosmic Psycho	Cocktail Soft	Cocktail Soft	1991-09-14
Cotton	Success	Electronic Arts Victor	1993-09-24
Crescent	Silky's	Silky's	1993-11-25
Crescent Moon Gal	Alice Soft	Alice Soft	1989-12-15
Cueb Runner	SPS	SPS	1990-02-24
Cyber Core	Alfa System	SPS	1991-10-25
Cyberblock Metal Orange EX	Cybertech Custom	Cybertech Custom	1993-01
D-Return	Nihon Computer Club Renmei Kikaku	Nihon Computer Club Renmei Kikaku	1989-03
D-Return: Tei Nanido Version	Nihon Computer Club Renmei Kikaku	Nihon Computer Club Renmei Kikaku	1989-04-01
D.P.S: Dream Program System	Alice Soft	Alice Soft	1989-12-15
D.P.S: Dream Program System SG	Alice Soft	Alice Soft	1990-10-15
D.P.S: Dream Program System SG Set 2	Alice Soft	Alice Soft	1991-05
D.P.S: Dream Program System SG Set 3	Alice Soft	Alice Soft	1991-12-15
Daikairei: Dai Nippon Teikoku Kaigun no Kiseki	Artdink	Artdink	1989-04-07
Daikairei: Nankai no Shitō	Artdink	Artdink	1989-12-08
Daikōkai Jidai	Koei	Koei	1990-12-14
Daikōkai Jidai II	Koei	Koei	1993-04-30
Daimakaimura	Capcom	Capcom	1994-04-22
Daisenryaku II: Campaign Version	SystemSoft	SystemSoft	1991-03-29
Daisenryaku III '90	Arsys Software	SystemSoft	1991-12-20
Dalk	Alice Soft	Alice Soft	1993-02-10
Dark Odyssey	Soft Plan	Soft Plan	1993-08-06
Darwin's Dilemma	Inline Design	StarCraft, Inc.	1991-09-30
Dash Yarō	SPS	Sharp Corporation	1991-05-23
Datenshi Kyōko	ZigZag	New System House Oh!	1989-01-20
De-Ja	ELF Corporation	ELF Corporation	1990-10-05
De-Ja II	ELF Corporation	ELF Corporation	1992-07-30
Dead of the Brain	FairyTale	FairyTale	1992-07
Death Brade	—N/a	SPS	1992-10-30
Death Bringer	Renovation Game	Nihon Telenet	1989-03-10
Deflektor	Bullet-Proof Software	Bullet-Proof Software	1991-08-09
Detana!! TwinBee	Konami	Konami	1991-12-06
Diat Varcs	Studio Inferno	Brother Kōgyō	1993-10-15
Die Bahnwelt	Glodia	Glodia	1992-10-30
DIOS	Zainsoft	Zainsoft	1990-01-13
Dōkeshi Satsujin Jiken: Meurtre d'un Clown	Thinking Rabbit	Thinking Rabbit	1988-10-08
Doki Doki Card League	Artist Soft	Great Co., Ltd.	1990-08-31
Dōkyūsei	ELF Corporation	ELF Corporation	1993-02-10
DOME	System Sacom	System Sacom	1988-05
DOR	D.O. Corp.	D.O. Corp.	1992-03-18
DOR Part 2	D.O. Corp.	D.O. Corp.	1992-05-19
DOR Part 3	D.O. Corp.	D.O. Corp.	1992-11-27
DOR Special Edition '93	D.O. Corp.	D.O. Corp.	1993-11-26
DOR Special Edition Sakigake	D.O. Corp.	D.O. Corp.	1993-05-21
Double Eagle	Artdink	Artdink	1988-10-20
Downtown Nekketsu Monogatari	SPS	Sharp Corporation	1990-04-21
Dr. Stop!	Alice Soft	Alice Soft	1992-05-15
Dracula Hakushaku	FairyTale	Ides	1992-12-18
Dragon	Riverhillsoft	LOG Corporation	1989-08-09
Dragon City X Shitei	X Shitei Brand	FairyTale	1991-04-13
Dragon Eyes: The Space Opera	Technopolis Soft	FairyTale	1991-05
Dragon Knight	ELF Corporation	ELF Corporation	1990-10-31
Dragon Knight 4	ELF Corporation	ELF Corporation	1994-03-31
Dragon Knight II	ELF Corporation	ELF Corporation	1991-02-28
Dragon Knight III	ELF Corporation	ELF Corporation	1992-01-31
Dragon Slayer: The Legend of Heroes	SPS	SPS	1993-01-08
Dragon Spirit	Dempa, Namco	Dempa	1988-09-23
Dragon Wars	StarCraft, Inc.	Interplay Productions	1991-05-31
Drakkhen	BANDIT Inc.	Epic/Sony Records	1991-09-06
Dungeon Master	Victor Musical Industries	Victor Musical Industries	1990-01-26
Dynamite Duke	Hertz	Hertz	1990-11-30
Eight Lakes G.C.	T&E Soft	T&E Soft	1991-07-05
Eikan wa Kimi ni: Kōkō Yakyū Zenkoku Taikai	Artdink	Artdink	1990-12-07
ELLE	ELF Corporation	ELF Corporation	1991-07-17
Emerald Densetsu	System House Oh!	System House Oh!	1990-07-30
Emerald Dragon	Glodia	Glodia	1990-12-06
Endan Genpei Sōranki: Irohanihoheto	Studio Angel	Zenryūtsū	1988-02
Endan Rekishi Emaki: Nukata no Ōkimi	Studio Angel	Zenryūtsū	1989-12-21
Endan Tokugawa Kouryūki Gorakuin	Studio Angel	Zenryūtsū	1988-12-21
Entfuhrer: Yōsei Yūka Jikken	Studio Angel	Zenryūtsū	1989-04
Étoile Princesse	Exact	Exact	1993-03-26
Europa Sensen	Koei	Koei	1992-07-11
Evil Stone	Studio Angel	Zenryūtsū	1989-08
eXOn	Nihon Softec	Nihon Softec	1991-09-20
Exterlien	D.O. Corp.	D.O. Corp.	1990-12-07
F-15 Strike Eagle II	MPS Labs	MicroProse	1991-09-28
Fantasy Saga System: Tigunasu no Bōken	M.N.M Software	Brother Kōgyō	1990-09-18
Fantasy Zone	Dempa	Dempa	1989-08-04
Far Side Moon: Chikyū Bōeigun II	Artdink	Artdink	1990-04-13
Final Fight	Capcom	Capcom	1992-07-17
First Queen	Kure Software Koubou	Kure Software Koubou	1989-12-23
First Queen II	Kure Software Koubou	Kure Software Koubou	1992-02-01
Flappy 2: The resurrection of Blue Star	dB-SOFT	dB-SOFT	1989-11-30
Flying Shark	Kaneko	Kaneko	1991-11-22
Foxy 2	ELF Corporation	ELF Corporation	1991-04-25
Fruits Field	F.F.C.	Compac Inc.	1989-03
Full Throttle	SPS	Sharp Corporation	1988-12
Fushigi no Umi no Nadia	Gainax	Gainax	1992-10-23
Future Wars: Toki no Bōkensha	Voice and Image Products	StarCraft, Inc.	1991-08-09
FZ Senki Axis	Wolf Team	Wolf Team	1990-10-10
G.R.: Gravity Response	Team Vcut	Tenshindō	1993-02-01
Gakuen Bomber	Active Software	Active Software	1994-05-27
Galaga '88	Dempa, Namco	Dempa	1990-06-30
Game Jang	G.A.M. Corporation	G.A.M. Corporation	1993-07-15
Gamma Planet	Compac Inc.	Compac Inc.	1989-12-15
Garō Densetsu 2: Aratanaru Tatakai	System Prisma	Magical Company	1993-12-23
Garō Densetsu Special	System Prisma	Magical Company	1994-07-28
Garō Densetsu: Shukumei no Tatakai	Magical Company	Magical Company	1993-07-23
Gaudi: Barcelona no Kaze	Wolf Team	Wolf Team	1989-08-10
Gemini Wing	System Sacom	System Sacom	1990-10-31
Genjūki: Undead Line	T&E Soft	T&E Soft	1990-09-27
Genocide	ZOOM Inc.	ZOOM Inc.	1989-07-23
Genocide 2: Master of the Dark Communion	ZOOM Inc.	ZOOM Inc.	1991-12-07
Genpei Tōma Den	Dempa	Dempa	1988-04
Geograph Seal	Exact	Exact	1994-03-12
Ginga Eiyū Densetsu	MiCROViSiON	Bothtec	1990-01-26
Ginga Eiyū Densetsu II	MiCROViSiON	Bothtec	1990-11-30
Ginga Eiyū Densetsu III	MiCROViSiON	Bothtec	1993-06-20
Girls Paradise: Rakuen no Tenshi Tachi	Great Co., Ltd.	Great Co., Ltd.	1989-11-11
Goku: Jōseki Shū	LOG Corporation	LOG Corporation	1992-11-07
Gradius	SPS	Sharp Corporation	1987-03-28
Gradius II: Gofer no Yabō	Konami	Konami	1992-02-07
Gram Cats 2	Dot Plan	Dot Plan	1993-01-14
Granada	Wolf Team	Wolf Team	1990-04-20
Grandi Florum: Mischief of Iveris	Compac Inc.	Compac Inc.	1990-03
Ground Master: Ushinawareta Takara Shu no Densetsu	Zainsoft	Xain Soft	1988-04-15
Group X	Compac Inc.	Compac Inc.	1991-07
Guerrière Lyeward	Tokuma Shoten	Technopolis Soft	1990-01-30
Gunship	MicroProse	MicroProse	1990-08-23
Hana Yori Dango	Active Software	Active Software	1991-11-11
Hana Yori Dango 2	Active Software	Active Software	1993-02-27
Hanafuda Hōrōki	Dot Plan	Dot Plan	1988-08
Hanafuda Tengoku	Junk System	Junk System	1990-06-26
Harenochi: Ōsawagi!	Cocktail Soft	Cocktail Soft	1990-11-21
Harukanaru Augusta	T&E Soft	T&E Soft	1991-04-05
Hatchake Ayayo-san 2: Ikenai Holiday	HARD	HARD	1991-09-06
Hatchake Ayayo-san 3: Utashi, Icchatan Desu	HARD	HARD	1992-12-21
Hatchake Ayayo-san Pro68K	HARD	HARD	1990-04-26
Heavy Nova	Holocronet	Brother Kōgyō	1992-04-10
Himitsu no Hanazono	Technopolis Soft	Technopolis Soft	1992-03
History of Elthlead	NCS Corporation	Masaya	1989-03-30
Hōma Hunter Lime Dai-1-Wa	Silence	Brother Kōgyō	1993-08-06
Hōma Hunter Lime Dai-2-Wa	Silence	Brother Kōgyō	1993-09-10
Hōma Hunter Lime Dai-3-Wa	Silence	Brother Kōgyō	1993-10-09
Hōma Hunter Lime Dai-4-Wa	Silence	Brother Kōgyō	1993-11-10
Hōma Hunter Lime Dai-5-Wa	Silence	Brother Kōgyō	1993-12-10
Hōma Hunter Lime Dai-6-Wa	Silence	Brother Kōgyō	1994-01-10
Hōma Hunter Lime Dai-7-Wa	Silence	Brother Kōgyō	1994-02-12
Hōma Hunter Lime Dai-8-Wa	Silence	Brother Kōgyō	1994-03-10
Hōma Hunter Lime Dai-9-Wa	Silence	Brother Kōgyō	1994-04-09
Hōma Hunter Lime Dai-10-Wa	Silence	Brother Kōgyō	1994-05-10
Hōma Hunter Lime Dai-11-Wa	Silence	Brother Kōgyō	1994-06-10
Hōma Hunter Lime Dai-12-Wa	Silence	Brother Kōgyō	1994-07-21
Hoshi no Suna Monogatari	D.O. Corp.	D.O. Corp.	1991-03-05
Hoshi no Suna Monogatari 2	D.O. Corp.	D.O. Corp.	1992-06-26
Hotel Wars	Bothtec	Bothtec	1989-03-17
How Many Robot	Artdink	Artdink	1988-02-27
Hydlide 3: The Space Memories - Special Version	Thinking Rabbit	Brother Kōgyō	1990-11-05
If	Active Software	Active Software	1993-04-29
If 2	Active Software	Active Software	1993-10-16
If 3	Active Software	Active Software	1995-03-03
Illumina!	Cocktail Soft	FairyTale	1991-04-26
Illusion City	Microcabin	Brother Kōgyō	1993-05
Image	Software House Parsley	Software House Parsley	1992-07-10
Image 2	Software House Parsley	Software House Parsley	1993-04-27
Image Fight	Irem	Irem	1990-12-14
Imitation wa Ai Senai	Great Co., Ltd.	Great Co., Ltd.	1990-03
Imperial Force	SystemSoft	SystemSoft	1991-09-06
Inindo: Datō Nobunaga	Koei	Koei	1991-12-21
Ishidō: The Way of Stones	Publishing International	ASCII Corporation	1991-03-20
Ishin no Arashi	Koei	Koei	1990-04-14
Jack Nicklaus' Greatest 18 Holes of Major Championship Golf	Sculptured Software	Cross Media Soft	1989-08-20
Jan Jaka Jan (Note: An alternate edition exist named Jan Jaka Jan: Onnanoko ga Ippai Ban with reduced nudity.)	ELF Corporation	ELF Corporation	1992-12-24
Jane	ZigZag	System House Oh!	1991-02-14
Jangō 1	Micronics, Orpheck Inc.	Cross Media Soft	1989-03
Jangō 2	Orpheck Inc.	Cross Media Soft	1990-08-24
Janshin Quest	SPS	SPS	1994-05
Jesus II	Enix	Enix	1991-07-28
Jissen Billiards	Pack-In-Video	Pack-In-Video	1990-06-21
Jissen Igo Taikyoku: Gokichi-Kun Shokyū Jō	G.A.M. Corporation	G.A.M. Corporation	1988-04-10
Joker II	Birdy Soft	Birdy Soft	1992-03-20
Joshi Kōsei Idol: Osanadzuma Funsenki	Studio Angel	Zenryūtsū	1988-04
Joshua	Panther Software	Panther Software	1992-04-25
Kaerimichi wa Kiken ga Ippai	D.O. Corp.	D.O. Corp.	1990-10-19
Kage no Subashi Shitehonzon	KD Office	KD Office	1989-01
Kareinaru Jinsei: Mina-San no Okage Desu.	FairyTale	FairyTale	1992-03-18
Kawarazaki ke no Ichizoku	Silky's	Silky's	1993-12-22
Keeper	Success	ASCII Corporation	1993-12-25
Kera Kera Boshi	Cocktail Soft	Ides	1992-11-06
Kibun wa Pastel Tacchi! Abu nai Gakuen Hen	Great Co., Ltd.	Artist Soft	1990-03-02
Kikō Shidan	Artdink	Artdink	1990-12
Kikou Soushin Valkaiser	Silence	Brother Kougyou	1993-01-20
Kimi Dake ni Ai o...	Technopolis Soft	Technopolis Soft	1991-10-10
Kindan no Paradise	Studio Angel	Zenryūtsū	1989-09
King's Dungeon	Soft Plan	Soft Plan	1992-12-04
Kiss of Murder: Satsui no Seppun	Riverhillsoft	Riverhillsoft	1988-02-11
Kitahei 68K	SPS	SPS	1992-05-01
Kiwame	LOG Corporation	LOG Corporation	1993-03
Klax	Hudson Soft	Hudson Soft	1990-12-14
Knight Arms: The Hyblid Framer	Arsys Software	Arsys Software	1989-12-08
Kōbe Renai Monogatari	Zainsoft	Zainsoft	1990-01-11
Kohakuiro no Yuigon: Seiyō Karuta Renzoku Satsujin Jiken	Riverhillsoft	Riverhillsoft	1988-09-09
Kokuren Uchū Gun Shikan Gakkō: Saotome Gakuen Nyūgaku Annai	Studio Angel	Zenryūtsū	1989-03
Konyamo Asama de Powerful Mahjong 2	dB-SOFT	dB-SOFT	1989-02
Koroshi no Dress 3	FairyTale	Ides	1993-02-10
Kōryūki	Koei	Koei	1993-11-05
Ku2	Panther Software	Panther Software	1993-04-09
Ku2 Front Row	Panther Software	Panther Software	1992-12-10
Kudokikata Oshiemasu	HARD	HARD	1988-12
Kudokikata Oshiemasu Part II: Kind Gals	HARD	HARD	1988-12
Kurutta Kajitsu	FairyTale	Ides	1992-05-01
Kyūkyoku Tiger	Inter State	Kaneko	1993-01-15
L'Empereur	Koei	Koei	1991-02-19
Lagoon	ZOOM Inc.	ZOOM Inc.	1990-09-12
Lam-Mal	FairyTale	Ides	1992-09-04
Laplace no Ma	Group SNE	HummingBirdSoft	1990-12-21
Last Armageddon	Brain Grey	Brain Grey	1989-03-01
Last Battalion	Sting Entertainment	Sting Entertainment	1991-11-15
Leading Company	Koei	Koei	1992-07-30
Lemmings	BANDIT Inc.	Imagineer	1992-04-17
Lenam: Sword of Legend	Hertz	Hertz	1989-12-21
Libido 7	Libido	Libido	1994-08-24
Life & Death	Ving Co., Ltd.	Brother Kōgyō	1992-04-25
Lifraim	M.N.M Software	Brother Kōgyō	1990-04-18
Lightning Bacchus: The Knight of Iron	NCS Corporation	Masaya	1989-03-30
Lipstick Adventure	FairyTale	FairyTale	1989-11-29
Lipstick Adventure 2	FairyTale	Brother Kōgyō	1990-10-18
Lipstick Adventure 3	FairyTale	Ides	1993-06
Loop Eraser	Nihon Computer Club Renmei Kikaku	Nihon Computer Club Renmei Kikaku	1991-08-10
Loopz	Cygnus Inc.	Broderbund Japan	1991-06-21
Lovely Horror: Ochame na Yūrei	Studio Angel	Zenryūtsū	1988-07-21
Lua	Inter Heart	Inter Heart	1993-11-26
Lucy Shot	Nihon Softec	Nihon Softec	1990-11-16
Mad Stalker: Full Metal Forth	Fill-in-Cafe	Family Soft	1994-01-14
Magic Knight	NIC	Dot Plan	1993-03-26
Magical Shot	M.N.M Software	M.N.M Software	1991-03-08
Mahjong Clinic Zōkangō	Home Data	Home Data	1991-06-15
Mahjong Gensōkyoku	Active Software	Active Software	1992-06-26
Mahjong Gensōkyoku II	Active Software	Active Software	1993-08-28
Mahjong Gokū	Chat Noir	ASCII Corporation	1988-08
Mahjong Kōkaigi	Alex	Brother Kōgyō	1994-06-20
Mahjong Kyō Jidai Special	Micronet co., Ltd.	Micronet co., Ltd.	1988-04
Mahjong Master	Alex	Brother Kōgyō	1991-09-28
Mahjong Saikyō Musashi	Cosmos Computer	Cosmos Computer	1989-06-22
Mahjong Yūenchi	Home Data	Home Data	1991-12-20
Mahō Daisakusen	Raizing	Electronic Arts Victor	1994-12-16
Mai	FairyTale	FairyTale	1992-03-27
Maison Ikkoku: Kanketsuhen Special	Microcabin	Microcabin	1988-12-16
Majinkyū	Xain Soft	Xain Soft	1987-11
Makenshi Kumiko	ZigZag	New System House Oh!	1989-01-20
Manhattan Requiem	Riverhillsoft	Riverhillsoft	1987-12
Marble Madness	Home Data	Home Data	1991-03-15
Märchen Maze	SPS	SPS	1991-03-15
Marchen Paradise	Great Co., Ltd.	Great Co., Ltd.	1990-10-21
Marine Buster	Silky's	Silky's	1993-03-18
Martial Age	Tenshindō	Tenshindō	1993-03-26
Master of Monsters II	SystemSoft	SystemSoft	1992-02-21
Mayumi	Cocktail Soft	Cocktail Soft	1992-10-16
Mega-Lo-Mania	Sensible Software	Imagineer	1993-03-19
Meikantoku II	JDS	JDS	1988-07-15
Mercury: The Prime Master	Maxima	Maxima	1991-04-27
Metal Eye	ELF Corporation	ELF Corporation	1993-05-28
Metal Sight	Team Cross Wonder	System Sacom	1989-12-08
Mid-Garts Gold	Wolf Team	Wolf Team	1989-08-18
Might and Magic Book One: The Secret of the Inner Sanctum	New World Computing	StarCraft, Inc.	1988-10-15
Might and Magic Book Two: Gates to Another World!	New World Computing	StarCraft, Inc.	1989-03-17
Miki	FairyTale	FairyTale; Brother Kōgyō (TAKERU distribution)	1993-04-15
Milk Time	ZigZag	System House Oh!	1991-05
Mirage	Discovery Software	Discovery Software	1992-03
Misty Vol. 1	Data West	Data West	1989-10-25
Misty Vol. 2	Data West	Data West	1989-11-24
Misty Vol. 3	Data West	Data West	1990-01-25
Misty Vol. 4	Data West	Data West	1990-07-25
Misty Vol. 5	Data West	Data West	1990-09-21
Misty Vol. 6	Data West	Data West	1990-11-22
Misty Vol. 7	Data West	Data West	1991-01-25
Mobile Suit Gundam: Classic Operation	Family Soft	Brother Kōgyō	1991-09-27
Momotarō Densetsu: Peach Boy Legend	Hudson Soft	Hudson Soft	1988-02-26
Moon Crystal	Orange House	Orange House	1992-05-15
Moonlight-Chan Rin-Shan	D.O. Corp.	D.O. Corp.	1993-03-19
Morita Shōgi II	Random House	Enix	1989-05-26
Motos	Dempa	Dempa	1989-11-24
Mugen Senshi Valis II	Renovation Game	Nihon Telenet	1989-11-23
Murder Club DX: Satsujin Club DX	Riverhillsoft	Riverhillsoft	1988-12-09
My Eyes!	Birdy Soft	Birdy Soft	1992-09-10
Naious	Exact	Exact	1990-10-26
Namachūkei 68	Konami	Konami	1991-07-30
Nectaris	Hudson Soft	SystemSoft	1992-09-25
Neji Shiki	Will Co., Ltd.	Zeit Corporation	1989-09-07
Nekketsu Kōkō Dodgeball Bu	SPS	Sharp Corporation	1988-08
Nekketsu Kōkō Dodgeball-bu: Soccer-hen	SPS	Sharp Corporation	1990-10
Nemesis '90 Kai	SPS	SPS	1993-11-12
Neural Gear	Fill-in-Cafe	Cross Media Soft	1990-11-23
Nicoll	ZigZag	System House Oh!	1990-11
Niko^{2}	Wolf Team	Wolf Team	1991-11-18
Noah	M.N.M Software	M.N.M Software	1992-05-08
Noble Mind	Alfa System	Brother Kōgyō	1991-11-09
Nobunaga no Yabō: Bushō Fūunroku	Koei	Koei	1991-08
Nobunaga no Yabō: Haōden	Koei	Koei	1993-04-02
Nobunaga no Yabō: Sengoku Gun'yūden	Koei	Koei	1989-12-08
Nobunaga no Yabō: Zenkokuban	Koei	Koei	1988-11
Nostalgia 1907	Sur Dé Wave	Brother Kōgyō	1991-04-02
Ōedo Hanjōki	Studio Panther	Studio Panther	1989-06-03
Ōgon no Rashinban: Shōyōmaru San Francisco Kōro Satsujin Jiken	Riverhillsoft	Riverhillsoft	1991-06-14
Oh! Pai	Silky's	Silky's	1993-09-22
Okuman Chōja	Cosmos Computer	Cosmos Computer	1988-06
Olteus II	WinkySoft	Brother Kōgyō	1991-08-23
Orange Iro no Biyaku Part II	System House Oh!	System House Oh!	1989-09-29
Overtake	ZOOM Inc.	ZOOM Inc.	1992-11-13
Pac-Mania	SPS	Sharp Corporation	1989-03-18
Pachinko World	I.S.C. Co., Ltd.	Brother Kōgyō	1992-12-04
Parodiusu Da! Shinwa kara Owarai e	Konami	Konami	1991-04-19
Phalanx	ZOOM Inc.	ZOOM Inc.	1991-05-17
Phantasie III: The Wrath of Nikademus	Winston Douglas Wood	StarCraft, Inc.	1989-08
Phantasie IV: The Birth of Heroes	Winston Douglas Wood	StarCraft, Inc.	1991-03-28
Pias	Birdy Soft	Birdy Soft	1990-10-24
Pinball Pinball	Nihon Softec	Nihon Softec	1990-08-10
Pinky 1	ZigZag	System House Oh!	1990-12-21
Pinky Ponky Dai-1-Shū: Beautiful Dream	ELF Corporation	ELF Corporation	1990-08-30
Pinky Ponky Dai-2-Shū: Twilight Games	ELF Corporation	ELF Corporation	1990-08-30
Pinky Ponky Dai-3-Shū: Battle Lovers	ELF Corporation	ELF Corporation	1990-08-30
Pipe Dream	Bullet-Proof Software	Bullet-Proof Software	1992-11-13
Pipyan	M.N.M Software	Brother Kōgyō	1990-09-05
PitaPat	Fill-in-Cafe	Cross Media Soft	1992-01-24
Planetary Campaign 68K	Nihon Computer Club Renmei Kikaku	Nihon Computer Club Renmei Kikaku	1992-05-16
Ponyon	Ponytail Soft	Ponytail Soft	1992-01-24
Populous	Infinity Co., Ltd.	Imagineer	1990-03-23
Populous II: Trials of the Olympian Gods	Infinity Co., Ltd.	Imagineer	1992-08-28
Power League	Hudson Soft	Hudson Soft	1988-12
Power Monger	Infinity Co., Ltd.	Imagineer	1991-10-25
Premium	Silky's	Silky's	1992-09-17
Premium 2	Silky's	Silky's	1993-01-28
Present	Orange House	Orange House	1991-10-17
Present 2	Orange House	Orange House	1992-11-05
Pretty Doll	ZigZag	System House Oh!	1991-04
Prince of Persia	Riverhillsoft	Broderbund Japan	1991-04-30
Princess Maker	New Corporation	New Corporation	1997-01-31
Princess wa Street Girl?	Lucifer Soft	Zenryūtsū	1989-12-21
Pro Soccer 68	SPS	Imagineer	1991-11-29
Pro Student G	Alice Soft	Alice Soft	1993-06-15
Pro Tennis: World Court	SPS	SPS	1990-07-20
Production Manager	Compac Inc.	Compac Inc.	1989-01
Puyo Puyo	Compile	SPS	1994-03-25
Puzznic	M.N.M Software	Broderbund Japan	1990-05-31
Quarterstaff: The Tomb of Setmoth	Simulated Environment Systems	StarCraft, Inc.	1991-02
Quarth	Konami	Konami	1990-07-06
Quintia Road	Great Co., Ltd.	Great Co., Ltd.	1991-07-19
Quiz Banchō: 3-Ta Kun 2	Active Software	Active Software	1992-02-08
Quiz Ikasete...	Soft House Aladdin	Soft House Aladdin	1991-06
Quiz Torimonochō	Dempa	Dempa	1992-03-25
R-Type	Irem	Irem	1989-06-09
Rance II: Hangyaku no Shōjotachi	Alice Soft	Alice Soft	1990-07-13
Rance III: Leazas Kanraku	Alice Soft	Alice Soft	1991-10-15
Rance: Hikari o Motomete	Alice Soft	Alice Soft	1989-11-15
Ray-Gun	ELF Corporation	ELF Corporation	1990-12-12
Record of Lodoss War II: Goshiki no Maryū	HummingBirdSoft	HummingBirdSoft	1992-11-20
Record of Lodoss War: Fukujinzuke	HummingBirdSoft	Brother Kōgyō	1991-12-21
Record of Lodoss War: Haīro No Majio	HummingBirdSoft	HummingBirdSoft	1991-08-24
Reichsritter	Random House	Enix	1991-05-26
Reinforcer	Zainsoft	Zainsoft	1990-12
Relics	Bothtec	Bothtec	1987-09
Review: Jashin Fukkatsu	Orange House	Orange House	1991-05
Ring Master I: The Shadow of Filias	Hobby Japan	Hobby Japan	1989-08-25
Ring Master II: Forget You Not, Evermore	Hobby Japan	Hobby Japan	1990-12-14
Rising Sun	Cinemaware	Victor Musical Industries	1992-08-28
Robot Construction R.C.	Electric Sheep	Electric Sheep	1993-07-30
Robot Construction R.C.: Robot-Shū + Alpha 1	Electric Sheep	Brother Kōgyō	1993-12-11
Robot Construction R.C.: Robot-Shū + Alpha 2	Electric Sheep	Brother Kōgyō	1994-04-08
Robot Construction R.C.: Robot-Shū + Alpha 3	Electric Sheep	Brother Kōgyō	1994-08-11
Robot Construction R.C.: Robot-Shū + Alpha 4	Electric Sheep	Brother Kōgyō	1994-12-09
Robot Construction R.C.: Robot-Shū + Alpha 5	Electric Sheep	Brother Kōgyō	1995-04-14
Robot Construction R.C.: Robot-Shū + Alpha 6	Electric Sheep	Brother Kōgyō	1995-08
Robot Construction R.C.: Robot-Shū + Alpha 7	Electric Sheep	Brother Kōgyō	1995-12
Robot Construction R.C.: Robot-Shū + Alpha 8	Electric Sheep	Brother Kōgyō	1996-01
Robot Construction R.C.: Robot-Shū + Alpha 9	Electric Sheep	Brother Kōgyō	1996-01
Rogue Alliance	StarCraft, Inc.	StarCraft, Inc.	1989-07-21
Rouge: Manatsu no Kuchibeni	Birdy Soft	Birdy Soft	1990-09-20
Royal Blood	Koei	Koei	1992-03-27
Rune Worth: Kokui no Kikōshi	T&E Soft	T&E Soft	1990-07-13
Ryukyu	Login Soft	ASCII Corporation	1989-08-08
Ryū: Naki no Ryū Yori	Wolf Team	Wolf Team	1991-02-15
Sabnack	Kogado Studio	Kogado Studio	1991-04-26
Sailor Fuku Ikena - Itaiken Kokuhaku-shū Vol. 1: Lost Virgin	Lucifer Soft	Zenryūtsū	1988-05-21
Sailor Fuku Ikena - Itaiken Kokuhaku-shū Vol. 2: Temptation	Lucifer Soft	Zenryūtsū	1988-05-21
Sailor Fuku Ikena - Itaiken Kokuhaku-shū Vol. 3: Ecstasy	Lucifer Soft	Zenryūtsū	1988-05-21
Sakura no Mori	Active Software	Active Software	1995-10-27
Salamander	SPS	Sharp Corporation	1988-10
Sangokushi	Koei	Koei	1988-12-09
Sangokushi II	Koei	Koei	1990-08-10
Sangokushi III	Koei	Koei	1992-07-17
Saori: The House of Beautiful Girls	X Shitei Brand	FairyTale	1991-12-23
Saotome Gakuen Blue Wind Story 1	Studio Angel	Zenryūtsū	1989-12-21
SAP Tokushu Koudou Keisatsu 2nd File: Kids	Great Co., Ltd.	Great Co., Ltd.	1992-06
SAP Tokushu Kōdō Keisatsu File: M661-51	Great Co., Ltd.	Great Co., Ltd.	1991-02-22
Schwarzschild II: Teikoku no Haishin	Kogado Studio	Xing Entertainment	1991-10-10
Schwarzschild: Kyōran no Ginga	Kogado Studio	Kogado Studio	1990-12-07
Scorpius	B-Type	Shinseisha	1991-05-10
Sekai de Ichiban Kimi ga Suki!	Cocktail Soft	FairyTale	1990-12-18
Setsujū: Yuganda Kioku	JAST	JAST	1995-04-05
Shanghai	SystemSoft	SystemSoft	1987-12-20
Shanghai II	Alfa System	Hudson Soft	1989-12-08
Shanghai: Banri no Chōjō	Activision, Success	Electronic Arts Victor	1994-11-26
Shangrlia	ELF Corporation	ELF Corporation	1991-09-26
Shangrlia 2	ELF Corporation	ELF Corporation	1993-10-28
Shangrlia 2: Special Disk	ELF Corporation	ELF Corporation	1993-10-28
Shikinjō	Scap Trust	Scap Trust	1990-07-14
Shin Tenshi-Tachi no Gogo: Tenkōsei	JAST	JAST	1995-07-18
Shinjuku Monogatari	FairyTale	Ides	1992-08-21
Shōgi Seiten	Home Data	Home Data	1992-05
Shōjo Densetsu Part II	System House Oh!	System House Oh!	1989-09-29
Shoot Range	Bit^{2}, Co-Deuz Computer	Bit^{2}	1992-07-31
Shooting 68K	Amorphous	Brother Kōgyō	1991-05-10
Shooting 68K: Games Grand Prix	Amorphous	Brother Kōgyō	1992-08-20
Shooting 68K: Games Yushū Shō-2-Saku	Amorphous	Brother Kōgyō	1992-08-20
Shufflepuck Café	M.N.M Software	Broderbund Japan	1989-11-13
Signatory: Chōinsha	Tenky Co., Ltd.	NCS Corporation	1991-03-29
Silent Möbius: Case - Titanic	Gainax	Gainax	1991-06-07
SimAnt	Maxis	Imagineer	1993-02-26
SimCity	Foretune Co., Ltd.	Imagineer	1990-09-07
SimEarth: The Living Planet	Maxis	Imagineer	1992-05-29
Slimyer	M.N.M Software	Hot-B	1990-04-21
Soft de Hard na Monogatari	System Sacom	System Sacom	1988-07-30
Soft de Hard na Monogatari 2	System Sacom	System Sacom	1989-06-16
Sokoban Perfect	Thinking Rabbit	Thinking Rabbit	1989-11-20
Sokoban Revenge SX-68K: User no Gyakushū-Hen	Thinking Rabbit	Sharp Corporation	1993-05
Sol-Feace	Wolf Team	Wolf Team	1990-11-22
Sonic Linker	Maybe Soft	Maybe Soft	1993-12-07
Sora no Fudousan	Jitensha Sougyou	Jitensha Sougyou	2004-04-28
Sorakakeru Businessman	Studio Angel	Zenryūtsū	1990-09-01
Sotsugyō Shashin	FairyTale	FairyTale; Brother Kōgyō (TAKERU distribution)	1993-04-15
Sotsugyō: Graduation	Headroom, Japan Home Video	Brother Kōgyō	1994-01-20
Space Harrier	Dempa	Dempa	1987-09
Space Rogue	Tsuji Jimusho	Wave Train	1990-12-18
Spindizzy II	Arsys Software	Arsys Software	1992-04-10
Square Resort: Hyper Senshasen	Yamaco	Family Soft	1992-11-27
Star Cruiser	Arsys Software	Arsys Software	1989-04-14
Star Luster	Dempa	Dempa	1994-08-26
Star Mobile	M.N.M Software	M.N.M Software	1991-06-20
Star Trader	M.N.M Software	Brother Kōgyō	1992-02-20
Star Wars: Attack on the Death Star	M.N.M Software	Victor Musical Industries	1991-12-13
Starship Rendezvous	ARKLIGHT	Scap Trust	1989-06-26
Strawberry Daisenryaku Novu	FairyTale	FairyTale	1990-10
Street Fighter II′	Capcom	Capcom	1993-11-26
Strider Hiryū	Capcom	Capcom	1992-11-27
Strike Range	Gimmick House	Brother Kōgyō	1992-12-11
Suikoden: Tenmei no Chikai	Koei	Koei	1989-12-19
Super D.P.S	Alice Soft	Alice Soft	1992-09
Super Daisenryaku 68K	SystemSoft	SystemSoft	1989-02
Super Hang-On	SPS	Sharp Corporation	1989-12-25
Super Real Mahjong PII & PIII	Ving Co., Ltd.	Ving Co., Ltd.	1993-10-24
Super Real Mahjong PIV	Ving Co., Ltd.	Ving Co., Ltd.	1994-04-27
Super Shanghai: Dragon's Eye	Aisystem Tokyo, Hot-B, Soft Machine	Brother Kōgyō	1992-02-29
Super Street Fighter II: The New Challengers	Capcom	Capcom	1994-09-30
Super Ultra Mucchin Puripuri Cyborg: Marilyn DX	JAST	JAST	1994-06
Super Xevious	Dempa	Dempa	1987-06
Sweet Angel	Active Software	Active Software	1992-11-07
Sweet Emotion	Discovery Software	Discovery Software	1991-07-19
Syvalion	SPS	Sharp Corporation	1990-09-14
T.D.F. Kaijū Daisensō Kesshi no Genshiro Bōei Sakusen	Data West	Data West	1987-11
Taiheiyō no Arashi DX	G.A.M. Corporation	G.A.M. Corporation	1988-12-24
Taikō Risshiden	Koei	Koei	1992-03-13
Tanba	Micronet co., Ltd.	Micronet co., Ltd.	1988-11
Teitoku no Ketsudan	Koei	Koei	1990-07-20
Tenka Tōitsu	Arsys Software	SystemSoft	1990-05-18
Tenkyuhai	Studio Panther	Studio Panther	1989-09-07
Tenkyuhai Special: Tōgen no Utage	Studio Panther	Brother Kōgyō	1990-02-23
Tenkyuhai Special: Tōgen no Utage Part 2 - Joshikōsei Hen	Studio Panther	Brother Kōgyō	1990-04-24
Tenshi-Tachi no Gogo Collection	JAST	JAST	1995-03-24
Tenshi-Tachi no Gogo III: Ribbon	JAST	JAST	1989-12-25
Tenshi-Tachi no Gogo III: Bangai-Hen	JAST	JAST	1990-11-20
Tenshi-Tachi no Gogo IV: Yūko	JAST	JAST	1991-09-24
Tenshi-Tachi no Gogo VI: My Fair Teacher	JAST	JAST	1993-11
Tenshin Ranma	ELF Corporation	ELF Corporation	1992-04-18
Tesera: Kimi wa, Yogoreta Tenshi ka Seinaru Majokka!?	Technopolis Soft	Technopolis Soft	1992-09-25
Tetris	Bullet-Proof Software	Bullet-Proof Software	1988-11-18
Thanatos	Birdy Soft	Birdy Soft	1991-04-09
The 4th Unit	Data West	Data West	1988-12-05
The 4th Unit 2	Data West	Data West	1988-12-15
The 4th Unit Act.3: Dual Targets	Data West	Data West	1989-07-15
The 4th Unit Act.4: Zerø:	Data West	Data West	1990-04-03
The 4th Unit Five: D-Again	Data West	Data West	1990-07-20
The Cockpit	Compac Inc.	Compac Inc.	1988-02
The Fairyland Story	OeRSTED Inc.	SPS	1991-09-27
The Joker	Birdy Soft	Birdy Soft	1991-12-06
The King of Chicago	Master Designer Software	Bothtec, Cinemaware	1988-12-16
The Las Vegas	Nihon Dexter	Nihon Dexter	1988-04
The Man I Love	Thinking Rabbit	Thinking Rabbit	1989-02-11
The NewZealand Story	SPS	Sharp Corporation	1989-07-15
The Queen of Duellist Gaiden Alpha+	Agumix	Xing Entertainment	1994-07-29
The Queen of Duellist Gaiden Alpha+ Light	Agumix	Xing Entertainment	1994-11-08
The Return of Ishtar	SPS	SPS	1988-08-10
The Super Las Vegas	Nihon Dexter	Nihon Dexter	1988-11-25
The Super Las Vegas II	Nihon Dexter	Nihon Dexter	1990-11-24
Thrice	M.N.M Software	M.N.M Software	1991-02-09
Thunder Blade	SPS	Sharp Corporation	1990-02-03
Thunder Force II	Tecno Soft	Tecno Soft	1988-10-15
Thunder Rescue	Gimmick House	Brother Kōgyō	1992-10-20
Tokimeki Cherry Box	D.O. Corp.	D.O. Corp.	1990-05-16
Tōshin Toshi	Alice Soft	Alice Soft	1991-06-15
Totsugeki! Bakkon Street	JAST	JAST	1993-12
Totsugeki! Bakkon Street II: Hunting Roulette	JAST	JAST	1994-09-25
Trilogy Kuki Ayakashiden	Gundeck	Gundeck	1991-03
Tritorn Final	Lee Way Corporation	Xain Soft	1989-07-23
Tsūkai Gag Adventure: Narutomaki Hichō	Lucifer Soft	Zenryūtsū	1990-04-10
Tunnels & Trolls: Crusaders of Khazan	New World Computing	StarCraft, Inc.	1990-06-16
Twilight	Studio Twinkle	Studio Twinkle	1995-04-14
Twilight Zone III: Nagakute Amai Yoru	Great Co., Ltd.	Great Co., Ltd.	1989-11-10
Twilight Zone IV: Tokubetsuhen	Great Co., Ltd.	Great Co., Ltd.	1990-07
TwinBee	SPS	Sharp Corporation	1988-02
Uchū Kaitō Funny Bee	Alice Soft	Alice Soft	1994-08-10
Ultima IV: Quest of the Avatar	Newtopia Planning	Pony Canyon	1988-12-21
Ultima V: Warriors of Destiny	Infinity Co., Ltd.	Pony Canyon	1990-07-21
Ultima VI: The False Prophet	Locus Company Ltd.	Pony Canyon	1992-06-19
Urotsukidōji	FairyTale	FairyTale	1990-07-27
V'Ball	SPS	Sharp Corporation	1989-11-15
Vampire High School	Inter Heart	Dot Plan	1994-07-08
Vessel	M.N.M Software	Brother Kōgyō	1990-07-25
Video Game Anthology Vol. 1: Terra Cresta/Moon Cresta	Dempa	Dempa	1992-11-20
Video Game Anthology Vol. 2: Atomic Runner Chelnov	Dempa	Dempa	1993-01-29
Video Game Anthology Vol. 3: Star Force	Dempa	Dempa	1993-03-26
Video Game Anthology Vol. 4: Libble Rabble	Dempa	Dempa	1993-06-25
Video Game Anthology Vol. 5: Crazy Climber/Crazy Climber 2	Dempa	Dempa	1993-08-27
Video Game Anthology Vol. 6: Butasan	Dempa	Dempa	1993-10-29
Video Game Anthology Vol. 7: Dragon Buster	Dempa	Dempa	1993-12-10
Video Game Anthology Vol. 8: Exciting Hour - The Prowrestling Network/Shusse Ōzumō	Dempa	Dempa	1994-02-25
Video Game Anthology Vol. 9: Arugosu no Senshi	Dempa	Dempa	1994-04-28
Video Game Anthology Vol. 10: Mr. Do!/Mr. Do! v.s Unicorns	Dempa	Dempa	1994-06
Video Game Anthology Vol. 11: Pac-Land	Dempa	Dempa	1994-12-16
Video Game Anthology Vol. 12: Dig Dug/Dig Dug II	Dempa	Dempa	1995-02-24
Video Game Anthology Vol. 13: Baraduke	Dempa	Dempa	1995-05-26
Viewpoint	Nexus Interact	Nexus Interact	1995-01-20
Viper-V6 Turbo	Sogna	Sogna	1993-12-03
Viper-V8: Twin Turbo	Sogna	Dot Plan	1994-05-13
War Torn Versnag: Versnag Senran	Family Soft	Family Soft	1993-04-28
Warning Type68	Cosmos Computer	Cosmos Computer	1988-12-12
Will no Dengon	Cocktail Soft	Ides	1992-12
Wings	Broderbund Software	Broderbund Japan	1989-10-04
Winning Post	Koei	Koei	1993-05-28
Words Worth	ELF Corporation	ELF Corporation	1993-08-27
World Golf III	Enix	Enix	1991-12-14
World Stadium	SPS	SPS	1990-12-14
Worlds of Ultima: The Savage Empire	Origin Systems	Pony Canyon	1993-08-20
Wrestle Angels	Great Co., Ltd.	Xing Entertainment	1993-09-01
Wrestle Angels 2: Top Eventer	Communication Group Plum	Xing Entertainment	1994-03-16
Wrestle Angels 3	Communication Group Plum	Xing Entertainment	1994-07-31
Wrestle Angels Special: Mō Hitori no Top Eventer	Communication Group Plum	Xing Entertainment	1994-12-15
X-na	FairyTale	FairyTale	1991-06
Xak II: Rising of the Redmoon	Microcabin	Brother Kōgyō	1992-08-29
Xak: The Art of Visual Stage	Microcabin	Microcabin	1990-04-27
Xenon 2 Megablast	System Sacom	Epic/Sony Records	1991-11-30
XIX!	FairyTale	FairyTale	1992-03
Yajiuma Pennant Race	Victor Musical Industries	Cross Media Soft	1990-01-26
Yami no Ketsuzoku	System Sacom	System Sacom	1990-07-21
Yami no Ketsuzoku: Kanketsu-hen	System Sacom	System Sacom	1990-10-05
Yaritai Hōdai	Lucifer Soft	Zenryūtsū	1988-10
Yaritai Hōdai 2: Tourist o Nerae!!	Lucifer Soft	Zenryūtsū	1989-08-10
Yaritai Hōdai 2: As You Like Vol. 1 - Europa Tour	Zenryūtsū	Zenryūtsū	1991-01
Yesterday	System House Oh!	System House Oh!	1990-10-15
Yōjū Club	D.O. Corp.	D.O. Corp.	1990-07-20
Yōjū Club 2	D.O. Corp.	D.O. Corp.	1991-08-23
Yōjū Senki: A.D. 2048	D.O. Corp.	D.O. Corp.	1994-04-22
Yoru no Tenshitachi: Shitetsu Ensen Satsujin Jiken	Crest	JAST	1990-01
Ys	Dempa	Dempa	1991-07-19
Ys III: Wanderers from Ys	Nihon Falcom	Nihon Falcom	1990-03-24
Yūjin Special Collection	Red Zone	FairyTale	1993-04-02
Yūmei Bishōjo Chara: Disk Bishōjo Ujodai Zukan	FairyTale	Santa Fe	1992-03
Yumeji: Asakusa Kitan	Cocktail Soft	Ides	1992-08
Zan: Kagerō no Toki	Wolf Team	Wolf Team	1989-12-23
Zark Legend Special	Maxima	Maxima	1990-12-14
Zavas	Glodia	Popcom Soft	1990-07-28
Zenkai Denshoku	Office Koukan	Victor Musical Industries	1991-10-25

== Doujin games ==
This section includes dōjin soft.

There are currently 8 games in this section.

Doujin and amateur X68000 games
Title	Developer(s)	Publisher(s)	Release date(s)
Comet	Pegasus Soft	Brother Kōgyō (TAKERU)	1991-04
Cuarto	ASCII	ASCII (LOGiN); Brother Kōgyō (TAKERU distribution)	1991
Gakuen Toshi Z (Note: MAME catalogues this game as doujin, but the classification has not been independently confirmed. Its paid distribution through Brother’s TAKERU service is documented.)	Striker	Brother Kōgyō (TAKERU)	1991-06-28
Lime Light	Hypa Soft	Apple Soft	1989
Ninin Battle	Takeru	ASCII (LOGiN); Brother Kōgyō (TAKERU distribution)	1990
Reserve (Note: MAME catalogues a game of this name as doujin, but its developer and date differ from the release database credits for the X68000 version. The doujin classification remains tentative.)	Silence	Brother Kōgyō (TAKERU)	1992-05
Sion II	Soft Bank	SoftBank (Oh!X)	1992
Sion IV	Soft Bank	SoftBank (Oh!X)	1995

== Expansions (data disks) ==
There are currently 52 expansions and data disks on this list.

X68000 expansions and data disks
Title	Developer(s)	Publisher(s)	Release date(s)
A-Ressha de Ikō II: Gentei Okaidoku Han	Artdink	Artdink	1990-04-13
A-Ressha de Ikō II: Shin Map	Artdink	Artdink	1988-09-10
A-Ressha de Ikō III Map Construction	Artdink	Brother Kōgyō	1991-04-26
A-Ressha de Ikō III Map Construction Shin Map Tsuki	Artdink	Brother Kōgyō	1991-05
A-Ressha de Ikō III Original Meitetsu Sharyō Disk	Login Software	ASCII Corporation	1991-06-28
Apple Club: Betsubairi Data Shū #1	FairyTale	Brother Kōgyō	1989-03
Apple Club: Betsubairi Data Shū #2	FairyTale	Brother Kōgyō	1989-03
Apple Club: Betsubairi Data Shū #3	FairyTale	Brother Kōgyō	1989-03
Apple Club: Betsubairi Data Shū #4	FairyTale	Brother Kōgyō	1989-03
Apple Club: Betsubairi Data Shū #5	FairyTale	Brother Kōgyō	1989-03
Bin Bin Mahjong: Peach Angel Data Shū	Takeru Soft	Brother Kōgyō	1990-11-13
Bretonne Lays Scenario Editor	SystemSoft	SystemSoft	1991-01-25
Bretonne Lays: Scenario Shū Vol. 1	SystemSoft	SystemSoft	1990-01-02
Bretonne Lays: Scenario Shū Vol. 2	SystemSoft	SystemSoft	1990-11-16
Bretonne Lays: Scenario Shū Vol. 3	SystemSoft	SystemSoft	1991-12-20
Daikairei: Nankai no Shitō Tsuika Scenario	Artdink	Artdink	1990-01
Daikairei: Power Kit to Shin Scenario Make Kit	Artdink	Artdink	1989-09-12
Daikairei: Tsuika Scenario	Artdink	Artdink	1990-01
Daisenryaku II: Campaign Version Sakusen Betsu Map	Sōgō Business Assist	Sōgō Business Assist	1991-04-25
Daisenryaku II: Campaign Version Unit Kaizō Pack	Sōgō Business Assist	Sōgō Business Assist	1991-06-12
Daisenryaku II: Campaign Hen Daisenryaku II Sakusen Betsu Map	Sōgō Business Assist	Sōgō Business Assist	1991-04-25
Daisenryaku II:Campaign Hen Daisenryaku II Unit Kaizou Pack	Sōgō Business Assist	Sōgō Business Assist	1992-06-12
Daisenryaku III '90 Map Collection Vol. 1	Arsys Software	SystemSoft	1990-12-13
Daisenryaku III '90 Map Collection Vol. 2	Arsys Software	SystemSoft	1991-06-28
De-Ja II: Onnanoko ga Ippai Han	ELF Corporation	ELF Corporation	1992-07-30
D.P.S SG Data 2 (Note: Mail-order-only edition containing the same scenario disks as D.P.S SG Set 2, with the system disk omitted. Requires an existing compatible system disk.)	Alice Soft	Alice Soft	1991-05-15
D.P.S SG Data 3 (Note: Mail-order-only edition containing the same scenario disks as D.P.S SG Set 3, with the system disk omitted. Requires an existing compatible system disk.)	Alice Soft	Alice Soft	1991-12-15
Double Eagle: Tricky Hole	Artdink	Artdink	1988-10-20
Dragon Knight 4: Special Disk	ELF Corporation	ELF Corporation	1994-03-31
Dragon Knight III Onnanoko ga Ippai ban	ELF Corporation	ELF Corporation	1992-01-31
Dungeon Master: Chaos Strikes Back	FTL Games	Victor Musical Industries	1990-12-21
F-15 Strike Eagle II: Sabaku no Arashi Scenario Disk	MPS Labs	MicroProse	1992-03-27
Ginga Eiyū Densetsu III Original Scenario Shū	Bothtec	Brother Kōgyō	1992-12-24
Ginga Eiyū Densetsu: Power-up and Scenario Shū	MiCROViSiON	Bothtec	1990-03-16
Jack Nicklaus Course Data Vol. 1: '89 Sandai Major Taikai Kaisai Course Hen	Sculptured Software	Cross Media Soft	1989-12-05
Jack Nicklaus Course Data Vol. 2: International Hen	Sculptured Software	Cross Media Soft	1990-06-15
Konyamo Asama de Powerful Mahjong 2 Data Shū	dB-SOFT	Brother Kōgyō	1989-04
Konyamo Asama de Powerful Mahjong 2: Data Shuu - Masako-Chan Gumi	dB-SOFT	Brother Kōgyō	1989-07-25
Mahjong Musashi: Yūmeijin Data Shū Vol. 1	Cosmos Computer	Cosmos Computer	1989-07-25
Metal Eye Special Disk	ELF Corporation	ELF Corporation	1993-05-28
Mobile Suit Gundam: Classic Operation - Original Scenario Disk	Family Soft	Family Soft	1992-03-01
Populous: The Promised Lands	Infinity Co., Ltd.	Imagineer	1990-07-06
Rance III Option Set	Alice Soft	Alice Soft	1991-10-15
Shanghai: Original Men Data	SystemSoft	SystemSoft	1987-12-20
SimCity: Terrain Editor	Foretune Co., Ltd.	Imagineer	1991-03-22
Super Daisenryaku 68K: Map Collection	SystemSoft	Science House	1989-04
Super Daisenryaku 68K Pro Kyū Map	SystemSoft	Science House	1989-04
Tenshin Ranma Onnanoko ga Ippai ban	ELF Corporation	ELF Corporation	1992-04-18
Words Worth Special Disk	ELF Corporation	ELF Corporation	1993-08-27
Yajiuma Pennant Race: 1990 Data	Victor Musical Industries	Cross Media Soft	1990-04-06
Zan: Scenario Collection Vol. 1	Wolf Team	Wolf Team	1989-12-05
Zan: Scenario Collection Vol. 2	Wolf Team	Wolf Team	1990-02-15

== Bundles ==
There are currently 6 bundles on this list.

X68000 bundles
Title	Developer(s)	Publisher(s)	Release date(s)
Daikairei: Dai Nippon Teikoku Gentei Okaidokuban	Artdink	Artdink	1990-04-13
Daikairei: Nankai no Shitō Gentei Okaidokuban	Artdink	Artdink	1990-04-13
Ginga Eiyū Densetsu +Set	Bothtec	Bothtec	1990-04-06
Ginga Eiyū Densetsu II DX+ Kit	MiCROViSiON	Bothtec	1991-08-30
Ginga Eiyū Densetsu II DX+ Set	MiCROViSiON	Bothtec	1991-09-15
Sotsugyō Shashin/Miki	Cocktail Soft	Cocktail Soft	1992-03-26

== Non-games ==
There are currently 95 non-game titles on this list.

X68000 non-game software
Title	Developer(s)	Publisher(s)	Release date(s)
All Bishōjo Extra	Arkham Products	Arkham Products	1993-11-12
Ayumi-Chan Monogatari Hint Disk	Alice Soft	Alice Soft	1994-02-15
Bishōjo CG Hyakka	Effat	Effat	1992-12
Bishōjo CG Hyakka Vol.2	Effat	Effat	1993-12
Chō Bangai Seifuku Zukan+	System House Oh!	System House Oh!	1989-06
Cocktail Soft Zōkangō	Cocktail Soft	Brother Kōgyō	1991-06-22
Cocktail Soft Zōkangō 2	Cocktail Soft	Brother Kōgyō	1993-10
Cyber Writer Ver 2.0	Nihon Computer Club Renmei Kikaku	Nihon Computer Club Renmei Kikaku	1988-11-01
Cyber Writer: Graphic & Music Library Shū	Nihon Computer Club Renmei Kikaku	Nihon Computer Club Renmei Kikaku	1988-11
Cyber Writer: Scenario Shū 1	Nihon Computer Club Renmei Kikaku	Nihon Computer Club Renmei Kikaku	1990-02-08
D.O. Doki Doki Disk Vol. 1	D.O. Corp.	D.O. Corp.	1991-02
D.O. Doki Doki Disk Vol. 2	D.O. Corp.	D.O. Corp.	1991-09
D.O. Doki Doki Disk Vol. 3	D.O. Corp.	D.O. Corp.	1992-06
D.O. Doki Doki Disk Vol. 4	D.O. Corp.	D.O. Corp.	1993-07
D.O. Doki Doki Disk Vol. 5	D.O. Corp.	D.O. Corp.	1993-07
D.O. Doki Doki Disk Vol. 6	D.O. Corp.	D.O. Corp.	1994-02
Dalk Hint Disk	Alice Soft	Alice Soft	1993-02-10
Dennou Sakka Scenario Shuu 1	Nippon Computer Club Renmei Kikaku	Nippon Computer Club Renmei Kikaku	1988-11-01
Dennou Sakka Ver 2.0	Nippon Computer Club Renmei Kikaku	Nippon Computer Club Renmei Kikaku	1988-11-01
Dennou Sakka: Graphic & Music Library Shuu	Nippon Computer Club Renmei Kikaku	Nippon Computer Club Renmei Kikaku	1988-11-01
Digital Arts Collection Vol. 1	Connect Line	Connect Line	1993-10
Digital Arts Collection Vol. 2	Connect Line	Connect Line	1993-10
Digital Arts Collection Vol. 3	Connect Line	Connect Line	1993-10
Digital Arts Collection Vol. 4	Connect Line	Connect Line	1993-10
Digital Arts Collection Vol. 5	Connect Line	Connect Line	1993-10
Digital Arts Collection Vol. 6	Connect Line	Connect Line	1993-10
Digital Arts Collection Vol. 7	Connect Line	Connect Line	1993-10
Digital Arts Collection Vol. 8	Connect Line	Connect Line	1993-10
Digital Arts Collection Vol. 9	Connect Line	Connect Line	1993-10
Digital Arts Collection Vol. 10	Connect Line	Connect Line	1993-10
Digital Arts Collection Vol. 11	Connect Line	Connect Line	1993-10
Digital Arts Collection Vol. 12	Connect Line	Connect Line	1993-10
Digital Arts Collection Vol. 13	Connect Line	Connect Line	1993-10
Digital Arts Collection Vol. 14	Connect Line	Connect Line	1993-10
Fairy Tale Kaizokuban	FairyTale	Brother Kōgyō	1991-04-25
Fairy Tale Kaizokuban 2	FairyTale	Brother Kōgyō	1993-08-29
Floppy Bunko 1: Listener Club 0990 Vol. 1	Sixteens	Arkham Products	1992-07-28
Floppy Bunko 3: Bishōjo Graphic Data Shū Vol. 1	Effat	Effat	1992-07-26
Floppy Bunko 4: Bishōjo Graphic Data Shū Vol. 2	Effat	Effat	1992-07-26
Floppy Bunko 6: Bishōjo Graphic Data Shū Vol. 3	Effat	Effat	1992-08-26
Floppy Bunko 9: Bishōjo Graphic Data Shū Vol. 4	Effat	Effat	1992-10-26
Floppy Bunko 10: All Bishōjo Art Graphics Vol. 1	Arkham Products	Arkham Products	1992-10-26
Floppy Bunko 11: Listener Club 0990 Vol. 2	Sixteens	Arkham Products	1992-10-26
Floppy Bunko 13: Bishōjo Graphic Data Shū Vol. 5	Effat	Effat	1992-10-26
Floppy Bunko 14: Sadistic Games Syndrome Episode 1	Sixteens	Arkham Products	1992-12-18
Floppy Bunko 15: Bishōjo Graphic Data Shū Vol. 6	Effat	Effat	1992-11-26
Floppy Bunko 16: Bishōjo Graphic Data Shū Vol. 7	Effat	Effat	1992-11-26
Floppy Bunko 17: All Bishōjo Art Graphics Vol. 2	Arkham Products	Arkham Products	1993-03-26
Floppy Bunko 18: Bishōjo Graphic Data Shū Vol. 8	Effat	Effat	1992-12-26
Floppy Bunko 19: Bishōjo Graphic Data Shū Vol. 9	Effat	Effat	1993-01-26
Floppy Bunko 20: All Bishōjo Art Graphics Vol. 3	Arkham Products	Arkham Products	1993-06-26
Floppy Bunko 21: All Bishōjo Art Graphics Vol. 4	Arkham Products	Arkham Products	1993-08-26
Floppy Bunko 22: Bishōjo Graphic Data Shū Vol. 10	Effat	Effat	1993-02-26
Floppy Bunko 24: Sadistic Games Syndrome Episode 2	Sixteens	Arkham Products	1994-02-26
Floppy Bunko 25: Sadistic Games Syndrome Episode 3	Sixteens	Arkham Products	1994-03-26
Fushigi no Umi no Nadia: Music Floppy Disk	Gainax	Gainax	1992-10-23
Irokazu Kōjō Iinkai for Adult Dai-1-Shū	Arkham Products	Arkham Products	1994-03-01
Irokazu Kōjō Iinkai for Adult Dai-2-Shū	Arkham Products	Arkham Products	1994-04-01
Irokazu Kōjō Iinkai for Adult Dai-3-Shū	Arkham Products	Arkham Products	1994-05-01
Irokazu Kōjō Iinkai for Adult Dai-4-Shū	Arkham Products	Arkham Products	1994-06-01
Irokazu Kōjō Iinkai for Adult Dai-5-Shū	Arkham Products	Arkham Products	1994-08-01
Irokazu Kōjō Iinkai for Adult Dai-6-Shū	Arkham Products	Arkham Products	1994-09-01
Irokazu Kōjō Iinkai for Adult Dai-7-Shū	Arkham Products	Arkham Products	1994-10-01
Irokazu Kōjō Iinkai for Adult Dai-8-Shū	Arkham Products	Arkham Products	1994-11-01
Irokazu Kōjō Iinkai for Adult Dai-9-Shū	Arkham Products	Arkham Products	1995-02-01
Irokazu Kōjō Iinkai for Adult Dai-10-Shū	Arkham Products	Arkham Products	1995-03-01
Irokazu Kōjō Iinkai for Adult Dai-11-Shū	Arkham Products	Arkham Products	1995-04-01
Irokazu Kōjō Iinkai for Adult Dai-12-Shū	Arkham Products	Arkham Products	1995-05-01
Irokazu Kōjō Iinkai for Normal Dai-1-Shū	Arkham Products	Arkham Products	1994-03-01
Irokazu Kōjō Iinkai for Normal Dai-2-Shū	Arkham Products	Arkham Products	1994-04-01
Irokazu Kōjō Iinkai for Normal Dai-3-Shū	Arkham Products	Arkham Products	1994-05-01
Irokazu Kōjō Iinkai for Normal Dai-4-Shū	Arkham Products	Arkham Products	1994-06-01
Irokazu Kōjō Iinkai for Normal Dai-5-Shū	Arkham Products	Arkham Products	1994-08-01
Irokazu Kōjō Iinkai for Normal Dai-6-Shū	Arkham Products	Arkham Products	1994-09-01
Irokazu Kōjō Iinkai for Normal Dai-7-Shū	Arkham Products	Arkham Products	1994-10-01
Irokazu Kōjō Iinkai for Normal Dai-8-Shū	Arkham Products	Arkham Products	1994-11-01
Irokazu Kōjō Iinkai for Normal Dai-9-Shū	Arkham Products	Arkham Products	1995-02-01
Irokazu Kōjō Iinkai for Normal Dai-10-Shū	Arkham Products	Arkham Products	1995-03-01
Irokazu Kōjō Iinkai for Normal Dai-11-Shū	Arkham Products	Arkham Products	1995-04-01
Irokazu Kōjō Iinkai for Normal Dai-12-Shū	Arkham Products	Arkham Products	1995-05-01
Kenkō Sono 4	ZOOM Inc.	ZOOM Inc.	1992-12
Namco Video Game Music Library Vol. 1	Dempa	Dempa	1989-05-20
Pasocomic Purple Cat Vol. 1: Bunny Girl Tokushū	Palmtree Soft	Babylon	1993-03-16
PasoComic Purple Cat Vol. 2: Hospital Tokushū	Palmtree Soft	Babylon	1993-07-02
PasoComic Purple Cat Vol. 3: The Onna Kyōshi Tokushū	Palmtree Soft	Babylon	1993-10-08
PasoComic Purple Cat: Kokodake no Disk 1	Palmtree Soft	Babylon	1993-07-02
PasoComic PuruPuru Paradise: Santa Claus Tokushū	Palmtree Soft	Babylon	1994-01-14
Prism 68K	Wolf Team	Wolf Team	1992-10
Puppet Show Part 1	Artist Soft	Great Co., Ltd.	1989-06-20
Rance II Hint Disk	Alice Soft	Alice Soft	1990-07-13
Telenet Music Box	Nihon Telenet	Nihon Telenet	1989-10-13
Tokyo Joshikō: Seifuku o Nuida Zukan Part 1	New System House Oh!	New System House Oh!	1988-04
Tokyo Joshikō: Seifuku o Nuida Zukan Part 2	New System House Oh!	New System House Oh!	1988-04
Tokyo Joshikō: Seifuku o Nuida Zukan Part 3	New System House Oh!	New System House Oh!	1988-04
Tōshin Toshi Hint Disk	Alice Soft	Alice Soft	1991-06-15

== See also ==
- List of cancelled X68000 games
- Lists of video games
