= Aquales =

1991 video game

- Developer: Exact
- Publisher: Exact
- Designer: Hiroyuki Saegusa
- Programmer: Kazuki Toyota
- Artist: Toshimitsu Ōdaira
- Composer: Hiroshi Yamamoto
- Platform: X68000
- Release: JP: 12 September 1991
- Genres: Action role-playing, run and gun
- Mode: Single-player

Aquales (Note: Japanese: アクアレス, Hepburn: Akuaresu) is an action role-playing run and gun video game developed and published by Exact exclusively for the X68000 in Japan on September 12, 1991. The second title to be created and released by Exact for the X68000 platform, the game takes place in the dystopian future of 2069 where the British Elias-Rits Investigative Unit ship went missing during a reconnaissance operation at the Kermadec Islands, as players assume the role of American pilot Fredric von Nyuya from the elite World-Ocean Development League squad taking control of a mecha in an attempt to unveil the truth behind the mysterious disappearance of the Elias-Rits embarkation during their operation. Its gameplay mainly consists of action and shooting mixed with mission-based exploration, as well as role-playing elements, using a main two-button configuration.

Created by most of the same staff who previously worked on Naious, Aquales and its plotline were initially envisioned as a manga series of 600 pages spanning over 13 volumes, but the storyline for the seventh volume was condensed into the game project. Though it was initially launched by Exact on retail stores, the game would later be distributed through the Takeru software vending machines, which allowed users to write games on blank floppy disks.

Aquales became another popular title among the X68000 userbase from Exact and received praise for the graphics, music and gameplay that would eventually lead it to being nominated for a "Game of the Year" award by Japanese magazine Oh!X under its genre. Commercially however, it did not sell well when it was initially released. Despite being exclusive to Japan, it has been retrospectively referred by publications such as Retro Gamer to be one of the best titles for the system. After its initial release, Exact would go on to develop their third title for the X68000, Étoile Princesse, which was released two years later to a similarly positive critical and audience response.

== Gameplay ==
Gameplay screenshot

Aquales is a side-scrolling action role-playing platform game with run and gun elements similar to Bionic Commando, Front Mission: Gun Hazard and Target Earth, where players assume the role of pilot Fredric von Nyuya from the elite W-ODL squad taking control of a mecha through eight stages of varying thematic set on a dystopian Earth, fighting enemies and bosses at the end of the each stage in order to unveil the truth behind the disappearance of the Elias-Rits embarkation during their assignation as the main objective. Prior to starting, players have access to the configuration menu at the title screen of the game, where various settings can be adjusted. When starting a new game, the players are equipped with a number of weapons and tools under their disposal that can be expanded by finding new weapons, which are divided into four categories and most of them have their own advantages and disadvantages between each other, as well as items that are hidden in chests across each stage.

By defeating enemies, players gain XP in order to increase their current experience level, health and attack output. Controlling the mech is done with a directional pad, which moves the player character left and right, as well as both an attack and a jump button. Pushing the jump button while in mid-air activates a grappling hook that can allow the mech to pull forward, swing from the ceiling of any platform or jump into the latched platform. Pressing both action buttons and down at the same time allows access to the inventory screen to choose a weapon. Once a stage is completed, the players' current progress is automatically saved. If the mech sustains too much enemy damage, the players lose a live and once all lives are lost, the game is over.

== Synopsis ==
The plot of Aquales begins in the year 2042, where 70% of the land on Earth is now covered by bodies of water due to the depletion of ozone and greenhouse effects caused by humankind, which resulted in the polar ice caps melting that raised the sea level at an alarmingly quick pace, leaving almost no terrain as a result. With the overpopulation of the remaining lands and the possibility of space colonization not being realizable yet, a major scientific research initiative in regards of sustaining life on the ocean is made, leading to the development of a Kermadic Trench at the Kermadec Islands in New Zealand. 27 years later, 82% of the planetary surface was now covered in water and the trench was still under the development phase, making the United Nations desperate for answers due to the lack of progression and sent the British Elias-Rits Investigative Unit ship for a reconnaissance operation, but contact with the unit eventually stopped. Another team was deployed in order to investigate the mysterious disappearance of the Elias-Rits embarkation during their operation but with no success and, due to further research required exploring hostile environments in the deep sea, authorities dispatched a special elite squad known as World-Ocean Development League (W-ODL), which are renowned for piloting the Mid-Stanry submarine, to unveil the whereabouts of the ship, with the players assuming the role of American pilot Fredric von Nyuya controlling an advanced humanoid mecha.

== Development and release ==
Aquales was the game developed and published by Exact for the X68000 and it was originally planned to be a manga series of 600 pages with over 13 volumes worth of storyline, but the plot for the seventh volume was instead condensed into a video game project, which was created by most of the same staff who previously worked on Naious, their first game project for the X68000. The game was first planned for a retail release on August 24, 1991, before being ultimately released on September 12 of the same year with a retail price of JP¥8,700. It was later distributed through the Takeru software vending machines, which allowed users of the machine to download games by inserting a blank floppy disk. In August 1992, a music album containing the original soundtrack composed by Hiroshi Yamamoto and Hiroyuki Saegusa, as well as arranged renditions of the soundtrack was released in Japan by Apollon.

== Reception ==
Reception

Review scores
Publication	Score
Oh!X	9/10
Technopolis	4/7

Aquales was positively received by the audience and critics alike since its release, eventually proving to be another popular title from Exact among the X68000 userbase in Japan. Nishikawa Zenji from Oh!X magazine praised multiple aspects such as the graphics, music and gameplay. It was nominated for a "Game of the Year" award from Oh!X magazine under its genre, alongside other titles. Despite the positive reception, it did not sell well during its original release. In a retrospective review, John Szczepaniak of Retro Gamer praised the visuals, audio and gameplay, regarding it as one of the best titles on the computer.
