= Twinkle Tale =

1992 video game

- Developer: ZAP Corporation (uncredited)
- Publisher: Wonder Amusement Studio
- Producer: A. Satoh
- Designer: H. Hayashi
- Programmers: N. Saitoh; Toyohiko Yoshimine
- Artists: M. Tamura; S. Kurosawa; Takeshi Kajii
- Composer: Hiroshi Nishikawa
- Platform: Sega Mega Drive
- Release: JP: 24 July 1992
- Genre: Run and gun
- Mode: Single-player

Twinkle Tale (Note: Japanese: ツインクル テール, Hepburn: Tsuinkuru Tēru) is a run and gun video game developed by ZAP Corporation and published by Wonder Amusement Studio exclusively for the Sega Mega Drive in Japan on 24 July 1992. It was both the last project created by ZAP, as well as the only title to be released by Wonder Amusement Studio, which was a subsidiary of Japanese record label company Toyo Recording.

Taking place in the fantasy world of Alpherion, the players take control of young apprentice magician Saria on a journey to rescue the great wizards of her land from their captivity and recover the powerful gemstones from the dark sorcerer Gadou and his followers before the demonic king of darkness, Kaiser Demon, is summoned and brings chaos to both the land of Alpherion and the world. Its gameplay mainly consists of run and gun action mixed with minimal exploration elements, using a main three-button configuration.

Despite being exclusive to Japan, Twinkle Tale received generally positive reception from critics who reviewed it as an import title since its release and was commended for the detailed presentation, colorful visuals, gameplay and replay value but some of the reviewers felt divided in regards to the music and sound design. In recent years, the title has since become an expensive collector's item and one of the rarest in the Mega Drive library, leading it to fetch high prices in the secondary video game collecting market. The game has never been officially released outside Japan, although fan translations exist.

== Gameplay ==
Gameplay screenshot

Twinkle Tale is a run and gun game that is played in a top-down perspective similar to Étoile Princesse, Kiki Kaikai and Mercs, where the players take control of Saria, the main protagonist of the game, through nine stages of varying thematic set in the land of Alpherion where the main objective is to rescue each of the great wizards of the land and recover the kingdom's powerful gemstones from Gadou, one of the main antagonists of the game by defeating one of his servants, along with one of his creations that act like a boss at the end of the stage in to progress further through the game. The player has access to the options menu at the title screen before starting the game, where various settings can be adjusted such as controls and difficulty configurations.

Some of the levels featured are linear courses where the player must run, shoot, and dodge obstacles and enemies. Several stages are non-linear, however, with various paths that encourage the player to explore and find items. The player can find many types of item hidden in treasure chests, such as star-marked orbs that increase the number of times Saria can use magic, magical bombs, and vials that restore the player's health. If the player is fully powered up, the items will instead grant different bonuses.

Controlling Saria is done with the controller's directional pad, which moves the player character in eight directions. Pressing the A button activates the magic bomb, while B is used to shoot and C allows to change between different magic attacks in real-time. After completing a stage, the player's total health is increased, as the Saria starts off with a three-bar life gauge. Once all health is lost, the players have a limited number of continues to keep playing before the game is over. If the game is completed on the highest difficulty, an extra difficulty level is unlocked at the options menu.

== Plot ==
In the beginning, darkness and silence prevailed before the creation of the world until three lights red, green and blue were born within. Desiring domination, these light began in trying to destroy each one until their constant conflict spawned two black and white lights in the process. Wanting peace, the white light confined the other four lights and itself into gemstones representative of their colors which, after their powers were in complete harmony, the land of Alpherion was born as a result, where the events of Twinkle Tale takes place. Saria, a young apprentice magician, is summoned by her mentor on going to the Picket Village in order to consult the fortune teller Raza about an important matter that day. When being inquired by the young apprentice magician, Raza alerts her of a rebellion stirred by the dark wizard Gadou with his legion of monsters by capturing the great wizards of Alpherion, one of which being the young apprentice's mentor, that could potentially lead Alpherion fall under his control if he is not stopped. As a result, Raza bestows upon Saria three magical items so she can go and defeat Gadou and his forces.

Saria travels to the plains of Talon and reaches the castle of her mentor, the great red wizard Olof, to rescue him. Once freed from his captivity, Olof explains to Saria that one of the reasons for the rebellion to occur was due to Gadou violating the ban in not using the powers of his gemstone, an onyx, for personal use to control the darkness and communicate with hell, as well as trying to increase his strength through black magic, which infuriated the king of the land and imprisoned him on his castle and barely managed to confiscate the onyx, with him also informing to her that the main source of his powers, a ruby, was taken away and he has gone to the diamond palace to protect the king, but not before telling her to rescue his comrades. Saria goes through the land's vine ravines before arriving and rescuing the great green wizard Dohla on his castle, who regretfully tells her that his emerald was also taken way. He further explains to her that another reason for the rebellion is to summon a powerful demon king from hell by using the powers of each gemstone and that she must have to save the great blue wizard Elan before departing to the Diamond palace in order to protect the king alongside Olof. After going through the caves of Rield, Saria rescue Elan in his castle, whose sapphire was also stolen as well. Saria plans in heading towards the mountain range of Zard, where the castle of Gadou is located, with Elan granting her the ability to fly with a magical robe before going to protect the king with his comrades.

Saria arrives to the castle of Gadou, who is lying fatally injured on a pentagram symbol and tells her that Kaiser Demon was summoned by his servants. He also explains his motivation for the rebellion and reveals the true culprits before dying, with Saria quickly departing to the palace in order to kill the king of darkness. Saria reaches the king's room before meeting with the great wizards, who tells her that Kaiser Demon is creating a breach between Alpherion and hell, but warns her that she cannot come back after entering the room without killing Kaiser Demon. After an arduous battle, Kaiser Demon is eventually killed, with the great wizards and the king congratulating Saria for her heroic efforts, with the latter being able to grant a wish for her. Saria ask the king in forgiving the deceased Gadou for his misled actions and bury his remains on Zard, to which the king agrees in doing so. Saria departs from the palace and her master to look upon the horizon, marking both an end to her journey and the birth of a new legend.

== Development and release ==
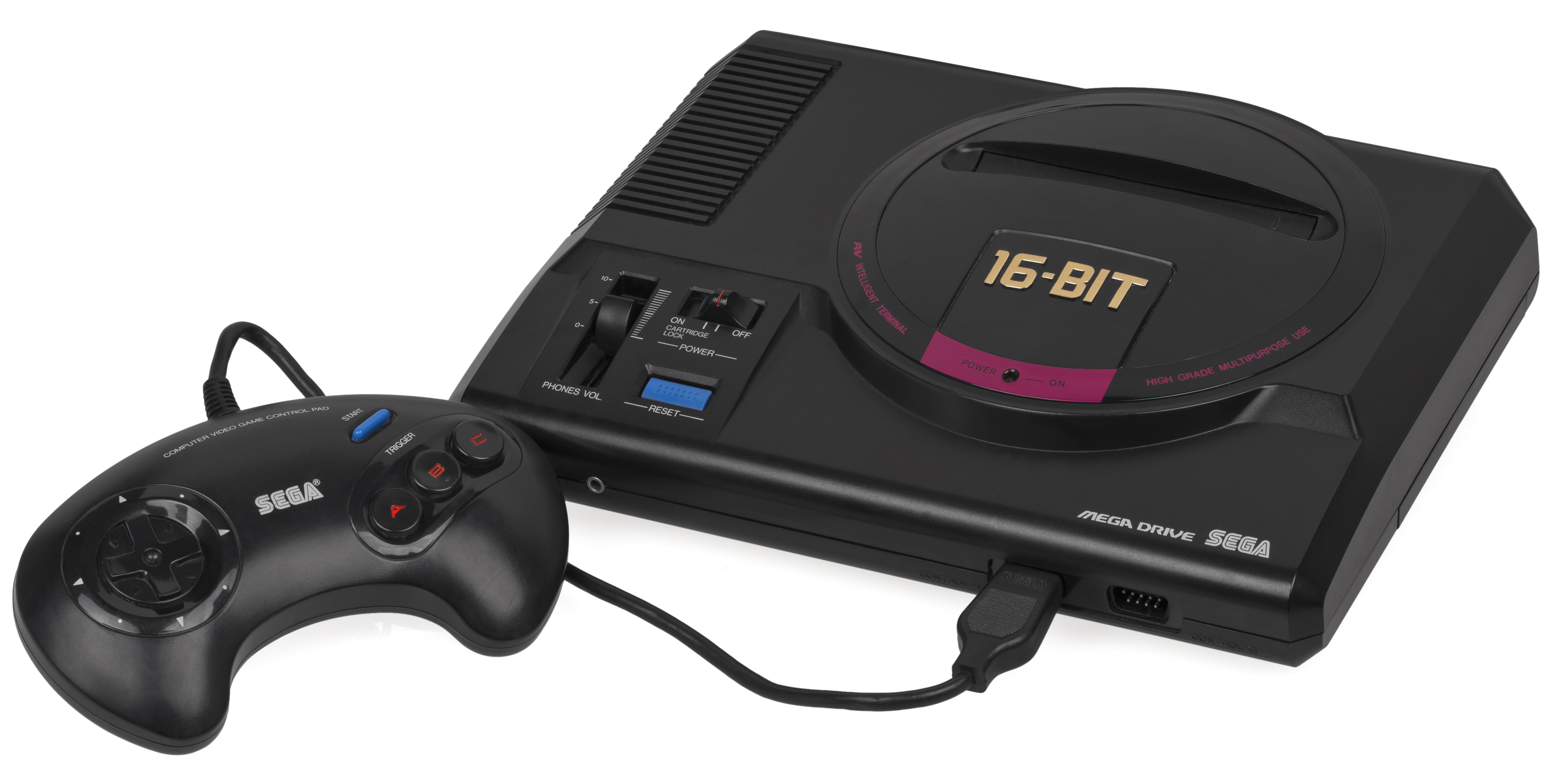
Twinkle Tale was the last project created by ZAP and the only game published by Wonder Amusement Studio for Mega Drive.

Twinkle Tale was the last game to be created by ZAP Corporation, who previously worked on projects such as the conversion of Summer Games for the Master System and Dead Moon for the TurboGrafx-16 before the company was disbanded after its release, although they are not credited as such in the credits of the game or the manual. It was published by Wonder Amusement Studio, a subsidiary of Japanese record label company Toyo Recording, exclusively in Japan on 24 July 1992, becoming the only title to be released under their game publishing label. Early previews showcased the side status bar with a different art style, which was changed before release. Twinkle Tale has not been officially released outside Japan, but an English fan translation exists.

== Reception ==
Reception

Aggregate score
Aggregator	Score
GameRankings	90%

Review scores
Publication	Score
Ação Games	18 / 18
Beep! Mega Drive	6.75 / 10
Famitsu	21 / 40
Joypad	85%
Joystick	79%
Mean Machines Sega	88 / 100
Mega	62%
Mega Drive Advanced Gaming	78%
MegaTech	88%
Play Time	85%
Sega Force	91%
Sega Power	66%
Sega Pro	83 / 100; 83 / 100
Video Games	61%

Twinkle Tale received generally positive reviews. Famitsu gave it a score of 21 out of 40. Retro Gamer praised the game too.

=== Legacy ===
Since its initial release, Twinkle Tale has become one of the rarest Mega Drive titles, alongside other coveted titles such as Alien Soldier and MUSHA, with copies of the game fetching over US$300 on the secondary video game collecting market.
