= List of Legend of the Galactic Heroes media =

The following is a list of media related to the long-running series Legend of the Galactic Heroes.

== Novels ==
No.	Title	Original release date	English release date
1	Dawn; Reimei-hen (黎明篇)	November 30, 1982; 4-19-152624-3	March 8, 2016; 978-1421584942
1. An Outline of the History of the Galaxy (銀河系史概略); 2. In Eternal Night (永遠の夜の中で); 3. The Battle of Astarte (アスターテ会戦); 4. Empire's Fading Glow (帝国の残照); 5. Birth of the Thirteenth Fleet (第一三艦隊誕生); 6. Attack on Iserlohn (イゼルローン攻略); 7. To Everyman His Star (それぞれの星); 8. A Farce Between the Acts (幕間狂言); 9. Lines of Death (死線); 10. Amlitsar (アムリッツァ); 11. A New Prologue (新たなる序章)
2	Ambition; Yabō-hen (野望篇)	September 30, 1983; 4-19-152790-8	July 19, 2016; 978-1421584959
1. Before the Storm (嵐の前); 2. Ignition Point (発火点); 3. The Yang Fleet Mobilizes (ヤン艦隊出動); 4. Bloodshed in Space (流血の宇宙); 5. The Battle of the Dorir Stellar Zone (ドーリア星域の会戦); 6. Valor and Fidelity (勇気と忠誠)); 7. A Victory of Whom? (誰がための勝利); 8. The Golden Bough Falls (ゴールデンバウムは倒れた); 9. Farewell, Distant Days (さらば、遠き日)
3	Endurance; Shifuku-hen (雌伏篇)	April 30, 1984; 4-19-152894-7	November 15, 2016; 978-1421584966
1. First Flight (初陣); 2. The Fortress Takes Flight (はばたく禿鷹); 3. One Slender Thread (細い一本の糸); 4. Things Lost (失われたもの); 5. Court of Inquiry (査問会); 6. A Battle Without Weapons (武器なき戦い); 7. Fortress Versus Fortress (要塞対要塞); 8. Return (帰還); 9. Resolve and Ambition (決意と野心と)
4	Stratagem; Sakubō-hen (策謀篇)	October 31, 1984; 4-19-152978-1	June 20, 2017; 978-1421584973
1. Thunderclap (雷鳴); 2. The Maze (迷路); 3. An Arrow Released (矢は放たれた); 4. The Legitimate Government of the Galactic Empire (銀河帝国正統政府); 5. A Start (ひとつの出発); 6. Operation: Ragnarok (作戦名「神々の黄昏」); 7. A military attaché: Ensign Mintz (駐在武官ミンツ少尉); 8. Invitation to a Requiem (鎮魂曲への招待); 9. Fezzan Occupied (フェザーン占領)
5	Mobilization; Kazagumo-hen (風雲篇)	April 30, 1985; 4-19-153068-2	November 21, 2017; 978-1421584980
1. The Cold Spell Cometh (寒波到る); 2. Admiral Yang's Fleet of Arks (ヤン提督の箱舟隊); 3. Seeking A Free Universe (自由の宇宙を求めて); 4. The Hydra (双頭の蛇); 5. The Darkness at Dawn (暁闇); 6. Battle after Battle (連戦); 7. Battle of Vermillion (バーミリオン); 8. Desperate Fight (死闘); 9. A Sudden Change (急転); 10. "Long Live the Emperor!" (「皇帝万歳！」)
6	Flight; Hishou-hen (飛翔篇)	October 31, 1985; 4-19-153151-4	November 17, 2018; 978-1421584997
1. The Fall of Earth (地球衰亡の記録); 2. Kümmel Affair (キュンメル事件); 3. Portrait of a Certain Pensioner (ある年金生活者の肖像); 4. Visitors (訪問者); 5. Past, Present, Future (過去、現在、未来); 6. Confusion, Confusion, Confusion (混乱、錯乱、惑乱); 7. Holy Land (聖地); 8. Combat Play (コンバット・プレイ); 9. The End of Vacation (休暇は終りぬ)
7	Tempest; Dotou-hen (怒濤篇)	May 31, 1986; 4-19-153256-1	August 21, 2018; 978-1421585291
1. Under the Goldenlöwe (黄金獅子旗の下に); 2. Against All Flags (すべての旗に背いて); 3. "Ragnarok" Once More (「神々の黄昏」ふたたび); 4. Liberation, Revolution, Plotting, Etc. (解放・革命・謀略その他); 5. Prodigal Son's Homecoming (蕩児たちの帰宅); 6. Battle of Starzone Mal-Adetta (マル・アデッタ星域の会戦); 7. Imperial Edict of the Winter Rose Garden (冬バラ園の勅令); 8. The Long Road Ahead (前途遼遠); 9. Before the Sacrifice (祭りの前)
8	Desolation; Rari-hen (乱離篇)	January 31, 1987; 4-19-153384-3	December 11, 2018; 978-1421585017
1. Roaring Winds into the Corridor (風は回廊へ); 2. April Breeze (春の嵐); 3. The Invincible and the Undefeated (常勝と不敗と); 4. Kaleidoscope (万華鏡); 5. The Magician Returns Not (魔術師、還らず); 6. After the Sacrifice (祭りの後); 7. Triumphant Return With Disappointment (失意の凱旋); 8. Edict: Capital Move (遷都令); 9. The New Government of August (八月の新政府)
9	Upheaval; Kaiten-hen (回天篇)	May 31, 1987; 4-19-153445-9	July 16, 2019; 978-1421585024
1. In the Distant Border (辺境にて); 2. Roses at Summer's End (夏の終わりのバラ); 3. Rumbling (鳴動); 4. Burgeoning (発芽); 5. The Urvashi Affair (ウルヴァシー事件); 6. Rebellion is Hero's Right (叛逆は英雄の特権); 7. Live with the Sword... (剣に生き……); 8. Die with the Sword (剣に斃れ); 9. Endless Requiem (終わりなき鎮魂曲)
10	Sunset; Rakujitsu-hen (落日篇)	November 15, 1987; 4-19-153530-7	November 19, 2019; 978-1421585048
1. Birth of the Kaiserin (皇妃誕生); 2. Invitation to a Riot (動乱への誘い); 3. Cosmic Mosaic (コズミック・モザイク); 4. Towards Peace, Through Bloodshed (平和へ、流血経由); 5. Planet of Confusion (昏迷の惑星); 6. The Stechpalme Schloß Inferno (柊館炎上); 7. Crimson Star-Road (深紅の星路); 8. Brünhild Thirsts for Blood (美姫は血を欲す); 9. The Goldenlöwe Dimmed (黄金獅子旗に光なし); 10. An End to Dreaming (夢、見果てたり)

== Prequels and side stories ==
No.	Title	Japanese release date	Japanese ISBN
1	The Star Crusher; Hoshi o Kudaku Mono (星を砕く者)	April 30, 1986	4-19-153236-7
1. The Third Tiamat Battle (第三次ティアマト会戦); 2. Cobweb (蜘蛛の巣); 3. The Klopstock Incident (クロプシュトック事件); 4. Enforcing Rules (軍規を正す); 5. Interlude (間奏曲); 6. The Actress Exits (女優退場); 7. Enemy, Ally, Enemy, Enemy, Enemy... (敵、味方、敵、敵、敵……); 8. Planet Legniza (惑星レグニツァ); 9. My Conquest is the Sea of Stars (わが征くは星の大海)
2	Julian's Iserlohn Diary; Yurian no Izerurōn Nikki (ユリアンのイゼルローン日記)	March 31, 1987	4-19-153418-1
1. Events in the Even Number Year (偶数年のできごと); 2. The First Salary (はじめての給料); 3. All Sets (全員集合); 4. Proposal From the Empire (帝国の提案); 5. Old Resident vs. New Resident (旧住民 vs 新住民); 6. Prisoner-of-War Exchange Ceremony (捕虜交換式); 7. The Dalton Incident (ドールトン事件); 8. Secret Session on Bench (ベンチの秘密会議); 9. Night Before Launch (出撃前夜)
3	A Hundred Billion Stars, a Hundred Billion Lights; Sen Oku no Hoshi, Sen Oku no Hikari (千億の星、千億の光)	March 31, 1988	4-19-153634-6
1. The Battle of the Van-Fleet Stellar Region (ヴァンフリート星域の会戦); 2. Drei Rot (三つの赤); 3. Bloodstained April (染血の四月); 4. Chronicle of the Aftermath of a Free-For-All (混戦始末記); 5. Early Summer, Strong Wind (初夏、風強し); 6. Candidate to Succeed the Household of a Count (伯爵家後継候補); 7. Truth is the Daughter of Time (真実は時の娘); 8. A Hundred Billion Stars, a Single Ambition (千億の星、ひとつの野心)
4	Spiral Labyrinth; Rasen Meikyū (螺旋迷宮)	July 31, 1989	4-19-153995-7
1. The Hero's New Assignment (英雄のあたらしい仕事); 2. A Modest Journey Into the Past (過去へのささやかな旅); 3. Chronicle of the Second Tiamat Battle (第二次ティアマト会戦記); 4. Between Mourning & Military Clothes (喪服と軍服の間); 5. Prison Planet (収容所惑星); 6. Prisoners & Hostages (捕虜と人質); 7. Microscopic Insurrection (顕微鏡サイズの反乱); 8. Thread From the Past (過去からの糸); 9. Journey in Search of an Exit (出口をさがす旅)
5	Golden Wings; Ougon no Tsubasa (黄金の翼)	June 25, 2009	4-48-872515-5
1. Chronicle of the Battle of Dagon (ダゴン星域会戦記); 2. Silver-White Valley (白銀の谷); 3. Golden Wings (黄金の翼); 4. Dream of the Morning, Song of Night (朝の夢、夜の歌); 5. Disgrace (汚名); 6. Long interview with Yoshiki Tanaka (田中芳樹ロングインタビュー)

== Anime series ==
=== Main OVA series ===
The 26-episode season 1 (or the first part), released between December 1988 and June 1989, covers the volumes 1 and 2 of the original novels, adding some prequel stories (episodes 9 and 11) and original stories (parts of episodes 13 and 14). The 28-episode season 2, released between June 1991 and February 1992, covers the volumes 3 to 5. The 32-episode season 3, released between July 1994 and February 1995, covers the volumes 6 to 8. The 24-episode season 4, released between September 1996 and March 1997, covers the volumes 9 and 10.

== Video games ==
Several video games based on Legend of the Galactic Heroes have been released for various platforms, including an online multiplayer strategy game. All of them have been released exclusively in Japan. Most of these games were published by Bothtec and Tokuma Shoten.

=== PC ===
- Legend of the Galactic Heroes (1989; PC-9801, PC-8801, X68000, MSX2)
- Legend of the Galactic Heroes: Power-up and Scenario Collection (1989; PC-9801E, PC-8801, X68000, MSX2)
- Legend of the Galactic Heroes II (1990; PC-9801, X68000, MSX2)
- Legend of the Galactic Heroes II DX (1990; PC-9801, X68000, MSX2)
- Legend of the Galactic Heroes III (1993; PC-9801, X68000)
- Legend of the Galactic Heroes III SP (1993; PC-9801, DOS/V, FM Towns, Windows 95)
- Legend of the Galactic Heroes IV (1994; PC-9801)
- Legend of the Galactic Heroes IV EX Kit (1994; PC-9801)
- Legend of the Galactic Heroes IV EX Set (1994; PC-9801)
- Legend of the Galactic Heroes IV EX (1994; Windows 95)
- Legend of the Galactic Heroes V (1998; Windows 95)
- Legend of the Galactic Heroes V grand (1998; Windows 95)
- Legend of the Galactic Heroes VI (2000; Windows 95)
- Legend of the Galactic Heroes VI SG (2000, Windows 98)
- Legend of the Galactic Heroes VS (2003, Windows 98)
- Legend of the Galactic Heroes VII (2004, Windows 2000)
- Legend of the Galactic Heroes (2008, Windows XP)

=== Consoles ===
- Legend of the Galactic Heroes (1988/12/21, Family Computer)
- Legend of the Galactic Heroes (1992/9/25, Super Famicom)
- Legend of the Galactic Heroes (1996/12/6, Sega Saturn)
- Legend of the Galactic Heroes Plus (1997/10/23, Sega Saturn)
- Legend of the Galactic Heroes (1998/5/28, PlayStation)
- Chibi Character Game: Legend of the Galactic Heroes (1999/5/27, PlayStation)
- Click Manga: Legend of the Galactic Heroes Vol. 1 (1999/9/30, PlayStation)
- Click Manga: Legend of the Galactic Heroes Vol. 2 (1999/11/18, PlayStation)

=== Other ===
Legend of the Galactic Heroes: Rondo of War is an HTML5 browser game launched worldwide on the G123 online platform published by CTW, in 2023. The game was made to commemorate the 40th anniversary of the original novel series.

== Board game ==
A board game has been released in 1998.
