= List of cancelled X68000 games =

This is a list of cancelled games for the X68000.

== List ==
There are currently 21 games on this list. (Note: This number is always up to date by this script.)

List of cancelled X68000 games
Title(s)	Notes/Reasons	Developer	Publisher
The Adventure of Little Ralph	A PlayStation version was released.	New Corporation	New Corporation
Air Buster	Gameplay footage exists. No prototype has surfaced.	Kaneko	Kaneko
Alternative-3	No prototype has surfaced.	M.N.M Software	M.N.M Software
Animahjong X	No prototype has surfaced.	Sogna	Sogna
Blade of the Great Elements	Released on Sega Mega Drive as Jewel Master.	Amusement	Amusement
Chikyū Bōei Miracle Force	No prototype has surfaced.	Cybertech Custom	Cybertech Custom
Crying: Aseimei Sensō	Released on Sega Mega Drive.	—	—
Defender of the Crown	Development was halted for unknown reasons. No prototype has surfaced.	Bullet-Proof Software	Bullet-Proof Software
Faldia	No prototype has surfaced.	M.N.M Software	M.N.M Software
Gauntlet	Conversion of the 1985 arcade original. Showcased to Tengen and released on Sega Mega Drive as Gauntlet IV. No prototype has surfaced.	M2	—
Golf Contraction	No prototype has surfaced.	Zainsoft	Zainsoft
Naughty Boy	Conversion of the 1982 arcade original by Jaleco. Gameplay footage exists.	Kiyoshi Sakai	—
Out Run	Conversion was left unfinished due to Hertz' company management cancelling its development. No prototype has surfaced.	Hertz	Hertz
Program	No prototype has surfaced.	M.N.M Software	M.N.M Software
Ryūko no Ken	No prototype has surfaced.	Magical Company	Magical Company
Same! Same! Same!	No prototype has surfaced.	Kaneko	Kaneko
Tatsujin	No prototype has surfaced.	Kaneko	Kaneko
Traum	Screenshots and artwork exists. No prototype has surfaced.	M.N.M Software	M.N.M Software
Umihara Kawase	Released on Super Famicom. Gameplay footage exists. Currently under ownership of former TNN designer Kiyoshi Sakai.	TNN	—
Viper-V10: Turbo 3.6	Advertised in the manual of Viper-V8: Twin Turbo. No prototype has surfaced.	Sogna	Sogna
Yume Dokei	No prototype has surfaced.	M.N.M Software	M.N.M Software

== See also ==
- List of X68000 games
- Lists of video games
