= Arcus II: Silent Symphony =

1989 video game

- Developer(s): Wolf Team
- Publisher(s): Wolf Team
- Composer(s): Motoi Sakuraba; Masaaki Uno; Yasunori Shiono
- Platform(s): Sharp X68000, NEC PC-8801, NEC PC-9801, MSX2
- Release: JP: 1989
- Genre(s): Adventure

Arcus II: Silent Symphony (アークスII サイレントシンフォニー, Ākusu II Sairento Shinfonī) is a computer game developed and released in Japan by Wolf Team. Narumi Kakinouchi, co-creator of Vampire Princess Miyu, was the art director for this game. The music for the game was composed by Masaaki Uno, Motoi Sakuraba, and Yasunori Shiono.

== See also ==
- Arcus Odyssey
