= Die Bahnwelt =

1992 video game

- Developer: Glodia
- Publisher: Glodia
- Platform: X68000
- Release: JP: October 30, 1992
- Genre: Run and gun
- Mode: Single-player

Die Bahnwelt (Japanese: バーンウェルト) is a multidirectional run and gun video game released for the X68000 in 1992 by Glodia.

== Gameplay ==
Gameplay screenshot

A cutscene

The player directly moves one character in three dimensions in an overhead perspective through science fiction themed dungeons. The player can shoot in eight directions. There are also different second characters that the player can indirectly control through AI. There are multiple weapons that can be collected that can be switched at will. There is a life bar that regenerates if no damage is taken for a period of time. The game has a save system. The game also contains many anime cutscenes. There is an English fan translation available for this game. The game is currently freeware.
