= Arcus Odyssey =

1991 video game

- Developer: Wolf Team
- Publishers: JP: Wolf Team; NA: Renovation Products (Genesis); JP: Sammy Corporation (SFC)
- Producers: David Izat; Masaaki Uno; Masahiro Akishino
- Programmer: Fumiaki Fukaya
- Artists: Akihiro Kabaya; Akiko Higurashi; Kazuhiro Nagata; Mutsumi Inomata
- Writer: T. Yamada
- Composer: Motoi Sakuraba
- Series: Arcus
- Platforms: Sega Mega Drive/Genesis, X68000, Super Famicom
- Release: Mega Drive/Genesis: JP: June 14, 1991; NA: September 1991; X68000: JP: June 29, 1991; Super Famicom: JP: October 22, 1993
- Genre: Action role-playing game
- Mode: Single-player

Arcus Odyssey is a 1991 action game developed by Wolf Team and released by Renovation Products for the Sega Genesis and X68000 and in 1993 for the Super Nintendo Entertainment System. The game features an isometric perspective and cooperative gameplay with hack and slash elements. It tells the story of four heroes trying to thwart the return of an evil sorceress.

Arcus Odyssey is part of the Arcus franchise, that also included Arcus in 1988, Arcus II: Silent Symphony in 1989, and Arcus III in 1991. A North American version for the SNES was planned, but it was cancelled following Sega's acquisition of Renovation Products (American publisher for Wolf Team and Telenet games). It was released only in Japan with the title Arcus Spirits, and was also planned to be released in Europe by Loriciels.

== Gameplay ==
In Arcus Odyssey, the player takes on the role of one of four different characters, and proceeds through each level in order. The player is able to move, attack, defend with a shield, and use a variety of offensive, defensive, and recovery items and magic, all of which can be found in chests scattered throughout the levels. Some levels require the player to accomplish subquests in order to proceed, such as extinguishing a fire blocking the door to the next level; other levels give the player an ally.

The game primarily has an isometric view, although the player's characters can move freely in eight directions. After defeating most bosses, the player receives a power boost. This boost either gives the player more health or more power.

== Plot ==
Hundreds of years ago, the powerful dark sorceress Castomira sought to destroy the land of Arcus and remake it into a place of chaos and darkness. The only person powerful enough to stop her was Princess Leaty, a good sorceress and the granddaughter to the legendary King of Light. Leaty challenged Castomira and the two fought for days on end, but the powers of the light eventually overwhelmed the witch, who was banished to the Dark World for all eternity. Foreseeing the possible return of Castomira, Leaty created a magical sword known as "The Power of Leaty" and trusted its safekeeping with the King of Arcus.

Now, a millennium later, Castomira's followers have stolen the Sword in order to revive their mistress as the power of darkness grows stronger by the day. Only the powers of four brave heroes can prevent a second coming of Castomira and return peace to Arcus. They are: Jedda Chef the swordsman, Diana Fireya the archer; Erin Gashuna the warrior-maiden; and Bead Shia the mage. At the end of the game, the players are given a choice between either using the sword to defeat Castomira or helping the witch regain her power.

== Reception ==
Reception

Review scores
Publication	Score
ACE	863/1000 (Mega Drive)
Dragon	4/5 (Genesis)
Electronic Gaming Monthly	35/50 (Super Famicom)
GamePro	12.5/20 (Genesis)
Video Games (DE)	63% (Mega Drive)
Console XS	92% (Mega Drive)

Arcus Odyssey received mostly mixed reviews. David Upchurch of ACE scored it 863/1000, writing: "To put it simply, Arcus Oddysey is one of the finest examples of the arcade adventure genre to appear on the Megadrive." Dragon gave the game 4 out of 5 stars and commented: "A few gamers might not enjoy having to explore twisted caves in order to attain to the next higher level; hackers would probably prefer to blow everything to bits. Although this product is not entirely original, Renovation is offering consumers quite a successful game in Arcus Odyssey." German magazine Video Games gave it 63%.

Electronic Gaming Monthly had five reviewers each give the Super Famicom version a 7 out of 10, commenting that it "has an interesting perspective and enough characters to keep things interesting." GamePro criticized the lack of improvements from the Genesis version, describing the graphics as "small and crowded" with little detail or variety. They concluded "If you're looking for an interesting game with little to offer but average graphics and better-than-average music, then this is for you. True RPG fans, though, may want to ... hold out for meatier titles."
