= CTW Inc. =

Japanese video game company

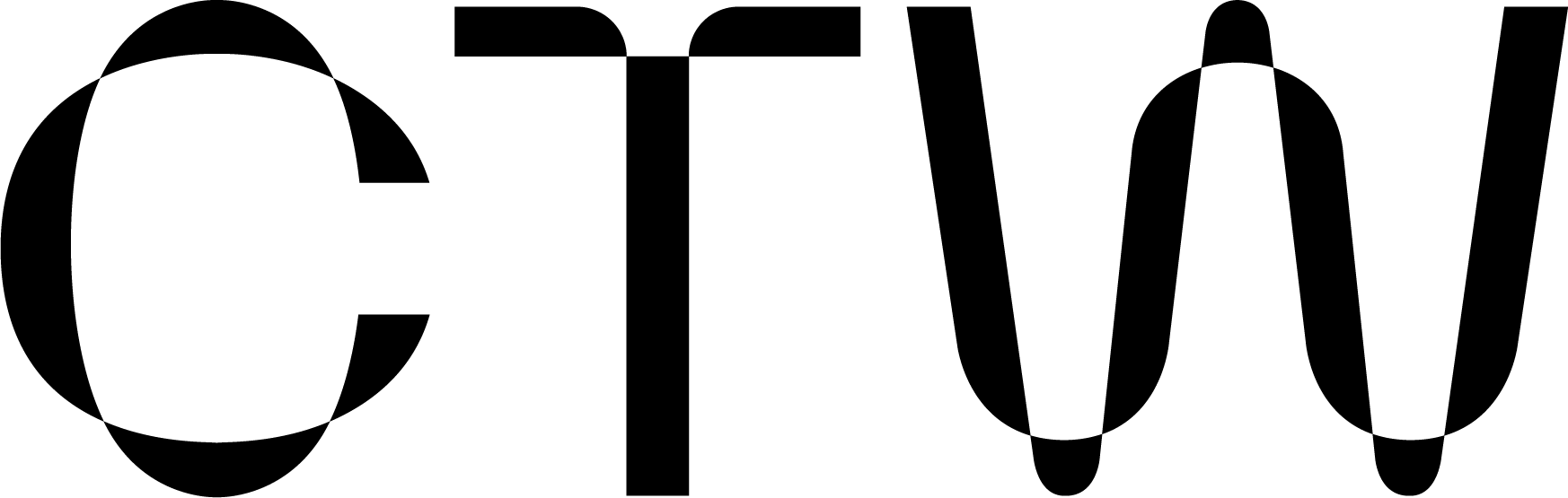
- Native name: CTW株式会社
- Type: Kabushiki gaisha
- ISIN: KYG2589A1058
- Industry: Video games
- Founded: August 14, 2013
- Founder: Ryuichi Sasaki
- Headquarters: Tokyo, Japan
- Area served: Worldwide
- Products: G123
- Number of employees: 350 (2026)
- Parent: CTW (formerly CTW Cayman PubCo)
- Website: ctw.inc

CTW Inc. is a Japanese video game company based in Tokyo. It is mainly known for its browser-based gaming platform, G123.

== History ==
CTW Inc. (originally CTW株式会社) was founded in August 2013, with Ryuichi Sasaki as president. CTW transitioned to developing HTML5-based browser games in the mid-2010s.

In October 2018, CTW launched its gaming platform, G123, which provides instant-play games primarily adapted from popular anime and manga franchises. By 2024, its users had increased to more than 500 million.

In 2021, CTW began expanding its international operations and released localized versions of its games in English and other languages.

In 2023, CTW reorganized under a Cayman Islands entity as CTW Cayman. Two years later, in 2025, CTW filed to list on the Nasdaq as CTW Cayman.

On August 6, 2025, CTW Cayman was listed on the Nasdaq.

In August 2025, the UK Advertising Standards Authority upheld three complaints against CTW over YouTube advertisements for High School D×D: Operation Paradise Infinity that had run in June 2025, finding they breached the CAP code; CTW withdrew the advertisements and said it was strengthening its review process.

In May 2026, CTW Cayman was renamed CTW.

== Platform ==
CTW operates G123 as its primary platform. G123 uses HTML5 technology, enabling browser-based gameplay without requiring downloads or installations. The platform provides free-to-play games across various genres, such as RPG, strategy, and simulation, monetized through optional in-game purchases. By mid-2025, G123 hosted over 25 active titles.

== Selected games ==
- Vivid Army (2019)
- Queen’s Blade Limit Break (2022)
- Black Lagoon: Heaven’s Shot (2023)
- Doraemon: Comic Traveler (2025)
- High School D×D Operation Paradise Infinity (2025)
- Miss Kobayashi's Dragon Maid Fantasia (2025)
