= Naious =

1990 video game

- Cover art by Hiroyuki Saegusa
- Developer: Exact
- Publisher: Exact
- Director: Hiroyuki Saegusa
- Designer: Yukio Watanabe
- Programmer: Kazuki Toyota
- Artist: Toshimitsu Ōdaira
- Composers: Hiroshi Yamamoto; Hiroyuki Saegusa
- Platform: X68000
- Release: JP: October 26, 1990
- Genre: Scrolling shooter
- Mode: Single-player

Naious (Note: Japanese: ナイアス, Hepburn: Naiasu) is a horizontally scrolling shooter video game developed and published by Exact exclusively for the X68000 computer in Japan on October 26, 1990. It is both the first title to be created and released by Exact for the X68000 platform, as well as the first project produced by the company.

Set in a futuristic sci-fi 2143 setting, the players assume the role of fighter pilot Manami Katagiri taking control of the ASP space fighter craft in an effort to stop the titular artificial intelligence that has turned antagonistic against humankind. Although the game was first launched by Exact on retail stores, it would later be distributed through the Takeru software vending machines, which allowed users to write commercial titles or dōjin soft on blank 5.25" floppy disks.

Despite receiving little promotion, Naious became a sleeper hit among the X68000 userbase for Exact during its initial release and received praise for various aspects such as the graphics and gameplay that would eventually lead it to be named "Game of the Year" by Japanese magazine Oh!X in its genre. After its release, Exact would go on to develop their second title for the X68000, Aquales, which was released almost a year later and garnered positive response from critics and audience alike.

== Gameplay ==
Gameplay screenshot

Naious is a horizontally scrolling shooter game reminiscent of Hellfire, Thunder Cross and Whip Rush, where players assume the role of pilot Manami Katagiri taking control of the ASP space fighter craft across seven stages that take place on a futuristic sci-fi setting in a last-ditch effort to stop the titular artificial intelligence that has become rogue against humankind and defeat his army of enemies. Prior to starting, players have access to the configuration menu at the title screen of the game, where various settings can be adjusted.

The players starts with only one weapon at the beginning of the game; a Vulcan shot but the ship can expand its inventory by collecting new weapons scattered on the stage such as a Wide shot and a Laser, while other power-ups appear at certain points during the stages that changes or enhances the arsenal. Players can also equip the ship with a set of two satellite "options", whose positions can be arranged and attack at the player's will. At the end of each stage, a boss must be fought to progress further through the game, with each stage increasing in difficulty. If the ship is hit by enemy fire, the players lose a live as well as both the options and the weapon in use, instead of losing all collected weapons and once all lives are lost, the game is over.

== Synopsis ==
The plotline of Naious takes place between the 21st and 22nd centuries, where the Earth has become overpopulated and uninhabitable due to constant pollution that prompted humankind towards space colonization, which expanded their technological advances as a result. The humans first discovered a series of machines in Mars and scientists spent several years in reverse engineering their technology for beneficial purposes, while habitable spots in a weakened Jupiter are found for temporary colonization and the existence of extraterrestrial life is later confirmed. The technological expansion led to widespread pollution once again and to counter it, a satellite containing the titular artificial intelligence is built by the Earth Federation Bureau for the task of purifying the atmosphere of Earth, but it eventually becomes sentient and ultimately threatens humanity by first obliterating various cities with a powerful blast. Manami Katagiri, pilot of the ASP space fighter craft, is assigned with the mission of stopping the rogue AI in a last-ditch effort.

== Development and release ==
Naious was both the first title to be created and released by Exact for the X68000 platform, as well as the first overall project produced by the company. The game was first previewed across a few magazine such as Oh!X, before being released on October 26, 1990, in stores with a retail price of JP¥8,700. It was later distributed through the Takeru software vending machines, which allowed users of the machine to download commercial or dōjin games by inserting a blank floppy disk.

== Reception ==
Reception

Review scores
Publication	Score
Oh!X	5/7
Technopolis	6/7

Award
Publication	Award
Oh!X (1990)	#1 1990年度Oh!X Game of the Year

Although it received little promotion, Naious became a popular title among users of the X68000 and several aspects such as the graphics and gameplay were praised by critics, which would eventually lead the game on being named "Game of the Year" from Oh!X magazine in its genre.
