= Étoile Princesse =

1993 video game

- Developer(s): Exact
- Publisher(s): Exact
- Producer(s): Yoshiyuki Ikarashi
- Programmer(s): Hiroshi Yamamoto
- Artist(s): Kazuki Toyota
- Writer(s): Toshimitsu Ōdaira
- Composer(s): Hiroyuki Saegusa
- Platform(s): X68000
- Release: JP: 26 March 1993
- Genre(s): Action role-playing, platform, puzzle, run and gun
- Mode(s): Single-player

Étoile Princesse (Note: Japanese: エトワール プリンセス, Hepburn: Etowāru Purinsesu; lit. "Star Princess") is an action role-playing video game developed and published by Exact exclusively for the X68000 in Japan on March 26, 1993. It is the third title to be created and released by Exact for the X68000 platform late into its commercial life span, which was a few months before being discontinued in the same year by Sharp Corporation.

Taking place in the fantasy world of Fail Land, the players take control of young princess Rilule on a journey to rescue the kidnapped female magicians of her country as well as a young man named Sol from their captivity by a dark witch and her demonic followers, who have invaded and terrorized upon the inhabitants of the floating land masses, in order to save her kingdom from peril. Its gameplay mainly consists of action RPG combining exploration, platforming and shoot 'em up elements, with a main two-button configuration.

Despite its late release on the computer, Étoile Princesse proved to be one of the most popular titles from Exact among the X68000 userbase with its colorful graphics, sound design and gameplay that would eventually lead it to being nominated for a "Game of the Year" award by Japanese magazine Oh!X, before ultimately losing against other titles on the system. After its release, Exact would go on to develop their fourth and last title for the X68000, Geograph Seal, which was released a year later to equally positive critical and audience response.

== Gameplay ==
Gameplay screenshot

Étoile Princesse is primarily an action role-playing game with adventure, platform, puzzle and run and gun elements that is played in a top-down perspective reminiscent of KiKi KaiKai, Twinkle Tale and The Legend of Zelda: Link's Awakening, where the players initially take control of the main protagonist Rilule across various stages of varying thematic set in the world of Fail Land where the main objectives are to rescue each of the multiple playable characters that have both their own main weapon and special ability, free Sol from his imprisonment as well as defeating the dark witch, the main antagonist, and her legion of monsters in order to ultimately restore peace to the country.

Most of the levels featured in the game, although linear in nature, are large and populated with obstacles and enemies which involve the players on traversing them by jumping, running and solving puzzles while shooting and dodging enemies that roam around the playfield. The stages also feature multiple buildings and routes to explore, encouraging the player with exploring them in order to find items hidden in treasure chests such as fruit and leaf that restores health and magic respectively, keys, among other beneficial items, while players can also collect other useful items that are randomly dropped by enemies after defeating them.

Rilule and the other playable characters can shoot projectiles and unleash powerful magic spells representative of their ability against enemies and one of the dark witch's creations that act as a boss at the end of the each stage, which must be fought in order to progress further through the game, which is mostly linear as well compared with the stages. After defeating a boss, one of the captured playable characters is rescued and recruited to the party, which up to three can be taken alongside before starting any stage but only one can be used during gameplay, while every character on the currently selected party members shares the same HP and MP meters between each other.

Controlling the characters is done with a directional pad, which moves the player character in eight directions, as well as both an attack and a jump button. Charging a powerful magic spell attack is done by holding the attack button down that depletes MPs. Pressing either both action buttons or the shift key on a keyboard allows access to the inventory screen to choose a character or item. Once a stage is completed, players can save or load their current progress as well as return to the title screen before entering any stage. If the HP meter is completely depleted by enemy attacks, the game is over. Prior to starting a playthrough, players have access to the options menu at the title screen of the game, where various settings can be adjusted.

== Synopsis ==
Étoile Princesse takes place in the fantasy world of Fail Land, a set of floating land masses above the skies where a self-centered and careless young princess named Rilule, who is capable of controlling the power of the stars, resides peacefully in the room of her castle alongside her elder mentor, who enters and warns Rilule about demons that have suddenly appeared all over the country and began terrorizing its inhabitants, as well as sealing female magicians like her in order to minimize powerful opposition against them but believing is not an important matter, she does not care at first until her mentor shows a poster indicating that a young man named Sol was kidnapped by a dark witch, who is responsible for the occurring monster rebellion changes her thought, prompting Rilule to save her people and the kingdom from impending peril.

== Development and release ==
Étoile Princesse was the third title to be developed and published by Exact for the X68000 and it was in development since 1992, with plans to be released on November 27 of the same year and early previews of the game showcasing both a different GUI design during gameplay and character selection screen as well, which were redesigned before its eventual launch in Japan on March 26, 1993, late into the commercial life span of the computer and before being discontinued in the same year by Sharp Corporation with a retail price of JP¥9,800. The game is compatible with multiple X68000 machines, including the X68030 and features support with multiple Roland MIDI sound modules.

== Reception ==
Reception

Review score
Publication	Score
Oh!X	8/10

Award
Publication	Award
Oh!X (1993)	#3 1993年度Oh!X Game of the Year

Étoile Princesse was positively received from audience and critics alike since its release. Nishikawa Zenji from Oh!X magazine praised multiple aspects such as the graphics, sound design and gameplay. Although it was released late during the commercial life span of the platform, the game proved to be a popular one among the X68000 userbase in Japan, which would eventually led it in being nominated for a "Game of the Year" award from Oh!X magazine but lost against other titles such as Akumajō Dracula and Street Fighter II′.
