= List of Apple II games =

This is a list of video games for the Apple II line of computers. There is a separate list of Apple IIGS games.

There are currently 676 games on this list. (Note: This number is always up to date by this script)

Title	Year	Developer	Publisher	Notes
$100,000 Pyramid	1987	Craig Carlson	The Box Office	
221B Baker Street	1986		Datasoft	
2400 A.D.	1987	Chuck Bueche	Origin Systems	Graphical RPG
3 Dimensional Maze	1978		Microtronix	
3 in 1 College & Pro Football	1984	Lance Haffner	Lance Haffner Games	
3-D Docking Mission	1978	Chris Oberth	Programma International/The Elektrik Keyboard	
3-D Skiing	1981		Continental Software	
3-D Space Battle	1980	Paul Berker	Loch Ness Productions	
50 Mission Crush	1984	John Gray	Strategic Simulations	
9-Hole Miniature Golf	1981	Mitch Voth	SoftSide Publications, Inc.	
ABM	1980	Silas Warner	Muse Software	Clone of Missile Command
Accolade's Comics	1987		Accolade	
Acey Ducey	1980	Michael D. Weinstock	SoftSide Publications, Inc.	
Acey-Deucey	1982	Larry Sherman	L&S Computerware	
Ack Ack	1979		Programma International	
Addition Magician	1984	Dale Disharoon	The Learning Company	
Advanced Blackjack	1983		Muse Software	
Adventure	1985	John Rausch		Role-playing game, complete version of Colossal Cave Adventure by William Crowther & Don Woods)
Adventure Construction Set	1985	Stuart Smith	Electronic Arts	Graphical RPG and editor
Adventure Creator	1987		Spinnaker Software	
Adventure in Time	1981	Paul Berker	Phoenix Software	
Adventureland	1978	Scott Adams	Adventure International	Interactive fiction
Adventures in Flesh	1983	Fred D Williams	Krell Software	Adventure game
Adventures in Narnia: Dawn Treader	1984	Lifeware / Gruen Studios	Word Publishing	action/adventure game
Adventures in Narnia: Narnia	1984	Lifeware / Gruen Studios	Word Publishing	action/adventure game
The Adventures of Buckaroo Banzai: Across the Eighth Dimension	1984	Scott Adams	Adventure International	
A.E.	1982	Programmers-3 (Makato Horai & Jun Wada)	Broderbund	Fixed shooter
Agent USA	1984	Tom Snyder Productions	Scholastic	
Air Flight Simulation	1979		Instant Software	
Aircraft Instrument Simulator	1979		Soft-One	
Air Traffic Controller	1979		Creative Computing	
Airheart	1986	Dan Gorlin Productions	Broderbund	
Akalabeth	1980	Richard Garriott	California Pacific Computer Company	Graphical RPG
ALF: The First Adventure	1987		Box Office	
Ali Baba and the Forty Thieves	1982	Stuart Smith	Quality Software	
Alcazar: The Forgotten Fortress	1985	Activision	Activision	
Alibi	1981	Ian L. Trackman	Hayden Book Company	
Alice in Wonderland	1985		Windham Classics	
The Alien	1982		Avalon Hill	
Alien Downpour	2017	Michael Packard	Snacking On! Software	Arcade shooter
Alien Encounters	1979	Ferdinand Metz & John F. Mahin	Programma International	
Alien Lander	1980	Alick Dziabczenko	Sierra Software	
Alien Rain	1981	Tony Suzuki	Broderbund	Arcade shooter
Alien Typhoon	1981	Tony Suzuki	StarCraft, Inc. & Brøderbund Software, Inc.	
Aliens: The Computer Game	1986	Robert Friele & Michael Ornsby	Activision	Action/adventure game
Alkemstone	1981			Level-10
Alpine Encounter	1985	ibidinc Games	Random House	
Alter Ego	1986	Peter J. Favaro	Activision	RPG
Alternate Reality: The City	1985	Paradise Programming	Datasoft	3D RPG
Alternate Reality: The Dungeon	1987	Paradise Programming	Datasoft	3D RPG
Amazon	1984	Michael Crichton	Telarium	Graphic adventure game
American Challenge: A Sailing Simulation	1986		Mindscape	
Amnesia	1986	Cognetics Corporation	Electronic Arts	Interactive fiction
The Ancient Art of War	1984	Evryware	Broderbund	War strategy game
The Ancient Art of War at Sea	1987	War strategy game	Broderbund	
Android Nim	1980		Adventure International	
Andromeda Conquest	1982		Avalon Hill	
Anti-Gravity	1984	Michael Katz & Tom Johnson	shareware	
APBA Major League Players Baseball	1986		Random House	
Ape Escape	1982	Kevin Bagley	SAMS	
Apple Adventure	1980	Peter Schmuckal & Leonard Barshack	Apple Computer	adapted from Colossal Cave Adventure (William Crowther and Don Woods)
Apple Cider Spider	1983	Ivan Strand	Sierra On-Line	
Apple Panic	1981	Ben Serki	Broderbund	
Apple Trek	1979	Wendell Sander	Apple Computer	
Apple-Oids	1980		California Pacific	
Apventure to Atlantis	1982	Robert C. Clardy	Synergistic Software	
Aquatron	1983	Justin Gray	Sierra On-Line	
Arac (Spiderbot)	1986		Addictive Games	
Arcade Boot Camp	1984	John Besnard	Penguin Software	
The Arcade Machine	1982	Doug Carlston & Chris Jochumson	Broderbund	
Archon	1983	Free Fall Associates	Electronic Arts	action/strategy game
Archon II: Adept	1984	Free Fall Associates	Electronic Arts	action/strategy game
Arcticfox	1986	Dynamix	Electronic Arts	Arcade game, Tank simulation
Ardy the Aardvark	1983	Chris Oberth	Datamost	
Arena of Octos	1981	Steve Kropinak	SoftSide	
Arkanoid	1988		Taito	Arcade shooter
Arthur: The Quest for Excalibur	1989		Infocom	
The Asteroid Field	1980	Jim Nitchals	Cavalier Computer	
Astro-Grover	1984	Children's Computer Workshop	CBS Software	
At the Gates of Moscow 1941	1985		Strategic Games Publications	
Australian Cockroach	1988	Bryan Vekovius and Jim Weiler	Softdisk	
Autoduel	1985	Richard Garriott & Chuck Bueche	Origin Systems	Role-playing game
Axis Assassin	1983		Electronic Arts	
Aztec	1982	Paul Stephenson	Datamost	
Bad Dudes	1988	Quicksilver Software	Data East	
B-1 Nuclear Bomber	1980		Avalon Hill	
Balance of Power	1985	Chris Crawford	Mindscape	
Ballblazer	1985	Lucasfilm Games, K-Byte	Epyx	
Ballyhoo	1985	Jeff O'Neill	Infocom	
Baltic 1985: Corridor to Berlin	1984		Strategic Simulations	
Bandits	1982	Tony Ngo and Benny Ngo	Sirius Software	
Baratin Blues	1986	Froggy Software		
The Bard's Tale	1985	Interplay Productions (Michael Cranford)	Electronic Arts	RPG
The Bard's Tale II: The Destiny Knight	1986	Interplay Productions (Michael Cranford)	Electronic Arts	RPG
The Bard's Tale III: Thief of Fate	1988	Interplay Productions (Rebecca Heineman, Bruce Schlickbernd, and Michael A. Stackpole)	Electronic Arts	RPG
Baron: The Real Estate Simulation	1983		Blue Chip Software	Business simulation
Baseball Fanatic	1986	Performing Arts Software	Performing Arts Software	
Bats in the Belfry	1983	Samuel Moore	Phoenix Software	
Battle Chess	1990	Interplay	Interplay	Chess simulation
Battlefront	1986		Strategic Studies Group	
Battle of Antietam	1985	Strategic Simulations	Strategic Simulations	
The Battle of Shiloh	1985	Tactical Design Group	Strategic Simulations	
BattleTech: The Crescent Hawk's Inception	1989		Infocom	
Battlezone	1984	Quality Software (James Albanese)	Atarisoft	Arcade game
B.C.'s Quest for Tires	1983	Sydney Development	Sierra On-Line	
Beach Head	1983	Access Software	U.S. Gold	Arcade game
Beach Head II	1988	Peter Adams	Access Software	Arcade game
Beagle Bag	1982	Beagle Bros	Beagle Bros	
Beast War	1985		Avalon Hill	Action-strategy game
Bee Crunch			Keypunch Software	
Beer Run	1981	Mark Turmell	Sirius Software	
Below the Root	1984	Dale DeSharone	Windham Classics	
Beneath Apple Manor	1978	Don Worth	The Software Factory	
Berserker Raids	1983	Berserker Works	Baen Software	Turn-based strategy
Beyond Castle Wolfenstein	1984	Silas Warner	Muse Software	Stealth game
Beyond Zork	1987	Brian Moriarty	Infocom	Text-based (mostly) RPG
Bez-MX	1981	John Besnard	Bez	Nuclear strategy game
Bezman	1981	John Besnard	Bez	Pac-Man clone
Bezoff	1982	John Besnard	Bez	
Bez Wars	1981	John Besnard	Bez	
The Bilestoad	1982	Marc Goodman (as "Mangrove Earthshoe")	Datamost	
Birth of the Phoenix	1981	Paul Berker	Phoenix Software	
Black Belt	1984		Earthware Computer Services	
The Black Cauldron	1986		Sierra On-Line	
Black Magic	1987	Peter Ward	Datasoft	
Blade of Blackpoole	1982	Tim Wilson	Sirius Software	
Blister Ball	1981	Rodney McAuley	Creative Computing Software	
Blitzkrieg	1979	Mark Cross	Programma International	
Bloody Murder	1979	Arthur Wells	Stoneware	
Blue Powder Grey Smoke	1986		Gardé Games of Distinction	
Bolo	1982	James Lane	Synergistic Software	
Bomber	1978	Bob Bishop	Softape	Arcade game
Bongo's Bash	1985	John Romero	inCider Magazine	Maze game
Bop-A-Bet	1982	SunnySide Soft	Sunnyside Soft, Sierra On-Line	
Border Zone	1987		Infocom	
Borg	1981	Dan Thompson	Sirius Software	
Borrowed Time	1985	Interplay	Activision	
Boulder Dash	1984	First Star Software (Pat Montelo)	Electronic Arts	Action
Bouncing Kamungas	1983	Tom Becklund	Penguin Software	
Breakers	1986		Broderbund	
Breakout	1977	Steve Wozniak	Apple Computer	Arcade game, Precursor to Little Brick Out
Breakthrough in the Ardennes	1984	Tactical Design Group	Strategic Simulations	
Broadsides	1983	Strategic Simulations	Strategic Simulations	
Bronze Dragon: Conquest of Infinity	1985		Commonwealth Software	
Bruce Lee	1984	Rick Mirsky	Datasoft	
Bubble Bobble	1988	NovaLogic	Taito	
Buck Rogers: Planet of Zoom	1982	Ken Jordan	Sega	Arcade game, flight
Bug Attack	1981	Jim Nitchals	Cavalier Computer	Arcade
Bureaucracy	1987	Douglas Adams	Infocom	Interactive fiction
BurgerTime	1983	Mattel Electronics	Mattel Electronics	A home port of the arcade game of the same name developed under license from Data East USA
Buzzard Bait	1983	Mike Ryeburn	Sirius Software	
California Games	1987	Epyx	Epyx	A collection of California-themed sports games, such as half-pipe skateboarding and surfing
Cannonball Blitz	1982	Olaf Lubeck	Sierra On-Line	Donkey Kong clone
Canyon Climber	1982	Brian Mountford	Datasoft	Platform game
Captain Goodnight and the Islands of Fear	1985	Michael Wise	Broderbund	
Castle Dain	2023	Frank Rossi	homebrew	mini-RPG
Castle Smurfenstein	1983	Andrew Johnson & Preston Nevins	Dead Smurf Software	parody hack of Castle Wolfenstein
Castle Wolfenstein	1981	Silas Warner	Muse Software	Stealth game
Catacomb	1989	John Carmack	Softdisk	
Cavern Creatures	1983	Paul Lowrance	Datamost	
Caverns of Callisto	1983	Chuck Bueche	Origin Systems	
The Caverns of Freitag	1981	David Shapiro (as "Dr. Cat")	Muse Software	
Caves of Olympus	1982	Thomas Noone & Patrick Noone	SAMS	
Ceiling Zero	1981	RAM Software	Turnkey Software	Shoot em up
Centauri Alliance	1990	Michael Cranford	Broderbund	RPG
Centipede	1983		Atarisoft	
Championship Baseball	1987		Gamestar	
Championship Golf	1982		Hayden Software	
Championship Lode Runner	1983	Douglas E. Smith	Broderbund	
Championship Wrestling	1986		Epyx	
Chennault's Flying Tigers	1981		Discovery Games	
Chess 7.0	1982		Odesta	Chess
Chessmaster 2000	1986	Mark Manyen	The Software Toolworks	Chess
ChipWits	1985		BrainPower	
Chivalry	1983	Richard Hefter, Steve Worthington, & Janie Worthington	Optimum Resource	Action/RPG
Choplifter	1982	Dan Gorlin	Broderbund	Action
Chuck Yeager's Advanced Flight Trainer	1987	Lerner Research	Electronic Arts	
Clue: Master Detective	1989		Virgin Mastertronic	
Colossus Chess 4	1986		CDS Software	
Commando	1987	Quicksilver Software	Data East	
Competition Karate	1984		Motivated Software	
Compu-Spell	1980	Edu-Ware	Edu-Ware	
Computer Baseball	1987	Strategic Simulations	Strategic Simulations	Sports game
The Computer Edition of Risk: The World Conquest Game	1989		Leisure Genius	
The Computer Edition of Scrabble	1989		Leisure Genius	
Computer Quarterback	1981	Strategic Simulations	Strategic Simulations	Sports game
Conan: Hall of Volta	1984	SE Software (Eric Robinson & Eric Parker)	Datasoft	
Congo	1982	Sentient Software (Michael Berlyn & Harry Walker)	Sogiciel	
Congo Bongo	1983	Sega	Sega	Arcade
Conquering Worlds	1983		Datamost	
Copts and Robbers	1983	Alan Merell & Eric Knopp	Sirius Software	
Corruption	1988		Rainbird Software	
Cosmos Mission	1979		Astar International Inc.	Space Invaders clone
The Count	1981	Scott Adams	Adventure International	
Countdown to Shutdown	1985	T.L. Gale & Ivan Manley	Activision	
The Coveted Mirror	1983	Eagle Berns and Holly Thomason	Penguin Software	
Cranston Manor	1981	Ken Williams and Harold DeWitz	On-Line Systems	Also known as Hi-Res Adventure #3
Crazy Mazey	1982	Datamost	Datamost	
Creature Venture	1980		Highlands Computer Services	
Crickety Manor	1988	Pat Relf & Tara Framer	Scholastic	On Microzine Jr. issue #2
Crisis Mountain	1982	David Schroeder	Synergistic Software	
Crosscountry Canada	1986	Dave Vincent	Didatech	
Crosscountry USA	1985	Dave Vincent	Didatech	
Crossfire	1981	Jay Sullivan	Sierra On-Line	
Crush, Crumble and Chomp!	1981	Michael Farren	Epyx	
Crypt of Medea	1984	Arthur Britto & Allan Lamb	Sir-Tech	
Crystal Castles	1983		Atarisoft	
Curse of the Azure Bonds	1989	Strategic Simulations	Strategic Simulations	RPG
Curse of Crowley Manor	1981	Adventure International	Adventure International	
Cyber Strike	1980	Nasir Gebelli	Sirius Software	
Cyclod	1981	Hunter Hancock	Sirius Software	
The Dallas Quest	1984		Datasoft	
Dam Busters	1984	Sydney Development	Accolade	
Dangerous Dave	1988	John Romero	UpTime	Platform game
Dark Crystal	1983	Sierra On-Line	SierraVenture	
Dark Forest	1981	Tom Mornini	Sirius Software	
Darkhorn: Realm of the Warlords	1985	Thomas G. Cleaver	Avalon Hill	
Dark Tower	1984	Melbourne House	Melbourne House	
Dart Room	1979	The Elektrik Keyboard	Chris Oberth	
David's Midnight Magic	1982	David Snider	Broderbund	Pinball
Dawn Patrol	1982	Keith Enge	TSR	
Deadline	1982	Marc Blank	Infocom	Interactive fiction
Death in the Caribbean	1983	Philip Hess & Bob Hess	Micro Fun	A graphic adventure game
Death Race	1979	Bob Andrews	Programma International	
Death Race '82	1982	Don Fudge	Avant-Garde Creations	
Death Sword	1987	Designer Software (Jimmy Huey)	Epyx	
Deathlord	1987	Electronic Arts	Electronic Arts	RPG
Deathmaze 5000	1980	Frank Corr and William Denman	Med Systems Software	
Defender	1983	Williams Electronics	Atarisoft	
Delta Squadron	1983	Nexa	Nexa	
The Demon's Forge	1981		Saber Software	
Demon's Winter	1988	Strategic Simulations	Strategic Simulations	RPG
Depth Charge	1978	Chris Oberth	The Elektrik Keyboard	
Designasaurus	1988	DesignWare	Britannica Software	
Diamond Mine	1983	IDSI	Roklan	
Dig Dug	1982	Atari, Inc.	Atarisoft	Arcade
Dino Eggs	1983	David Schroeder	Micro Fun	
Dino Smurf	1983	Andrew Johnson & Preston Nevins	Dead Smurf Software	parody hack of Dino Eggs
Dogfight	1980	Bill Basham	Microlab	
Donald Duck's Playground	1985		Sierra On-Line	
Donald's Alphabet Chase	1988	Westwood Associates	Disney Software	
Dondra	1987	Spectrum Holobyte	Spectrum Holobyte	
Donkey Kong	1984	Michael Cranford	Atarisoft	
Doom Cavern	1980	Morwe	Synergistic Software	RPG; included with the game Sorcerer's Challenge on the same disk.
Dragon Fire	1981	Level-10	Level-10	
Dragon Wars	1989	Interplay	Interplay	
Dragon's Eye	1981		Automated Simulations	
Dragonworld	1984		Trillium	
Drelbs	1984		Synapse Software	
Drol	1983	Aik Beng	Broderbund	
Dung Beetles	1982	Bob Bishop	Datasoft	
Dungeon!	1982	Bruce Nesmith & Keith Enge	TSR	
Dungeon Campaign	1978	Robert C. Clardy	Synergistic Software	
Dunzhin	1982		Screenplay	
Dynasty	1978	Weyman Fong	Apple Core	
Eamon	1980	Donald Brown	public domain	
Earl Weaver Baseball	1989	Mirage Graphics	Electronic Arts	
Earth Orbit Stations	1987	Karl Buiter	Electronic Arts	
Earthly Delights	1983	Roger Webster and Dan Leviton	Datamost	
Electrifying Adventures	1983	Unknown	MECC	
Elite	1985	David Braben and Ian Bell	Firebird	
Empire: Wargame of the Century	1987	Northwest Software	Interstel	
Empire I: World Builders	1981	Edu-ware Services	Interactive Fantasies	
Empire II: Interstellar Sharks	1982	Edu-ware Services	Interactive Fantasies	
Empire III: Armageddon	1983	Edu-ware Services	Interactive Fantasies	
Epoch	1981	Larry Miller	Sirius Software	
Escape!	1978	Silas Warner	Muse Software	Also rereleased in 1980 on The Best of Muse compilation disk.
Escape from ANTcatraz	1987	Lorri Hopping	Scholastic Corporation	On Microzine issue #23
Escape from Arcturus	1981	Synergistic Software	Synergistic Software	
Escape from Rungistan	1982	Bob Bluaschild	Sirius Software	
ET Comes Back	1984		Alliance Software	
Evolution	1982	Jeff Sember & Don Mattrick	Sydney Development	
Expedition Amazon	1983	Willard Phillips	Penguin Software	
Exterminator				
EZ Logo	1983		MECC	
F-15 Strike Eagle	1985	MicroProse	MicroProse	
Falcons	1981	Thomas Ball (computer scientist), Eric Varsanyi	Piccadilly Software	
Fat City	1983	Optimum Resource (Richard Hefter, Steve Worthington)	Weekly Reader Family Software	First-person action game
The Fidelity Chessmaster 2100	1988	The Software Toolworks	The Software Toolworks	
Fight Night	1985	Sydney Development	Accolade	
Firebug	1982	Silas Warner	Muse Software	
First Encounter	1987	John Besnard	Softdisk	
The Fleet Street Phantom	1987	Simon Hosler and Bill Bonham	Sherston Software	
Flight Simulator	1979	Bruce Artwick	Sublogic	Also known as A2-FS1 Flight Simulator
Flight Simulator II	1983	Bruce Artwick	Sublogic	
Fooblitzky	1985	Marc Blank, Michael Berlyn, Poh C. Lim, & Paula Maxwell	Infocom	
Fracas	1980	Quality Software	Computersmiths	
Fraction Munchers	1987		MECC	
Fraktured Faebles	1985	Phoenix Software	Dale Johnson and Rick Incrocci	
Freedom!	1992	MECC	MECC	
Frogger	1983	Olaf Lubeck	Sierra On-Line	
Frogger II: ThreeeDeep!	1984		Sega	
G.I. Joe: A Real American Hero	1985	Epyx	Epyx	
Galactic Empire	1980	Doug Carlston	Broderbund	Strategy game
Galaxian	1983		Atarisoft	
Gamma Goblins	1981	Sirius Software	Sirius Software	Arcade
Gato	1985	Spectrum Holobyte	Spectrum Holobyte	
Gauntlet	1985	Atari	Mindscape	
Gemstone Healer	1986	Paradigm Creators	Strategic Simulations	
Gemstone Warrior	1984	Paradigm Creators	Strategic Simulations	
Gertrude's Secrets	1984	The Learning Company	The Learning Company	
Ghostbusters	1984	Activision	Activision	
Global War	1979	Alan M. Boyd	Muse Software	
Gobbler	1981	Olaf Lubeck	On-Line Systems	
Gold Rush!	1988	Sierra On-Line	Sierra On-Line	
Golden Flutes and Great Escapes	1984	Delton T. Horn	Dilithium Press	book and software
Golf's Best: St. Andrews - The Home of Golf	1986	Robert Jenks & Nathan Tennises	1 Step Software	Golf simulator
The Goonies	1985	Scott Spanburg	Datasoft	Arcade game
Gorgon	1981	Sirius Software	Sirius Software	
Grammar Gremlins	1987		Davidson & Associates	
The Great American Cross-Country Road Race	1985	Ivan Manley	Activision	
Gremlins	1984	Atari	Atarisoft	
Gruds in Space	1983	Sirius Software	Sirius Software	
Guerrilla War	1987	Quicksilver Software	Data East	
Hacker	1985	Activision	Activision	
Hacker II: The Doomsday Papers	1986	Activision	Activision	
Hadron	1981	Sirius Software	Sirius Software	
Halley Project	1985	Tom Snyder & Omar Khudari	Mindscape	
Hammurabi	1978	Mark Cross	Apple Computer	appears on Apple Software Bank Contributed Programs Volume 1
Hard Hat Mack	1983	Michael Abbot and Matthew Alexander	Electronic Arts	
HardBall!	1986	Accolade	Accolade	
Heavy Barrel	1989	Quicksilver Software	Data East	
The Heist	1983	Mike Livesay and Mike Mooney	Micro Fun	
Hellfire Warrior	1980	Automated Simulations	Automated Simulations	
Hera	1987	Jeff Hendrix	shareware	RPG
H.E.R.O.	1984	Microsmiths	Activision	
Hi-Res Computer Golf	1981	Avant-Garde	Avant-Garde	
Hi-Res Computer Golf 2	1983	Avant-Garde	Avant-Garde	
High Rise	1983	Joe Calabrese	Micro Learn	
The Hitchhiker's Guide to the Galaxy	1984	Douglas Adams & Steve Meretzky	Infocom	
The Hobbit: A Software Adventure	1982	Beam Software	Addison-Wesley	
House of Seven Gables	1978	Greg Hassett	Mad Hatter Software	text adventure; also appears on the Adventure Disk "A" compilation disk.
The Hunt for Red October	1987	Oxford Digital Enterprises	Argus Press Software	
Impossible Mission	1986	Peter Filiberti	Epyx	
Impossible Mission II	1988	Novotrade Software	Epyx	
In Search of the Most Amazing Thing	1983	Tom Snyder Productions	Spinnaker Software	
Indoor Sports	1987	SportTime/Designware Consultants	Mindscape	
Infiltrator	1986	Chris Gray Enterprises	Mindscape	
Infiltrator II	1987	Chris Gray Enterprises	Mindscape	
Intellectual Decathlon	1984	Gabor Laufer & Alexander Laufer	Muse Software	
Intrigue!	1986	Kinemation	Spectrum Holobyte	
James Bond 007: Goldfinger	1986	Angelsoft	Mindscape	
James Bond 007: A View to a Kill	1985	Angelsoft	Mindscape	
James Clavell's Shōgun	1988	Dave Lebling	Infocom	
Jawbreaker	1981	Olaf Lubeck	On-Line Systems	
Jawbreaker II	1982	Chuck Bueche	On-Line Systems	
Jenny's Journeys	1984	MECC	MECC	
Jeopardy!	1987	Sharedata	Sharedata	
Jet	1986	Sublogic	Sublogic	
Jinxter	1987	Magnetic Scrolls	Rainbird Software	
John Elway's Quarterback	1987	Leland Corporation	Virgin Games	
John Madden Football	1988	Electronic Arts	Electronic Arts	
Journey	1989	Infocom	Infocom	
Journey to the Center of the Earth	1978	Greg Hassett	Mad Hatter Software	text adventure; also appears on the Adventure Disk "A" compilation disk.
Jumpman	1983	Epyx	Epyx	
Jungle Hunt	1984	Ivan Manley	Atarisoft	
Kabul Spy	1982	Sirius Software	Sirius Software	
Kampfgruppe	1985	Strategic Simulations	Strategic Simulations	
Karate Champ	1985	Berkeley Softworks	Data East	
Karateka	1984	Jordan Mechner	Broderbund	
Kaves of Karkhan	1981	Level-10	Level-10	
Kid Niki: Radical Ninja	1987	Quicksilver Software	Data East	
Killed Until Dead	1987	Artech	Accolade	
King Tut's Tomb	1978	Greg Hassett	Mad Hatter Software	text adventure; also appears on the Adventure Disk "A" compilation disk.
King's Bounty	1990	New World Computing	New World Computing	
King's Quest I	1984	Sierra On-Line	IBM, Sierra On-Line	
Knights of the Desert	1983	Tactical Design Group	Strategic Simulations	
Knights of Legend	1989	Origin Systems	Origin Systems	
Koronis Rift	1985	Lucasfilm Games	Lucasfilm Games	
Kung-Fu Master	1985	Berkeley Softworks	Data East	
La Bête du Gévaudan	1985	Compagnie Informatique Ludique	Compagnie Informatique Ludique	
LA Crackdown	1988	Nexa	Epyx	
Labyrinth	1982	Broderbund	Broderbund	
Labyrinth: The Computer Game	1986	Lucasfilm	Activision	
Labyrinth of Crete	1982	Cliff Johnson	Adventure International	
Lady Tut	1984	Spinnaker	Programme	
Laf Pak	1982	Chuck Bueche	Sierra On-Line	
Laser Chess	1987	Mike Duppong	COMPUTE! Publications, Inc.	
The Last Ninja	1988	System 3, Eclipse Software Design	Activision	
Law of the West	1985	Accolade	Accolade	
Leather Goddesses of Phobos	1986	Steve Meretzky	Infocom	
Legacy of the Ancients	1987	Quest Software	Electronic Arts	
Legend of Blacksilver	1988	Quest Software	Epyx	
Leisure Suit Larry in the Land of the Lounge Lizards	1987	Sierra On-Line	Sierra On-Line	Adventure
Lemonade Stand	1979	MECC	Apple Computer	
Little Brick Out	1979	Bruce Tognazzini	Apple Computer	An abbreviated Applesoft version of Steve Wozniak's Integer BASIC Breakout game.
Lode Runner	1983	Douglas E. Smith	Broderbund	
Lords of Conquest	1986	Eon Software	Electronic Arts	
Lords of Karma	1981	Microcomputer Games	Avalon Hill	
Lunar Leepers	1982	Syndein Systems	Sierra On-Line	
The Lurking Horror	1987	Dave Lebling	Infocom	
Mabel's Mansion	1984	Kevin Bagley	Datamost	
Magic Candle	1989	Mindcraft	Mindcraft	
Maniac Mansion	1987	Lucasfilm Games	Lucasfilm Games	
Marauder	1982	Rorke Weigandt and Eric Hammond	On-Line Systems	Two-phase space/ground shooter
Marble Madness	1986	Will Harvey	Electronic Arts	
Mars Cars	1982	Datamost	Datamost	
The Mask of the Sun	1982	Ultrasoft	Broderbund	
Masquerade	1983	Dale Johnson & Rick Incrocci	Phoenix Software	
Math Jam	1985	JAM Software	JAM Software	
Matterhorn Screamer	1988	Walt Disney Computer Software	Hi-Tech Expressions	
Maze Game	1978	Silas Warner	Muse Software	Also rereleased in 1980 on The Best of Muse compilation disk.
Micro Habit	1984			
Microsoft Adventure	1979	Softwin Associates (Gordon Letwin)	Microsoft	Port of Colossal Cave Adventure (William Crowther and Don Woods)
Microwave	1982	Jay Zimmerman & Jim Nitchals	Cavalier Computer	
Might and Magic	1986	New World Computing	New World Computing	
Might and Magic II	1988	New World Computing	New World Computing	
Mind Forever Voyaging, A	1985	Steve Meretzky	Infocom	Interactive fiction
Mindshadow	1984	Interplay Productions	Activision	
Mindwheel	1984	Synapse Software	Broderbund	
Miner 2049er	1982	Mike Livesay	Micro Fun	
Miner's Cave	1988	Intentional Educations	MECC	
Mines of Titan	1989	Westwood Associates	Infocom	
Mission Asteroid	1980	Roberta Williams & Ken Williams	On-Line Systems	Also known as Hi-Res Adventure #0
The Mist	1985	Angelsoft	Mindscape	
Moebius: The Orb of Celestial Harmony	1985	Origin Systems	Broderbund	
Money Munchers	1982	Bob Bishop	Datamost	
Montezuma's Revenge	1983	BCI Software	Parker Brothers	
Moon Patrol	1983	TMQ Software	Atarisoft	
Morloc's Tower	1979	Automated Simulations	Automated Simulations	
Mr. Do!	1985	Rick Mirsky	Datasoft	
Mr. Robot and His Robot Factory	1983	Robert McNally	Datamost	
Ms. Pac-Man	1983	Atari	Atarisoft	
Muppets on Stage	1986	Mike Fish, Anders McCarthy, Jon Sweedler, & Melissa Verber	Sunburst Communications	
Murphy's Minerals	1990	MECC	MECC	
Mystery Fun House	1981	Scott Adams	Adventure International	
Mystery House	1980	Roberta Williams & Ken Williams	On-Line Systems	Also known as Hi-Res Adventure #1
Neptune	1987	Nasir Gebelli	Gebelli Software	
Network	1980	David Mullich	Edu-Ware	Business simulation
Neuromancer	1988	Interplay Productions	Mediagenic	
Night Driver	1980	Bill Budge	California Pacific Computer Company	Part of Bill Budge's Trilogy of Games
Night Mission Pinball	1982	Bruce Artwick	SubLOGIC	
Nightmare #6	1978	Gary Shannon	Apple Computer	appears on Apple Software Bank Contributed Programs Vol. 1
Nightmare Gallery	1982	Ron Aldrich	Synergistic Software	
Nox Archaist	2020	6502 Workshop (Megan Lemmert)	6502 Workshop	RPG
Number Crunch	1982	Greg Carbonaro	Unique	
Number Munchers	1990	MECC	MECC	
Odell Lake	1986	MECC	MECC	
Odell Woods				
Odyssey: The Compleat Apventure	1980	Robert C. Clardy	Synergistic Software	
Ogre	1986	Steve Meuse	Origin Systems	
Oil Barons	1983	Epyx	Epyx	
Olympic Decathlon	1981	Timothy W. Smith	Microsoft	also known as Microsoft Olympic Decathlon
One on One: Dr. J vs. Larry Bird	1983	Electronic Arts	Electronic Arts	
The Oregon Trail	1985	MECC	MECC	
Pac-Man	1983	Atari	Atarisoft	Arcade
Paragon	1988	Softdisk	Softdisk	
Pensate	1983	John Besnard	Penguin Software	
Pentapus	1983	Jeremy Sagan	Turning Point Software	
People Pong	1982	Greg Carbonaro	Unique	
Perception	1979	Edu-Ware	Edu-Ware	
Pest Patrol	1982	Mark Allen	Sierra On-Line	
Phantasie	1985	Strategic Simulations	Strategic Simulations	
Phantasie II	1986	Strategic Simulations	Strategic Simulations	
Phantasie III: The Wrath of Nikademus	1987	Strategic Simulations	Strategic Simulations	
Phantoms Five	1980	Nasir Gebelli	Sirius Software	
Pharaoh's Revenge	1988	Ivan Manley	Publishing International	
Pick-A-Dilly	1983	Norm Gray	Actioncraft	
Pigpen	1982	TMQ Software	Datamost	
Pillbox	1982	Douglas E. Wolfgram	Lord of the Games	Battlezone clone
Pinball Construction Set	1983	Bill Budge	Electronic Arts	
Pirate Adventure	1978	Scott Adams	Adventure International	
Pitfall II: Lost Caverns	1984	Microsmiths (Rex E. Bradford)	Activision	
Pitstop II	1984	Ivan Manley	Epyx	
Planetfall	1983	Steve Meretzky	Infocom	
Pleins Gaz	1986	Richard Soberka	Froggy Software	
Police Artist	1983	Elizabeth Levin	Sir-Tech	
Police Quest: In Pursuit of the Death Angel	1987	Jim Walls	Sierra On-Line	
Pool of Radiance	1988	Strategic Simulations	Strategic Simulations	RPG
Pooyan	1984	Datasoft	Datasoft	
Portal	1986	Nexa	Activision	
President Elect	1981	Nelson G. Hernandez	Strategic Simulations	
Prince of Persia	1989	Jordan Mechner	Broderbund	
The Prisoner	1980	Edu-Ware	Edu-Ware	
Prisoner 2	1982	Edu-Ware	Edu-Ware	
Pro Golf I	1985	Micro Imagery	Hesware	
Project Space Station	1987	Micro Imagery	Hesware	
Pyramids of Egypt	1987	John Romero	UpTime	Maze game
Pyromania				
Quasar	1983	Jonathan Dubman	Aristotle Software	
The Queen of Phobos	1982	Paul Berker & Bill Crawford	Phoenix Software	
The Quest	1983	Dallas Snell	Penguin Software	
Questprobe	1985	Adventure International	Adventure International	
Raft Away River	1984	Gerald M. Wluka	Jacaranda Wiley LTD	
Raid over Moscow	1985	Access Software	Access Software	
Raiders of the Lost Ring (a.k.a. Ring Raiders)	1983	Jim Nitchals	Cavalier Computer	
Raster Blaster	1981	Bill Budge	BudgeCo	
Reach for the Stars	1985	Strategic Simulations	Strategic Simulations Group	Strategy game
Read n' Roll	1988		Davidson & Associates	
Reader Rabbit	1984	The Learning Company	The Learning Company	Edutainment
Rear Guard	1982	Adventure International	Adventure International	
Red Alert	1981	Olaf Lubeck	Broderbund Software	
Reforger '88	1984	Strategic Simulations	Strategic Simulations	
Renegade	1989	NovaLogic	Taito	
Repton	1983	Sirius Software	Sirius Software	
Rescue at Rigel	1980	Epyx	Epyx	
Rescue on Fractalus!	1985	THQ Software	Epyx	
Rescue Raiders	1983	Arthur Britto & Greg Hale	Sir-Tech	
Return of Heracles	1983	Stuart Smith	Quality Software	
Ring Quest	1983	Dallas Snell	Penguin Software	Sequel to The Quest
Roach Hotel	1981	Mike Livesay	Microlab	
Roadwar 2000	1986	Jeffrey Johnson	Strategic Simulations	
Roadwar Europa	1987	Jeffrey Johnson	Strategic Simulations	
RoboCop	1988	Quicksilver Software	Data East	
Robot Odyssey	1984	Mike Wallace & Dr. Leslie Grimm	The Learning Company	
Robotron: 2084	1983	TMQ Software	Atarisoft	
RobotWar	1981	Silas Warner	Muse Software	
Rocky's Boots	1982	Warren Robinett & Dr. Leslie Grimm	The Learning Company	
Round About	1983	Gumby Bitworks (Ray Giarratana)	Datamost	
Russki Duck	1982	Allen Merrell & Eric Knopp	Gebelli Software	
Sabotage	1981	Mark Allen	On-Line Systems	
Sammy Lightfoot	1983	Warren Schwader	Sierra On-Line	
Sands of Mars	1981	John Bell & Patty Bell	Crystal Computer	
Santa Paravia en Fiumaccio	1979	George Blank	Instant Software	
Saracen	1987	IntelliCreations	Datasoft	
Sargon	1979	Dan and Kathleen Spracklen	Hayden Software	
Sargon II	1982	Dan and Kathleen Spracklen	Hayden Software	
Sea Dragon	1982	John Anderson	Adventure International	
Secret Agent: Mission One	1983	Jorge Davies & Andrew Golder	Jor-And	
Serpentine	1982	David Snider	Broderbund	
The Seven Cities of Gold	1984	Ozark Software	Electronic Arts	
Shamus	1983	Synapse Software	Synapse Software	
Shard of Spring	1986	Craig Roth and David Stark	Strategic Simulations	
Sherlock Holmes: Another Bow	1985	Imagic	Bantam Software	
Sherwood Forest	1982	Dale Johnson and Dav Holle	Phoenix Software	
Short Circuit	1985	David Schroeder	Micro Fun	
Sid Meier's Pirates!	1987	MicroProse Software	MicroProse Software	
Silent Service	1985	MicroProse Software	MicroProse Software	
Silvern Castle	1988	Jeff Fink	Softdisk (unreleased)	RPG; released by author in 1999.
Situation Critical	1984	Alex Stern, Peter Rokitski, & Greg George	Prism Software	
Ski crazed	1987	JAM Software	Baudville	
Skyfox	1984	Ray Tobey	Electronic Arts	
Snack Attack	1982	Funtastic (Dan Illowsky)	Datamost	
Snake Byte	1982	Chuck Summerville	Sirius Software	
Sneakers	1981	Mark Turmell	Sirius Software	
Snooper Troops: Case #1 - The Granite Point Ghost	1982	Tom Snyder	Spinnaker Software	
Snooper Troops: Case #2 - The Case of the Disappearing Dolphin	1982	Tom Snyder	Spinnaker Software	
Snoopy to the Rescue	1984	Random House	Random House	
Softporn Adventure	1981	Chuck Benton	On-Line Systems	Text adventure
Sokoban	1984	Thinking Rabbit	Thinking Rabbit	
Sorcerer's Castle	1978	Greg Hassett	Mad Hatter Software	text adventure; also appears on the Adventure Disk "A" compilation disk.
Sorcerer's Challenge	1980	Robert C. Clardy	Synergistic Software	Included with the game Doom Cavern on the same disk.
Southern Command	1981	Strategic Simulations	Strategic Simulations	
Space	1978	Steven Pederson	Edu-Ware	
Space II	1979	David Mullich	Edu-Ware	
Space Defender	1982	Daniel Schuyler	Bel-Air Software	
Space Eggs	1981	Nasir Gebelli	Sirius Software	
Space Quarks	1981	Broderbund	Broderbund	
Space Quest I	1986	Sierra On-Line	Sierra On-Line	
Space Quest II: Vohaul's Revenge	1987	Sierra	Sierra	
Space Vikings	1982	Mitchell Robbins	Sublogic	
Spare Change	1983	Broderbund	Broderbund	
Speedway Classic	1984	Norm Gray	Actioncraft	
Spellevator	1988		MECC	
Spellicopter	1983		Designware	
SpellWielder	2019	Roby Sherman	CrowCousins	Action / Adventure Game
Spider-Man	1985	Adventure International	Adventure International	
Spindizzy	1986	The Softworks Factory	Activision	
Spy Hunter	1986	Bally Midway	Bally Midway	
Spy vs. Spy	1984	First Star Software	First Star Software	action/strategy game, 1 and 2 player support (keyboard, joystick)
Spy's Demise	1982	Alan Zeldin	Penguin Software	
Standing Stones	1983	Peter Schmuckal and Dan Sommers	Electronic Arts	
Star Blazer	1982	StarCraft	Broderbund	
Star League Baseball	1983		Gamestar	
Star Fleet I: The War Begins	1984	Interstel	Interstel	
Star Thief	1981	Jim Nitchals	Cavalier Computer	
Star Trek: The Kobayashi Alternative	1985	MicroMosaics	Simon & Schuster Interactive	
Star Trek: Strategic Operations Simulator	1983	Sega	Sega	
Starcross	1982	Infocom	Infocom	
Starlanes	1977			Interstellar shipping company stock trading game.
Stargate	1983	Atarisoft	Atarisoft	Port of Defender II arcade game
Starship Commander	1981	Gilman Louie	Voyager Software	
Stationfall	April 30, 1987	Steve Meretzky	Infocom	Interactive fiction
Stellar 7	1983	Damon Slye	Software Entertainment Company	
Strange Odyssey	1981	Scott Adams	Adventure International	Scott Adams' sixth game
Strike Fleet	1987	Lucasfilm Games	Electronic Arts	Naval simulation game
Strip Poker	1982	Artworx	Artworx	
Structris	2012	Martin Haye	Martin Haye	Tetris
Suicide!	1981	Steve Hawley	Piccadilly Software	
Sumer	1981		Crystal Computer	
Summer Games	1984	Epyx	Epyx	Sports game
SunDog: Frozen Legacy	1986	FTL Games	Accolade	Space trading game
Super Bunny	1983	Datamost	Datamost	
Super Invader	1979	M. Hata	California Pacific Computer Company	Arcade
Supermartian	1984	Ted Griggs	Computer Easy	
Suspect	1984	Dave Lebling	Infocom	
Suspended	1983	Michael Berlyn	Infocom	
Swashbuckler	1982	Paul Stephenson	Datamost	
Sword of Kadash	1984	Dynamix	Penguin Software	
Sword of Zedec (a.k.a. Pythagoras and the Dragon)	1983	John O'Hare	Krell Software	Text Adventure
SwordThrust	1981	Donald Brown	CE Software	
Syzygy	1983	Ed Hobbs		
T.W.E.R.P.S.	1981	Dan Thompson	Sirius Software	
Tactical Armor Command	1983	Avalon Hill		
Tag Team Wrestling	1984	Quicksilver Software	Data East	
Taipan!	1982	Mega-micro Computers (Art Canfil)	Avalanche Productions	
Tank War	1978	Ed Zaron	Muse Software	Also rereleased in 1980 on The Best of Muse compilation disk.
Tapper	1984	Marvin Glass and Associates	Bally Midway	
Tass Times in Tonetown	1986	Interplay Productions; Brainwave Creations	Activision	Graphic adventure game
Tawala's Last Redoubt	1981	Doug Carlston	Broderbund	
Taxman	1981	Brian Fitzgerald	H.A.L. Labs	A Pac-Man clone
Techno Cop	1988	Gray Matter	US Gold	
Telengard	1982	Daniel Lawrence	Avalon Hill	
Teleport	1982	Mike Abbott & Jim Nitchals	Cavalier Computer	
Temple of Apshai	1979	Automated Simulations	Automated Simulations	
Terrorist	1980	Steven Pederson	Edu-Ware	
Test Drive	1987	Distinctive Software	Accolade	
Tetris	1988	Spectrum Holobyte	Spectrum Holobyte	
Theseus and the Minotaur	1982	Bruce Nesmith	TSR	
Thexder	1987	Synergistic Software	Sierra On-Line	
Think Quick!	1987	The Learning Company	The Learning Company	
Three Mile Island	1979	Richard Orban	Muse Software	
Three Mile Island: Special Edition	1980	Richard Orban	Muse Software	
Threshold	1981	On-Line Systems	On-Line Systems	
Time Tunnels	1983	Paul Coletta	Reston Publishing Company	
Time Zone	1982	Roberta Williams & Rorke Weigandt	On-Line Systems	Also known as Hi-Res Adventure #5
Titan Empire	1981	Ed Zaron	Muse Software	
Torpedos Away	1987		Keypunch Software	contains 4 games: Sub Hunt (aka. Subnodule), Sea Battle, Depth Charge, & Sea Raider.
Track & Field	1984		Atarisoft	
Transylvania	1982	Antonio Antiochia & Steve Meuse	Penguin Software	
Transylvania II: Crimson Crown	1985	Penguin Software	Penguin Software	
Trek of the 49ers	1988	Black, Tran, McNichols, et al.	CUE SoftSwap	
Trinity	1986	Infocom	Infocom	
Trolls and Tribulations	1984	Jimmy Huey	Creative Software	
Troll's Tale	1983	Al Lowe, Sunnyside Soft	Sierra Entertainment	
Tuesday Morning Quarterback	1980	Charles Anderson, Jon Freeman	Automated Simulations	
Ultima	1981	Richard Garriott	California Pacific Computer Company	
Ultima I: The First Age of Darkness	1986	Richard Garriott	Origin Systems	Remake of Ultima from 1981
Ultima II: The Revenge of the Enchantress	1982	Richard Garriott	Sierra On-Line	
Ultima III: Exodus	1983	Richard Garriott	Origin Systems	
Ultima IV: Quest of the Avatar	1985	Richard Garriott	Origin Systems	
Ultima V: Warriors of Destiny	1988	Richard Garriott	Origin Systems	
Ulysses and the Golden Fleece	1981	Ken Williams & Bob Davis	On-Line Systems	Also known as Hi-Res Adventure #4
Valley of the Minotaur	1983	Nicolas van Dyk & Chris M. Evans	Softalk	Interactive fiction
Victory Road	1987	Quicksilver Software	Data East	
Video Stock Market	1985		Computer Adversary Publishing	The first game from the company; an investment strategy game; "a quick (averages 1 and 1/2 hr.) and easy game, useful as a light and friendly evening among other "beer and pretzel" games."
Vindicator	1983	Jimmy Huey	H.A.L. Labs	
Voodoo Castle	1980	Scott Adams & Alexis Adams	Adventure International	
Voodoo Island	1985	Angelsoft	Mindscape	
Warlords	1978	Brian Beninger	Speakeasy Software Ltd	
Wasteland	1988	Interplay Productions	Electronic Arts	
Wavy Navy	1983	Rodney McAuley	Sirius Software	
Wayout	1982	Paul Edelstein	Sirius Software	
Where in America's Past is Carmen Sandiego?	1991	Broderbund	Broderbund	
Where in Europe is Carmen Sandiego?	1988	Broderbund	Broderbund	
Where in North Dakota is Carmen Sandiego?	1989	Broderbund	Broderbund	
Where in Time Is Carmen Sandiego?	1989	Broderbund	Broderbund	
Where in the U.S.A. is Carmen Sandiego?	1986	Broderbund	Broderbund	
Where in the World is Carmen Sandiego?	1985	Broderbund	Broderbund	
Who Framed Roger Rabbit	1988	Buena Vista Software	Buena Vista Software	
Wilderness Campaign	1979	Robert C. Clardy	Synergistic Software	
Willy Byte in the Digital Dimension	1984	Murray Krehbiel	Data Trek	Graphics by Greg Hammond
Windfall: The Oil Crisis Game	1980	Edu-ware	Edu-ware	
Windwalker	1989	Origin Systems	Origin Systems	
Wings of Fury	1987	Steve Waldo	Broderbund	
Wings Out of Shadow	1983		Berserker Works	
Winter Games	1985	Epyx	Epyx	
Wishbringer	1985	Infocom	Infocom	
Wizard and the Princess	1982	Ken Williams & Roberta Williams	On-Line Systems	Also known as Hi-Res Adventure #2
The Wizard of Oz	1985	Windham Classics	Windham Classics	
Wizardry: Proving Grounds of the Mad Overlord	1981	Andrew C. Greenberg & Robert Woodhead	Sir-Tech	RPG
Wizardry II: The Knight of Diamonds	1982	Andrew C. Greenberg & Robert Woodhead	Sir-Tech	RPG
Wizardry III: Legacy of Llylgamyn	1983	Andrew C. Greenberg & Robert Woodhead	Sir-Tech	RPG
Wizardry IV: The Return of Werdna	1987	Andrew C. Greenberg, Robert Woodhead, & Roe R. Adams III	Sir-Tech	RPG
Wizardry V: Heart of the Maelstrom	1988	Andrew C. Greenberg & David W. Bradley	Sir-Tech	RPG
Word Attack!	1984	Davidson & Associates	Davidson & Associates	
Word Munchers	1985	Philip Bouchard, et al.	MECC	
Xonix	1983	Matthais Gerhardt		
Xyphus	1984	Robert "Skip" Waller & Dave Albert	Penguin Software	
Zaxxon	1983	John A. Garcia	Datasoft	
Zenith	1982	Nasir Gebelli	Gebelli Software	
Zork: The Great Underground Empire	1980	Marc Blank, Dave Lebling, Bruce Daniels, & Tim Anderson	Infocom	Interactive fiction
Zork II: The Wizard of Frobozz	1981	Marc Blank, Dave Lebling, Bruce Daniels, & Tim Anderson	Infocom	Interactive fiction
Zork III: The Dungeon Master	1982	Marc Blank, Dave Lebling, Bruce Daniels, & Tim Anderson	Infocom	Interactive fiction
Zork Zero: The Revenge of Megaboz	1989	Steve Meretzky	Infocom	Interactive fiction
Zorro	1985	Rick Mirsky & James Garon	Datasoft	

== See also ==
- List of Apple II application software
- List of Apple IIGS games
- Lists of video games
