= The Book of Adventure Games =

1984 book by Kim Schuette

- Author: Kim R. Schuette
- Illustrator: Jennifer Boynton; Mia McCroskey
- Cover artist: Estela Montesinos
- Language: English
- Subject: Text adventures
- Publisher: Arrays, Inc.
- Publication date: 1984
- Publication place: US
- Pages: 341
- ISBN: 0912003081

The Book of Adventure Games is a book by Kim Schuette published in 1984 by Arrays, Inc.

== Contents ==
The Book of Adventure Games is a strategy guide for 77 text adventure video games, and contains descriptions, reviews, maps, and solutions for each.

- Adventure
- Adventureland
- Adventure in Time
- Ali Baba and the Forty Thieves
- Beneath Apple Manor
- Birth of the Phoenix
- The Blade of Blackpoole
- Castle of Darkness
- Chamber of Xenobia
- The Count
- The Coveted Mirror
- Cranston Manor
- Creature Venture
- Crime Stopper
- Crypt of Medea
- Crystal Caverns
- The Curse of Crowley Manor
- Cyborg
- Dark Crystal
- Deadline
- Death in the Caribbean
- Demon's Forge
- Doom Valley
- Earthquake—San Francisco, 1906
- Empire of the Over-Mind
- Enchanter
- Escape from Rungistan
- Escape from Traam
- Fantasyland, 2041 AD
- G.F.S Sorceress
- Ghost Town
- Golden Voyage
- Gruds in Space
- Infidel
- Kabul Spy
- Knight of Diamonds
- Labyrinth of Crete
- Legacy of Llylgamyn
- Mad Venture
- The Mask of the Sun
- Mission Asteroid
- Secret Mission
- Mummy's Curse
- Mystery Fun House
- Mystery House
- Oldorf's Revenge
- Oo-Topos
- Palace in Thunderland
- Pirate Adventure
- Planetfall
- Pyramid of Doom
- The Queen of Phobos
- The Quest
- The Sands of Egypt
- Savage Island, Part I
- Savage Island, Part II
- Secret Agent: Mission One
- The Serpent's Star
- Sherwood Forest
- Softporn Adventure
- Sorcerer
- Starscross
- Strange Odyssey
- Suspended
- Time Zone
- Transylvania
- Ultima I
- Ultima II
- Ultima III
- Ulysses and the Golden Fleece
- Voodoo Castle
- The Witness
- Wizard and the Princess
- Wizardry
- Zork I
- Zork II
- Zork III

== Reception ==
Allen Varney reviewed The Book of Adventure Games in Space Gamer No. 70. Varney commented that "The Book of Adventure Games is worth the money to any aficionado of 'interactive fiction'." Mike Nicita and Roun Petrusha of Popular Computing commented that "frustrated players will appreciate Schuette's treatment of 77 of the best-known adventure games for its help in learning to play and enjoy them." Similarly, Russ Lockwood of Creative Computing concluded "if you need help with a pre-1984 adventure game, The Book of Adventure Games just might be your salvation."
