= Laufer =

Laufer is a surname. Notable people with the surname include:

- Alexander Laufer, Israeli writer and management consultant
- Amy Laufer, American politician in Virginia
- Berthold Laufer (1874–1934), American anthropologist
- Carlos Laufer, Brazilian musician and songwriter
- Franz-Josef Laufer (born 1952), German footballer
- Henry Laufer, American mathematician
- Johann Lauffer (1752–1833), Swiss-born Curaçaoan governor and businessman
- Peter Laufer, American journalist
- Pierre Lauffer (1920–1981), Curaçaoan poet and writer
- Stefan Laufer (born 1959), German pharmacist
- Tiffany Laufer, American film director
- Walter Laufer (1906–1984), American swimmer

== See also ==
- Laufer (band), a rock band from Croatia
