= Lists of Apple software =

These lists of Apple software cover software for Apple devices, organised by platform.

== Apple II ==
- List of Apple II application software
- List of Apple II games
- List of Apple IIGS games

== Mac ==
- List of Mac games
- List of Mac software
- List of Mac software published by Microsoft
- List of Classic Mac OS software
- List of built-in macOS apps

== Mobile ==
- List of iPod games
- List of iOS games
- List of free and open-source iOS applications
- List of built-in iOS apps
