= Telstar (disambiguation) =

Telstar is a series of satellites, including the first active communications satellite.

Telstar may also refer to:

== Arts and entertainment ==
- "Telstar" (instrumental), a 1962 number 1 hit by the Tornados
- Telstar: The Joe Meek Story, a 2009 feature film about the life of Joe Meek, starring Con O'Neill and Kevin Spacey
- Telstar (game console), a video game console series released by Coleco
- The Telstars, a Swedish pop-jazz group founded by Marcus Österdahl

== Sports ==
- SC Telstar, a Dutch football club based in Velsen
- Telstar (women's football club), based in Velsen
- Adidas Telstar, a football that Adidas designed in 1963 with a truncated icosahedron design and used in FIFA World Cup competition in 1970 and 1974

== Other uses ==
- Ford Telstar, a mid-size car manufactured by the Ford Motor Company
- Telstar trimaran, a trailerable sailboat
- Telstar Records, a British record company
- Telstar TV, a pirate television station in Birmingham, United Kingdom
- Telstar Regional Middle/High School, Maine, United States
- Telstar (apple), a seedling selected from 'Golden Delicious' x 'Kidd's Orange Red'
- Telstar 102.7 FM Makassar, a leading family entertainment radio station in Makassar, South Sulawesi, targeting young adult and millennial families. It was established in 1968

== See also ==
- Telestar, a German television award from 1983 to 1998
- Telstra
- TellStar
