= Bronze Dragon =

Bronze Dragon may refer to:

- Bronze Dragon, a type of dragon in Dungeons & Dragons
- Bronze Dragon: Conquest of Infinity, a 1985 video game

== See also ==
- Percy Jackson and the Bronze Dragon, a short story.
