= Aquatron =

Aquatron may refer to:

== Media ==
- Aquatron (video game), an Apple II and Atari 8-bit 1983 shooter video game

== Research ==
- Dalhousie University Aquatron marine laboratory

== Other ==
- Camas Tuath's Aquatron composting toilet system
