= Black Belt =

Black Belt may refer to:

== Martial arts ==
- Black belt, an indication of expertise in martial arts
- Black Belt (magazine), a magazine covering martial arts news, technique, and notable individuals

== Places ==
- Black Belt in the American South, a region of highly fertile black soil in the American South that was the center of slavery, and continues to have a large black population into the 21st century
- Black Belt (geological formation), geological formation of dark fertile soil in the Southern United States
  - Black Belt (region of Alabama), a geographic and socio-political region of Alabama
- Black Belt (region of Chicago), a historical region in Chicago, Illinois, in the South Side area

== Entertainment ==
- Black Belt Jones, a 1974 action film
- Black Belt (1978 film), an Indian Malayalam film
- Black Belt (2007 film), a Japanese film, also known as Kuro-obi
- Black Belt (1984 video game), game for Apple II and Commodore 64
- Black Belt (1986 video game), game for Master System based on the anime Fist of the North Star
- Black Belt (8-bit Theatre), a character in the webcomic 8-bit Theatre

== Military ==
- Operation Black Belt, Israeli code name for the November 2019 Gaza clashes
