= Theseus and the Minotaur (disambiguation) =

Theseus and the Minotaur is a Greek legend in which the hero Theseus slays the Minotaur, a mythical creature that was part-man, part-bull.

Theseus and the Minotaur may also refer to:

- Theseus and the Minotaur (maze puzzle), a type of logic maze designed by Robert Abbott
- Theseus and the Minotaur (sculpture), a 1781–1782 sculpture by Antonio Canova
- Theseus and the Minotaur (video game), a 1982 video game for the Apple II
