= List of Apple II application software =

This is a list of Apple II applications including utilities and development tools. There is a separate List of Apple II games.

== 0–9 ==
- 3D Art Graphics - 3D computer graphics software, a set of 3D computer graphics effects, written by Kazumasa Mitazawa and released in June 1978

== A ==
- A2Command - Norton Commander style file manager
- ADTPro - telecom
- Apple Writer - word processor
- AppleWorks - integrated word processor, spreadsheet, and database suite (II & GS)
- ASCII Express - telecom

== B ==
- Bank Street Writer - word processor

== C ==
- CatFur - file transfer / chat software for the APPLE-CAT modem
- Cattlecar Galactica - Super Hi-Res Chess in its later, expanded version
- Contiki - 8-bit text web browser
- Copy II+ - copy and disk utilities
- Crossword Magic - Given clues and answers, software automatically arranges the answers into a crossword grid.

== D ==
- Dalton Disk Desintegrator - disk archiver
- Davex - Unix type shell
- Dazzle Draw - bitmap graphics editor
- Design Your Own Home - home design (GS)
- Disk Muncher - disk copy
- Diversi Copy - disk copy (GS)
- DOS.MASTER - DOS 3.3 -> ProDOS utility

== E ==
- Edisoft - text editor
- EasyMailer
- EasyWriter

== F ==
- Fantavision - vector graphics animation package

== G ==
- GEOS - integrated office suite
- GNO/ME - Unix type shell (GS)
- GraphicEdge - business graphics for AppleWorks spreadsheets (II & GS & Mac)
- Great American Probability Machine - first full-screen Apple II animations

== L ==
- Lock Smith - copy and disk utilities
- Logo - easy educational graphic programming language

== M ==
- Magic Window - one of the most popular Apple II word processors by Artsci
- Merlin 8 & 16 - assembler (II & GS)
- Micro-DYNAMO - simulation software to build system dynamics models
- MouseWrite and MouseWrite II - first mouse based word processor for Apple II (II & GS)

== O ==
- Omnis I, II, and III - database/file manager (II & GS)
- Orbit, Orbit II and Orbit II Plus - Satellite Simulation Software (II & GS) Marketed by Paul F. Kisak and KKI
- ORCA - program language suite (II & GS)

== P ==
- Point2Point - computer to computer communications program for chat and file transmission (II)
- PrintShop - sign, banner, and card maker (II & GS)
- ProSel - disk and file utilities (II & GS)
- ProTERM - telecom program and text editor
- PublishIT - desktop publishing (versions 1–4)

== R ==
- Rendezvous - shuttle orbital simulation game

== S ==
- ShrinkIt - disk and file compressor and archiver (II & GS)
- Spectrum Internet Suite - Internet tools and web browser (GS)
- Super Hi-Res Chess - early game aimed at programmers and "power users"
- SynthLAB - music composing software

== T ==
- TellStar - astronomy
- Twilight II - Apple IIGS screensaver (GS)

== V ==
- VisiCalc - spreadsheet

== W ==
- Word Juggler - word processor
- WordPerfect - word processor
- WordStar - word processor

== Z ==
- Z-Link - telecom
- Zardax - word processor
- ZBasic - language - Zedcor Systems
