= Caves of Olympus =

1982 video game

- Developers: Thomas Noone; Patrick Noone
- Publisher: Howard W. Sams and Co.
- Platform: Apple II
- Release: 1982
- Genre: Adventure
- Mode: Single-player

Caves of Olympus is an adventure game for the Apple II designed by Thomas Noone and Patrick Noone and published in 1982 by Howard W. Sams and Co.

== Gameplay ==
Caves of Olympus is a game in which a single-player graphic adventure places players in the role of Anson Argyris, who must navigate a perilous maze—the titular Caves of Olympus—while evading the relentless pursuit of the Laren. Armed with a disintegrator, blaster, and personal force field, players face a series of traps and puzzles en route to an escape shuttle. The game relies on simple 'verb noun' commands and toggling between text and graphics via the Return key. A set of instructions is included on the game disk.

== Reception ==
Michael Mize reviewed Caves of Olympus for Fantasy Gamer magazine and stated that "Basically those features touted as 'special effects' did not succeed in separating this game from other graphic adventures, and the playability of the game did not set it well in that category either. Overall, Caves of Olympus doesn't give in the proportion it takes. Better games at lower prices are available, I can recommend this game only to those gamers who require a challenge no matter what the price."

Jeffrey Mills for InCider called it "an exciting adventure and should be tried by every computer gamer."

Roe R. Adams III for Softalk noted that the game was "intended to be deadly and difficult. The game certainly tries to live up to that reputation! It is definitely not for novice adventurers."

The Best Apple Software rated the game 8.0 and called it "one of the most difficult science-fiction adventures [...] definitely not for novices" while calling some of the puzzles "obscure" and the graphics "weak" but noting that the sound effects enhance the atmosphere.

The Book of Adventure Games II criticized the graphics as "average" and the vocabulary as "terrible" but concluded that the game was "probably interesting enough to make you want to play to the end."

Happy Computer called the game an absolute must for anyone who loves intelligently designed adventures.
