= Crystal Caverns (video game) =

1982 video game

- Developer: Imaginative Systems Software
- Publisher: Hayden Software
- Designer: Daniel Kitchen
- Platforms: Apple II, Commodore 64
- Release: 1982: Apple II; 1984: C64
- Genre: Interactive fiction
- Mode: Single-player

Crystal Caverns is a text adventure written for the Apple II by Daniel Kitchen of Imaginative Systems Software. It was published by Hayden Software in 1982, followed by a Commodore 64 port in 1984.

== Contents ==
Crystal Caverns is a treasure-hunt game which takes place in a mansion, as well as in the woods and in tunnels.

== Reception ==
Kelly Grimes reviewed Crystal Caverns in Space Gamer No. 64. Grimes commented that "It is a nice change of pace from hack-and-slash or space shoot-em-ups, but it is not worth the price." In Softalk, Roe Adams commented that the game is "written primarily for intermediate level adventurers" and concluded that it "offers several hours of enjoyable fun and thought." In The Book of Adventure Games, Kim Schuette commented on the "imagininatively written, highly descriptive text, and several very well done puzzles", concluding that the game was "all in all, rather interesting."
