= Starbase Hyperion =

1980 video game

- Publisher: Quality Software
- Designer: Don Ursem
- Platforms: Sorcerer, Atari 8-bit
- Release: 1980: Sorcerer; 1981: Atari
- Genre: Strategy

Starbase Hyperion is a strategy video game written by Don Ursem for the Exidy Sorcerer and published by Quality Software in 1980. A port to Atari 8-bit computers followed in 1981.

== Contents ==
Starbase Hyperion is a strategic space game which the player is a starbase commander whose base comes under attack by the forces of an invading alien empire.

== Reception ==
Tom M. Buchanan reviewed Starbase Hyperion in The Space Gamer No. 34. Buchanan commented that "This is an excellent computer simulation game. The full graphics and real-time combat displays make the game visually challenging. If you're looking for a game with challenging play instead of complex rules and you own a Sorcerer computer, this game is a must."
