= Adventure in Time =

1981 video game

- Publisher: Phoenix Software
- Designer: Paul Berker
- Platforms: Apple II, Atari 8-bit
- Release: 1981: Apple II; 1983: Atari 8-bit
- Genre: Interactive fiction

Adventure in Time is a text adventure written by Paul Berker for the Apple II. It was published in 1981 by Phoenix Software, followed by a version for Atari 8-bit computers in 1983.

By means of text descriptions and two word text commands, the player travels through four locations in time, attempting to find and kill Nostradamus before he assembles a world destroying weapon.

== Development ==
Adventure in Time was the first game released by Illinois software company Phoenix Software, after developer Ron Unrath contacted programmer Paul Berker about writing an adventure game for the Apple II in 1980.

== Reception ==
Rudy Kraft reviewed Adventure in Time in The Space Gamer No. 49. Kraft commented that "Although the game does provide a little fun, there are many better games on the market. Your money would be better spent on one of them." Mike Flyn of Hardcore Computing commented that while it was relatively easy, "I also found it to be rather entertaining, and on that note I do recommend it." In The Book of Adventure Games, Kim Schuette commented that "The crisp, quick response, tongue-in-cheek style, and save option further add to the game's appeal." Softalk magazine compared the game to the works of Scott Adams. Editor Margot Comstock considered the majority of puzzles in the game to be straight-forward and not too difficult. She noted several unavoidable death traps that reminded her of Adams' game design.
