= Cavalier Computer =

Defunct American video game company

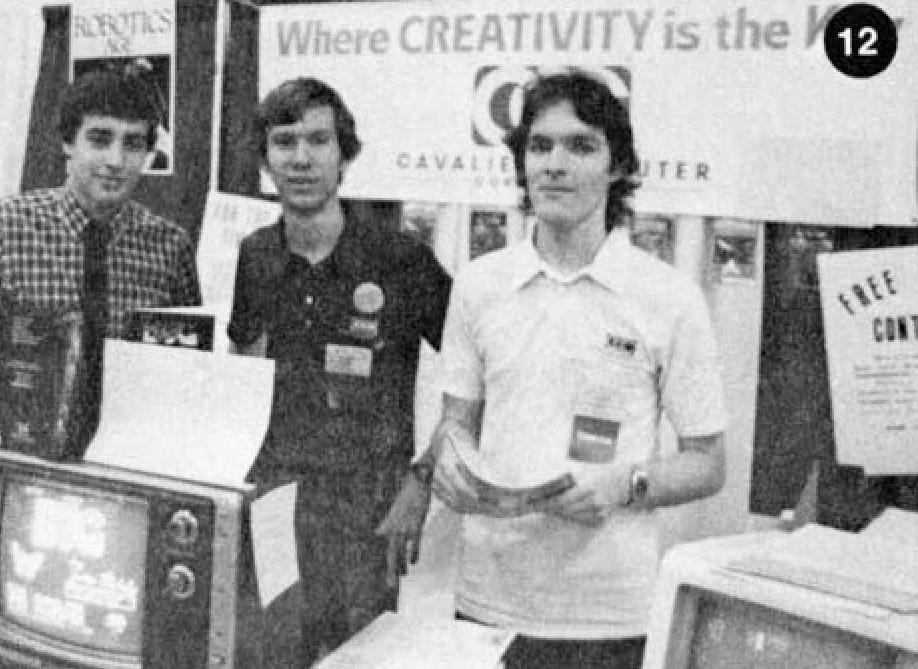
- Booth at West Coast Computer Faire
- Company type: Private
- Industry: Video games
- Founded: 1980
- Founder: Jim Nitchals; Barry Printz
- Fate: Defunct
- Headquarters: Del Mar, California, United States

Cavalier Computer, later Cavalier Computer Corporation, is a defunct software company that produced video games for the Apple II. The company was founded in 1981 by high school classmates Jim Nitchals and Barry Printz and achieved an early success with Bug Attack, a game similar to Centipede that ranked among the top 30 software titles of 1982. Jim Nitchals died at age 36 in 1998.

== Software ==
- Asteroid Field by Jim Nitchals (1980)
- Bug Attack by Jim Nitchals (1981)
- Microwave by Jay P. Zimmerman and Jim Nitchals (1982)
- Raiders of the lost Ring, sometimes called Ring Raiders, by Jim Nitchals (1981). A clone of Star Castle.
- Star Thief by Jim Nitchals (1981)
- Teleport by Mike Abbott and Jim Nitchals (1982)
