= The Queen of Phobos =

1982 video game

- Manual cover
- Publisher: Phoenix Software
- Programmer: Paul Berker
- Artist: William R. Crawford
- Writer: William R. Crawford
- Platform: Apple II
- Release: 1982
- Genre: Interactive fiction

The Queen of Phobos is a graphical text adventure for the Apple II published by American studio Phoenix Software in 1982.

== Gameplay ==
The monochrome graphics of The Queen of Phobos.

The game is represented by still black and white line images accompanied by short text descriptions, and controlled by means of two word text commands. The player searches the derelict Martian spacecraft Queen of Phobos for the "Mask of Kuh-Thu-Lu" while avoiding or killing the four looters also searching for the mask.

== Reception ==
The game was well-received, with Kim Schuette describing it as "A well implemented, nicely paced, fast acting adventure of average difficulty" in his 1984 Book of Adventure Games. Margo Comstock Tommervik of Softalk commented that "It's a hi-res adventure, but the graphics—unusual well-done line drawings, not color—are used for a scenario that would do fine as a text adventure, and not for their own sake", concluding "Queen of Phobos offers several evenings of pleasurable, if frustrating, diversion for the adventurer." In Creative Computing, Graham Unwin rated Queen of Phobos a 4/5 for quality of graphics and a 2/5 for complexity.
