= Crosscountry (video game series) =

Crosscountry USA
- Genre: Educational
- Developer: Ingenuity Works (Didatech Software)
- Publisher: Ingenuity Works
- Platforms: Apple II, Classic Mac OS, MS-DOS, Linux, Windows

Crosscountry is a series of educational video games for North American students (grade one through grade nine). The games are published by Ingenuity Works, a Vancouver-based company originally known as Didatech Software.

Most of the games simulate driving an 18-wheeler, picking up and delivering commodities to the specified cities, and making decisions about the best route, when to eat, sleep, get gas, etc., in order to earn the most money.

== Crosscountry USA (1985) ==
This was the first game in the series, released in 1985 by Didatech Software (later renamed to Ingenuity Works). Educational Software Reviews deemed it "the type of game you can play for a full hour without getting tired." Developed for the PC, the purpose of the game is to pick up commodities from one city and deliver them to another by driving across the country. Players interacted with the game through a command line using commands such as "turn on truck". Players also had an option to use visuals to play if they had a compatible mouse.

== Crosscountry Canada (1986) ==
This was the second game in the series, released in 1986 for the Apple II by Didatech Software, and later ported to DOS in 1991. It was also ported to the ICON, the made-in-Canada educational computer platform. Home of the Underdogs deemed Crosscountry Canada "one of the best edutainment titles ever made".

== Crosscountry California (1987) ==
As titled, players of this game are restricted to the boundaries of California. The gameplay was similar to Crosscountry USA.

== Crosscountry Texas (1987) ==
The game was the first geography simulation to be designed specifically for Texas schools. The game contained simulated travel from city to city throughout Texas. The game sees players travel to 135 cities and collect up to 55 commodities; the game requires 128Kb to run, and the school version includes a back-up disk and a teacher 's manual. This version was created without the state's involvement, similar to California, and in contrast to the North Dakota edition which would be released in 1992. According to Paul Melhus, president of Didatech, the simulation of Texas was designed to be as realistic as possible. The game was not used in Del Rio, as school officials noted the limited use of computers within education. The title was released onto DOS and the Apple II. The paper Technology: Window to the Future. Proceedings of the Annual State Conference of the Texas Computer Education Association noted that the game was more attractive to Texan teachers than Crosscountry USA due to the "proximity and familiarity with the content".

== Crosscountry North Dakota (1992) ==
In October 1992, Didatech announced a deal with North Dakota's Department of Public Instruction to create a state-specific version of the software for the state's schools. The state would provide statistical data to adapt Cross Country USA to a North Dakotan edition. Didatech estimated a production schedule of 100 hours, much quicker than the year taken for the USA version. This came off the heels of the Canada, California, and Texas versions. The game was unique in that Didatech worked with the state's officials directly in production, while the Texan and Californian versions were created without the states' input. At the time of the announcement, Didatech was arranging deals similar to the North Dakotan one with the US states of Illinois and Virginia and the Canadian provinces of British Columbia and Ontario. The game was released onto the Apple II, while a DOS version was being worked on for release the following year. The Computer Paper felt the project "makes the most of what the small firm has".

The game turned out to be cost-effective; the state invested $45,000 and supplied information for the software maker to use, while Didatech produced the game and manual. Didatech sold a school version of the software to the state, which then sold it directly to schools; meanwhile Didatech would sell a separate retail version through its traditional retail channels. The cost per school was only $65, versus $350 for the site license of a national title. Didatech president Paul Melhus asserted that this type of collaboration was better suited to smaller states due to them being less bureaucratic, more flexible, and more open to innovation.

This formula was inspired by the 1989 video game Where in North Dakota Is Carmen Sandiego?.

== Crosscountry Canada Platinum (2000) ==
This version of Crosscountry Canada incorporates several updates since 1991, including the new territory of Nunavut (entered Confederation in 1999) and the Confederation Bridge, which was completed in 1997 and connects Prince Edward Island and New Brunswick.

== Crosscountry USA 2 (2002) ==
The game was released in 2002, by Ingenuity Works.

== Crosscountry Canada 2 (2002) ==
Crosscountry Canada 2 cover art

This game was released in 2002, by Ingenuity Works. Players drive an 18-wheeler truck picking up and delivering commodities across Canada while learning about provinces, cities, territories and more. Making wise decisions along the way will result in a successful trip. It features different large cities throughout Canada, and is an on-rails driving game.

== Crosscountry USA Photo Safari (2002) ==
This game was released in 2002, by Ingenuity Works. The game is "much like Crosscountry USA 2 but with a focus on animals rather than commodities".

== Crosscountry Canada Photo Safari (2002) ==
This game was released in 2002, by Ingenuity Works. The game is "much like Crosscountry Canada 2 but with a focus on animals rather than commodities".

== Crosscountry BC (2002) ==
This game was released in 2002, by Ingenuity Works. As titled, players in this game are restricted to the boundaries of the Canadian province of British Columbia (BC).

== Notes ==
- Middle School Journal, 1994
- The Software Catalog: Microcomputers, 1987
