= Baratin Blues =

1986 video game

- Developer: Froggy Software
- Platform: Apple II
- Release: 1986
- Genres: Adventure, interactive fiction

Baratin Blues is a 1986 video game developed by Froggy Software for the Apple II.

== Gameplay ==
Set in Paris, the objective of Baratin Blues is to prevent a biological attack on the sewers, lodged by terrorists who aim to launch a missile from Saint-Tropez. Assuming the role of a Police investigator, the player explores locations of interest in Paris such as the Seine, its quays, the Paris Catacombs, and locates persons of interest to find clues. Players can type parser commands to progress, such to "look" at elements in a scene, or "push" interactable objects. Once players have collected all clues in a scene, which comprise fragments of a word, they can assemble a word to reveal the destination of the next scene.

== Development ==
Baratin Blues was developed by Froggy Software, a development studio founded by Jean-Louis Le Breton and Fabrice Gille in 1984. The cofounders were members of the May 68 student protests, and sought to create a games company to spread their ideas through "humor, politics and new technologies". The game is a political satire of the actions of Paris mayor Jacques Chirac during his attempts to privatize companies providing drinking water to the city.

== Reception ==
Reception

Review score
Publication	Score
Jeux & Strategie	2/5

Casus Belli praised Baratin Blues for its "impeccable visuals, impressively snappy game mechanics, and a script full of humor", considering its simplification of dialog helped "give the storyline and messages more room to breathe". Jeux & Strategie felt the game was fun, but "not exactly thrilling", considering it a difficult game and that its design was catered more to the "habits and methods of seasoned adventure gamers" rather than a general audience.
