= Gemstone Healer =

1986 video game

- Developer: Paradigm Creators
- Publisher: Strategic Simulations
- Designers: Peter W. V. Lount; Trouba Gossen; Kevin P. Pickell
- Platforms: Apple II, Commodore 64
- Release: 1986
- Genre: Action-adventure
- Mode: Single-player

Gemstone Healer is an action-adventure game created by Canadian developer Paradigm Creators for the Apple II and Commodore 64 and published in 1986 by Strategic Simulations. The sequel to Gemstone Warrior, the player controls an armored figure in search of treasure and the way to heal the Gemstone.

== Plot ==
The game takes place after the events of Gemstone Warrior. In the first game, the player had to recover the Gemstone, a relic of incredible power forged by the gods and focusing the natural magic of the world. This, they entrusted to Man alone and for a time, there was great prosperity and peace. But the Demons, led by Nicodemius, had managed to boil to the surface and take the Gemstone. Unable to destroy it, Nicodemius fragments it into five pieces that they hide in their vast lair. By going into the Netherworld, the protagonist is assumed to have succeeded in this quest and returns with the Gemstone.

However, the Gemstone's magic has been lost. In the sequel, the player must now journey to the Center where the gods had forged the Gemstone and restore the balance of the magic within it by splitting it once more and healing each piece. This time, the player will have to contend with the challenge of discovering the tools that can restore the magic to the Gemstone as well as facing Nicodemius himself.

== Gameplay ==
The player is asked to name the dungeon that will be created for the game. Dungeon map generation is based on the first twelve letters of the name that the player gives their dungeon ensuring that new names will create new dungeons for added challenge. Three major difficulty levels are also offered.

The game is viewed in a 2D screen displaying the playing area, health, and inventory. The player controls an armored figure that wields a crossbow with a limited supply of bolts that can be replenished by finding more within the dungeon areas. Special "fireballs" can also be launched against foes, although these are limited and are not as common. The player is also able to use a sword. There are also magical tools and other items that can be collected to provide a variety of benefits such as goblets that can restore health to crystal balls that can annihilate everything on the screen.

The dungeons are filled with a variety of dangers and secret doors. Many brutal monsters fill the caverns ranging from skeletal warriors, exploding gas plants, to Nicodemius himself. The player is also able to search the corpses of monsters that remain behind, chests, and coffins for supplies. Monsters do not always respawn in zones, leaving behind only their corpse as a reminder that the player had been there, although some do return to life such as Nicodemius himself who can be "killed" but may eventually return.

The goal is to split the Gemstone on one of the altars that are in the game and the place the pieces on other altars and then "heal" them with the use of healing tools that are found throughout the Center.

== Reception ==
Gemstone Healer was much less successful than its predecessor, only selling 6,030 copies in North America.
