= Margot Comstock =

American computer magazine editor

Margot Comstock (formerly Margot Comstock Tommervik, October 11, 1940 – October 7, 2022 (aged 81)) was co-founder and editor of Softalk magazine, which was influential in the Apple II community, as part of a growing personal computing movement.

== Career ==
Comstock worked as a freelance textbook editor, magazine article writer, and journalist. She also enjoyed playing games, and in 1979 she won more than $15,000 on the television game show Password. She and her husband Allan Tommervik purchased an Apple II+ with some of the money. She was enthusiastic about trying games and other software for the computer, along with its larger potential for helping people try new things. They decided to start a magazine for other Apple users, using the rest of the prize money and a second mortgage on their home.

=== Softalk ===
Comstock and Tommervik founded Softalk in 1980. They got in contact with a company called Softape that distributed Apple II software and had a newsletter, and they arranged to take over the newsletter and develop it into an Apple II enthusiast magazine. Comstock was 39 at the time. She set the vision for the magazine as taking a journalistic approach, instead of focusing on programming as other contemporary computer magazines did. This made the magazine accessible to Apple II users who weren't programmers. Comstock's work was part of a transition in personal computing around this time, from computers being hobbyist projects to computers getting used by people interested in games and practical applications.

Comstock and Tommervik published the last issue of Softalk in 1984, because fewer companies were paying for advertising, due to a larger shift in the industry, and they did not have money to print more issues.

=== After Softalk ===
In 1987, a Smithsonian video history project interviewed Comstock alongside people who had published popular software for the Apple II.

Comstock and Tommervik later published Softline, a game magazine with funding from Ken Williams. They also published several books, including a Mac book by Doug Clapp.

Comstock was an associate designer for Rama, an adventure game published in 1996.

Comstock gave a keynote presentation at KansasFest in 2014.

== See also ==
- Byte
