= Pentapus =

1983 video game

- Developer: Jeremy Sagan
- Publisher: Turning Point Software
- Artist: Peter Perez
- Platform: Apple II
- Release: 1983
- Genre: Shoot 'em up
- Mode: Single-player

Pentapus is a shoot 'em up for the Apple II published by Turning Point Software in 1983. It was developed by Jeremy Sagan, son of astronomer Carl Sagan. The player battles an army of enemies led by the Pentapus.

== Gameplay ==
Gameplay screenshot

Players move a weapon, a Stargate, which is able to fire projectiles to defeat enemies, but is also vulnerable to bombs and has five lives. The game contains four difficulty levels of play, from K to 1-3, with the K level featuring slower paced gameplay designed for children. In each level, a player must defeat three waves of enemies, and then defeat the Pentapus. The game is compatible with a joystick, features a pause system, and allows high scores to be saved and written to the disk.

== Reception ==
Reception

Review scores
Publication	Score
1984 Software Encyclopedia	6/10
The Book of Apple Software	D+
Core	6/10
Electronic Fun	2/5

Pentapus received mixed reviews. Positive reviews praised the novelty and challenge of the game. Creative Computing stated Pentapus was an "exciting game" that featured "great sound and graphics" with "interesting twists to the arcade format". Writing for Electronic Games, Rick Teverbaugh praised the game's imagination, stating that although the game "owes its look to Galaxian...there is just enough new strategy (to) keep even the most accomplished Galaxian player befuddled.

Some reviewers were mixed on the strengths and weaknesses of the game. While Jeff Hurlburt for SoftSide Magazine found the game to be "an attractive, slickly presented game", he also stated "experienced arcade players may be disappointed", noting the "implementation of the stargate weapon leaves much to be desired. Movement control is very sluggish. The stargate responds as though attached to the paddle with a set of rubber bands." Negative reviews felt the game was unfairly designed. George Kopp of Electronic Fun stated Pentapus was a "difficult shoot 'em up, but unlike other shoot 'em ups like Centipede, the difficulty lies in faults of design, not gameplay". The Book of Apple Software critiqued the fairness of the game's combat, stating "conceptually it is flawed, for the player's cannon is never safe during the attack. It appears that survival is more a matter of luck than skill."
