= Lords of Karma =

1980 video game

- Original box cover
- Publisher: Avalon Hill
- Platforms: Apple II, PET, TRS-80, Atari 8-bit, Commodore 64
- Release: NA: 1980
- Genre: Adventure
- Mode: Single-player

Lords of Karma is a text adventure that was produced by Avalon Hill in 1980. It was released for the Apple II, Commodore PET, Atari 8-bit computers, TRS-80, and Commodore 64.

== Gameplay ==
Lords of Karma differed from many text adventure games of the time in that it introduced an element of randomness to the game. The exact layout of the land changed subtly between plays (and sometimes even changed during play), and encounters with characters friendly and unfriendly and the obtaining of items and treasure were also a matter of random chance. Actions performed by the player could also affect character interaction. Non-player characters (both friendly and unfriendly) could also follow (or chase) the player from location to location; an unusual feature in text adventures of the day.

The game borrows from Eastern mythology as it places the player in the mystical land of Golconda. The player begins the game Golconda's central square and must then explore Golconda and complete tasks that are presented, periodically returning to a temple to pray or give offerings. Areas included redwood, pine, and oak forests, a swamp, a central town, a sewer system, and several underground areas.

The purpose of the game is to accumulate "karma points", which are necessary for the character to go directly to Heaven. The player is never informed how many karma points are needed, and the chosen number of points is another example of the game's randomness as it changes from game to game; some games end nearly instantly due to a very low karma point goal being randomly chosen, while others can last for hours.

The accumulation of points is affected by the player's ability to complete tasks (such as retrieving a rare object or returning a kidnapped princess to her father), the offering of treasures to the gods and praying, and the treatment of other characters in the game (killing a friendly character results in a substantial drop in karma points, for example). If the player is killed before the needed number of points is accumulated, the player is "reborn" atop a mountain, and his/her inventory of goods is scattered randomly around Golconda. (If a player's karma points are in the negative range, they also briefly "burns in hell" to cleanse any sins.)

A major flaw in the game was its load time. Even after it had been loaded via data cassette, which was a lengthy process in itself - the game manual warns that it can take as long as 10 minutes - the game would require some time to set itself up for every play (the manual refers to this as "setting up the board"). Depending on the processing speed of the computer, this load time could last five minutes or more. However, the game only needed to do this once per play. One could also argue that the element of randomness that seemed present in the map was actually a flaw, as exits seemed to appear and disappear spontaneously. Leaving and entering the room from a different exit or simply typing the look command repeatedly would usually resolve this. The game's parser also caused a number of grammatical errors.

== Reception ==
Electronic Games in 1981 stated that Lords of Karma "provides an unusually wide variety of adventuring experiences in a single program. Definitely a stand-out among text adventures."

Dave Albert reviewed Lords of Karma in The Space Gamer No. 43. Albert commented that "All in all, Lords of Karma is a good adventure. There are plenty of locations and a fairly wide variety of situations to face. The program is done in machine languages and executes quickly. It is well written and thematically consistent, and requires no esoteric knowledge on the part of the user. If you like this type of computer game, then I would recommend Lords of Karma. It is really quite enjoyable. However, if you are expecting more than a simple adventure, then you may be disappointed. Avalon Hill has not broken any new ground; they have only covered known territory well."
