= Kaves of Karkhan =

1981 video game

Kaves of Karkham
- Publisher: Level-10
- Platform: Apple II
- Release: 1981
- Genre: dungeon-crawling

Kaves of Karkhan is a 1981 video game published by Level-10.

== Gameplay ==
Kaves of Karkhan is a game in which a dungeon-crawling adventure is set in a mountain labyrinth where the player must defeat the evil wizard Maldemere. It begins with role-playing elements like character class selection and party assembly. Townspeople contribute single-use items to solve traps. The graphics rely on static displays and two-word command inputs.

In Kaves of Karkhan, adventurers descend into perilous underground passages where they face monstrous threats, driven by a mission to reach the summit of Mount Karkhan and place a magical stone upon Maldamere's bier before the malevolent entity devours the Wizard.

== Reception ==
Your Computer declared that the game was number three in the USA for December 1981.

Rob Greenberg reviewed Kaves of Karkhan for Pegasus magazine and stated that "Overall, the high-resolution pictures were well done and interesting. However, the traps were so difficult to get past that almost no progress was made after several hours of playing the game."

Computer Gaming World praised the game manual for its character profiles and detailed character drawings.

The Book Of Apple Computer Software 1982 declared that "Unfortunately, the game doesn't measure up to the promise of the documentation which, while it is the best part of the package, fails to point out that pressing “S” will quiet the eternal clicking of one’s movement. Kids may enjoy it once someone shows them how to solve a few of the puzzles which, while not too difficult, are a bit different."

Karl Westerholm reviewed Kaves of Karkhan for Fantasy Gamer magazine and stated that "I wouldn't recommend this game to anyone who is looking for fast, exciting play, but if you are an incurable puzzle buff it might prove interesting."
