= Black Belt (1984 video game) =

1984 video game

- Publisher: Earthware Computer Services
- Programmer: Kevin Ryan
- Platforms: Apple II, Commodore 64
- Release: 1984
- Genres: Fighting, educational
- Modes: Single-player, multiplayer

Black Belt is a fighting game published in 1984 by Earthware Computer Services for the Apple II and Commodore 64. It was released as an educational video game supplement to real life taekwondo training. The player spars with another human or computer opponent while strictly adhering to the rules of the sport including scoring and penalties. Black Belt is the fourth game from Earthware and the second programmed by Kevin Ryan for the company.

== Gameplay ==
Black Belt is a taekwondo simulator with strict rules that are closely modeled after the real life sport. A player participates in one-on-one matches with either another player or a computer opponent. Competitors face each other in a ring alongside a referee and a heads-up display consisting of a timer and score boards. Opponents can move forward and backward on the mat as well as up and down onto three separate horizontal planes. Matches have a two-minute limit and points are scored by successfully landing or parrying blows. A competitor can become fatigued, reducing their ability to attack or respond. The referee will perform a ten-second count should a challenger be knocked down, after which they will lose the match. Contestants can also be warned by the referee if the rules are broken, such as turning one's back on a rival, stalling the match, or leaving the mat. After a number of warnings, they are disqualified. The game contains six computer opponents of increasing difficulty, corresponding to their belt color: white, yellow, green, blue, red and black. Each time the player fights a certain adversary, a new technique can be executed. A "Practice Session" mode allows the player to view the techniques, demonstrated in three speeds (slow, medium, and fast). The player can create save files recording fighters' numbers of victories and losses. The game can be controlled with either a keyboard or joystick.

== Development and release ==
Black Belt was programmed by Kevin Ryan for publisher Earthware Computer Services, based in Eugene, Oregon. The company had previously published the Apple II titles Volcanos, Star Search, and Zoo Master, the last of which was also programmed by Ryan and released in 1983. Alongside the instructions for Black Belt was a handbook containing a message from Earthware head Donna J. Goles, explaining that the game should serve as an educational supplement to traditional taekwondo training. She concluded, "If it has no other effect, we hope it will help to dispel the image of aggressive violence which shrouds the image of all of the martial arts owing to television." The handbook includes history, terminology, and rules of the sport. Ryan consulted with his own taekwondo instructor Master Hwang in Eugene for its gameplay intricacies. Although both versions of the game contain a 1984 copyright, the Apple II edition may have been available as early as 1983. However, the Apple-centric magazine Softalk did not list the game as new commercially released software until its June 1984 issue. The game is compatible with the Apple Mockingboard for additional sound. The Commodore 64 port replaced the graphical dithering in its Apple II counterpart with more individual colors and added synthesized speech. Ryan began working for the newly-founded Dynamix in 1984 shortly after the release of Black Belt.

== Reception ==
Sparse critical reception of Black Belt was mostly positive. Rick Teverbaugh praised the game in Computer Gaming World while mistaking its form of martial arts as karate instead of taekwondo: "If it weren't for Competition Karate, this would be the game all other karate games would be measured against [...] The graphics are fluid and well-drawn. It is quite easy to see what you're doing and its effect on the other combatant." The Book of Apple Software rated Black Belt with a B−, similarly appreciating the graphics and animation and summarizing it as vividly and realistically recreating the sport of taekwondo. Eric Cabérla of the French magazine Tilt was conversely disappointed in its visuals while also criticizing the quality of the sound effects. Hardcore Gaming 101 noted that Black Belt technically contains the first fighting game tutorial and that having different horizontal planes on which to battle pre-dates the similar mechanic in Fatal Fury.
