= Quality Software =

American software company

Q.S.I., Inc.
- Trade name: Quality Software
- Industry: Video games Computer software
- Founded: 1978
- Founder: Bob Pierce; Bob Christiansen
- Headquarters: Chatsworth, California; Reseda, California
- Key people: James Albanese; Lars X Savant; Denise Delgato

Q.S.I., Inc., doing business as Quality Software, is a defunct American software developer and publisher which created games, business software, and development tools for the Exidy Sorcerer, Apple II, and Atari 8-bit computers in the late 1970s and early 1980s. Asteroids in Space, written by programmer Bruce Wallace, was voted one of the most popular games of 1978-80 by Softalk magazine. The company was founded by Bob Pierce and Bob Christiansen in late 1978. It began downsizing heavily in 1984 amid a lawsuit with Atarisoft for breach of contract, Quality Software alleging that Atarisoft owed the company $150,000 in development services. Quality Software stopped trading in 1985 but existed on paper until formally dissolving in California in 1992.

== Games ==
1979

- Starbase Hyperion by Don Ursem

1980

- Asteroids in Space by Bruce Wallace, later renamed Meteoroids in Space
- Battleship Commander by Matthew Jew and Erik Kilk
- Fastgammon by Bob Christiansen
- Fracas by Stuart Smith
- Head-On Collision by Lee Anders
- Tank Trap by Don Ursem
- Tari Trek by Fabio Ehrengruber

1981

- Ali Baba and the Forty Thieves by Stuart Smith
- Block Buster
- Martian Invaders by James Albanese
- QS Reversi by Lee Merrill

1982

- Beneath Apple Manor Special Edition by Don Worth
- Jeepers Creepers by James Albanese
- Name That Song by Jerry White

1983

- The Return of Heracles by Stuart Smith

== Development tools ==
- Assembler by Gary Shannon (Atari 8-bit, 1980)
- 6502 Disassembler by Bob Pierce (Atari 8-bit, 1980)
- Exidy Forth by James Albanese (Exidy Sorcerer, 1980)
- DPX Development Pac Extension by Don Ursem (Exidy Sorcerer, 1980)
- QS Forth by James Albanese (Atari 8-bit, 1981). It was used to write Jeepers Creepers, also by Albanese.
- Character Magic by Chris Hull (Atari 8-bit)

== Books ==
- Worth, Don; Lechner, Pieter (1981), Beneath Apple DOS, Quality Software, ISBN 0-912985-00-3
