= Tiffany Laufer =

American film director, screenwriter, children's author and photographer

Tiffany Ann Laufer is an American film director, screenwriter, children's author and photographer. Her photos have appeared in the Wall Street Journal, New York Times, and NPR.

Laufer studied cinematography at The American Film Institute and undergraduate studies at Georgetown University. She wrote and directed the award-winning short film, The Acorn Penny. She has written and illustrated three children's books: The Porch Dream, Bellaboo & Colby's Colors of Summer and Bellaboo & B–Bug's Book of Counting.

She presently is the Creative Lead in Photography & Film for The Jackson Laboratory (Nonprofit).

== Filmography ==
=== Director ===
- Rare Not Rare (2019) Short Film
- Seaglass (2015) Short Film
- Honor Society (2013) Short Film
- If You Listen (2011) Documentary Short
- The Acorn Penny (2009) Short Film (Award Winning)
- Journey To Your Plate Cooking Show for TV featuring Jack Hourigan(2006)

=== Music videos ===
- Hazy by Dakota Floyd (2002)
- Girlfriend by Uptown Sinclair Starring Dave Hill (comedian) (2001)
- Alternate version: Girlfriend by Uptown Sinclair Starring Fred Armisen (2001)

== Bibliography ==
=== Children's books ===
- I Love Sea Creatures (2012)
- The Porch Dream (2009)
- Bellaboo & B-Bugs Book of Counting (2008)
- Bellaboo & Colby's Colors of Summer (2008)

=== Visual art books ===
- Honor Society: a photo essay of the short film (2012)

== Awards ==
The Acorn Penny was awarded First Place (Experimental Film Category) Twin Rivers Multimedia Festival May 2010.

Bronze Telly Award | A New Partner in Research - for Nonprofit branded content (The Jackson Laboratory) Laufer served as Director/DP/Producer - 2018

Bronze Telly Award | Alzheimer's POV Campaign - for Nonprofit branded content (The Jackson Laboratory) Laufer served as Director/DP/Producer - 2019
