= The Serpent's Star =

1983 video game

- Developer: Ultrasoft
- Publisher: Broderbund
- Programmers: Atari 8-bit Jeff Johannigman; Commodore 64; Scott Shumway
- Platforms: Apple II, Atari 8-bit, Commodore 64
- Release: 1983: Apple; 1984: Atari; 1985: C64
- Genre: Interactive fiction
- Mode: Single-player

The Serpent's Star is an interactive fiction game with graphics. It was developed by Ultrasoft and published by Broderbund for the Apple II in 1983 as the sequel to The Mask of the Sun. Ports followed for the Atari 8-bit computers (1984) and Commodore 64 (1985).

== Gameplay ==
Gameplay screenshot (Atari 8-bit)

The game takes place in Tibet. The player named Mac Steele is an archaeologist, who tries to find a valuable diamond called "The Serpent's Star". He needs 13 scrolls, which provide advice to the diamond's hideout in the town of Kara-Koram. Therefore, Mac Steele has to travel through Tibet, to solve a lot of puzzles and to meet other non-player characters, e.g. Buddhist monks.

The single-player adventure is controlled via typed keyboard commands. Words and simple sentences are entered in a text parser.

== Reception ==
Softline stated, "if you liked Mask of the Sun, you'll probably like Serpent's Star. Most of us did". Antic called it "a good, challenging game". A reviewer for German magazine Happy Computer praised the thrilling, atmospheric storyline, the complexity of the riddles, and the graphics.
