= Softape =

Software company

Softape was a software company that published video games, utilities, and productivity programs for the Apple II personal computers in the late 1970s and early 1980s. It was co-founded by William V. R. Smith, Bill Depew and Gary Koffler. In 1980, the company's name was changed to Artsci, Inc. and they now operate as an internet service provider as well as publish literature on amateur radio.

Softape's Software Exchange newsletter, Softalk, was started in 1979 as a club newsletter, of which there were only two editions. Its success caused Softape to look for partners to handle a monthly format magazine. Margot Comstock and Al Tommervik joined the effort in 1980 and the new group re-designed it into the Apple II enthusiast magazine Softalk.

== Software ==
Softape published at least 20 games for the Apple II:

- Crazy Eights by William Smith (1979)
- Solitaire Poker by William Smith (1979)
- Fighter Pilot by Steve Baker (1978)
- Go-moku by Steve Baker (1979)
- Photar by Steve Baker (1981), originally called Nightcrawler
- Microgammon by Steve Baker
- Burn-Out by Steve Baker
- Bubbles by Steve Baker
- Planetoids by Steve Baker
- Baker's Trilogy by Steve Baker; includes Bubbles, Burnout and Planetoids
- Star Mines by Steve Baker (1983)
- Apple 21 by Bill DePew (1978)
- Draw Poker by Ken Labaw (1981)
- Crossword by Jim and Vicki Neville (1980)
- Crazy Eights by Bill Smith (c. 1979)
- Craps by Roger Walker (1979)
- Pro Golf I by Jim Wells (1979)
- Roulette by Roger Walker (1979)
- Bomber by Bob Bishop (1979)
- Forte by Gary Shannon (1980)
- AppleTalker by Bob Bishop (1979)
- AppleLis'ner by Bob Bishop (1979)
- TicTacTalker by Bill Depew (1979)
- Jupiter Express Gary Shannon (1979)
- Talking Calculator by Bob Bishop (1980)
