= Wings Out of Shadow =

1983 video game

- Publisher: Baen Enterprises
- Writer: Fred Saberhagen
- Platform: Apple II
- Release: 1983

Wings Out of Shadow is a video game published by Baen Enterprises in 1983 for the Apple II. It is a named for a short story in the Berserker series by Fred Saberhagen, involving the hospital ship the Hope, its escort carrier Judith, and their complement of nine outnumbered fighter ships. Saberhagen wrote the in-game text.

== Reception ==
John D. Burtt reviewed Wings Out of Shadow in Space Gamer No. 69. Burtt commented that "The programmers involved in this project did a very impressive job. Wings Out of Shadow is a good start for the Saberhagens, Berserker Works, Ltd., Baen Software, and perhaps, a whole new genre of computer game."
