= Hi-Res Computer Golf 2 =

1982 sports video game

- Publisher: Avant-Garde Creations
- Platform: Apple II
- Release: 1982
- Genre: Sports

Hi-Res Computer Golf 2 is a 1982 video game published by Avant-Garde Creations for the Apple II.

== Gameplay ==
Hi-Res Computer Golf 2 is a golf game which has a demonstration course, a practice hole and an 18-hole golf course for beginners.

== Reception ==
Stanley Greenlaw reviewed the game for Computer Gaming World, and stated that "There is no doubt that this is the best golf simulation on the market. Any serious student of the game of golf will find in this game the mental challenges that he faces in the real thing as well as the need for practice to develop a "good swing" which is essential to the actual game."
