= Crypt of Medea =

1984 video game

- Developer: Sir-Tech
- Publisher: Sir-Tech
- Designers: Arthur Britto; Allan Lamb
- Platform: Apple II
- Release: NA: 1984
- Genre: Adventure
- Mode: Single-player

Crypt of Medea is an adventure game written by Arthur Britto and Allan Lamb for the Apple II. It was published by Sir-Tech in 1984. Crypt of Medea makes use of graphics, but is controlled via text commands. The game begins with the player trapped inside Medea's crypt, and the goal is to find a way out. The player must make use of a variety of items and avoid falling victim to enemies and traps.

== Plot ==
The title screen is Medea's only appearance in the game.

After falling unconscious during a late night drive, the unnamed protagonist wakes up in an unfamiliar tomb. This tomb is the crypt of Medea, and it is filled with hostile creatures and deadly traps. The protagonist is forced to explore the crypt in hopes of escaping.

Very little plot is made available to the player during the course of the game. No information is given about how the player ended up in Medea's tomb, and no background information is ever given about Medea. In fact, the protagonist does not ever encounter Medea during the course of the game, and the only mention of her is through an inscription that she wrote.

== Gameplay ==
The game's environment is divided into a series of distinct sections. Each section is represented with a picture and a text description. Objects or creatures that the player can interact with will be visible in the picture and described in the text description. The player can move from one section to another by moving in one of the cardinal directions or occasionally through other actions (such as going up a staircase, going down a hole, or swinging across a ravine).

A composition of two screenshots from the room containing Scum, one of the creatures that inhabits Medea's crypt. The top screen is the picture view, and the bottom screen is the text view.

One of the primary gameplay mechanics in Crypt of Medea is the use of items. Items can be found in many locations throughout the crypt, and the player can carry a limited number of these items at any given time. Often one or more items are the key to solving a puzzle or defeating an enemy that blocks the player's progress. Since the player can only hold a few items at once, inventory management is often a crucial factor to the player's survival.

== Reception ==
At the time of its release, Crypt of Medea was considered a fairly graphic and adult game due to its detailed descriptions of violent deaths. Kim Schuette, author of The Book of Adventure Games, described Crypt of Medea as "a humorless and gruesome game, full of blood, gore, and little else." The cover of the game even describes Crypt of Medea as "an adventure game for the very mature and strong of heart."

Computer Gaming World described Crypt of Medea as "an example of a mature and excellent product" and an "excellently designed game." The magazine praised the game for its controls and for having a level of challenge that is enjoyable for both novice and expert players. St.Game described the game as "something of an Addams Family on disk. It is macabre and witty and stupid and inventive and repetitious and altogether kooky". The magazine criticized the game's typos and poor parser, but stated that it was "full of funny surprises", and recommended it to "beginning adventurers in the family".

== Legacy ==
The game's co-designer, Arthur Britto (credited in-game as Arthur Britto II), later became a co-founder of Ripple Labs and one of the architects of the XRP Ledger. For years, Britto's reclusive nature led to speculation within the cryptocurrency community regarding his existence; his identity was eventually verified by Ripple CTO David Schwartz, who cited Britto's previous career in game development and his specific credits on Crypt of Medea and Rescue Raiders as proof of his background.
