= Blue Powder Grey Smoke =

1986 video game

- Publisher: Gardé Games of Distinction
- Platforms: Apple II, Commodore 64
- Release: 1986
- Genre: Wargame

Blue Powder Grey Smoke is a computer wargame published in 1986 by Gardé Games of Distinction for the Apple II and Commodore 64.

== Gameplay ==
Blue Powder Grey Smoke is a game in which the operational and tactical encounters of the American Civil War are covered.

== Reception ==
Jay C. Selover reviewed the game for Computer Gaming World, and stated that "if the Civil War is a passion for you, you'll just have to swallow hard and accept a few things. If, on the other hand, you would like to see just how easy it is for a crack division of 6000 men to turn into a frightened mob running back to Washington, give this one a look."
