= Red Alert (1981 video game) =

1981 video game

- Developer: Olaf Lubeck
- Publisher: Broderbund Software
- Writer: Olaf Lubeck
- Platform: Apple II
- Release: 1981
- Genre: Shoot 'em up

Red Alert is an Apple II shoot 'em up written by Olaf Lubeck and published by Broderbund in 1981.

== Gameplay ==
Red Alert is a game in which the player defends against attacking aliens.

== Reception ==
Luther Shaw reviewed the game for Computer Gaming World, and stated that "here's another in the long line of aliens-dropping-from-the-skies-being-destroyed-by-your-weapons games. While many versions of the ADFTSBDBYW type of game are very similar to the coin arcade games that they were based upon, this one has a flavor all it's [sic] own."

David Lubar for Creative Computing said that "Some will find it too fast paced, but those who have mastered its predecessors will find a real challenge in Red Alert."
