= Bez-MX =

1981 video game

- Publisher: Bez
- Platform: Apple II
- Release: 1981

Bez-MX is a 1981 video game published by Bez for the Apple II.

== Gameplay ==
Bez-MX is a game in which two players attack each other with missiles and bombers in a hybrid of strategy and arcade game.

== Development and publication ==
John Besnard designed the game based on actual defense projects authorized by President Ronald Reagan, with a release date of December 1981.

== Reception ==
David Hunter reviewed the game for Softalk and said that while the winner is determined by their score, "a low score does not necessarily indicate a badly played game" because he found it "easy to rack up points bombing cities and farms" while destroying "more crucial things like the runway and factory are what help you win the game."

Luther Shaw reviewed the game for Computer Gaming World, and stated that a "pure arcadist" may not enjoy Bez-MX but players who enjoy strategy games "with a little arcade flavor" may find the game "worth considering" based on its price.
