= Crisis Mountain =

1982 video game

- Publishers: Synergistic Software; Creative Software (C64, VIC); Comptiq (FM-7, PC-88)
- Designer: David H. Schroeder
- Programmers: Apple II; David Schroeder; Atari 8-bit Ron Aldrich; Commodore 64; Lloyd D. Ollman Jr.
- Platforms: Apple II, Atari 8-bit, Commodore 64, FM-7, PC-88, VIC-20
- Release: 1982: Apple; 1983: Atari 8-bit 1984: C64, FM-7, PC-88
- Genre: Platform
- Mode: Single-player

Crisis Mountain is a platform game written by David H. Schroeder for the Apple II and published by Synergistic Software in 1982. A port to Atari 8-bit computers was released in 1983. Creative Software published cartridge versions for the Commodore 64 and VIC-20. Ports for the FM-7 and PC-8800 series were from Comptiq.

In Crisis Mountain, the player must defuse bombs left in a lair below a volcano which was abandoned by terrorists. One of the first games with regenerating health, the player is not always killed by an individual mishap. Health—labeled as strength—is shown as a number from 0–3, and after taking damage it slowly increases over time.

Schroeder later developed Dino Eggs for the Apple II.

== Gameplay ==
The player crawled though a tunnel, emerging on the right side of the screen (Atari 8-bit).

The player runs, jumps, kneels, and crawls through a volcanic lair, attempting to reach bombs with timed detonators. Digging up a bomb disables it; digging is faster if the shovel has been found. The remaining time on a disabled bomb is added to a bonus clock. After all bombs have been dealt with, the player is given the accumulated time for a "bonus run" where the goal is to collect valuable items left by the terrorists. There are two separate lairs, and the bombs and collectible items are in random locations each play.

The player starts with a strength of 3 and dies if it falls to 0. Being hit by rocks ejected from lava pits takes away 1 or 2 units, depending on the type of rock. Falling in the lava or being hit by Bertrum the radioactive bat results in immediate death. Strength slowly regenerates over time.

== Development ==
David Schroeder was inspired to write video games after playing Donkey Kong, and Crisis Mountain started out as a minimalist version of that game in Applesoft BASIC. He chose the Apple II, because they were the only computers in the lab at Seattle Central Community College.

In the beginning, I just wanted to get Donkey Kong on the screen. I had no idea I could create anything on the Apple that would be of great interest to many people. Eventually I came around to the idea of putting some of my own ideas into the project, like the time clocks on the bombs and the randomness of objects on the screen, and it was then that Crisis Mountain began to take shape.

Schroeder never owned a computer until he purchased an Apple II Plus with royalties from Crisis Mountain.

== Reception ==
Writing for Compute!, Patrick Parrish found the bat to be a key feature:

the most remarkable graphic element of the game (and the most confounding to any player) is Bertrum, the bat. Bertrum flits about the cavern in a way that resembles a real bat. If a boulder is blasted from a nearby lava pit, Bertrum will dart toward it for a quick inspection, determine the rock is not prey, and fly off to another part of the cave.

But Bertrum is more than just a visual success. His presence adds a degree of chance to the game which makes it faster and more challenging. This dreaded bat has a knack for determining where your player is at any moment in the game. Sometimes, you can avoid Bertrum with a last minute duck or leap.

He concluded by calling it "a superior programining achievement and a thoroughly entertaining game." Softline magazine wrote, "One of the nicest things about Crisis Mountain is that no two games seem alike," and "There are enough things going on all the time that it never becomes boring." In an Electronic Games review, Rick Teverbaugh wrote: "Instead of looking like some uneven lines and ladders, this climbing game has a playfield that actually looks like the inside of a cave"; further, he called the overall visuals "superb". InfoWorld's Essential Guide to Atari Computers cited it as a notable Atari 8-bit arcade game.
