= APBA Major League Players Baseball =

1985 video game

- Developer: Random House
- Publisher: Random House
- Platforms: Apple II, MS-DOS
- Release: July 1985
- Genres: Sports, simulation
- Mode: Single-player

APBA Major League Players Baseball is a sports video game published in 1985 by Random House for Apple II and IBM PC compatibles.

== Gameplay ==
APBA Major League Players Baseball is a game in which all text sports game offers the possibility to play a draft league. Players can create a baseball roster using the names and batting averages of real-life baseball players. Each baseball player and team comes with different offensive and defensive measurements which affect their performance.

== Reception ==
Rick Teverbaugh reviewed the game for Computer Gaming World, and stated that "I like APBA enormously. The action feels like baseball."

Duane E. Widner reviewed the game for Computer Gaming World, and stated that "Unfortunately, the game does not take advantage of all available RAM and accesses the disk drive on every play. That could be a concern over the course of an entire major league season because APBA is fairly slow compared to the others (meaning it takes as long as 30 minutes to complete a game)."

Win Rogers reviewed version 1.5 of the game for Computer Gaming World, and stated that "for what it delivers today, at the price asked, APBA Baseball would not be my first choice for a baseball simulation."
