= Patricia Relf =

American writer

Patricia Relf is an author of books for children and adults. Raised in the U.S., U.K., and Canada, she received an A.B. in English from Cornell University and an M.A. in medieval studies from Western Michigan University. She has worked in publishing, at Random House Books for Young Readers and Sesame Street Magazine, and since 1979 has been a freelance writer of books, educational materials, and computer software. She was a Latin instructor at Western Michigan University. She now lives in the Cleveland area.

In 2017 she published her first book for adults, with co-author D. A. Dirks, To Offer Compassion: A History of the Clergy Consultation Service on Abortion. The group of U.S. religious leaders referred women for safe abortions in the days before Roe v. Wade.

Some of her works for children are:

- Tonka Trucks Night and Day, illus. Tom LaPadula (New York: Scholastic, 2004)
- What's Happening?: A Book of Explanations, illus. Francis H. Schwartz (New York: Mondo Publishing, 2001)
- A Dinosaur Named Sue: The Story of the Colossal Fossil (New York: Scholastic, 2000)
- Tonka Look Inside Trucks, illus. Tom LaPadula (New York: Scholastic, 1999)
- Tonka Big Book of Trucks, illus. Tom LaPadula (New York: Scholastic, 1996)
- The Magic School Bus Hops Home (1995), The Magic School Bus Plants Seeds (1995), The Magic School Bus Gets Eaten (1996), The Magic School Bus Wet All Over (1996), TV book adaptations, based on The Magic School Bus book series by Joanna Cole
- Barnyard Mystery, with Louise Hanavan, illus. Sally Bhandhugravi (Racine, WI: Western Publishing, 1991)
- Hurry! Hurry!, illus. Joel Schick (Racine, WI: Western Publishing, 1991)
- The Big Golden Book of Boats and Ships, illus. Tom LaPadula (Racine, WI: Western Publishing, 1991)
- Muppet Manners, or, The Night Gonzo Gave a Party, illus. Tom Leigh (Racine, WI: Western Publishing, 1986)
- Follow the Zookeeper, illus. Carolyn Bracken (Racine, WI: Western Publishing, 1984)
- Show and Tell, Featuring Jim Henson's Muppets, illus. Tom Cooke (New York: Western Publishing, 1983)
- The Adventures of Superman, illus. Kurt Schaffenberger, David Hunt (New York: Golden Press, 1982)
- The First Day of School, illus. DyAnne Di Salvo (New York: Golden Press, 1981)
- That New Baby!, illus. DyAnne DiSalvo (Racine, WI: Western Publishing, 1980)
