= 3 in 1 College & Pro Football =

1984 sports video game

- Publisher: Lance Haffner Games
- Platforms: Apple II, Atari 8-bit, Commodore 64, MS-DOS
- Release: 1984: Apple II; 1985: C64, MS-DOS; 1987: Atari 8-bit
- Genre: Sports

3 in 1 College & Pro Football is a sports video game published by Lance Haffner Games for the Apple II in 1984. It was ported to the Atari 8-bit computers, Commodore 64, and MS-DOS.

== Gameplay ==
3 in 1 College & Pro Football is a game in which real college and professional players and teams are simulated.

== Reception ==
Johnny L. Wilson reviewed the game for Computer Gaming World, and stated that "With both CQ and 3 IN 1 on my shelf, I never have to worry about the matchups on the tube."

Wyatt Lee reviewed the game for Computer Gaming World, and stated that "Minus yardage must be noted for those who want graphics and further losses must be assessed for the limited play selection. The offensive playbook in this game is limited to 14 plays and the defensive playbook contains only 6 alignments."
