= Crazy Mazey =

1982 maze video game

- Publisher: Datamost
- Platform: Apple II
- Release: 1982
- Genre: Maze

Crazy Mazey is a maze video game for the Apple II published in 1982 by Datamost.

== Gameplay ==
Crazy Mazey is a game in which the player collects money in a series of mazes, avoiding killer cars that try to crash into the player's car.

== Reception ==
Daniel Hockman reviewed the game for Computer Gaming World, and stated that "If you like Head On you will find Crazy Mazey even more enjoyable."
