= Bug Attack =

1982 video game

- Developer: Jim Nitchals
- Publisher: Cavalier Computer
- Platforms: Apple II, Atari 8-bit
- Release: 1981: Apple; 1982: Atari
- Genre: Fixed shooter

Bug Attack is a fixed shooter video game written by Jim Nitchals for the Apple II and published by Cavalier Computer in 1981. A version for Atari 8-bit computers was released in 1982. Bug Attack is based on Atari, Inc.'s Centipede arcade game.

== Gameplay ==
Bug Attack is a game in which the player uses beetles to fight other insects.

== Reception ==
Dave Jones reviewed the game for Computer Gaming World, and stated that "the novel touches of Bug Attack, such as the variety of vegetations and patterns of color, and the intermissions which break up the action between insect waves, served to maintain my interest in the game hour after hour. The author of the game is to be complemented on his packing such a successful combination of imaginative flair and technical expertise into the confines of the Apple II."

Reviewing the Apple II original, Leigh Goldstein wrote in Electronic Games: "Clearly modeled on Atari's coin-op, Centipede, Bug Attack just doesn't offer enough of the features that make Centipede such a great game" and "Bug Attack is dull gaming." She cited Centipede's sound effects and vertical player movement as two elements lacking from Bug Attack.
