= Sumer (video game) =

1981 video game

- Publisher: Crystal Computer
- Platforms: Apple II, Atari 8-bit, Commodore PET, TRS-80
- Release: 1981

Sumer is a 1981 video game published by Crystal Computer for the Apple II, Atari 8-bit computers, Commodore PET, and TRS-80.

== Contents ==
Sumer is a game in which the player tries to establish a kingdom by managing it as it grows.

== Reception ==
Jon Mishcon reviewed Sumer in The Space Gamer No. 40. Mishcon commented that "If you enjoy multiparameter city-state type games then I recommend you avoid this. Buy Santa Paravia instead."
