= Golf's Best: St. Andrews - The Home of Golf =

1986 sports video game

- Publisher: 1 Step Software
- Platforms: Apple II, Commodore 64, MS-DOS
- Release: 1986
- Genre: Sports

Golf's Best: St. Andrews - The Home of Golf is a sports video game published in 1986 by 1 Step Software.

== Gameplay ==
Golf's Best is a game in which the Pinehurst course is included.

== Reception ==
James Delson for Family Computing stated "Not for arcade aficionados who want lots of action, this is a thinking game for sports enthusiasts and serious gamers age 10 and over."

Rick Teverbaugh reviewed the game for Computer Gaming World, and stated that "Golf's Best comes highly recommended from this duffer."

Stephen Banker for Compute! described the game as "Among the cleverest" in arcade-style games based on contests of skill.
