= Adventures in Flesh =

1983 video game

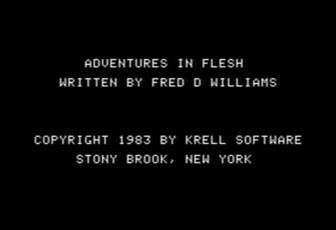
- Title screen
- Publisher: Krell Software
- Designer: Fred D. Williams
- Platform: Apple II
- Release: 1983
- Genre: Interactive fiction
- Mode: Single-player

Adventures in Flesh is a text adventure for the Apple II written by Fred D. Williams and published in 1983 by Krell Software. The player is shrunken and placed inside the body of a patient with multiple illnesses, which they must diagnose in order to score points.

== Gameplay ==
Near the pancreatic duct, the player decides what to do.

Adventures in Flesh is a text adventure in which the player character is miniaturized and injected into a patient who has up to ten disorders. Using the game's manual, a coloring book of human anatomy, the player then must navigate their way through the body to diagnose the patient based on clues and symptoms found in each area of the body, and they score points based on the amount of correct diagnoses. The program has a vocabulary of about 100 words; commands are mostly one or two words long, and the program prompts the player with available commands based on the area they are in at each turn.

== Development ==
Adventures in Flesh was released for the Appli II home computer in 1983. Ports to the Commodore 64 and the Atari 8-bit computers were announced to the press but not realized.

== Reception ==
Softalk briefly reviewed the game, stating that "Adventures in Flesh, by Professor Fred Williams. Reveals the human body in a fascinating and exhilarating adventure game. Program informs players about the details of human anatomy and physiology. Both scientifically serious and enthralling; extensive documentation. It provides hours of instruction and entertainment to ages twelve and up."

Cliff McKnight and Denise McKnight for Personal Computer News said that "Adventures in Flesh is not quite what you might expect. Far from being a rival to the classic Soft Porn Adventure (which is what you'd expect). Adventures in Flesh follows the Fantastic Voyage approach whereby you're in a micro-sub journeying through the human body. It has the added distinction of being medically accurate, and comes supplied with a human anatomy colouring book instead of maps. Another difference with Adventures in Flesh is that the 'solution' changes with each game. You have to diagnose eleven conditions which are randomly selected from a larger set."

In her book Ace it!: Use Your Computer to Improve Your Grades, Kendra Bonnett wrote that the game had "interesting, sometimes funny, and always educational" responses, detail-rich descriptions, and "well done" documentation, though she added that the game's vocabulary "ideally should have been longer."

In a review for Computer Gaming World, J. Robert Beck stated that adults would consider the game "engaging, if unsophisticated compared to the best prose adventures", adding, "Its shortcomings as an adventure program are well offset by its attention to anatomic detail and informative approach to a score of real medical problems." Beck criticized the "sketchy" documentation of the game.

Russ Lockwood for A+ said that "Adventures in Flesh is rather primitive, understanding only 100 words. You issue one-letter commands to indicate directions and two-word commands such as LOOK CELL and BLAST. The intent of the program is to explore the human body. VIRUS to have it perform various activities From time to time, communications from the outside detail external symptoms and help you zero in on disorders. The disorders stand out like neon lights. You need no medical degree to match an internal observation with a disorder, but remember the intent of the program is to explore the human body. The disorders are only there to prod students to continue the game. ... Adventures in Flesh includes a human-anatomy coloring book, which is a helpful guide for introducing human physiology to children. It is also a rudimentary road map of internal systems. All in all, I appreciate Adventures in Flesh but caution that a background in physiology is almost a prerequisite to enjoy the program to its fullest."

Stephen K. Doig for Centre Daily Times wrote that "One of Williams' efforts was an anatomy game for junior-high students modeled on "Fantastic Voyage," the movie in which a submarine run by doctors is reduced to microscopic size and injected into the body of a dying patient. The game, which to Williams' horror was named "Adventures in Flesh" by his publisher, recently was declared one of the top educational programs of 1984. Despite the R-rated title, "Adventures in Flesh" is strictly gee-whiz. When the young student inevitably tries to sneak down the genital artery, the program flashes a note saying "Sorry — you need a note from your parents. As with most of the best computer adventures, such wry humor and unexpected responses are the spice that livens Williams' microcomputer games."
