= Dino Eggs =

1983 video game

- Developer: Micro Fun
- Publisher: Micro Fun
- Designer: David H. Schroeder
- Programmers: Apple II; David Schroeder; Commodore 64; Leonard Bertoni
- Platforms: Apple II, Commodore 64, IBM PC, PC-8800
- Release: 1983
- Genre: Platform
- Mode: Single-player

Dino Eggs is an Apple II platform game designed by David H. Schroeder and published by Micro Fun in 1983. It was ported to the Commodore 64 by Leonard Bertoni and the IBM PC as a self-booting disk. Dino Eggs is Schroeder's second published game, after Crisis Mountain.

== Description ==
The player's objective as "Time Master Tim" (a time traveler) is to collect dinosaur eggs and rescue hatchling dinosaurs while avoiding snakes ("proto-snakes"), gigantic spiders ("proto-spiders"), flying creatures ("proto-pedes"), and the dinosaurs' mother (or "Dino Mom"). Physical contact with any creature will cause the player to be contaminated, and the player will experience "devolution" into a prehistoric spider and lose a life unless the player returns to the "time warp" transport force field before a de-evolution timer runs out. Contamination also destroys eggs and hatchling dinosaurs on contact, reducing the player's score. While within the transport force field, Time Master Tim is safe from all creatures except the Dino Mom.

=== Hazards ===
A player's first hazard is the Dino Mom. The mother dinosaur will try to crush the player by stomping on him. When starting a level, a player has a short period of time to build a fire to keep her away. Building a fire is done by collecting one of several logs present in each level and placing that log on top of another. The player then tries to collect all the eggs and hatched baby dinosaurs before the fire goes out. A fire started at any time will prevent the Dino Mom from stomping. Even if her foot is coming down when a fire begins, she will pull it back up. The player can also attempt to rescue the eggs and baby dinosaurs without fire by avoiding the mother's enormous stomping feet.

On each level, the player is presented with a number of dino eggs, some of which eventually hatch into baby dinosaurs, and all of which must be rescued (in the event they are not killed or destroyed through contamination beforehand) to complete the level. The player does this either by collecting the eggs before they hatch or by placing a time-transporting force field around each baby dinosaur by jumping over them.

Other hazards include snakes, spiders, and centipedes. Snakes appear out of thin air and disappear again after a period of time, and can be avoided by jumping over them. In higher levels, centipedes appear and run below the platforms (above the head of the player, thus making Time Master Tim vulnerable to their attack while jumping, climbing, or falling). In still higher levels, additional centipedes run along each of the four platforms at ground level. Spiders appear at the top of the screen and slide down to the bottom on their web lines. They can be avoided by moving out of their way. If the player walks into their web line, the spider will fall and die. Snakes and centipedes can be killed by dropping boulders, and sometimes they kill themselves by slithering into the player's fire. The player gets one point for each killed spider, snake, or centipede.

Time Master Tim can also be killed by walking into his own fire. If the fire is newly built (energy 9) or about to go out (energy 1), then it can be safely walked upon or through, and will not kill creatures. A fire may be extended, which causes it to start over with energy 9 through two methods: at energy 1 stage, a log can be added to it, and if it is at any other stage, Time Master Tim can jump over the fire while carrying a log and it will extend. Stoking the fire in this manner increases the rate of efficiency of wood consumption by almost fifty percent. Dropping a boulder on the fire causes it to go to energy stage 1 and burn out.

=== Gameplay ===
When the player first arrives on a level, only dino eggs, boulders, and logs are present. The player can collect up to three eggs before having to warp them back to the future, and returning for more. The player may collect "Power," which allows him to carry more than three eggs at a time. If, while carrying eggs, the player comes in contact with a spider, snake, "proto-pede," or hatchling, the eggs become contaminated and are lost.

Once a fire is started, after a period of time, some eggs will hatch. Baby Dinos emerge, and the player must rescue them as well. The player can place force fields around them by jumping over them. This encases the baby Dino in a force field that will transport them back to the future with Time Master Tim when he transports them back on delivery. Up to three baby dinos can be present at any one time. Once they are caged by force fields, the player can warp out to continue playing.

Boulders hang below each platform. When the player rolls a boulder away, they will either discover nothing, some dino eggs, or some bonus feature like a power flower or hidden log. Snakes, spiders, and centipedes hit by the boulder will be smashed to death, and fires will be reduced to energy level 1. Eggs which remain covered by a boulder are neither visible to the player nor subject to hatching.

Baby Dinos face far more hazards than do the nearly invulnerable eggs. First of all, the player's touch will destroy them. Secondly, they must avoid the safety fire, as they may accidentally wander into it and be burned to death. Thirdly, on higher levels, spiders may attempt to abduct them. The death of a Baby Dino by any means results in a deduction of ten points from the player's score. Caged baby dinos will not wander into the fire and are protected from being touched or abducted, but are not immune from falling boulders.

The game consists of four levels of platforms. Via stone ladders, players can climb up to and jump down between gaps in the four platforms (the player can climb down the ladders, but by using the "jump" button, the player will fall down the length of any ladder he is presently climbing; this trick enables the player to descend to the lower platform more rapidly). The bottom platform is continuous with no gaps. The screen is wrap-around: Exiting on one side, the player will enter on the other side of the screen. After collecting one or more eggs and/or detaining one or more Baby Dinos in force fields, the player may "warp out" by delivering the Baby Dinos back to the future. The player will then return to a different location on the same level, and attempt to save more eggs and Baby Dino hatchlings.

The player may leave a level permanently at any time, by warping out while not carrying any eggs, with no Baby Dinos detained. By leaving the level, the player will receive a bonus for rescuing all hatchlings and all eggs and then move on to the next level. However, if the player warps out without collecting all of the Baby Dinos and/or eggs, points will be lost for each Baby Dino egg and live Baby Dino not collected, and the level will need to be repeated. The levels get progressively harder with more snakes and spiders, and fewer logs. Level 9 is the final level; completing this level just re-loads level 9 again. The top level requires the player to build two fires, instead of one, and the bonus for rescuing all of the eggs and hatchling Dinos is raised from ten to fifty points. The sound effects are different for level 9 as well.

Time Master Tim starts with three lives, but if the player attains a sufficient score (approximately 400, the exact score is unknown), they will receive a fourth bonus life.

== Reception ==
Softline stated that Dino Eggs had the same "unmistakable style" as David Schroeder's Crisis Mountain. The magazine called it "a rich game [with] excruciating pleasures", and concluded that Dino Eggs "is just a thumpingly good game and deserves to be a big hit". Ahoy! stated that Dino Eggs is, despite its "pretty tired and familiar" genre, "well-dressed and eager to please" with "first-rate action and a touch of humor".

== Legacy ==
An independently produced remake by Eric Ferrot, Dino Legs, saw a limited release in 2011. Subsequently, Ferrot and original Dino Eggs author David Schroeder collaborated on a full-featured revival of the game entitled Dino Eggs: Rebirth. This version adds new types of boulders, fires, eggs, baby dinos, as well as puzzles, achievements, and an extended story in which Time Master Tim plays alongside his daughter Tamara. The macOS version of Dino Eggs: Rebirth only support 32-bit macOS. The latest macOS version to support Dino Eggs: Rebirth is macOS Mojave
