= Baseball Fanatic =

1986 video game

- Publisher: Performing Arts Software
- Platforms: Apple II, MS-DOS
- Release: 1986
- Genre: Sports

Baseball Fanatic is a sports video game published in 1986 for Apple II and MS-DOS by Performing Arts Software.

== Gameplay ==
Baseball Fanatic is a game in which the player can choose from five different levels of play which affect the offensive production of the players.

== Reception ==
Johnny Wilson reviewed the game for Computer Gaming World, and stated that "Unlike most statistical games, the game plays one pitch at a time, which allows you to mix up your pitches and attempt to fool each batter."
