= Valley of the Minotaur =

1983 video game

- Publisher(s): Zeuss Scientific
- Designer(s): Nicolas van Dyk; Chris M. Evans
- Platform(s): Apple II, Commodore 64, PET, VIC-20
- Release: 1983
- Genre(s): Interactive fiction
- Mode(s): Single-player

Valley of the Minotaur is an interactive fiction game for the Apple II, Commodore PET, VIC-20, and Commodore 64 home computers. It was published by Softalk magazine under the Zeuss Scientific label in 1983. Inspired by Greek mythology, the goal of the game is to collect a set of treasures.

== Gameplay ==
Despite the fact it relies on a simple verb-noun parser, it appears to be inspired by the first of the Zork games, in that the goal is to collect treasures, and to deposit them in a telephone booth (whereas in Zork I: The Great Underground Empire, the goal is to collect treasures to be stored in a trophy case). Additionally, the game features a giant bat, which will pick up the player (without consent), and carry him to various other locations within the game (a feature nearly identical to the giant bat in the first of the Zork trilogy games), as well as travel by boat (which is also featured in Zork I).

Valley of the Minotaur features many aspects which, at that early period in gaming history, were essentially unique to itself, such as an encounter with a tribe of cannibalistic headhunters. In addition to treasure collection, there is a secondary goal, necessary in order to solve the game: The slaying of the dreaded Minotaur.

The game appears to have some bugs, but that is difficult to determine without confirmation from the designer. What appear to have been bugs, may have simply been the off-beat nature of the game itself.

== Development ==
One of the designers, Nicolas Van Dyk, was only 13 years old when designing and publishing this game. In 2010 he looked back at the game as "terrible".

The content, descriptions, and many of the characters and plot were written by Nick's classmate, Christopher M Evans. Christopher Evans also designed the map. Later, he collaborated with Nick Van Dyke on a second text based adventure project, 'Return to the Valley of the Minotaur', which was finished, but not published. The writing and concepts were heavily influenced by popular text based exploration games of the day, including 'Microsoft's Adventure', 'Zork I' and 'II', as well as the maps from 'Wizardry'. Other influences in the writing of 'Valley of the Minotaur' were Dungeons & Dragons, and some of the props from Doctor Who; specifically the telephone booth which appears in the game is a reference to the TARDIS.
