= Word Attack! =

1984 video game

- Developer: Davidson & Associates
- Publishers: Davidson & Associates
- Platforms: Apple II, Atari 8-bit, Commodore 64, MS-DOS
- Release: 1984

Word Attack! is a 1984 educational video game from Davidson & Associates for the Apple II and Atari 8-bit computers. An updated version was released as Word Attack! Plus.

== Gameplay ==
The game consists of a series of language-based drill-and-practice minigames and exercises. In one, the arrow keys tare used to fire at correct answer "targets". The nine programs are aimed at grades 4-12.

== Reception ==
By October 13, 1984, the game had sustained an 11-week streak on the Billboard Charts for Top Educational Computer Software. It re-entered the charts on November 3, 1984 at #9, and again on November 24, 1984 at #7. By June 15, 1985, the game had stayed on the list for a total of 44 weeks, and was currently at #8.

The Computer in Reading and Language Arts criticised the gameplay mechanic of shooting the correct multiple choice answers, finding the graphics out of place for an educational title. InfoWorld deemed it well-organised and flexible, adding that it is an effective teaching tool.
