= Spare Change (video game) =

1983 video game

- Publisher: Broderbund
- Designers: Dan Zeller; Mike Zeller
- Platforms: Apple II, Atari 8-bit, Commodore 64, FM-7, Sharp X1
- Release: 1983: Apple II, Atari 8-bit, C64; 1985: FM-7, Sharp X1
- Genre: Action

Spare Change is an action game designed by Dan and Mike Zeller and published in 1983 by Broderbund for the Apple II and Atari 8-bit computers. A Commodore 64 version was written by Steven Ohmert and released the same year. Ports for FM-7 and Sharp X1 were released in 1985. The difficulty of Spare Change can be customized through seven settings at the "Zerks Control Panel".

== Plot ==
Spare Change is a game in which the player is the owner of the Spare Change Arcade, and is trying to keep two animated characters called Zerks from stealing enough game tokens to retire after escaping from their game.

== Gameplay ==
The player is competing with the Zerks to collect tokens. If the Zerks get five tokens stored in their piggy bank, they win and the game ends. If the player fills the two token bins with a total of ten tokens, then the level advances. The Zerks can be distracted by the jukebox, popcorn machine, and pay phone—each of which is operated with tokens. Activating the jukebox causes the Zerks to dance. The player also needs to keep the arcade operating by refilling the token machines and cash register. When ten tokens are collected, the Zerk Show booth is unlocked, which allows the opportunity to steal tokens from the Zerks.

== Reception ==
David Stone reviewed the game for Computer Gaming World, and stated that "In sum, SCA is an exceptionally good game because it has increasing levels of difficulty, strategy is required to outwit the Zerks, and you are given rewards (the cartoons) for mastering each level." Keith Valenza called it "zany fun" in the August 1984 issue of Antic. He criticized the lack of visual detail in the Zerks and the slow progression of game difficulty, but liked the tuning afforded by the Zerks Control Panel.
