= Breakthrough in the Ardennes =

1984 video game

- Publisher: Strategic Simulations
- Platforms: Apple II, Atari 8-bit, Commodore 64
- Release: 1984
- Genre: Wargame

Breakthrough in the Ardennes is a computer wargame published in 1984 by Strategic Simulations for the Apple II, Atari 8-bit computers, and Commodore 64.

== Gameplay ==
Breakthrough in the Ardennes is a game in which the Battle of the Bulge is simulated.

== Reception ==
Mark Bausman reviewed the game for Computer Gaming World, and stated that "Overall, SSI has brought us another excellent simulation which can provide a real challenge for the computer wargamer."
