= Dragon Fire (video game) =

- Developer: Rodney Nelsen
- Publisher: Level-10
- Platform: Apple II
- Release: 1981
- Genre: CRPG

Dragon Fire is a 1981 video game published by Level-10.

== Gameplay ==
Dragon Fire is a game in which players choose from five fantasy role-playing game character types—Huntress, Warrior, Wizard, Elf, or Dwarf—and embark on a quest to defeat the dragon Salmadon, hidden deep within a ten-level dungeon. The game opens with a high-resolution image of the dragon but shifts to lower-resolution graphics once gameplay begins inside the dungeon. Players progress by battling monsters on each level, gaining experience that can be converted into life points and constitution to strengthen their character. The game includes adjustable difficulty settings, sound effects, a brief narrative, and a save feature. Each playthrough is randomized.

== Reception ==
Rob Greenberg reviewed Dragon Fire for Pegasus magazine and stated that "All-in-all, the game is good, but could use better graphics in the dungeon, and random events to relieve the repetitiveness of fighting monsters."

The Book Of Apple Computer Software 1982 declared that "this is a game that children will enjoy, but which adults may find a bit tedious."

Softalk declared that the game was "Good for beginners."

Your Computer noted that the game was very popular in the USA.

Computer Gaming World praised the game manual for its character profiles and detailed character drawings.
