= Darkhorn: Realm of the Warlords =

1985 video game

- Publisher: Avalon Hill
- Platforms: Apple II, Commodore 64
- Release: 1985
- Genre: Wargame

Darkhorn: Realm of the Warlords is a computer wargame published in 1985 for the Apple II and Commodore 64 by Avalon Hill.

== Gameplay ==
Darkhorn: Realm of the Warlords is a game in which a battle involving four major fantasy races is played out in a real-time wargame for multiple players.

== Reception ==
Johnny L. Wilson reviewed the game for Computer Gaming World, and stated that "Darkhorn is a fast-paced strategy game which is ideal for getting the gang (or the family) together for an evening's entertainment. Challenge, depth, and interest level make this a product to contend with for many years."
