= Gemstone Warrior =

1984 video game

- Developer: Paradigm Creators
- Publisher: Strategic Simulations
- Designers: Peter William Lount; Trouba (Paul) Gossen
- Platforms: Apple II, Atari 8-bit, Commodore 64, Macintosh
- Release: 1984: Apple II; 1985: Atari 8-bit, C64; 1986: Mac
- Genre: Action-adventure
- Mode: Single-player

Gemstone Warrior is a video game written by Canadian developer Paradigm Creators for the Apple II and published by Strategic Simulations in 1984. It is a 2D action-adventure game where the player controls an armored figure searching for treasure and the pieces of the stolen Gemstone. Gemstone Warrior was SSI's first game to sell over 50,000 copies in North America.

The game was ported to the Commodore 64, Atari 8-bit computers, and Macintosh. It was followed by a 1986 sequel, Gemstone Healer, also created by Paradigm.

== Plot ==
The player has to recover the Gemstone, a relic of incredible power forged by the gods and focusing the natural magic of the world. This, they entrusted to Man alone and for a time, there was great prosperity and peace. But the Demons, led by Nicodemius, had managed to boil to the surface and take the Gemstone. Unable to destroy it, Nicodemius fragments it into five pieces and hides them in the Labyrinth, buried deep within the Netherworld. Going into the Netherworld, the protagonist must find and return with the Gemstone.

== Gameplay ==
Gameplay screenshot (Atari 8-bit)

There are three difficulty levels, determining various factors such as the rate at which magic items change their effects and the rate at which more dangerous monsters start appearing.

The game is viewed in a 2D screen displaying the playing area, health, and inventory. The player controls an armored figure that wields a crossbow with a limited supply of bolts that can be replenished by finding more within the dungeon areas. Special "fireballs" can also be launched against foes, although these are limited and are not as common. There are also magical tools and other items that can be collected to provide a variety of benefits such as goblets that can restore health to crystal balls that can annihilate everything on the screen.

The dungeons are filled with a variety of dangers and secret doors. Many brutal monsters fill the caverns ranging from skeletal warriors, exploding gas plants, to nearly invulnerable demons. The player is also able to search the corpses of monsters that remain behind, chests, and coffins for supplies. Monsters do not always respawn in zones, leaving behind only their corpse as a reminder that the player had been there, although some do return to life, such as the skeletons and ghosts.

The goal is to traverse the maze to locate the Labyrinth, find the five pieces of Gemstone within its randomly generated layout, and return to the entrance cavern to escape.

=== Audio ===
The title screen in the Atari 8-bit and Commodore C64 versions uses a variation of J.S. Bach's The Well-Tempered Clavier, Prelude 6 in D Minor BWV 851.
