= Alexander Laufer =

- Education: University of Texas at Austin
- Occupations: Researcher, Consultant, Author, Educator and Speaker

Alexander Laufer is the Director of the Consortium for Project Leadership at the University of Wisconsin–Madison. He is best known for developing a practice-based theory of project management, utilizing the tacit knowledge of competent practitioners from successful organizations.

== Biography ==
Laufer's first eight years of professional life were devoted to the design and implementation of construction projects. After receiving his Doctor of Philosophy in Civil Engineering at University of Texas at Austin, he broadened his scope to the management of technological and organizational projects in a wide range of industries. Through research and consultancy at organizations such as AT&T, Motorola, Procter & Gamble, Skanska, and the United States Air Force, he demonstrated the importance of learning to unlearn the traditional paradigms of project management to better suit today's highly dynamic and competitive world.

His rich academic career includes roles at various universities, including North Carolina State University, University of Maryland, Columbia University (where he served as the Director of the Center of Project Leadership), and the University of Wisconsin. He is currently a chaired professor at the Technion – Israel Institute of Technology (where he also has served as Dean of the Faculty of Civil Engineering). He is also the Director of the Consortium for Project Leadership at the University of Wisconsin.

Laufer has served as the editor-in-chief of the NASA Academy of Program and Project Leadership Magazine (ASK Magazine), and as a member of the advisory board of the NASA Academy of Program and Project Leadership. He is currently associate editor for Innovation and Entrepreneurship of the IEEE Technology and Engineering Management Society's IEEE Engineering Management Review (EMR), and a member of the editorial review board of the Project Management Institute's Project Management Journal.

== Published work ==
Laufer has authored and co-authored six books and numerous research articles on project management. In his books he tackles central issues and dilemmas in the complex reality of today's project environments. By using real stories told by real people he is able to develop and illustrate new project management practices and principles. For example, in his Simultaneous Management (1997) book he demonstrates that successful project managers embrace seemingly contrasting concepts such as project stability and flexibility, proactive and reactive behaviors, and formal and informal processes, thus abandoning the "tyranny of the OR," and embracing the "genius of the AND." In Project Management Success Stories (2000) he and his co-author argue that successful project management requires both leadership and management. In his book Breaking the Code of Project Management (2009) Laufer stresses that project management principles and practices must be adjusted to the unique context of the project and must not follow the prevailing "one best way" approach. In his most recent book Mastering the Leadership Role in Project Management (2012) he demonstrates that projects are plagued with frequent unexpected events. While successful project managers attempt to prevent most unexpected events via planning and control, in order to be effective, they also must cope with many of these events reactively.

== Books ==
- 1994 In Quest of Project Excellence Through Stories with Robert C. Volkman, George W. Davenport, and Susan Terry, Procter & Gamble
- 1997 Simultaneous Management, American Management Association
- 2000 Project Management Success Stories, with Edward J. Hoffman, John Wiley & Sons
- 2005 Shared Voyage: Learning and Unlearning from Remarkable Projects, with Tod Post and Edward J. Hoffman, NASA
- 2009 Breaking the Code of Project Management, Palgrave Macmillan
- 2012 Mastering the Leadership Role in Project Management: Practices that Deliver Remarkable Results, FT Press
