= Bronze Dragon: Conquest of Infinity =

1985 video game

- Developer: Commonwealth Software
- Publisher: Commonwealth Software
- Platform: Apple II
- Release: 1985
- Genre: Role-playing

Bronze Dragon: Conquest of Infinity is a role-playing video game for the Apple II published by Commonwealth Software in 1985.

== Gameplay ==
Bronze Dragon: Conquest of Infinity is a game in which the fantasy adventuring campaign has a detailed background with 13 plots that the player can choose from.

== Development ==
The game was developed by Commonwealth Software, a company based in Indianapolis, Indiana.

== Reception ==
Johnny Wilson reviewed the game for Computer Gaming World, and stated that "For all of its similarity to other systems, BD is an imaginative game with its own character. The variety of attack options, artifacts, monster attacks, and plot twists makes it a distinctive, enjoyable and satisfying game."

The game sold 1,000 copies.
