= Creature Venture =

1980 video game

- Publisher: Highlands Computer Services
- Platform: Apple II
- Release: 1980

Creature Venture is a video game for the Apple II published by Highlands Computer Services in 1980.

== Gameplay ==
Creature Venture is a game in which the player must discover the buried treasure of the haunted Stashbuck mansion. Creature Venture was among the first games that utilized animation as part of adventuring.

== Reception ==
William Zurfluh reviewed the game for Computer Gaming World, and stated that "It will provide many hours of challenging entertainment for even the seasoned expert. In conclusion I would recommend Creature Venture for either the novice or expert. I do not think you will be disappointed."
