= The Mask of the Sun =

1982 video game

- Developer: Ultrasoft
- Publishers: NA: Broderbund; EU: Ariolasoft
- Designers: Alan Clark; Christopher Anson; Margaret Anson
- Platforms: Apple II, Atari 8-bit, Commodore 64
- Release: 1982: Apple; 1984: Atari, C64
- Genres: Interactive fiction, Adventure

The Mask of the Sun is a graphical adventure game for the Apple II developed by Ultrasoft and published in 1982 in North America by Broderbund and in Europe by Ariolasoft. Versions for the Atari 8-bit computers and Commodore 64 were released in 1984.

Gameplay screenshot (Atari 8-bit)

The hero is Mac Steele, an archaeologist who needs to find the Mask of the Sun in order to obtain an antidote to a poison that afflicts him from an artifact that he found. The game mostly takes place in Mexico in the Aztec ruins. Gameplay is text-based; however there are some graphics, including simple animations.

A sequel, The Serpent's Star, was developed by Ultrasoft and published in 1983 by Broderbund.

== Reception ==
Softline in 1983 noted the "innovative" animation and "excellent, detailed" graphics, and called the puzzles "very good". The magazine concluding that "The Mask of the Sun is a very good graphics adventure for the average to good adventurer". Ahoy! in 1984 liked Mask of the Sun's graphics and vocabulary but noted long load times and low level of difficulty, stating that even novice adventurers would be able to finish the game "within a couple of weeks". Antic called Mask of the Sun's graphics "absolutely superb" and the gameplay "excellent".
