= Secret Agent: Mission One =

1983 video game

- Developer: Jor-And
- Publisher: Jor-And
- Release: 1983

Secret Agent: Mission One is a 1983 video game published by Jor-And for Apple II.

== Gameplay ==
Secret Agent is a game in which the player has a limited amount of time to finish the mission.

== Reception ==
James A McPherson reviewed the game for Computer Gaming World, and stated that "The game is very playable. My previous encounters with games of this type sometimes left me stuck in situations that to me had no logical answer in relationship to the game scenario. The answers or actions required in Secret Agent, while hard, are logical to the surroundings."
