= Aquatron (video game) =

1983 video game

- Publisher: Sierra On-Line
- Designer: Justin Gray
- Platforms: Apple II, Atari 8-bit
- Release: 1983
- Genre: Scrolling shooter

Aquatron is a horizontally scrolling shooter written by Justin Gray and published by Sierra On-Line for the Apple II and Atari 8-bit computers in 1983. Aquatron's gameplay is inspired by the 1981 arcade game, Defender.

== Gameplay ==
Gameplay screenshot (Atari 8-bit)

In Aquatron, the player controls a fighter tasked to defend an ocean-covered planet. To do this, a fighter is equipped with a laser gun, proximity missiles, which destroy enemies on contact (or near miss) and a shield (depleted by enemy hits). Ammo and shields are limited, but can be replenished by collecting parachutes dropped by a rigid airship serving as the player's home base. There are nine different enemies, gradually introduced as the player progresses through the 10 different levels. The player's fighter can fly over, but also under the ocean waves, battling the enemy's interceptors or hunting submarines. Similarly to Defender, the game has no definite end and the player is expected to play to achieve the highest score.

== Development ==
Aquatron went through several name changes. Proposed names included: "Sky Diver", "Neptune" and "Juggernaut" but all were rejected due to unclear trademark situation, until Sierra had finally settled on Aquatron. The game came out a couple of months late because of these troubles.

== Reception ==
Softalk reviewed the game in 1984, concluding: "In all, Aquatron isn't the thinking person's arcade game. Just sit down, blast away, and have a ball." 1985 Software Buyer's Guide gave the game "C" rating and noted: "Graphics and sound are very simple. There are a few nice touches and the game is slightly addicting, but it can easily become monotonous."
