= Sams Publishing =

Publisher of technical training books

- Parent company: Pearson Education
- Founded: 1946
- Founder: Howard W. Sams
- Country of origin: United States
- Headquarters location: Carmel, Indiana
- Official website: www.informit.com/sams

Sams Publishing (originally Howard W. Sams & Co.) is an imprint of technical training manuals owned by the global education company Pearson plc.

== History ==
Sams Publishing was founded in 1946 by Howard W. Sams, originally producing radio schematics and repair manuals. It was acquired by ITT in 1967. ITT sold its publishing division in 1985 to Macmillan. In 1987, Sams was split into three divisions, with the computer book division transferred to what later became Macmillan Computer Publishing.

Macmillan was sold in 1991 to Paramount Communications, the parent company of Simon & Schuster, which absorbed the computer publishing division. Simon & Schuster later sold its education division to the imprint's current owner, Pearson.

The computer books division is notable for its "Teach Yourself", "Unleashed" and "21 days" book series.
