= Competition Karate =

1984 video game

- Publisher: Motivated Software
- Platforms: Apple II, Commodore 64
- Release: NA: November 11, 1984
- Genre: Fighting

Competition Karate is a fighting game published by Motivated Software in 1984 for the Apple II and Commodore 64.

== Gameplay ==
Competition Karate is a game in which the player creates a fighter, practices in a dojo, and competes against other fighters.

== Reception ==
David Long reviewed the game for Computer Gaming World, and stated that "I have been involved in the world of judo since 1959, and taekwondo (Korean style of karate) since 1975, while my wife is a two time US champion as well as a Pan Am gold medalist. We both found CK to be truly reflective of the type of tactics which actually win in top level competition; specifically to move a lot, conserve your energy, and make a few good attacks rather than many ineffective ones."

Rick Teverbaugh reviewed the game for Computer Gaming World, calling it "Truly one of computer gaming's classic creations."
