= Theseus and the Minotaur (video game) =

1982 video game

- Cover art by Larry Elmore
- Developer: TSR
- Publisher: TSR
- Platform: Apple II
- Release: 1982
- Mode: Single-player

Theseus and the Minotaur is a 1982 video game published by TSR for the Apple II.

== Gameplay ==
Theseus and the Minotaur is game in which the player must search for princess Ariadne in a maze and bring her out.

== Reception ==
Chris Smith reviewed Theseus and the Minotaur in The Space Gamer No. 57. Smith commented that "Overall, this is a good game. The maze is different every time, though I can find no real difference between a complexity 1 and a complexity 100 game (they give you a choice at the beginning of each game). If the mental challenge of finding the secret doors and mapping out the labyrinth despite the halls of mirrors appeals to you, then I recommend this game."
