= Beneath Apple Manor =

1978 video game

- Developer: Don Worth
- Publishers: The Software Factory; Quality Software
- Platforms: Apple II, Atari 8-bit, IBM PC
- Release: 1978

Beneath Apple Manor is a roguelike game written by Don Worth for the Apple II and published by The Software Factory in 1978. Higher resolution "Special Editions" were released in 1982 and 1983, through Quality Software, for the Apple II and Atari 8-bit computers. It was one of the first video games to use procedural generation.

Today Beneath Apple Manor is usually placed in the "roguelike" genre, but it predates Rogue (created in 1980) by two years. The creator claims that neither he nor the creators of Rogue were aware of the other game. It is notable for being the first commercial role playing game developed and released for a home computer as opposed to a mainframe computer.

== Gameplay ==
The goal of the game is to obtain a Golden Apple on the bottom floor of a dungeon. There are ten rooms per level in the low resolution version, and five rooms per level in the high resolution version. The high-res versions may be played in low-res/text mode, thereby gaining the larger levels.

== Reception ==
Alan Isabelle reviewed Beneath Apple Manor in The Space Gamer No. 35, commenting that "all in all, strengths by far outnumber weaknesses. The game is highly recommended".

Softline in 1983 said of Beneath Apple Manor—Special Edition that "now it's back, and it's better", including improved graphics, varying difficulty levels, and the ability to save progress. The magazine concluded that "BAM is not a game that you will tire of easily ... [it] is for any adventurer, beginner to expert". Computer Gaming World's Scorpia stated in 1991 and 1993 that Beneath Apple Manor was "terribly slow even by the standards of the day, but it was fun nonetheless" and "not bad for a game" designed for a 16K Apple II.
