= TellStar =

- Developer: Scharf Software Systems
- Platform: Apple II, IBM PC
- Type: Simulation
- License: Proprietary

TellStar was the first graphical astronomy program available for personal computers. It was sold from 1980 to 1986 by Scharf Software Services, initially for the Apple II, and later for IBM PC compatibles. The program came in two versions: Level 1, which only plotted the Northern Hemisphere; and Level 2, which could plot the entire celestial sphere.

TellStar could predict the position of celestial objects at any point on Earth and at any time between 0 and 3000AD. The program's database included various celestial objects such as planets, Messier objects, and stars from three different catalogs, totaling over 600 entries.

Plots could be generated in nine directions: N, NE, E, SE, S, SW, W, NW and overhead (a view of the sky upwards). By clicking on a star with a joystick or gamepad, users could access detailed information about each object, including its declination, right ascension, magnitude, rising and setting times in sidereal time and Universal Time, and ranges of the year of visibility.
