= Beany Bopper =

1982 video game

- Developer: Sirius Software
- Publisher: Fox Video Games
- Designer: Mark Turmell
- Programmer: Grady Ward
- Platform: Atari 2600
- Release: NA: September 1982
- Genre: Multidirectional shooter
- Mode: Single-player

Gameplay of Beany Bopper

Beany Bopper is a 1982 multidirectional shooter video game developed by Sirius Software and published by 20th Century-Fox Games for the Atari 2600.

== Gameplay ==
The player controls the "bopper", which is a ball that traverses a playing field with rectangular obstacles in it, and is tasked with preventing "beanies" (so called because they wear propeller beanie hats) from reaching the bottom of the screen. To do this the player must shoot the "beanies" with a stun-gun that can pivot through 360 degrees, and then touch them to capture them. Two play-modes are possible: a first in which the "beanies" can not move through the obstructions, and a second in which they can. Objects fall from the top of the screen that can be collected by the player for additional points. Once sufficient "beanies" have been captured, "Bouncing Orange Eyes" start bouncing around the play-area that must be avoided.

== Development and release ==
Initial design for the game was done by Mark Turmell, then twenty years old. It was programmed by Grady Ward. Launch of the game was accompanied by a television advertising campaign which portrayed a boy being absorbed into the electronic world of the game. The game was part of a series of games launched by 20th Century-Fox for the Atari 2600, which included Deadly Duck, Worm War I, and Fast Eddie.

== Reception ==
Writing in Electronic Fun With Computers and Games in March 1983, Ed Hulse praised the game as offering "a lot of enjoyment" and being very challenging. Writing retrospectively in 2011, Brett Weiss criticised the game as having excessively simplistic graphics and sound and having game-play that was "limited in scope".

=== Reviews ===
- Electronic Fun with Computers & Games
