= Flash Gordon (1983 video game) =

Video game by Fox Video Games

- Atari 2600 box art
- Developer: Sirius Software
- Publishers: Fox Video Games; Sirius Software (computers)
- Designer: David Lubar
- Programmers: David Lubar (Atari 2600); Tom McWilliams (Atari 8-bit); Leonard Bertoni (VIC-20)
- Platforms: Atari 2600, Atari 8-bit computers, Commodore VIC-20
- Release: May 1983
- Genre: Scrolling shooter
- Mode: Single-player

Flash Gordon is a 1983 side-scrolling shooter video game released by Fox Video Games for the Atari 2600. Sirius Software published it as Spider City for the Atari 8-bit computers and the VIC-20. It is loosely based of the 1980 film Flash Gordon, itself based on the Flash Gordon comic strip. It was developed by David Lubar, an employee of Sirius Software. The game features a blend of shoot 'em up and maze game elements. Players navigate a maze on the bottom half of the screen by controlling a space ship on the top half of the screen.

Players control Flash Gordon who flies his space ship into Spider City, a hostile maze filled with enemy Hatching Pods, Patrol Ships and Distruptors. Stranded Spacemen are scattered throughout the maze and can be rescued. The shoot 'em up gameplay frequently garners comparison to Defender. It was Lubar's third game for Fox Video Games, after Worm War I and Fantastic Voyage. Lubar claims that Spider City was inspired by a nickname for Sirius Software's city of origin, Sacramento, California.

Contemporary critics were heavily divided on many aspects of the game. While some thought the graphics were some of the best on the Atari 2600, others thought they were only serviceable. Many applauded the creativity involved in the combination of shooter and maze game elements and several found the on-screen maze to be quite helpful, but others thought the maze took up to much room on screen. Others criticized its lack of clear connection to the Flash Gordon franchise, its lack of replayability, and the oversaturation of Defender-like games in the market. Most recognize it as competently made game with decent graphics, control and gameplay.

== Gameplay ==
Flash Gordon is side-scrolling shooter with a number of similarities to the Williams arcade game Defender. Players control Flash Gordon who is challenged with entering Spider City, destroying Hatching Pods scattered throughout and rescuing any surviving Spacemen. Unlike many similar scrolling shooters, Flash Gordon introduces maze game elements. The screen is split into an shoot 'em up action screen at the top half and a map of Spider City laid out like a maze on the bottom half. Players navigate through the maze by flying towards any side of the screen not blocked by a wall. Hatching Pods, objectives that are scattered about the maze, are marked as dots on the map. Wandering the maze are Disruptors, represented as crosses.

Flash Gordon's ship in orange attempts to shoot at one of the six spider warriors. The maze below shows the current location, other hatching pods, and a disruptor.

Players control a space ship that can turn left and right and move in all directions, and shoot lasers in the horizontal direction they are facing. When a Hatching Pod is reached, six spider warriors hatch and move laterally across the screen. Shooting five of these enemies grants a shield which temporarily provides immunity from damage. Disruptors will send waves of colorful debris shooting at the player from either side. They also produce a plus-shaped Distruptor Generator which freezes the Disruptor in place if successfully shot. Randomly passing Patrol Ships also threaten the player. Friendly survivors, known as Spacemen, float by on occasion and grant points upon contact, though they also lose points if shot. These survivors are not marked on the map.

Once the entire city has been cleared of Hatching Pods, players earn 1,000 points and the city resets, now with faster and more relentless Distruptors. Each completion gets marked on screen and a total of 39 can be displayed at once, though the game does not end at this point. Players start with three lives and earn one more on each map completion.

== Development and release ==
Flash Gordon was created as part of a joint venture between Sirius Software and Fox Video Games. It was programmed by David Lubar, a former editor and Apple II programmer for Creative Computing, who was hired by Sirius for this venture. It was Lubar's third game for Fox, after Worm War I and Fantastic Voyage. Lubar claims the deal allowed them to pick any 20th Century Fox property to turn into a game. Sirius passed on options such as the 1982 film The Entity, of which they got an early preview. The game is based of the film, Flash Gordon, which was released in 1980 by Universal Studios. The film was based on the Flash Gordon comic strip by Alex Raymond, owned by King Features Syndicate and first printed in 1934.

It was first announced at Winter CES in January 1983 for the Atari 2600, Commodore VIC-20 and Atari 400 and 800 computers. All three versions released in May 1983. The computer versions were published by Sirius as Spider City without the Flash Gordon license. Lubar claims the Spider City name came from a nickname for Sacramento, the city Sirius Software was headquartered. The Atari 8-bit and VIC-20 versions were each programmed by Tom McWilliams and Leonard Bertoni, respectively. In March, president of Sirius Jerry Jewell claimed versions for the Atari 5200, Commodore 64, TI 99/4A and "maybe some other versions" were in development. None of these versions are known to exist.

== Reception ==
Electronic Games called Flash Gordon's graphics "serviceable" but hampered by the limitations of the Atari 2600 hardware. They thought "the entertaining play-action" split between the two screens made up for the lack in visuals. The Logical Gamer editor Alan R. Bechtold loved the way "Lubar has combined a space game with a maze game—and made it all work together in a unique way." Bechtold's co-reviewer Mike Wilson thought it played surprisingly well for a licensed game. He thought the on-screen maze was "a great help" but didn't think the graphics were "all that great" and the controls could have been more responsive. Raymond Dimetrosky writing for Video Games Player gave it a B rating. He thought the highlight was the level of complexity saying "as in Defender, there is always about 300 things going on." He thought the on-screen map was "actually useful" and didn't think they compromised the visuals. On the other hand, Ed Husle in Electronic Fun with Computers & Games expressed disdain for the on-screen maze, saying "it takes up too much room, cutting down your ships maneuverability, and really doesn't add much enjoyment to the gameplay."

For Jim Clark of Videogaming and Computer Gaming Illustrated the graphics were "crisp and sleek" and the enemy movements were "unpredictable". E.C. Meade agreed with Clark that it was entertaining but thought the Defender-like gameplay was an overused trope at the time. He also complained that the game had little to do with the Flash Gordon license. In Video Games, Perry Greenberg called it "an exciting, creative, and challenging effort with some of the most colorful and well-designed graphics" on the Atari 2600. He thought it was significantly better than the film it was based on. The Video Game Update thought the graphics were "quite good" but noted a lack in replay value, especially due to the gameplay elements appearing in the same spot in the maze every playthrough. JoyStik magazine thought it was "graphically attractive" but "the dazzle wears thin as the action unfolds."

For the Atari 8-bit version, Electronic Fun with Computers & Games said it was "a challenging game with a little more interest than your basic shoot-em-up." Video Games thought the controls were good but the graphics weren't "anything to write home about" and the sound is "just adequate".

In Brett Wiess's 2007 book Classic Home Video Games, he thought it was a "solid game with respectable graphics" but that having to move close to the sides of the screen to progress in the maze lead to unfair deaths. Retro Gamer in 2022 retrospectively called it a "testiment to [Lubar's] growing confidence with the hardware."

== See also ==
- Buck Rogers: Planet of Zoom, another contemporaneous video game based on a comic strip hero
- List of Atari 2600 games
