= The Challenge of Nexar =

1982 video game

- Official box art
- Developer: Sirius Software
- Publisher: Spectravision
- Programmer: David Lubar
- Platform: Atari 2600
- Release: NA: September 1982; PAL: c. April 1983
- Genre: Tube shooter
- Mode: Single-player

The Challenge of Nexar (stylized as The Challenge of......NEXAR) or simply Nexar, is a 1982 tube shooter video game published by Spectravision for the Atari 2600. It was developed by David Lubar at Sirius Software, who originally designed if for Fox Video Games. The player controls a cursor which shoots in towards enemies that approach from the back of the screen. It is somewhat similar in gameplay to Tempest.

The game was inspired by the work of Lubar's colleague Nasir Gebelli, who created Space Eggs and later Final Fantasy. It released in late 1982 in North America and early 1983 in Europe. An unlicensed reproduction titled Black Hole was also released by Goliath. Critics had mixed opinions, with some praising it highly for its novelty and challenge, but others considering to be "prohibitively difficult", "repetitive", and "unoriginal". Perry Greenberg of Video Games thought it was only an "enjoyable light snack" as opposed to a "full course meal."

== Gameplay ==
The Challenge of Nexar is a tube shooter set in outer space, where the player controls a cursor that can roam freely around the screen and shoot towards enemy ships, called "impact exploding saucers". These enemies start as small dots in the background and then grow larger as they travel towards the player in a pseudo-3D effect. The player's shots gravitate towards the center of screen, requiring the player to carefully position themselves in order to hit enemies. If the cursor makes contact with an enemy ship, a life is lost. There is also a slowly depleting energy meter at the bottom of the screen, which ends the game once depleted (or takes one life on certain settings).

The energy meter can be restored by hitting beacons, shaped as rectangular boxes. Hitting enough beacons progress the player to the next level, with faster saucers and more beacons to destroy. There are 99 levels in all. The first three levels can be accessed immediately with the difficulty switches but the fourth level and on must be accessed through normal gameplay.

== Development & release ==
The Challenge of Nexar was developed by David Lubar, a programmer working for Sirius Software. Sirius had previously developed Atari 2600 games for Fox Video Games, for whom Lubar had developed Worm War I and Fantastic Voyage. According to Lubar, Fox declined to publish Nexar and so Sirius handed the project to Spectravision. Spectravision, which would later be renamed to Spectravideo, had previously published games for the 2600 such as Gangster Alley and Planet Patrol. It would go on to develop the SV-318 home computer, a predecessor the Japanese MSX computer standard.

According to Lubar, Nexar started as an attempt to recreate the Apple II video game Space Eggs created by Sirius colleague Nasir Gebelli, best known for programming the first three Final Fantasy games. Lubar claims Tempest and Star Raiders may also have been inspirations.

Spectravision announced The Challenge of Nexar along with Tape Worm in September 1982. According to The Video Game Update, the game was shipped in late September. A version for Atari 8-bit computers was announced, but no such version is known to exist. Nexar was made available in Europe in early 1983, including the United Kingdom, Germany, and Italy. The European publisher Goliath also published an unlicensed clone of Nexar titled Black Hole in late 1983.

== Reception ==
Electronic Fun with Computers & Games gave The Challenge of Nexar four out of four joysticks, calling it a Tempest-like game that "will knock your socks off." Electronic Games called it "an entirely novel approach to the space shoot-out". They called the graphics "pleasing, if sparse" and the audio "more than adequate." The Video Game Update called it a "very good game" stating "the real fun of this game is the great 3-dimensional effect." UK magazine TV Gamer thought it was "a nice simple game that is both challenging and attractive." Italian magazine Videogiochi thought it was quite original for a space game.

E.C. Meade in Videogaming and Computer Gaming Illustrated disliked it, saying "I can't think of a single aspect of Nexar to recommend." He thought it was too easy, the graphics were "drab", and the theme was "yesterday's soup warmed over." Meade's co-reviewer Jim Clark agreed, saying "there's no sense of place, no personality." Alan R. Bechtold of The Logical Gamer wasn't impressed by the graphics but did think it was "uniquely challenging." Mike Wilson disagreed with Bechtold, believing the gameplay wasn't "all that new or exciting" but the graphics were "a joy to watch."

Perry Greenberg of Video Games thought it was "repetitive" and would have been better with a multiplayer mode. Greenberg said "it's an enjoyable light snack on the ever-expanding video game menu, but as a full course meal, it leaves you hungry for a great deal more." In Germany, Helge Anderson wrote for TeleMatch that it requires very quick reflexes but suffers from a lack of variety. Brett Weiss in 2007 thought the game gets "prohibitively difficult" at times because the cursor can't always move fast enough when there's a lot of enemies on screen.

== See also ==
- List of Atari 2600 games
