= Spy's Demise =

1982 video game

- Publisher: Penguin Software
- Designer: Alan Zeldin
- Platforms: Apple II, Atari 8-bit, Commodore 64, TI-99/4A, Vector-06c
- Release: NA: 1982
- Genre: Action

Spy's Demise is an action game written by Alan Zeldin for the Apple II and published by Penguin Software in 1982. It was ported to the Atari 8-bit computers, Commodore 64, TI-99/4A, and Vector-06c. The game contains a puzzle which at the time of release could be solved for a Spy's Demise T-shirt. According to Antic magazine in June 1984, only four people had solved it. The game was followed by a 1983 sequel, The Spy Strikes Back.

== Gameplay ==
The first level of Spy's Demise consists of twelve floors. The player must cross the series of floors, one at a time, while avoiding seven elevators at varying positions. Being hit by an elevator results in loss of a life. Finishing all floors starts the next level. Floors are gradually removed from level to level making it more difficult for the player to avoid the elevators. Ports of the game had a music loop of renditions of Eastern European classical and folk tunes, including:

- Hungarian Dance #5
- The Comedians "Gallop"
- "Katyusha"
- The Nutcracker "Trepak"

The puzzle consisted of a nine-line cryptogram, one line of which was displayed after completing the corresponding level. It revealed a phone number to call, and a person's name for whom to ask. There is a tenth line in the programming code which is never displayed in the game itself. That tenth line gives a code word that is to be spoken to the person who answers the phone, but it was a trap planted by Penguin Software to foil anyone who tried to solve the puzzle by scanning the program code instead of playing through the end of the game!

== Development ==
The original title of the game was Poof!, with identical gameplay. For marketing reasons, it was decided to change the graphics to fit a spy theme and Mary Locke at Penguin Software created the animated spy character. The Spy's Demise title was inspired by a drink name at a spy-themed bar in Milwaukee named The Safe House.

== Reception ==
In the July/August 1983 "New Products" column of Atari computer magazine ANALOG Computing, the author wrote "SPY'S DEMISE is the winner of this issue's 'Potato Chip' award. You can't stop playing it."

In 1984 Softline readers named the game the eighth-worst Atari program of 1983, tied with Gwendolyn.

== Legacy ==
The 1983 sequel, The Spy Strikes Back, was not written by Zeldin, but Penguin Software founder Mark Pelczarski and Robert Hardy. Both games, along with Penguin's Thunderbombs, were later released together as Arcade Album #1 for the Apple II, Atari 8-bit, and Commodore 64.

In the UK, the game and the sequel were released together in a single package in 1985. U.S. Gold published the compilation on its "Electric Dreams" label (not to be confused with Electric Dreams Software) for the Commodore 64 and Atari 8-bit computers. Reviewers for Zzap!64 magazine were extremely critical of the games and awarded the release an overall score of 10%.

A clone of Spy's Demise was printed in as a type-in program in Atari 8-bit computer magazine ANALOG Computing as Elevator Repairman (1985). Another clone is Elevator (1986) by David Bayliss for MS-DOS.
