= Repton (1983 video game) =

- Developer: Sirius Software
- Publisher: Sirius Software
- Programmers: Dan Thompson; Andy Kaluzniacki
- Platforms: Apple II, Atari 8-bit, Commodore 64
- Release: NA: 1983
- Genre: Scrolling shooter
- Mode: Single-player

Repton is a Defender-inspired horizontally scrolling shooter written by Dan Thompson and Andy Kaluzniacki for the Apple II and published by Sirius Software in 1983. It was ported to the Atari 8-bit computers and Commodore 64.

== Gameplay ==
The player controls a fighter ship sent to stop a fleet of invading aliens from building an attack base on the planet Repton. The ship is equipped with lasers and a limited number of nukes that can destroy all enemies on the screen. The player can use an invulnerable shield for defense, but cannot steer or fire while it is up. If the player puts the shield up while moving, the ship will coast to a stop. In addition, a radar screen indicates the location of enemies on the planet surface.

Each level of the game is played in two parts. During the surface attack, the player fights enemies in order to delay the construction of the base. "Warning" messages indicate that a fresh wave of enemies is arriving, while an "Alert" tells of an attempt to siphon energy from the planet. If the player can fly through the enemy's energy beam in time, then pass through a charging station, the energy will be returned to the planet; otherwise, it will go into building the base.

Once the base is completed, the planet's defenses trigger a bomb that destroys the entire surface and the action shifts to the caverns, where the radar does not function. Here, the player must dodge enemy attacks and eventually destroy the base's power core, after which the next level begins with increased difficulty.

== Reception ==
Softline in 1983 called Repton "the latest in ultra-fast action arcade games", praising its "faultless animation". Video reviewed the Apple II version of the game in its "Arcade Alley" column where it was described as "pure excitement from start to finish", noting that extra features enhance gaming experience. Reviewers praised the game's "finely detailed graphics" and noted that "action is [its] hallmark". Ahoy! in 1984 gave Repton grades of B for graphics and C+ for gameplay. The magazine stated that the game "offered nothing new", and to only buy it if looking for "a definitive Defender-like shoot-em-up". Jerry Pournelle wrote in BYTE that despite disliking the Apple version of Repton, "I find myself wasting more time than I should on the Atari version". The Commodore 64 Home Companion stated that the game had "excellent visuals". Repton received a Certificate of Merit in the "1984 Computer Game of the Year" category at the 5th annual Arkie Awards.

== Legacy ==
In 2011, Kaluzniacki released a version of Repton for the iPhone. It uses high-resolution visuals instead of pixel art, which Jeff Minter criticized for losing the flavor of the original.
