= Fantastic Voyage (video game) =

1982 video game

- Developers: Sirius Software; Taito (arcade)
- Publishers: Fox Video Games; Taito (arcade)
- Programmer: David Lubar
- Platforms: Atari 2600, Atari 8-bit computers, arcade
- Release: Atari 2600: December 1982; Arcade: JP: April 1983
- Genre: Scrolling shooter
- Modes: Single-player, multiplayer (arcade)

Fantastic Voyage is a 1982 scrolling shooter video game developed by Sirius Software and published by Fox Video Games. It was released for the Atari 2600 in December 1982 and later for the Atari 8-bit computer line. The game is based on the 1966 film Fantastic Voyage, and involves the player piloting a miniature submarine through the bloodstream to rescue a patient with a life-threatening blood clot.

Programmed by David Lubar, it was his second game he made for the Atari 2600 during his tenure at Sirius Software following Worm War I (1982). As Sirious had a working relationship with Fox Video Games, it had its programmers develop video game adaptations of various films in their catalogue, which led to Lubar choosing Fantastic Voyage.

On its release, reviews in The Video Game Update and Videogaming Illustrated found the gameplay and graphics mediocre, while other reviews in Videogaming Illustrated and Video Games said the game did offer some unique elements and themes to the shoot'em up genre.

== Gameplay ==
Fantastic Voyage on the Atari 2600

Fantastic Voyage is a vertically scrolling shoot'em up game. In the game, the player pilots a miniturized submarine equipped with a laser ray through the bloodstream of a patient with a life-threatening blood clot.

The game is played under a time limit displayed on the lower left portion of the screen. Also displayed at the bottom is the patient's heart monitor, indicating the strength of the patient's heartbeat. A number showing the number of patients saved is also displayed.

As the player navigates the bloodstream, they must shoot or dodge various objects that cause different gameplay effects. These include enzymes, which, when shot, release healing properties and antibodies, which are released when your craft touches the artery wall and can be destroyed as they sap the patient's strength. Other objects should not be shot, such as blood cells and clotlets, which are indestructible. In the final phase, the player must fire fifteen shots into the blood clot before crashing into it, which is fatal to the patient.

== Development ==
Fantasic Voyage was programmed by David Lubar. After finishing college, Lubar tried a career in writing and got a story accepted at Creative Computing magazine in the late 1970s. On picking up the magazine, he became immersed in computer programming and bought an Apple II in 1978 and began learning assembly language. By 1980, he became an associate editor at Creative Computing. While working for the publication, Lubar continued to program and met with Mark Pelczarski at Penguin Software and contributed code for their program The Complete Graphics System. This led Pelczarski to recommend him to Sirius Software when they asked for programmers to work on Atari 2600 games.

Lubar accepted their offer. Sirius at the time had a joint venture with Fox Video Games, a subsidiary of 20th Century Fox which started in April 1982. Their contract included Sirius to develop 12 video games for Fox for the Atari 2600. Part of Fox Video Games' initial plan for game development was to adopt titles from their film catalogue. Fox Video Games president Frank O'Connell explained that brand awareness was key for the company, saying that developing a game yourself that nobody knew anything about had a distributor starting at zero, but having a known television and film properties allowed the company to know their product's audience. Lubar developed his first game for Fox titled Worm War I (1982), which was followed by Fantastic Voyage.

Fantastic Voyage is based on the film Fantastic Voyage (1966). Lubar said that with the deal with Fox Video Games, they could develop any of their films to adapt into a game. Lubar said that "being a science fiction nerd, Fantastic Voyage was a no-brainer." Lubar said that 20th Century Fox would sometimes let them watch their films before they came out to see if they wanted to make a game for them. Lubar recalled watching The Entity (1982) and said he passed on adapting it.

== Release and reception ==
Reception

Review scores
Publication	Score
AllGame	2.5/5
Electronic Fun with Computers & Games	2.5/4
Retro Gamer	4/5

Fantastic Voyage was released for the Atari 2600 in December 1982. It was the eighth game Fox Video Games released for the console and the third film tie-in that Fox Video Games released following Megaforce (1982) and Alien (1982). A version of the game was released later for Atari's line of 8-bit computers. Taito developed an arcade version titled Bio-Attack, which was released only in Japan in April 1983 under license from Fox Video Games. It features more advanced graphics through the Taito SJ System hardware and an exclusive boss fight at the end of each level. In Japan, Game Machine listed Bio-Attack on their June 1, 1983 issue as being the seventeenth most-successful table arcade unit of the month.

While Mark Trost of Electronic Fun with Computers & Games said that Fantastic Voyage had the screen "aglow with eye-grabbing images", other reviewers, such as The Video Game Update and E.C. Meade of Videogaming Illustrated said the graphics were mediocre. Meade continued that the game played similarly to Activision's River Raid (1982) but that Activision's game "creates a sense of flight and the ambiance of battle", while Fantastic Voyage was mediocre in terms of gameplay. Trost said the game did not realize its potential, finding elements like the timer as not being clear on how much time remains or how much damage the player gets from hitting an enemy. Jim Clarke of the same publication echoed that the graphics were "admittedly sparse", but said that there were some touches that added flavor to the game, such as the heart monitor and great sound effects, which made it "a very worthwhile variation on the faster, mindless shoot-'em-ups" on the market. A reviewer in The Video Game Update said that Fox Video Games should be commended for attempting a game whose scenario was beyond the typical scenarios in shoot 'em up games, while ultimately not recommending it as it was "just plain boring once you've played it a few times." Reviewing the version for Atari's home computers, Dawn Gordon and Dan Persons of Video Games said that Fantastic Voyage has enough original elements to make it stand on its own as an entertaining shoot-'em-up.

Gordon and Persons said that the graphics and sound for the Atari 8-bit computer version were similar to those of the original game, finding that they "could have been done with a lot more flair." In a retrospective review, Dan Whitehead of Retro Gamer said the game was not an entirely accurate representation of the film, but found its features like collapsing tunnels and objects breaking apart as highlights. He summarized that "River Raid did the vertical scrolling thing better, but this is more than respectable." Brett Alan Weiss, writing for Allgame, also found the game similar to River Raid but without key elements such as the "colorful graphics, fun gameplay and the ever-present fuel concerns." Weiss concluded that there was plenty of challenge in the game, it was not enough "way of sheer shoot-'em-up entertainment."

== Aftermath ==
Following Fantastic Voyage, Lubar released another film tie-in with Flash Gordon (1983) and original games with SpaceMaster X-7 (1983). Fox Video Games closed the year after Fantastic Voyage was released due to events surrounding the video game crash of 1983. David Lubar summarized the end of Sirius in an interview published in 2015, saying "I'm sorry they went out of business, but it just seemed inevitable, given the way they handled the finances." The United Kingdom-based publisher Quicksilva would obtain the rights for the game adaptations of the Fantastic Voyage film, and renamed their previously released title Blood 'N' Guts as Fantastic Voyage for the ZX Spectrum in the 1980s.

Following the closure of Fox Video Games, Lubar went to work for Activision and later for Absolute Entertainment. He first left the video game industry following this, explaining that "they brought in managers and everything went to hell. People that have never played a game, never designed a game, never even managed a project... that struck my "I don't play nice with others' bone." He returned to writing full-time in 1995 and published 50 books by 2022. He returned to programming briefly towards the end of the decade to make a port of Frogger for the Game Boy and produce Frogger 2 for the Game Boy Color.

== See also ==
- List of Atari 2600 games
- List of video games based on films
