= Escape from Rungistan =

1982 video game

- Developer: Sirius Software
- Publisher: Sirius Software
- Designer: Bob Blauschild
- Platforms: Apple II, PC-88, FM-7
- Release: NA: 1982
- Genre: Interactive fiction
- Mode: Single-player

Escape from Rungistan is an interactive fiction video game written by Bob Blauschild for the Apple II and released by Sirius Software in 1982. Blauschild also wrote Critical Mass which was published by Sirius in 1983.

== Plot ==
The instructions at the opening of the game describe the situation:

You are about to cross the border into the country of Rungistan in Central Africa. They don't like foreigners, especially ones that play on computers! If you cross the border they will probably throw you in jail and shoot you at sunrise. Your only hope in that case would be to escape from the cell and make it back across the border.

== Gameplay ==
Rungistan combines graphical elements with text-based commands. The game begins with the player sitting in a jail cell and one is asked to enter a command. In certain situations, the player is required to perform a certain action before the time runs out, such as defusing a bomb. It also includes arcade-like sequences, such as skiing down a hill and avoiding trees.

== Reception ==
Softline in 1982 liked the "precise, colorful graphics", animated arcade sequences, and built-in hints, and stated that "The puzzles are otherwise challenging enough for the average adventurer".
