= Graphics Magician =

The Graphics Magician, subtitled Picture Painter, is a utility for drawing bitmapped images and playing them back from user-developed programs. It was written for the Apple II by Penguin Software founder Mark Pelczarski and Jon Niedfeldt, and published by Penguin Software in 1982. It was ported to the Atari 8-bit computers, Commodore 64, and IBM PC. The routines for playing back graphics and animation were written by David Lubar and Chris Jochumson. Graphics Magician doesn't store images in their final form, but records the commands used to create them using a "tiny vector graphics-like language." The software plays them back to re-create the image. Images can be layered based on when each shape is drawn.

The Graphics Magician was used to generate images for some commercial graphic adventures of the 8-bit computer era, including Dragon's Keep from Sierra On-Line, Crypt of Medea from Sir-Tech, and Penguin's own The Quest. The playback routines were free to use in commercial products, but required a license from Penguin Software. The Dragon's Keep manual specifically gives credit to Graphics Magician and the authors of the graphics functions. The PC version produces graphics files that are not compatible with the Apple II version.

== History ==
Pelczarski worked as a high school and college professor in computer science. When he got the Apple II, he decided to see what could be done with the new color display. At first, his small skills were swapped for computer supplies at various shops. In 1979 he started selling a precursor to The Graphics Magician called Magic Paintbrush. This was followed by The Complete Graphics System, The Complete Graphics System II, and finally The Graphics Magician.

While the Apple II version was widely used, fewer than 1000 copies of the PC version were reportedly produced. Penguin's own PC software used graphics created with the Apple II version of Graphics Magician.

== Reception ==
BYTE in 1982 said that Graphics Magician would appeal to both new and experienced Apple users, and favorably noted the lack of copy protection.
