= Substation (disambiguation) =

A substation is a part of an electrical generation, transmission, and distribution system. Substation may also refer to:

- Traction substation, a type of electrical substation
- Police substation, a mini police station with limited services
- The Substation, a Singaporean contemporary arts centre
- SubStation Alpha, a subtitle file format
- Substation (video game), a 1995 first-person shooter for the Atari STe
