= Sneakers (1981 video game) =

1981 video game

- Publisher: Sirius Software
- Designer: Mark Turmell
- Programmers: Apple II; Mark Turmell; Atari 8-bit Hunter Hancock
- Platforms: Apple II, Atari 8-bit
- Release: July 1981
- Genre: Fixed shooter
- Mode: Single-player

Sneakers is a fixed shooter video game for the Apple II written by Mark Turmell and published by Sirius Software in 1981. A version for Atari 8-bit computers was released the same year. Sneakers was Turmell's first published game. He was later the lead designer and programmer of 1993's NBA Jam.

== Gameplay ==
The player uses either the paddles or the keyboard to move a ship left or right across the bottom of the screen while shooting or evading enemies. If an enemy destroys the ship, a much larger mothership will descend and put a new one into play. The player begins with four ships in reserve and receives an additional one for each level completed. There are eight kinds of enemy the player must face, each of which attacks in a wave of its own with a unique strategy. After completing all eight waves, play proceeds to the next level in which the same enemies attack again, but in greater numbers or more challenging ways.

Wave 1: Sneakers

The first wave pits the player against the innocuous "Sneakers", smiling, white-legged creatures that fly randomly around the screen. If one collides with the ship it will destroy it, but otherwise they do not pursue or fire upon it. Sneakers are blue when flying freely, but turn red when sitting on the ground or traveling vertically. Each is worth 10 points.

Wave 2: Cyclops

The Cyclops are small red, blue and white craft with a single black "eye" that sweeps back and forth. They travel straight across the screen from left to right, and whenever fired upon accelerate and descend slightly. Missing too many shots will bring them low enough that they collide with the ship. Cyclops are worth 25 points.

Wave 3: Saucers

Resembling flying saucers, these ships drop a steady rain of bombs as they fly back and forth. When destroyed, they sometimes release a larger, more powerful bomb that can unexpectedly veer diagonally. Saucers are 30 points each.

Wave 4: Fangs

The insect-like "Fangs" dance back and forth in formation near the top of the screen, and will sometimes morph into an indestructible, falling spiked form. Fangs are 35 points.

Wave 5: H-Wings

The TIE fighter-ish ships in this wave don't fire, but move quickly and are difficult to avoid. Destroying one earns the player 50 points. These enemies were named for the H Wing of Delta College where creator Mark Turmell attended computer classes.

Wave 6: Meteors

The player moves through a dense field of meteoroids and occasional asteroids. These can be shot at and destroyed, but most must simply be avoided. If the player destroys enough of the objects in this wave, the game may award bonus points.

Wave 7: Scrambles

Scrambles are colorful triangular objects that fall toward the ship. Each one must be shot and deflected several times to complete the wave.

Wave 8: Scrubs

The final wave consists of diagonally-moving formations of small blue objects called "Scrubs". Shooting a Scrub will cause it to break formation and slowly fall. Shooting it again in this form earns extra points, but causes it to fall much more quickly.

== Development ==
Sneakers was Mark Turmell's first game, begun shortly after teaching himself 6502 assembly language on an Apple II. He recounted that making the game "took me about eight months. I sent it to a company in California, who bought it and started sending me royalty checks a month later. Here I was, it's 1980 and I'm only 17, getting checks for $10,000 a month!"

== Reception ==
Within two months after its July 1981 release Sirius had sold 10,000 copies, and by October Sneakers was ninth on the Softalk Top Thirty list.

Softline in 1981 liked the graphics and gameplay. David H. Ahl of Creative Computing Video & Arcade Games in 1983 said that even those who found the game difficult enjoyed it. The Book of Atari Software 1983 called the game "highly entertaining" in a B+ review.

Sneakers received a Certificate of Merit in the category of "Most Humorous Home Arcade Game" at the 4th annual Arkie Awards.
