= Transylvania (video game) =

1982 video game

- Commodore 64 cover art
- Publisher: Penguin Software
- Designer: Antonio Antiochia
- Platforms: Apple II, Atari 8-bit, Commodore 64, Mac, Amiga, Atari ST, MS-DOS, iOS
- Release: Apple II, Atari 8-bit, C64: WW: 1982; Mac: WW: 1984; Amiga, ST, MS-DOS: WW: 1985
- Genre: Adventure
- Modes: Single-player, multiplayer

Transylvania is an adventure video game published by Penguin Software. It was released for the Apple II in 1982 followed by ports to the Atari 8-bit computers and Commodore 64. A Mac conversion was published in 1984, then versions for the Amiga, Atari ST, and MS-DOS in 1985.

== Plot ==
Transylvania is a game in which the player takes on a quest to rescue Princess Sabrina, and must travel the countryside where a werewolf, a vampire, a prankster goblin, a witch, and an alien spaceship roam. The game gives the player a time limit (the player receives a note early in the game which reads, "Sabrina dies at dawn"), and the Princess is held in a coffin located in the castle tower.

== Reception ==
Gregg Williams reviewed the game for Computer Gaming World, and stated that "I refer to the Atari 520 ST version of Polarware's Transylvania. The story line is fine, but the game makes almost no use of the ST's extra colors, resolution, or speed."

The first game in the Transylvania series was well received, appearing in the Billboard and Softalk best-sellers charts and in The Wall Street Journal in a list of best-selling software. The Mac version sold over 15,000 copies within two months of release in 1984, accounting for over a fifth of all Mac owners at the time.

It received a Certificate of Merit in the category of "1984 Best Computer Game Audio-Visual Effects" at the 5th annual Arkie Awards. It is considered one of the best entries in the adventure game genre. ANALOG Computing disliked the Atari ST versions of the first and second games, stating that "There just wasn't much of a story line" and that the ideal player age was a young teenager, not an adult. Despite this, however, because of their low price and "excellent" production values, graphics, and parser, the magazine recommended the games for those seeking graphic adventures for the ST.

== Legacy ==
An iPhone version of Transylvania was released on October 30, 2009 under the name Transylvania Adventure with retro-styled graphics.
