= The Coveted Mirror =

1983 video game

- Developers: Eagle Berns; Holly Thomason
- Publisher: Penguin Software
- Platform: Apple II
- Release: 1983
- Genre: Adventure
- Mode: Single-player

The Coveted Mirror is a graphic adventure for the Apple II published in 1983 by Penguin Software. It was created by Eagle Berns and Holly Thomason. A version with a more advanced text parser was released in 1986 and ported to additional systems.

== Plot ==
The land of Starbury was taken over by Voar the evil. During his grasp for power, Voar tried to seize the magic mirror but broke it into five pieces; luckily, he was only able to grab four of the pieces. it is up to you, the hero, to find the fifth and final piece in order to break Voar's rule and save the people of Starbury.

== Gameplay ==
The interior of the prison tower with the command prompt below it.

The player types textual commands at the bottom of the screen below an image of the current location.

The Coveted Mirror involves frequent, timed escapes from the jail tower. Within a limited timeframe, indicated by an hourglass, the player must search the castle, find objects, and talk to people, and return to the cell by the time the jailer makes his rounds. This timed element adds another dimension to the exploration and puzzle solving.

The original release includes action sequences such as a jousting game and a fishing game. The later Comprehend version, released in 1986, replaces the two-word parser with a full-sentence parser, but replaced the action elements with puzzles.

== Reception ==
Softline in 1984 called The Coveted Mirror "a great balance of magic and mystery". The magazine liked the "intelligent" parser with built-in hints and the "remarkably well done yet nonviolent" arcade sequences, and concluded that it "is probably the best graphic adventure of the year". Creative Computing praised the game's graphics, and approved of the arcade segments as "a refreshing break from 'adventure monotony'". The magazine concluded that The Coveted Mirror "is one of the best graphics adventures" for Apple.

== See also ==
- List of graphic adventure games
