= The Earth Dies Screaming (video game) =

1983 video game

- Developer: Sirius Software
- Publishers: Sirius Software; Fox Video Games
- Designer: Dan Thompson
- Platforms: Atari 2600, Atari 8-bit, VIC-20
- Release: 1983
- Genre: Shoot 'em up
- Mode: Single-player

The Earth Dies Screaming is a space-themed shoot 'em up developed by Sirius Software and published in 1983 by Fox Video Games based on the 1964 movie The Earth Dies Screaming, which was produced by 20th Century Fox. Gameplay involves shooting at incoming enemy spaceships before they attack the player's shapeship or the Earth itself. The game was released under the name Final Orbit for the VIC-20 and Atari 8-bit computers.

== Gameplay ==
Atari 2600 gameplay screenshot

The Earth Dies Screaming is a first-person space shooter where the player attacks incoming enemy spaceships. Players move a targeting reticle around the screen, trying to destroy incoming ships before they fire missiles at the player's ship. While shooting, the bottom of the screen shows a rotating Earth which gives "a pretty good illusion of 3-D motion". Enemy ships can also directly target the Earth.

Gameplay was compared to a first-person version of Missile Command.

== Development ==
The Earth Dies Screaming is loosely based on the 1964 film of the same name, which was released by 20th Century Fox. The studio partnered with Sirius Software to release games under its Fox Video Games imprint. The game was considered as having "absolutely nothing to do with the plot of the film", and was described as part of a trend for 20th Century Fox to recover investment from "underperforming films".

== Release ==
The game was published for the Atari 2600 by Fox Video Games in 1983. Versions for the VIC-20 were renamed to Final Orbit and published by Sirius Software.

== Reception ==
Multiple reviews commented on the uniqueness of the game's name, but the Fort Worth Star-Telegram called the name a "turn-off".

In a retrospective review, VideoGameCritic.com praised the graphics but found the game confusing. The game's graphics were considered a "visual upgrade" from the 1977 game Star Ship. GameSpot called the game a "slow and tedious experience", preferring the similarly themed games of Star Raiders and Starmaster.
