= Wayout =

1982 video game

- Developer: Sirius Software
- Publisher: Sirius Software
- Designer: Paul Allen Edelstein
- Platforms: Atari 8-bit, Apple II, Commodore 64
- Release: 1982: Apple II, Atari 8-bit 1983: C64
- Genres: Maze
- Mode: Single-player

Wayout is a 3D first-person perspective video game programmed by Paul Allen Edelstein and published for the Atari 8-bit computers in 1982. It was released for the Apple II and Commodore 64 in 1983. Wayout is among the first maze games to offer full 360 degree 3D perspective and movement, and its graphics were considered state-of-the-art upon its release. There were many pseudo-3D maze games at the time (such as 3D Monster Maze, Phantom Slayer, and 3-Demon), but they used a fixed perspective and limited the player to four orientations.

Capture the Flag was published as a follow-up in 1983. It allows two players to compete at once with a split-screen view and adds dynamic music.

== Gameplay ==
The view from inside the maze

The game can be played with either a joystick, paddles or the keyboard, allowing the player to move forward and turn left or right (but not backwards).

The player is trapped inside one of 26 mazes and must find the exit with the use of a compass and a map-making kit. The game automatically maps the areas that the player explores and records how many movement units the player uses up, saving the best scores to the game disk.

There is also a computer controlled opponent called the Cleptangle who appears as a spinning rectangular form which moves around the maze and will render the player's compass and mapmaker useless by stealing them if it comes into contact with the player.

In addition, there is a wind within each maze, which blows in a constant direction, and is visualized by the presence of fireflies (represented by single pixels, moving through the maze). The wind can sometimes be too strong for the player to push against, but it can also help the player locate the exit of the maze.

In the lower portion of the screen is a top-down, 2D view, of the maze the player inhabits and draws itself as the player moves around, in a very similar way to the automap feature which became prevalent in many later first-person shooters such as Doom.

== Reception ==
Creative Computing in 1983 described Wayout as "deliciously addictive"; reviewer Chris Vogeli admitted to being frustrated until he realised the exit could be anywhere on the map, and not just at the edge. Antic's David Duberman wrote, "The graphics that appear before you as you move through the maze are more life-like and dramatic than I have ever seen. The 3-D animation... makes this game the last word in alternate-reality simulation". Softline stated that Wayout "features smooth-scrolling, truly three-dimensional mazes ... to torture your mind", and was "not recommended for vertigo sufferers". In a review for ANALOG Computing, Brian Moriarty concluded, "Paul Edelstein deserves stardom for his masterful programming effort. When I'm showing off my ATARI to friends, I don't automatically reach for Star Raiders any more".

Allen Doum of Computer Gaming World wrote that "Wayout has the best 'attract mode' I've ever seen. The program actually solves the INTRO maze, while demonstrating all game features except the reference points". Electronic Fun with Computers & Games described Wayout as having "superb 3-D graphics", but criticised it for the lack of variety in the colors of each maze, which could lead the player to become "very disoriented". Ahoy!'s reviewer stated that "Maze games generally leave me cold. To my surprise, I found Wayout a complete delight" and superior to Tunnel Runner and Escape from the Mindmaster. He concluded, "Maze game fans—pounce on this one".

== See also ==
- MIDI Maze
