= Stratovox =

1980 video game

- Developer(s): Sun Electronics
- Publisher(s): JP: Sun Electronics; NA: Taito
- Platform(s): Arcade
- Release: JP: May 1980; WW: August 1980
- Genre(s): Fixed shooter
- Mode(s): Single-player

Stratovox, known in Japan as Speak & Rescue (スピーク&レスキュー), is a 1980 fixed shooter arcade game developed and published in Japan by Sun Electronics and released in North America by Taito. It is the first video game with voice synthesis. The player must shoot UFOs attempting to kidnap astronauts that appear on the right side of the screen. If all astronauts are kidnapped, the game is over.

Among the voices the player hears are the phrases "Help me, help me", "Very good!", "We'll be back", and "Lucky". The phrase "Help me" is played during attract mode. The Japanese version of the game features Japanese speech, such as「助けて！」 ("Tasukete!") instead of "Help Me!"

== Legacy ==
Bandits from Sirius Software for the Apple II (1982) is a Stratovox clone where the player protects fruit instead of astronauts. Spider Fighter (1982) for the Atari 2600 also has the player protecting fruit, and Digital Press described it as Stratovox without voice.

== See also ==
- Berzerk (1980), another arcade video game with speech synthesis
