= Transylvania (series) =

1980s video game series

- Genre: Adventure
- Publisher: Penguin Software
- Creator: Antonio Antiochia
- First release: Transylvania; 1982 (Apple II)
- Latest release: Transylvania III - Vanquish the Night; 1989

Transylvania was the name of a trilogy of computer games released for several home computers of the 1980s. The games were graphic adventure games created by Antonio Antiochia and produced by Penguin Software/Polarware.

== Transylvania ==
The game was published in 1982 for the Apple II, followed by conversions to the Atari 8-bit computers and Commodore 64. It was released for Mac in 1984, then Amiga, Atari ST, and MS-DOS in 1985.

== The Crimson Crown - Further Adventures in Transylvania ==
Released in 1985 under the title The Crimson Crown, on the same platforms as its predecessor. The game tasks the player with a quest to defeat a magical vampire with the assistance of Princess Sabrina (who is now a fledgling magician) and the heir to the throne, Prince Erik.

== Transylvania III - Vanquish the Night ==
Released in 1989 under the title Transylvania III: Vanquish The Night, this game was released for Apple IIGS and PC. It used VGA graphics (PC version), more complex puzzles and a larger vocabulary. The game also had some digital voice and many of the puzzles involved references to ancient mythology. In this game the player had to vanquish an evil king.

== Legacy ==
Many years later, Penguin Software released several of the game series as freeware.

Also after end of official support, an enthusiast reconstructed a source code variant of the game's series engine to port it to modern platforms.
