= Snake Core =

2020 video game

- Developer: OrangePixel
- Publisher: OrangePixel
- Platforms: Android iOS; Microsoft Windows; Nintendo Switch
- Release: 25 March 2020
- Genres: Snake, shooter
- Mode: Single-player

Snake Core is a snake and shooter game developed by Dutch studio OrangePixel.

The objective of the game is to kill the Alien Overlord, nicknamed "The End Boss". The game takes place somewhere in between Groundskeeper and Ashworld, other games from the company.

== Gameplay ==
The player controls a line of soldiers that gets bigger through a recruiting mechanism. Similarly to Snake, the player must avoid hitting the walls, otherwise the soldiers will die. The soldiers automatically shoots aliens and bombs inside their range. The player must also defuse bombs and defend important locations. It is possible to upgrade the soldiers through power-ups. The game features several game modes and routes that can be chosen through a node system. The routes are very distinct from each other.

== Development and release ==
OrangePixel first announced Snake Core on 2 March 2020. The game was released for iOS on 25 March 2020, with its Android release happening on 8 April 2020. On 23 February 2023, the game was released for Nintendo Switch. The game is also available for download on Steam.

== Reception ==
In 2021, Snake Core was a nominee for the PG Awards. Pocket Gamer ranked the game in third on the list of mobile games that resembles Snake.
