= The Blade of Blackpoole =

1982 video game

- Publisher: Sirius Software
- Writer: Tim Wilson
- Platforms: Apple II, Atari 8-bit, Commodore 64, FM-7, PC-88, PC-98
- Release: 1982
- Genre: Adventure

The Blade of Blackpoole is an adventure game written for the Apple II by Tim Wilson and published in 1982 by Sirius Software. It was ported to the Atari 8-bit computers, Commodore 64, FM-7, PC-88, PC-98.

== Gameplay ==
The Blade of Blackpoole is a game in which the player must recover and return the stolen magical sword Myraglym.

== Reception ==
Computer Gaming World reviewed the game and stated that "A perfect score is 500 and your score is displayed as a ratio of this 500. The less moves it takes you to complete the quest the higher the score. This adds much to the game's potential life span."
