= The Spy's Adventures in Europe =

1987 video game

- Developer: Polarware
- Publisher: Polarware
- Platforms: Apple II, MS-DOS
- Release: 1987
- Genre: Adventure

The Spy's Adventures in Europe is an adventure video game published in 1987 by Polarware.

== Gameplay ==
The Spy's Adventures in Europe is a game in which one to six players are spies who can either work together or against each other.

== Reception ==
David M. Wilson reviewed the game for Computer Gaming World, and stated that "In summary, The Spy's Adventures series is quite enjoyable, not to mention educational. The game is a must for families with children because of its enjoyable methods of teaching geography, if not because it is simply (and simple) fun."
