= Outpost (1981 video game) =

Apple II shoot'em up

- Publisher: Sirius Software
- Programmer: Tom McWilliams
- Platform: Apple II
- Release: 1981
- Genre: Fixed shooter

Outpost is a fixed shooter for the Apple II programmed by Tom McWilliams and published by Sirius Software in 1981. It is a variant of the arcade game Space Zap.

In March 1982, NBC News reported that Outpost earned McWilliams, then still a teenager, for at least US$60,000.

== Legacy ==
According to Tim Skelly, Scott Boden was working on an arcade video game port of Outpost for Cinematronics. After Skelly and Boden left the company, the game was reworked as the more cutesy title Boxing Bugs by Jack Ritter, which they called a "travesty".
