= Quetzi =

2024 video game

- Developer(s): Pictoline
- Publisher(s): Capital Digital Ventures
- Platform(s): Android, iOS
- Release: 21 March 2024
- Genre(s): Snake
- Mode(s): Single-player

Quetzi is a Snake game with elements of Teotihuacan mythology.

== Gameplay ==
Instead of a snake, the player controls Quetzalcoatl, nicknamed Quetzi. On adventure mode, Quetzi is seeking for revenge and to rejoin the Teotihuacan pantheon. For that, he must build the body of the Feathered Serpent and fight Teotihuacan gods while solving puzzles from 18 levels.

There is also a classic mode, a reiteration of Snake.

== Development and release ==
Quetzi was developed by Mexican studio Pictoline and published by Capital Digital Ventures. The art was made by Raul Urías. The game was released on 21 March 2024 for Android and iOS.
