= Spider Fighter =

1983 video game

- Developer: Activision
- Publisher: Activision
- Programmer: Larry Miller
- Platform: Atari 2600
- Release: January 1983
- Genre: Fixed shooter
- Mode: Single-player

Spider Fighter is a fixed shooter designed by Larry Miller for the Atari 2600 and published by Activision in 1983. The game is a re-themed version of the arcade video game Stratovox. The object of Spider Fighter is to protect fruit—grapes, strawberries, oranges, and bananas—from four kinds of bugs.

According to the manual, Miller was "the newest addition to the Activision design team." He went on to create the Atari 2600 racing game Enduro for Activision, released in 1983.

== Gameplay ==
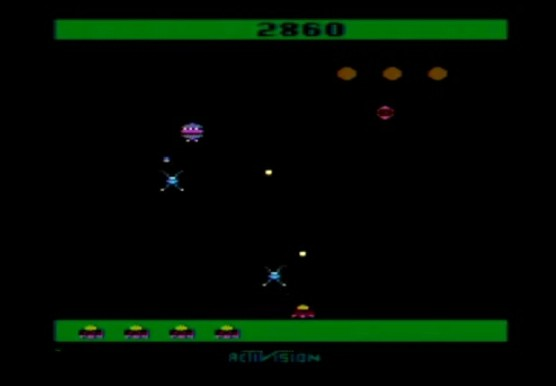
The player still has all three oranges (upper right).

In each level, the player protects three pieces of fruit using a blaster that moves horizontally along the bottom of the screen. The joystick button fires a shot upward toward four types of attackers. Each level contains a set number of "master nests": enemies which can grab a piece of fruit and drag it off the left side of the screen. A nest drops the fruit when shot. The game ends if all fruit has been stolen or all of the blasters are destroyed. The type of fruit varies per level: grapes, strawberries, oranges, and bananas.

There is an option to have the shots move horizontally with the blaster after being fired, allowing them to be steered.

At the time of release, anyone who sent a photo showing a score of 40,000 or more points received a patch for the Activision "Spider Fighters".

== Reception ==
Spider Fighter was not as successful as Activision's other fixed shooter released earlier the same year, Megamania.

Electronic Fun with Computers & Games gave the game 3 out 4 joysticks in the May 1983 issue. A June 1983 Electronic Games review was more critical, claiming it a "keen disappointment" and a "mediocre title from a superior game company." Joystik took the middle road, calling it "a better than average bottom-shoot game that somehow looks like it should be more difficult than it is."

In a retrospective look, Digital Press described it as "much like the coin-op game Stratovox but w/o the voice". Writing for AtariHQ, Keita Iida said "2600 players who are familiar with Activision's usual efforts (which are exceptional overall) might feel a bit let down by Spider Fighter."

== See also ==
- Bandits
