= Deadly Duck =

1982 video game

- Developer: Sirius Software
- Publisher: Fox Video Games
- Designer: Ed Hodapp
- Platforms: Atari 2600, VIC-20
- Release: NA: January 20, 1982
- Genre: Fixed shooter

Deadly Duck is fixed shooter game for the Atari 2600 released on January 20, 1982, in North America. It was designed by Ed Hodapp for Sirius Software and published by Fox Video Games. It was later ported, by Jeremy Jones, to the VIC-20.

== Gameplay ==
Gameplay screenshot

Cranky crabs are attempting to get the ducks out of their ponds. The crabs fly in the air while throwing bricks and bombs at the ducks. To fight back, the ducks are armed with a bill that is also a gun barrel that shoots a limitless supply of bullets straight up.

The player starts with four lives and a bonus life is awarded when all eight crabs in a level have been shot. If the player is hit by a brick, a life is lost. When bricks land at the bottom of the play area they impede player movement for a temporary period.
