= Epoch (video game) =

1981 Apple II game

- Developer: Larry Miller
- Publisher: Sirius Software
- Designer: Larry Miller
- Platform: Apple II
- Release: 1981
- Genre: Space combat simulator

Epoch is a space combat simulator for the Apple II written by Larry Miller and published by Sirius Software in 1981.

== Gameplay ==
Epoch uses a first-person camera to aim at oncoming enemy spaceships. The player must steer the reticle in-line with the enemy ships in order to destroy them before they destroy the player's ship. The player does not have infinite ammo or fuel, but can steer the ship towards friendly spaceships and bases to refuel.

== Reception ==
Ron Boerger reviewed Epoch in The Space Gamer No. 48, commenting that "this is an excellent game. If you like arcade-type games, Epoch is a must; it's among the best out for the Apple."

Barry Gittleman reviewed the game for Computer Gaming World, and stated that "If you are the type that likes simple games, like Space Invaders, pinball, etc., you will probably have a bit of trouble adjusting to Epoch, which at times can be a very high speed game. Most computer gamers, especially space and shoot-em-up lovers, will enjoy this game. It is planned out in detail, and well programmed."
