= Hard Lines =

2011 video game

- Developer: Spilt Milk Studios
- Platforms: iOS, Android
- Release: iOS; June 9, 2011; Android; October 3, 2011
- Genre: Snake
- Mode: Single-player

Hard Lines is a video game by British developer Spilt Milk Studios, released for iOS and Android in 2011. It is an interpretation the Snake concept with six modes.

== Reception ==
Reception

Aggregate score
Aggregator	Score
Metacritic	86/100

Review scores
Publication	Score
Edge	8/10
Eurogamer	8/10
Gamezebo	80/100
Pocket Gamer	4/5 stars
TouchArcade	4/5 stars

The iOS version received "generally favorable reviews" according to the review aggregation website Metacritic.

AppSmile wrote, "A blast of nostalgia from days gone by, Hard Lines improves upon the winning formula by offering multiple game modes, multiple input methods, and a rocking soundtrack to boot." AppSpy said, "Hard Lines doesn't require fancy 3D graphics or a huge gimmick to make Snake fun again; amusing writing, multiple modes and competitive AI go a long way to revive this classic game." SlideToPlay argued, "You will believe...that lines have feelings, too." 148Apps said, "Hard Lines is a little gem simply put. It's immensely enjoyable offering that 'just one more go' mentality. With its keen sense of humor (right down to the credits song which is very much worth listening to), Hard Lines keeps one step ahead of the pack making it an essential purchase." TouchArcade wrote, "Don't write this off as just another knockoff. Hard Lines takes the formula further with six great game modes. Yes, you can play Snake mode, where your line grows ever longer as you gobble up glowy things." Multiplayer.it wrote, "Hard Lines is an amazing attempt to revive an old gameplay with a formula that mixes two different gameplay mechanics. That's not just a Snake clone: it's a game about surviving that charms the player with chiptune music and neon graphics." Edge wrote, "It gets far more laughs than it should, and special mention to its credits song: perhaps the finest ending on the App Store. Original, funny, and intense: for a game based on Snake, not bad at all." Eurogamer said, "Like most things in life, personality goes a long way, and Hard Lines has it in spades. And probably buckets as well." Pocket Gamer wrote, "A gloriously inventive combination of Nokia's Snake and Tron's light cycles, Hard Lines includes a dazzling variety of modes and provides weeks of entertainment for short-burst gamers and dedicated score-chasers alike." Gamezebo wrote, "In taking a classic concept and packing it to the brim with personality and playability, Spilt Milk Studios has developed an absolute winner through and through. If you've ever enjoyed Snake, TRON, or talking lines, make this one your next purchase." NZGamer wrote, "It's not the most amazing thing ever by any stretch of the imagination but if you like the idea of a suped-up Snake, with a bunch of modes, and don't want to lower yourself to lugging a dated mobile phone around with you, it's hard to beat." Pixelated Sausage wrote, "Hard Lines is basically Snake with a lot of deviations and the presence of personality. It may be my love of Snake, but Hard Lines is one of the best iPhone games I've played in quite some time."
