= Xyphus =

1984 video game

- Developer: Penguin Software
- Publisher: Penguin Software
- Designers: Skip Waller; Dave Albert
- Programmer: Bob Hardy (Mac)
- Platforms: Commodore 64, Apple II, Mac
- Release: 1984
- Genre: Role-playing
- Mode: Single-player

Xyphus is a role-playing video game first released in 1984. The game was designed by Skip Waller and Dave Albert, with a Mac version by Bob Hardy, for Penguin Software. It was the first RPG on Macintosh. It had upgraded graphics and a mouse friendly user-interface. Xyphus is pronounced, Eks-see-foose, and is the Greek word for sword.

== Plot ==
The game takes place in the world of Arroya 10,000 years after the demon lord Xyphus was defeated, but not killed. His heart had been ripped out, and magic amulets sprang from drops of his blood, becoming the source of all magic in Arroya. The land became forbidden to humankind for monsters and dangerous creatures of all kinds inhabit Arroya. But a great leader, Das, has arisen and vows to bring civilization back to Arroya. This can only be accomplished by a small band of mercenary troops recruited from the races of humans, elves, and dwarves. As told in song only this band can destroy Xyphus, for as long as Xyphus lives, his minions shall roam and no peace will ever reign over the lands of Arroya.

== Gameplay ==
The game begins with the creation of a party of four characters a mix of Humans, Dwarves, Elves, fighters, and magic-users. These four adventurers must then explore the lands of Arroya battling a plethora of monsters; which include various races of goblins, various lycanthropes, giant slugs, anthrodons, various demons, and villainous leaders such as the tribal shaman Erse, the orcish hetman, the Demon Prince Erranugh, and a vampire. Through these battles the adventurers gain gold and experience points which they can use to upgrade and purchase new magic, weapons, and armour as they go. The characters need to gather Xiphoid amulets to cast magic spells and visit forts or trading posts in order to heal, level-up, and/or purchase new items. The game consists of six scenarios including the final one where your adventurers head underground to face the Demon Lord Xyphus, himself.

== Reception ==
Commodore Power/Play picked Xyphus as the best role-playing game of 1984.

MacUser considered Xyphus a good introductory role-playing game and the least intimidating role-playing game available for Macintosh due to its "sequential structure and icon control."

A 1985 Computer Games magazine review rated Xyphus A+, calling it "easily the best new role-playing game of the year."

Games magazine selected Xyphus as one of the best computer games of 1984 in the Adventure category, praising its originality and calling it an excellent introduction to role-playing games that would satisfy experienced players with its brevity and detail.

The 1986 Macworld Game Hall of Fame named Xyphus as runner-up to Wizardry: Proving Grounds of the Mad Overlord in the Best Role-Playing Game category.
