= Bandits (video game) =

1982 video game

- Publisher: Sirius Software
- Programmers: Apple II; Tony Ngo; Benny Ngo; VIC-20; Leonard Bertoni
- Platforms: Apple II, Atari 8-bit, Commodore 64, VIC-20
- Release: 1982
- Genre: Fixed shooter
- Mode: Single-player

Bandits is a fixed shooter written by Tony and Benny Ngo for the Apple II and published in 1982 by Sirius Software. The game is a clone of Taito's 1980 Stratovox arcade video game where the goal is to prevent aliens from stealing objects. Bandits was ported to the Atari 8-bit computers, Commodore 64, and VIC-20.

== Gameplay ==
Supplies stored on the moon–represented as fruit–are coveted by alien invaders. Various types of bandits enter via a mothership in waves. The player's job is to shoot them using the spaceship at the bottom of the screen. If an invader reaches the bottom right of the screen, it steals an item. The player can activate a shield which makes the spaceship invulnerable for a limited time. There are 28 levels.

== Reception ==
David H. Ahl found the game to be "sensational" and "great fun." He liked the wide range of alien types, but found the best control scheme to be the one the fewest people were likely to use: an Atari CX40 joystick connected through a Sirius Joyport. This option allows pushing forward on the stick to activate shields; it isn't available with an Apple joystick.

Dawn Gordon, reviewing the Atari 8-bit version for Electronic Games, wrote: "Bandits has a very annoying flaw. The time lapse from when the disk is booted to when play actually begins is three minutes and seven seconds! As each level is completed throughout the game, the computer pauses to load additional information, and the process can take up to 12 seconds."

== See also ==
- Spider Fighter
