= Snake Byte =

1982 video game

- Publisher: Sirius Software
- Designer: Chuck Sommerville
- Programmers: Apple II; Chuck Sommerville; Atari 8-bit Dan Thompson; VIC-20, C64; Dan Stanfield
- Platforms: Apple II, Atari 8-bit, Commodore 64, VIC-20
- Release: 1982: Apple, Atari, VIC-20; 1983: C64
- Genre: Snake
- Mode: Single-player

Snake Byte is video game written by Chuck Sommerville for the Apple II and published by Sirius Software in 1982. The game is a single-player variant of the snake concept. It was released the same year for Atari 8-bit computers and on cartridge for the VIC-20. A Commodore 64 version followed in 1983.

== Gameplay ==
The player controls a snake, crawling into a rectangular area. At the start of the game the snake has three lives and gains a life when it successfully exits a level. The goal is to eat 10 apples in each of the 28 levels. If an apple is not eaten during the given deadline, three extra apples are to be eaten. The snake becomes longer and moves more quickly with each apple eaten. The snake loses a life when crashing into a fence, the wall or itself. After the last apple in each round is eaten the snake must exit the area through a gate which appears. Higher levels have more complicated fences, making the area trickier to navigate.

Levels are increasingly difficult and the last ones allow almost no mistakes at all. Level 29 wraps back to level 1, but the counter does not reset. After completing enough levels the display will go from 99 to 00.

The game can be played in two modes: two-key (left/right) or four-key (left/right/up/down), with 0, 1 or 2 bouncing plums. Plums bounce around within the area and kill the snake when they hit its head.

== Reception ==
Ahoy! gave Snake Byte grades of B− for graphics and A for gameplay. It stated that the game "is one of the most engaging and challenging programs you can buy... you can't hope to do better in terms of entertainment."
