= The Quest (1983 video game) =

- Developer: Penguin Software
- Publisher: Penguin Software
- Designers: Dallas Snell; Joe Toler; Joel Ellis Rea
- Platforms: Apple II, Atari 8-bit, Commodore 64, MS-DOS, Mac
- Release: July 1983
- Genre: Interactive fiction
- Mode: Single-player

The Quest is a graphic fantasy text adventure released in 1983 by Penguin Software. It was designed by Dallas Snell for the Apple II and was ported to the Atari 8-bit computers, Commodore 64, MS-DOS, and Mac.

== Plot ==
The game takes place in a medieval fantasy setting in the Kingdom of Balema as a dragon threatens its citizens. The player takes the role of the King's newest adviser and with the help of the King's champion, Gorn, sets out to end the dragon menace.

== Gameplay ==
Gameplay screenshot (Atari 8-bit)

The player controls the actions of the party by typing basic commands that are to be issued by the player's character and performed by either the group, Gorn, or the player's character. The game is played largely by nonlinear exploration and finding important items to allow the player to complete the objective. The player has access to both a text and graphic description of each scene and is able to toggle between strictly text and text/graphic mode.

== Development ==
When the game was brought to Penguin Software, some of its content was deemed slightly too mature for publication and was subsequently "toned down" for its release.

== Reception ==
The game was given a review in Playboy and is the only game published by Penguin Software to be reviewed by the magazine. Electronic Fun with Computers & Games called it "one of the best combinations of graphics and text around". While praising the graphics, SoftSide described the game's multiple ways to win as a "unique aspect". Softline wrote, "It looks like Penguin Software has really done it: adventure game with beautiful hi-res graphics, a great plot, and sneaky surprises!"
