= Wavy Navy (video game) =

1983 video game

- Publisher: Sirius Software
- Designer: Rodney McAuley
- Platforms: Apple II, Atari 8-bit, Commodore 64
- Release: 1983
- Genre: Fixed shooter
- Modes: Single-player, multiplayer

Wavy Navy is a video game designed by Rodney McAuley for the Apple II and published by Sirius Software in 1983. Versions for the Atari 8-bit computers and Commodore 64 were released the same year. Wavy Navy is a nautically themed fixed shooter with left and right controls to move the player's PT boat, but there is an additional complexity as the boat moves up and down with the large ocean waves that scroll beneath it. Some reviewers found that the waves added an interesting twist, while others called it too similar to other fixed shooters like Galaxian.

Prior to Wavy Navy, McAuley wrote several Apple II games for Creative Computing magazine.

== Gameplay ==
The player's boat is at bottom-center, between two waves, firing upward at enemy planes and helicopters.

Wavy Navy is a fixed shooter where the player moves a gun-equipped boat left and right along the surface of a body of water, shooting straight up at formations of enemy aircraft. A regular pattern of waves moves beneath the boat, causing it to also move vertically. The direction and speed of the waves vary per level.

The core enemies are planes grouped in a formation, similar to Galaxian, that break off and dive at the player's boat. Other flying enemies are machine gun-equipped helicopters, Exocet missiles, and bomb-dropping jets. The helicopters take the place of the flagships in Galaxian, sitting atop the rows of planes. Mines also appear in the water.

Completing a round by destroying all attackers awards 50 points for each PT boat remaining.

== Reception ==
Owen Linzmayer, writing for Creative Computing Video & Arcade Games, rated the game "Excellent" and called the graphics "superbly done." A review of the Atari 8-bit version in Videogaming and Computergaming Illustrated began, "This one might well be called Galaga meets Moon Patrol on the high seas.". Reviewing the Commodore 64 version, Ahoy! magazine wrote: "Sirius has succeeded where others have failed in working new wrinkles into the slide-and-shoot format." The 1984 Software Encyclopedia, published by Electronic Games, gave the game a 9 out of 10: "By adding a few novel details to the basic invasion game genre, designer Rodney McAuley has produced something rather special". Jerry Pournelle named Wavy Navy his game of the month for April 1984.

In an Antic review, David Faughn noted the similarities to Galaxian and cautioned not buying Wavy Navy if you already own that game. Michael Blanchet, for Electronic Fun with Computers & Games, asked "How long does Sirius, or any software company for that matter, think the gaming public wants to play silly rehashes of Space Invaders?" and "are video game designers devoid of imagination?"
