= Sleeping Freshmen Never Lie =

2005 novel by David Lubar

- Book Cover
- Author: David Lubar
- Cover artist: R. Lawrence Amari
- Language: English
- Genre: Young adult novel
- Publisher: Speak
- Publication date: 2005
- Publication place: United States
- Media type: Print (Hardback & Paperback)
- ISBN: 978-0-14-240780-6
- Followed by: Sophomores and Other Oxymorons

Sleeping Freshmen Never Lie is a 2005 young adult novel by David Lubar. It is a story about the high school experiences of a fourteen-year-old boy named Scott Hudson. The book was one of the ALA's book picks for 2006.

Sleeping Freshmen Never Lie follows the character of Scott Hudson as he attempts to survive high school and attract the attention of his crush Julia, a girl who recently became beautiful. If dealing with school activities and growing up isn't stressful enough, Scott's mother has announced that she's going to have a baby. In an attempt to make all of this more manageable, Scott tries to write down tips for getting through daily life and high school for his unborn sibling. The novel follows Scott's journey as he learns what to do and what not to do in high school as well as balancing activities, homework, friendships, and relationships with girls. Sophomores and Other Oxymorons is a sequel to the book and was released on August 18, 2015.

== Plot ==
Scott Hudson enters J.P. Zenger High as a freshman, along with his three best friends, Mitch, Patrick, and Kyle, and quickly realizes that it is very different from middle school. Scott gets put into advanced classes, including an Honors English class which, despite the amount of homework, is his favorite class and his English teacher, Mr. Franka, becomes a mentor to him. Scott finds out that he is not in classes with any of his friends since he is carrying all honors and college prep classes. He tries his best from the very start to get the attention of Julia Baskins, a girl who was in his kindergarten class and has become very attractive over the summer. Because of her beauty she quickly blends in with the popular girls and is attracted to the football players who are often bullying Scott. Scott also finds himself connected to another classmate named Louden, who is better known as Mouth.

Scott tries every attempt to get Julia's attention such as joining the school paper, because he thinks that she is part of the staff, only to discover that she has just written a single column for the paper. He then runs for student council, after finding out that Julia is also running as well, and wins a seat, only to find out that she has not won. As a result, Scott resigns from his position on the student council, making Julia the new council member. He also auditions for the school play and is selected as a member of the crew, thinking that Julia would be in the play. However, Julia has not been selected as a member of the cast or crew. Soon, a new girl named Lee arrives at school, who wears face pins and weird clothes, and has wildly colored hair. Both soon realize that they share the same interests, but Scott cannot get past his crush on Julia. He also makes friends with a senior named Wesley. Though the two share some interests, they have little in common. Then to put the cherry on top of all this excitement going on in his life, his mother announces that she is pregnant. He copes with all of this by creating a tip book for his soon-to-be baby sibling to help him, or her, survive high school when they get to it. In his entries to the baby, he often shows disdain by using degrading terms to talk to it such as "Smelly" or "Blob of unformed goo". He writes it so he can try to be a good older brother to this new baby, since Scott's own brother was rarely present.

As time goes by, Scott starts to lose his best friends. Mitch finds a girlfriend and soon forgets the group; Patrick moves to Texas, then to Japan; Kyle joins the wrestling team and soon puts Scott down for having a crush on Julia. Julia's boyfriend, Vernon, later beats up Scott after finding out from Kyle (who lost a fight with Scott) that Scott has a crush on his girlfriend. Scott realizes that what a person says and does can affect the life of another after Mouth attempts to commit suicide. Later, he learns that not everything is what it seems once he finds out that his older brother, Bobby, who is struggling to find a job, can barely read. Scott's mother eventually gives birth to a new baby boy, whom they name Sean. Meanwhile, Bobby finds a job through guitar-playing and Julia eventually starts dating a nicer person, though she is now close enough to Scott to give him a kiss on the cheek.

== Reception ==
Critical reception for Sleeping Freshmen Never Lie was mixed to positive, with TeenReads praising the character of Scott Hudson. Kirkus Reviews wrote that the book was "Fresh, funny and perfectly plausible as a demonstration of various writing exercises for classroom use, but only if you like laughter." AudioFile praised the production values of the audio version. The School Library Journal called Sleeping Freshmen Never Lie "an excellent choice for public and school libraries".

Publishers Weekly wrote that the book "strains too hard to be clever" and that "most readers will breathe a sigh of relief when the gimmicks start to fade". Booklist criticized Sleeping Freshmen Never Lie, stating that it "delivers too many messages as Scott learns one important lesson after another" but that "most readers will find plenty of amusing, accurate observations about freshman life, from the insecurities of first dates to the dangers of walking the hall between classes".
