= Call to Arms (1982 video game) =

1982 video game

- Developer: Mike Falkner
- Publisher: Sirius Software
- Platform: MS-DOS
- Release: 1982
- Genre: Computer wargame

Call to Arms (also known as Conquest) is a computer wargame published in 1982 by Sirius Software for MS-DOS. It was developed by Mike Falkner.

== Gameplay ==
Call to Arms is a game in which players can fight opponents in Europe during 1942 or in Scotland during 1750 as a strategy wargame.

== Reception ==
Mark Lacine reviewed the game for Computer Gaming World, and stated that "Conquest is a very enjoyable game, simple to learn and challenging enough for the serious computer gamer."
