= David Lubar =

American writer

- Born: March 16, 1954 (age 72); Morristown, New Jersey, United States
- Education: Rutgers University
- Occupations: Author; Video game programmer
- Notable work: Fantastic Voyage; Pastfinder; Sleeping Freshmen Never Lie

David Lubar (born March 16, 1954) is an author of numerous books for teens. He is also a video game programmer who programmed Atari 2600 games for Sirius Software, such as Fantastic Voyage and The Challenge of Nexar. He later developed games under contract with companies such as Activision, Absolute Entertainment, THQ, and more. His first books were published in 1995. Since 1999, he's been a full time author of children's literature with over 50 published works.

== Biography ==
Lubar was born and raised in Morristown, New Jersey. As a boy he frequented the school library where his mother worked, as well as the town library and county library. He attended Rutgers University and graduated with a degree in philosophy. After graduating, he tried to write full-time, but a low income forced him to pursue more lucrative options. David married his wife around 1977. He began writing stories for Creative Computing. Reading the magazine introduced him to video games for the first time. He began writing code for the Apple II even before buying one in 1978. In 1980, he became an associate editor for Creative Computing and wrote a book titled The Creative Computing Guide to Videogames.

Working for Creative Computing, Lubar met Mark Pelczarski, founder of Penguin Software. He contributed to a graphics package they released called The Complete Graphics System. In 1982, Sirius Software had entered into a joint venture with Fox Video Games to develop Atari 2600 games, Larry Miller, who had developed Apple II games for Sirius and would later join Activision, reached out to Pelczarski looking for talent. Lubar's name was mentioned and Miller asked him to move out to Sacramento, California to work for Sirius Software. There he designed five games for the Atari 2600. Four published by Fox Video Games and one, The Challenge of Nexar, published by Spectravision. A few also received home computer conversions published by Sirius.

Due to the video game crash of 1983, Fox Video Games collapsed and left Sirius in financial trouble. Lubar left and took a job with Activision designing Commodore 64 and Atari 8-bit computer games, including Pastfinder. Lubar continued to develop games, mainly conversions. By the late 80s, he moved back to the east coast with his wife and daughter and took freelance work. He developed games under contract with Absolute Entertainment, THQ, Origin Systems, Broderbund and more. By the end of his career, the majority of his games were released for the NES, Game Boy, and SNES.

Lubar returned to writing in 1994 while still working as a developer. By 1995, he had sold six books. During 1998 and 1999, Lubar again worked briefly for Dan Kitchen, the founder of the now bankrupt Absolute Entertainment. He developed conversions of Frogger and Super Breakout for the Game Boy. After a royalty deal on Frogger 2: Swampy's Revenge fell through, Lubar returned exclusively to writing. From 2000 to 2005, Lubar wrote short stories for various collections such as Ribbiting Tales, Lost and Found and Shattered. By 2022, more than 50 of his books had been published.

== Works ==
=== Books for Young Readers ===
==== Standalones ====
- Monster Road (1999)
- Wizards of the Game (2003)
- Dog Days (2004)
- Punished! (2005)
- Toon Out (2007)

Emperor of the Universe

- Emperor of the Universe (2019)
- The Clone Catastrophe (2021)
- The Emperor's Last Stand(coming September 2023)

==== Nathan Abercrombie, Accidental Zombie ====
- My Rotten Life (2009)
- Dead Guy Spy (2010)
- Goop Soup (2010)
- The Big Stink (2010)
- Enter the Zombie (2011)

==== Monsterrific Tales ====
- Hyde and Shriek (2013)
- The Vanishing Vampire (2013)
- The Unwilling Witch (2013)
- The Wavering Werewolf (2014)
- The Gloomy Ghost (2014)
- The Bully Bug (2014)

==== Looniverse ====
- Stranger Things (2013)
- Meltdown Madness (2013)
- Dinosaur Disaster (2013)
- Stage Fright (2014)

==== Monster Itch ====
- Ghost Attack (2017)
- Vampire Trouble (2017)

==== Short stories ====
===== The Psychozone =====
- Kidzilla and Other Tales (1997)
- The Witch's Monkey and Other Tales (1997)

===== Weenies =====
- In the Land of the Lawn Weenies (2003)
- Invasion of the Road Weenies (2005)
- The Curse of the Campfire Weenies (2007)
- The Battle of the Red Hot Pepper Weenies (2009)
- Attack of the Vampire Weenies (2011)
- Beware the Ninja Weenies (2012)
- Wipeout of the Wireless Weenies (2014)
- Strikeout of the Bleacher Weenies (2016)
- Check Out the Library Weenies (2018)

===== Teeny Weenies =====
- Freestyle Frenzy (2019)
- The Intergalactic Petting Zoo (2019)
- The Boy Who Cried Wool (2019)
- My Favorite President (2019)
- Fishing for Pets (2020)
- The Eighth Octopus (2020)

=== Books for Teens ===
==== Standalones ====
- Flip (2003)
- Dunk (2004)
- Extremities: Stories of Death, Murder, and Revenge (2013)
- Character, Driven (2016)

==== Talents ====
- Hidden Talents (1999)
- True Talents (2007)

==== Scott Hudson ====
- Sleeping Freshmen Never Lie (2005)
- Sophomores and Other Oxymorons (2015)

=== Video games ===
==== Apple II ====
- Bumper Blocks
- Obstacle Course
- Killing Zone

==== Atari 2600 ====
- Worm War I
- Fantastic Voyage
- The Challenge of Nexar
- Flash Gordon (also known as Spider City)
- Space Master X-7
- Bumper Bash
- My Golf
- River Raid II, a sequel to River Raid based on a concept by Dan Kitchen

==== Atari 8-bit computers ====
- Pastfinder
- Alpha Shield

==== Nintendo Entertainment System ====
- The Simpsons: Bart vs. the World

==== Game Boy ====
- Home Alone
- Frogger
- Frogger 2: Swampy's Revenge
