= Fantastic Voyage =

1966 film by Richard Fleischer

- Theatrical release poster
- Directed by: Richard Fleischer
- Screenplay by: Harry Kleiner
- Story by: Jerome Bixby; Otto Klement; Adaptation: David Duncan
- Produced by: Saul David
- Starring: Stephen Boyd; Raquel Welch; Edmond O'Brien; Donald Pleasence; Arthur O'Connell; William Redfield; Arthur Kennedy
- Cinematography: Ernest Laszlo
- Edited by: William B. Murphy
- Music by: Leonard Rosenman
- Distributed by: 20th Century-Fox
- Release date: August 16, 1966 (Los Angeles)
- Running time: 100 minutes
- Country: United States
- Language: English
- Budget: $5.1 million
- Box office: $12 million

Fantastic Voyage is a 1966 American science fiction adventure film directed by Richard Fleischer and written by Harry Kleiner, based on a story by Otto Klement and Jerome Bixby. The film is about a submarine crew which is shrunk to microscopic size and ventures into the body of injured scientist Dr. Jan Benes to repair damage to his brain. In adapting the story for his script, Kleiner added a Cold War element. The film starred Stephen Boyd, Raquel Welch, Edmond O'Brien, Donald Pleasence, and Arthur Kennedy.

Bantam Books obtained the rights for a paperback novelization based on the screenplay and approached Isaac Asimov to write it. Because the novelization was released six months before the film, many people mistakenly believed that the film was based on Asimov's book. Its modern and imaginative production design received five nominations at the 39th Academy Awards, mostly in technical departments, winning for Best Visual Effects and Best Art Direction in Color.

The film used the concept of miniaturization in science fiction along with The Incredible Shrinking Man and inspired an animated TV series of the same name.

== Plot ==
The U.S.A. and the U.S.S.R. have both developed technology that can miniaturize matter by shrinking individual atoms, but only for one hour. A scientist, Dr. Jan Benes, working behind the Iron Curtain, has figured out how to make the process work indefinitely. With the help of American intelligence agents, including agent Charles Grant, he escapes to the Western world and arrives in NYC, but an attempted assassination leaves him comatose with a blood clot in his brain that no surgery can remove from the outside.

To save his life, Grant, U.S. Navy submariner Captain Bill Owens, medical chief and circulatory specialist Dr. Michaels, surgeon Dr. Peter Duval, and his assistant Cora Peterson are placed aboard a Navy ichthyology submarine at the Combined Miniature Deterrent Forces (CMDF) facilities. The submarine, named Proteus, is then miniaturized to "about the size of a microbe" and injected into Benes' body. The team has 60 minutes to get to the clot, remove it, and exit Benes' body; if they do not get out in time, the Proteus and its crew will begin reverting to their normal size, which will either place them under attack from Benes' immune system or kill Benes himself.

The crew faces many obstacles during the mission. An undetected AV fistula forces them to detour through the heart, where they must induce SCA to reduce turbulence strong enough to destroy the Proteus. The crew faces an unexplained loss of oxygen and must replenish their supply in the lungs. They notice "rocks" that are actually carbon particles from smoke. Grant finds the surgical laser needed to destroy the clot was damaged from the turbulence in the heart, as it was not fastened down as it had been before; this, and his safety line snapping loose while the crew was refilling their air supply, leads Grant to suspect a saboteur. The crew must cannibalize their wireless radio to repair the laser, cutting off all communication and guidance from the outside, although because the submarine is nuclear-powered, surgeons and technicians outside Benes's body can still track their movements via a radioactive tracer, allowing General Alan Carter and Colonel Donald Reid, the officers in charge of CMDF, to figure out the crew's strategies as they make their way through the body.

The sub enters the lymphatic system, but the reticular fibers start to interfere. This forces the crew to pass through the inner ear, requiring all outside personnel to make no noise to prevent destructive shocks. While the crew is removing reticular fibers clogging the submarine's vents and making the engines overheat, a fallen surgical tool causes the crew to be thrown about. Peterson is nearly killed by antibodies, but they are able to reboard the submarine in time. By the time they finally reach the clot, the crew has only six minutes remaining to operate and then exit the body.

Before the mission, Grant was briefed that Duval was the prime suspect as a potential surgical assassin, but as the mission progresses, he begins to suspect Michaels instead. During the surgery, Michaels knocks out Owens and takes control of the Proteus while the rest of the crew is outside for the operation. As Duval finishes removing the clot with the laser, Michaels tries to crash the submarine into the same area of Benes' brain to kill him. Grant fires the laser at the ship, causing it to veer away and crash, which attracts the attention of white blood cells. While Grant saves Owens from the Proteus, Michaels is killed when a white blood cell consumes the ship. The remaining crew quickly swims to one of Benes' eyes and escapes through a tear duct seconds before returning to normal size.

== Cast ==
- Stephen Boyd as Grant, a CIA Agent enlisted to protect Benes
- Raquel Welch as Peterson, technical assistant to Dr. Duval
- Edmond O'Brien as General Carter, commanding officer of Combined Miniature Deterrent Forces (CMDF)
- Donald Pleasence as Dr. Michaels, CMDF's medical chief
- Arthur O'Connell as Col. Donald Reid, CMDF's operational commander
- William Redfield as Capt. Bill Owens, a U.S. Navy officer who designed the Proteus
- Arthur Kennedy as Dr. Duval, a top-class brain surgeon
- Jean Del Val as Jan Benes, the comatose scientist who perfected the formula for unlimited miniaturization
- Barry Coe as a communications aide
- Ken Scott as a Secret Service agent
- Shelby Grant as a nurse
- James Brolin as a technician
- Brendan Fitzgerald as the wireless operator

== Production ==
The film was the original idea of Otto Klement and Jerome Bixby. They sold it to Fox, which announced the film would be "the most expensive science-fiction film ever made". Richard Fleischer was assigned to direct and Saul David to produce; both men had worked at the studio before. Fleischer had originally studied medicine and human anatomy in college before choosing to be a film director. Harry Kleiner was brought in to work on the script.

The budget was set at $5 million. The budget went up to $6 million, $3 million of which went on the sets, and $1 million on test footage.

The Proteus submarine was constructed as a full-size set piece 42 feet long, first seen in the "miniaturizer" room and later in scenes set outside the lung and inside the inner ear, when the cast was to be seen "swimming" (actually suspended by wires) outside the submarine. The full-size Proteus mockup contained all the interior sets that the actors are seen in to represent the interior of the submarine, with sections that could be pulled out to allow for cameras and crew to film the interior. The submarine was also constructed in miniature, including a large miniature around five feet in length that could be flown on wires in the abstract sets representing the inside of the human body. The heart and brain sets built to accommodate the 5-foot miniature filled a soundstage on the Fox lot—these were filmed "dry for wet", with floating, blob-shaped elements meant to be blood cells filmed separately and composited over the footage. A smaller, 18-inch miniature of the Proteus was constructed to operate in liquid for a shot of the submarine bursting through an arterial wall early in the film. A tiny Proteus miniature just a few inches in length was made for the miniaturization sequence to show the ship being picked up by a "precision handling device" and dropped into a large glass cylinder that was then miniaturized to become part of a syringe that would inject the Proteus into the brain-injured scientist.

The film starred Stephen Boyd, making his first Hollywood film in five years. It was the first role at Fox for Raquel Welch, who was put under contract to the studio after being spotted in a beauty contest by Saul David's wife.

For the technical and artistic elaboration of the subject, Fleischer asked for the collaboration of two people of the crew that he had worked with on the production of 20,000 Leagues Under the Sea, the film he directed for Walt Disney in 1954. The designer of the Nautilus from the Jules Verne adaptation, Harper Goff, also designed the Proteus; the same technical advisor, Fred Zendar, collaborated on both productions.

At one point in the film's preproduction it was positioned as one of the Derek Flint spy spoof films starring James Coburn, which were produced by 20th Century Fox and Saul David. Several script pages sampled in the bonus features of the 2012 DVD release of Fantastic Voyage show Stephen Boyd's Charles Grant character (who, like Flint, is a secret agent) being identified as Flint, and some of Flint's wisecracks about not wanting to be miniaturized survive to be uttered by Boyd's Grant in Fantastic Voyage. Years later comic actor Mike Myers proposed making an installment of his own Austin Powers spy spoof films called Shagtastic Voyage, in which Austin Powers would be injected into the body of Dr. Evil.

The military headquarters is 100 m × 30 m (328 ft × 98 ft), and the Proteus 14 m × 8 m (46 ft × 26 ft). The artery, in resin and fiberglass, is 33 m (108 ft) long and 7 m (23 ft) wide; the heart is 45 m × 10 m (148 ft × 33 ft), and the brain is 70 m × 33 m (230 ft × 108 ft). The plasma effect was produced by chief operator Ernest Laszlo via the use of multicolored turning lights, placed on the outside of translucent decors.

"There are no precedents so we must proceed by trial and error", said David.

Frederick Schodt's book The Astro Boy Essays: Osamu Tezuka, Mighty Atom, and the Manga/Anime Revolution claims that Fox had wanted to use ideas from an episode of Japanese animator Osamu Tezuka's Astro Boy in the film, but it never credited him.

Isaac Asimov, asked to write the novelization from the script, declared that the script was full of plot holes, and received permission to write the book the way he wanted. The novel came out first because he wrote quickly and because of delays in filming.

=== Music ===
The score was composed and conducted by Leonard Rosenman. The composer deliberately wrote no music for the first four reels of the film, before the protagonists enter the body of Dr. Jan Benes (Jean Del Val). Rosenman wrote that "the harmony for the entire score is almost completely atonal except for the very end when our heroes grow to normality".

== Reception ==
The film received mostly positive reviews and a few criticisms. The weekly entertainment-trade magazine Variety gave the film a positive pre-release review, stating: "The lavish production, boasting some brilliant special effects and superior creative efforts, is an entertaining, enlightening excursion through inner space—the body of a man." Bosley Crowther of The New York Times wrote: "Yessir, for straight science-fiction, this is quite a film—the most colorful and imaginative since Destination Moon" (1950). Richard Schickel of Life magazine wrote that the rewards would be "plentiful" to audiences who get over the "real whopper" of suspended disbelief required. He found that though the excellent special effects and sets could distract from the scenery's scientific purpose in the story, the "old familiar music of science fiction" in lush new arrangements was a "true delight", and the seriousness with which screenwriter Kleiner and director Fleischer treated the story made it more believable and fun. Schickel made note of, but dismissed, other critics' allegations of "camp".

As of 2025, the film holds a 91% approval rating at review aggregator Rotten Tomatoes from 35 reviews, with an average rating of 7/10. The website's critics consensus reads: "The special effects may be a bit dated today, but Fantastic Voyage still holds up well as an imaginative journey into the human body." Metacritic, which uses a weighted average, assigned the film a score of 72 out of 100, based on 9 critics, indicating "generally favorable" reviews.

=== Box office ===
According to Fox records, the film needed to earn $9,400,000 in rentals to break even and made $8,880,000, meaning it initially showed a slight loss, but television sales moved it into the black, and subsequent home video sales were almost entirely profit.

=== Awards and honors ===
The film won two Academy Awards (1966) and was nominated for three more:

Won:

Best Art Direction – Color (Jack Martin Smith, Dale Hennesy, Walter M. Scott, Stuart A. Reiss)
Best Special Effects (Art Cruickshank)

Nominated:

Best Cinematography (Ernest Laszlo)
Best Film Editing (William B. Murphy)
Best Sound Editing (Walter Rossi)

== Adaptations ==
=== Novelization ===
Fantastic Voyage
- First edition
- Author: Isaac Asimov
- Cover artist: Dale Hennesy
- Publisher: Houghton Mifflin
- Publication date: 1966
- ISBN: 978-0553275728

After acquiring the film's paperback novelization rights, Bantam Books approached Isaac Asimov to write the novelization, offering him a flat sum of $5,000 with no royalties involved. In his autobiography In Joy Still Felt, Asimov writes: "I turned down the proposal out of hand. Hackwork, I said. Beneath my dignity." However, Bantam Books persisted, and at a meeting with Bantam editorial director Marc Jaffe and 20th Century Fox executive Marcia Nassiter on April 21, 1965, Asimov agreed to read the screenplay.

In the novelization's introduction, Asimov states that he was reluctant to write the book because he believed that the miniaturization of matter was physically impossible, but he decided that it was still good fodder for story-telling and that it could still make for some intelligent reading. In addition, 20th Century Fox was known to want someone with some science-fiction clout to help promote the film. Aside from the initial "impossibility" of the shrinking machine, Asimov went to great lengths to portray with great accuracy what it would actually be like to be reduced to infinitesimal scale. He discussed the ability of the lights on the submarine to penetrate normal matter, issues of time distortion, and other side effects that the film does not address. Asimov was also bothered by the way the wreck of Proteus was left in Benes. In a subsequent meeting with Jaffe, he insisted that he would have to change the ending so that the submarine was brought out. Asimov also felt the need to gain permission from his usual science-fiction publisher, Doubleday, to write the novel. Doubleday did not object, and had suggested his name to Bantam in the first place. Asimov began work on the novel on May 31 and completed it on July 23.

In the film, the crew (apart from the saboteur Dr. Michaels) manage to leave Benes' body safely before reverting to normal size, but the Proteus remains inside, as do the remains of Dr. Michaels' body (albeit digested by a white blood cell), and several gallons (full scale) of a carrier solution (presumably saline) used in the injection syringe. Isaac Asimov pointed out that this was a serious logical flaw in the plot, since the submarine (even if reduced to bits of debris) would also revert to normal size, killing Benes in the process. Therefore, in his novelization Asimov had the crew provoke the white cell into following them, so that it drags the submarine to the tear duct, and its wreckage expands outside Benes' body. Asimov solved the problem of the syringe fluid by having the staff inject only a very small amount of miniaturized fluid into Benes, minimizing its effect on him when it expands.

Asimov did not want any of his books, even a film novelization, to appear only in paperback, so in August 1965, he persuaded Austin Olney of Houghton Mifflin to publish a hardcover edition, assuring him that the book would sell at least 8,000 copies, which it did. However, since the rights to the story were held by Otto Klement, who had co-written the original story treatment, Asimov would not be entitled to any royalties. By the time the hardcover edition was published in March 1966, Houghton Mifflin had persuaded Klement to allow Asimov to have a quarter of the royalties. Klement also negotiated for The Saturday Evening Post to serialize an abridged version of the novel, and he agreed to give Asimov half the payment for it. Fantastic Voyage (abridged to half its length) appeared in the February 26 and March 12, 1966, issues of the Post. Bantam Books released the paperback edition of the novel in September 1966 to coincide with the release of the film. Harry Harrison, reviewing the Asimov novelization, called it a "Jerry-built monstrosity", praising the descriptions of science-fiction events as "Asimov at his best", while condemning the narrative framework as "inane drivel".

=== Animated television series ===
Fantastic Voyage is an American animated science fiction TV series based on the film. The series consists of 17 half-hour episodes, airing Saturday mornings on ABC-TV from September 14, 1968, through January 4, 1969, then rebroadcast the following fall season. The series was produced by Filmation Associates in association with 20th Century Fox. A Fantastic Voyage comic book, based on the series, was published by Gold Key and lasted two issues.

=== Other adaptations ===
A comic book adaptation of the film was released by Gold Key Comics in 1967. Drawn by Wally Wood, the book followed the plot of the film with general accuracy, but many scenes were depicted differently and/or outright dropped, and the ending was given an epilogue similar as that seen in some of the early draft scripts for the film.

A parody of the film, titled "Fantastecch Voyage", was published in Mad magazine. It was illustrated by Mort Drucker and written by Larry Siegel in issue #110, April 1967. The advertising-business-themed spoof has the crew – from L.S./M.F.T. (Laboratory Sector for Making Folks Tiny) – sent to inject decongestant into a severely stuffed-up nose.

In June 1981, Marvin Davis had acquired 20th Century Fox for over $700 million. 20th Century Fox formed Fox Video Games Inc. in April 1982 to produce video games for the Atari Video Computer System (later known as the Atari 2600). Among their games was an adaptation of the Fleischer's film, with Fantastic Voyage (1982).

Fantastic Voyage II: Destination Brain (1987) was written by Isaac Asimov as an attempt to develop and present his own story apart from the 1966 screenplay. This novel is not a sequel to the original, but instead is a separate story taking place in the Soviet Union with an entirely different set of characters.

Fantastic Voyage: Microcosm is a third interpretation, written by Kevin J. Anderson, published in 2001. This version has the crew of the Proteus explore the body of a dead alien that crash-lands on earth, and updates the story with such modern concepts as nanotechnology (replacing killer white cells).

== Cancelled sequel/remake ==
Plans for a sequel or remake have been in discussion since at least 1984, but as of the beginning of July 2015, the project remained stuck in development hell. In 1984, Isaac Asimov was approached to write Fantastic Voyage II, out of which a film would be made. Asimov "was sent a suggested outline" that mirrored the film Innerspace and "involved two vessels in the bloodstream, one American and one Soviet, and what followed was a kind of submicroscopic version of World War III". Asimov was against such an approach. Following a dispute between publishers, the original commissioners of the novel approached Philip José Farmer, who "wrote a novel and sent [in] the manuscript" that was rejected despite "stick[ing] tightly to the outline" that was sent to Asimov. "It dealt with World War III in the bloodstream, and it was full of action and excitement." Although Asimov urged the publisher to accept Farmer's manuscript, it was insisted that Asimov write the novel. So, Asimov eventually wrote the book in his own way (completely different in plot from what [Farmer] had written), which was eventually published by Doubleday in 1987 as Fantastic Voyage II and "dealt not with competing submarines in the bloodstream, but with one submarine, with [an] American hero cooperating (not entirely voluntarily) with four Soviet crew members". The novel was not made into a film, however.

James Cameron was also interested in directing a remake (since at least 1997), but decided to devote his efforts to his Avatar project. He still remained open to the idea of producing a feature based on his own screenplay, and in 2007, 20th Century Fox announced that pre-production on the project was finally underway. Roland Emmerich agreed to direct, but rejected the script written by Cameron. Marianne and Cormac Wibberley were hired to write a new script, but the 2007–2008 Writers Guild of America strike delayed filming, and Emmerich began working on 2012 instead.

In spring 2010, Paul Greengrass was considering directing the remake from a script written by Shane Salerno and produced by James Cameron, but later dropped out to be replaced by Shawn Levy. It was intended that the film be shot in native stereoscopic 3D.

In January 2016, The Hollywood Reporter reported that Guillermo del Toro was in talks to direct the reboot by reteaming with David S. Goyer, who was writing the film's script with Justin Rhodes with Cameron still on the film by his production company Lightstorm Entertainment. In August 2017, it was reported that del Toro had postponed working on the film to completely focus on his film The Shape of Water, due to release the same year, and he would start pre-production in spring 2018 and would begin filming in the fall of the same year for a 2020 release.

In April 2024, Cameron offered an update on the project: "we plan to go ahead with it very soon". In December 2025, Cameron noted that there was a new script in the works with a new director.

== Similarly themed works ==
- The Invisible Enemy, a 1977 four-part serial of the British TV series Doctor Who is said to have been inspired by the film. In it, the Fourth Doctor (Tom Baker)'s body is possessed by an evil virus, so a doctor creates clones of his companion Leela (Louise Jameson) and himself to enter his head to search for the virus and destroy it.
- The 1987 film Innerspace follows a similar plotline, this time concerning test pilot Lieutenant Tuck Pendleton (Dennis Quaid) being miniaturized and injected into store clerk Jack Putter (Martin Short), although accidentally.
- The live-action/animated comedy film Osmosis Jones follows the titular white cell cop Ozzy Jones (Chris Rock) trying to stop deadly virus Thrax (Laurence Fishburne) from destroying Frank DeTorre (Bill Murray), the human he guards.

The concept of entering the human body popularized by Fantastic Voyage has been greatly influential especially in animated TV shows, of which there are several examples:

- Captain Planet and the Planeteers episode "An Inside Job" features The Planeteers battling water-borne parasites in Kwame (LeVar Burton)'s body so that he can recover.
- SpongeBob SquarePants fourth season episode "Squidtastic Voyage" spoofs the film, with SpongeBob SquarePants (Tom Kenny) and Patrick Star (Bill Fagerbakke) attempting to retrieve Squidward's clarinet reed after he swallows it. Other Nicktoons have used the Fantastic Voyage template, such as the Rugrats episode "The Inside Story", involving the babies being forced to shrink down and enter Chuckie Finster (Christine Cavanaugh)'s body to retrieve a watermelon seed, The Angry Beavers episode, "Vantastic Voyage", where scientists go inside Daggett Beaver (Richard Steven Horvitz)'s body, The Fairly OddParents first season episode "Tiny Timmy!", which has Timmy Turner (Tara Strong) being shrunk down by Cosmo (Daran Norris) and Wanda Cosma (Susanne Blakeslee) to enter Vicky (Grey DeLisle)'s body in order to study for school, and The Adventures of Jimmy Neutron, Boy Genius episode, "Journey to the Center of Carl", where Jimmy Neutron (Debi Derryberry) and his friends go inside Carl Wheezer (Rob Paulsen)'s body, among others.
- Children's educational TV series The Magic School Bus had a number of episodes involving the bus going inside a human: "For Lunch" and "Inside Ralphie" in the first season, "Flexes Its Muscles" in the second season, "Works Out" in the third season and "Goes Cellular" and "Makes a Stink" in the final season, dealing with the topics of Digestion, Germs, Body Mechanics, Circulation, Cells and Smelling respectively.
- The Iron Man animated TV series features the episode "Iron Man, On the Inside", in which Iron Man (Robert Hays) must go inside Hawkeye (John Reilly) to save him.
- Dexter's Laboratory episode "Fantastic Boyage" features Dexter (Christine Cavanaugh) attempting to inject himself into Dee Dee (Kat Cressida) to find a cure for the common cold, inadvertently winding up inside his dog.
- Futurama second season episode "Parasites Lost" involves the Planet Express crew sending microscopic copies of themselves inside Philip J. Fry (Billy West) to save him from parasites.
- Family Guy third season episode "Emission Impossible" has Stewie Griffin (Seth MacFarlane) shrinking down and going inside of Peter Griffin (MacFarlane)'s testicles to prevent him and Lois Griffin (Alex Borstein) from having another baby.
- Both Teen Titans and Teen Titans Go! feature episodes in which either Beast Boy (Greg Cipes) or Robin (Scott Menville) enter Cyborg (Khary Payton)'s body to cure him.
- The Simpsons' season 16 episode Treehouse of Horror XV sees in the segment "In the Belly of the Boss" a trip into Charles Montgomery Burns (Harry Shearer)'s body to rescue Maggie Simpson after she gets shrunk down into a pill and ingested.
- Phineas and Ferb first season episode "Journey to the Center of Candace" features Phineas Flynn (Vincent Martella) and Ferb Fletcher (Thomas Brodie-Sangster) building a shrinking submarine to enter Isabella Garcia-Shapiro (Alyson Stoner)'s chihuahua Pinky (Dee Bradley Baker), but accidentally ending up inside their sister Candace Flynn (Ashley Tisdale).
- Batman: The Brave and the Bold episode "Journey to the Center of the Bat!" has Atom (James Sie) and Aquaman (John DiMaggio) traveling through Batman (Diedrich Baker)'s body to cure him.
- Regular Show fourth season episode "Cool Cubed" features Mordecai (J. G. Quintel) and Rigby (William Salyers) shrinking and traveling into Thomas (Roger Craig Smith)'s brain to stop it from freezing.
- Rick and Morty first season episode "Anatomy Park" involves Rick Sanchez (Justin Roiland) shrinking Morty Smith (Roiland) down to fit in Ruben Ridney (Jess Harnell), a homeless man dressed as Santa Claus, to assist with the amusement park he was trying to operate inside of him.
- Archer's two-part season 6 finale "Drastic Voyage" directly spoofs the film.

== See also ==
- List of American films of 1966
- List of films featuring miniature people
- Microsurgery
