= Substation (video game) =

1995 video game

- Developer: Unique Development Sweden
- Designers: Peter Zetterberg; Oskar Burma; Olaf Johansson
- Programmers: Oskar Burman; Tord Jansson; Hans Härröd; Mikael Emtinger; Olaf Johansson; Kalle Lundqvist
- Artists: Marcus Nordberg; Rikard Hultman
- Composers: Peter Andersson; Christian Åkerhielm; Erik Tilleby
- Platforms: Atari STe, Atari Falcon
- Release: 1995
- Genre: First-person shooter
- Mode: Single-player

Substation is a first-person shooter released for the Atari STe in 1995 by Unique Development Sweden. The game is set in an underwater base that has been overrun by aliens. The game was previewed in the British ST Format, later receiving a 75%, was given a 7/10 from the French magazine STart Micro, received 80% from the German magazine ST-Computer, and was reviewed in the French ST Magazine.

== See also ==
- MIDI Maze
