= Space Zap =

1980 video game

- Arcade flyer
- Developer(s): Game-A-Tron
- Publisher(s): Midway Manufacturing
- Platform(s): Arcade, Bally Astrocade
- Release: Arcade: NA: October 1980; Astrocade: October 1981
- Genre(s): Fixed shooter
- Mode(s): Single-player

Space Zap is a space-themed fixed shooter arcade video game developed by Game-A-Tron and licensed to Midway Manufacturing in 1980. The player controls the defenses of an immobile base in the center of the screen which is attacked from the top, bottom, left, and right. Pressing one of four oversized buttons moves the gun in the corresponding direction. A fifth button fires. Space Zap shipped in three form factors: standard upright, cocktail, and a "Mini-Myte" reduced size cabinet.

An official port of Space Zap for the Bally Astrocade was released in 1981 as Space Fortress.

== Gameplay ==
The goal is to defend a base anchored in the center of the screen from alien attackers that come from the four cardinal directions. Four buttons are arranged in a diamond, corresponding to up, down, left, and right. If a projectile comes from the left, the player presses the left button to aim the gun in that direction, then a separate button to fire. If the player fails to fire in time, the base explodes. Each attack wave is punctuated by a satellite which circles the screen until it is shot or crashes into the base. After the first few levels, Space Zap becomes a high-speed reflex game. The player starts out with three lives.

The game allows up to two players, taking turns. The cocktail table version has two sets of controls, one on either side of the machine.

250 points are awarded for destroying an alien projectile, 500 for the alien ship, and 2,000 for the end of level satellite. The player receives an extra life at the scores of 150,000, and 300,000.

== Legacy ==
Cosmic Ark, published by Imagic in 1982 for the Atari 2600, started out as a clone of Space Zap. In the final game, the first part of each level is Space Zap and a second sequence was added to keep it from being repetitive.

Space Zap clones are numerous and include Outpost (1981) for the Apple II, Colorzap (1982) for the TRS-80 Color Computer, Cyclon (1983) for the VIC-20, and Starship Pegasus (1984) for the TI-99/4A. In some clones, a single joystick movement or key press shoots immediately—such as in Cosmic Ark—instead of separate controls for moving the weapon and firing it. Broderbund's Master Type (1981) teaches keyboard familiarity by having to press to correct letter or punctuation key to fire the weapon.
