= The Earth Dies Screaming =

1964 British film by Terence Fisher

- Theatrical release poster
- Directed by: Terence Fisher
- Written by: Harry Spalding (as Henry Cross)
- Produced by: Robert L. Lippert; Jack Parsons
- Starring: Willard Parker; Virginia Field; Dennis Price
- Cinematography: Arthur Lavis
- Edited by: Robert Winter
- Music by: Elisabeth Lutyens
- Production company: Lippert Films
- Distributed by: 20th Century Fox
- Release date: 14 October 1964
- Running time: 62 minutes
- Country: United Kingdom
- Language: English

The Earth Dies Screaming is a 1964 British science-fiction horror film directed by Terence Fisher and starring Willard Parker, Virginia Field and Dennis Price. It was written by Harry Spalding (as Henry Cross).

== Plot ==
Human bodies are scattered around an English village, apparently dead in a sudden cataclysm. A small group of survivors gathers in the local hotel bar, led by an American jet test pilot, Jeff Nolan. Apparently, a mysterious gas attack has killed off most of the Earth's population. Figures in space suits appear in the streets; Vi Courtland thinks they have come to rescue them, but they turn and kill her with their touch. Several of these bulletproof killers stalk the streets.

Heavily pregnant Lorna Brenard and her moody husband, Mel, arrive by car. Mel says they broke into a fallout shelter the previous night to sleep. The group goes to a local Territorial Army drill hall to look for weapons. They arm themselves and struggle for survival against the invaders in what is the first step in an alien invasion.

Vi reanimates as a zombie with white eyes. Quinn Taggart shoots and kills her. Quinn knocks out Jeff and heads north with Peggy Hatton in a sports car. She unsuccessfully tries to run off when he stops for petrol. She then insists he get her a coat, as she's cold, and escapes to a house when he enters a store to find her one. She is trapped in the house pursued by invaders and zombies, and hides in a wardrobe. After the zombie pursuing her abandons the search, Peggy runs outside and is saved by Jeff, who has been looking for her. He runs down a space-suited creature with his Land Rover, revealing it is a robot when it explodes. They go back to the drill hall, where young Lorna Brenard is about to give birth to a daughter. Meanwhile, Ed Otis cannot face the new reality and is drinking anything alcoholic he can find.

Jeff and Mel Brenard use a shortwave radio and triangulation to work out where the aliens are transmitting their control signals to the robots. They locate the transmitter tower and are about to blow it up when robots start to appear. Quinn returns to the drill hall as a zombie, accompanied by two robots. One of the robots approaches Peggy, but when the tower is destroyed, all the robots collapse. Otis shoots Quinn, saving Peggy, Lorna, and the baby. The survivors commandeer a Pan Am Boeing 707 and fly south in search of other survivors.

== Production ==
Harry Spalding said he always hated the title, but someone said it "as a joke" and "somehow it kind of stuck".

The film was shot in Shepperton Studios in Surrey. Location filming was done at the village of Shere. It was one of several 1960s British horror films to be scored by the avant-garde composer Elisabeth Lutyens, whose father, Edwin Lutyens, designed Manor House Lodge in Shere, a small property that features prominently at several points in the film.

== Cast ==
- Willard Parker as Jeff Nolan
- Virginia Field as Peggy Hatton
- Dennis Price as Quinn Taggart
- Thorley Walters as Edgar (Ed) Otis
- Vanda Godsell as Violet (Vi) Courtland
- David Spenser as Mel Brenard
- Anna Palk as Lorna Brenard

== Reception ==
The Monthly Film Bulletin wrote: "Once the fog of preliminary developments begins to disperse, robot-controlled eyeless zombies soon reveal themselves as the menace to Man. It begins spectacularly enough with cut-in shots of destruction by rail, air and road, but then declines rapidly into dullness. The robots and mindless humans are effective enough, but tritely used; the acting is substandard; and the only surprise is that Elizabeth Lutyens was commissioned to write the musical score."

Boxoffice wrote: Willard Parker, who will be remembered for his sternfaced emoting in umpteen westerns over the decades, is teamed with his wife, Virginia Field, and Britain's Dennis Price in a brisk-paced science-fiction melodrama, very much within the mold and manner of all that has been accepted by the mass market. ... Parker, as an experimental test pilot back on earth after a terrible onslaught by unknown factors has wiped out practically everybody, brings compactness and conviction to his portrayal, and there is able enough support from Miss Field and Price."

Wheeler Winston Dixon wrote about the film's use of silence: "... it's remarkable to note that in a 62-minute film, the first five to six minutes have conveyed Fisher's vision of the end of civilization entirely through a dispassionate series of images ... Much of the film, involving the pursuit of the living by the dead, is done entirely through gesture"

Writing in The Zombie Movie Encyclopedia, academic Peter Dendle cited the film as "an obvious precursor to Night of the Living Dead."

The Radio Times Guide to Films gave the film 1/5 stars, writing: "Great title, boring movie, even though it's only an hour long! Veteran horror director Terence Fisher hit the bottom of the alien-invasion barrel with the first in his off-Hammer sci-fi trilogy that continued with the better Island of Terror and Night of the Big Heat. Test pilot Willard Parker returns to England and finds the entire population wiped out by robots that kill by touch and then reanimate their victims as eyeless zombies. A dud."

== In popular culture ==
The Earth Dies Screaming was used in 1983 as the inspiration and title for an Atari 2600 video game released by Fox Video Games, a division of 20th Century Fox. The game is set in space, and involves shooting down satellites and fighter ships.

British band UB40 released the single "The Earth Dies Screaming" (catalogue: Graduate GRAD 10) in 1980, which spent 12 weeks in the UK chart, peaking at number 10.

The first track on Tom Waits' 1992 album Bone Machine is titled "Earth Died Screaming".

== Home media ==
The film was released on Region 1 DVD on 11 September 2007 and on Region 2 DVD on 29 August 2011.
