= Capture the Flag (video game) =

1983 video game

- Developer: Sirius Software
- Publisher: Sirius Software
- Designer: Paul Allen Edelstein
- Composer: George Sanger
- Platforms: Atari 8-bit, VIC-20
- Release: 1983
- Genres: Maze
- Modes: Single-player, multiplayer

Capture the Flag is a 3D first-person perspective, two player, video game, released for the Atari 8-bit computers and VIC-20 by Sirius Software in 1983. It was written by Paul Allen Edelstein as the follow-up to his 1982 game, Wayout, which has similar maze-based gameplay for one player. Along with its predecessor, Capture the Flag was among the first 3D maze games to offer the player full 360 degree movement, and one of the earliest multiplayer games from a first-person perspective within a 3D rendered environment.

== Gameplay ==
The Invader (green) is cornered by the Defender (blue)

Capture the Flag is essentially a two player version of Wayout, with one player (the "Invader") trying to find the exit (or 'flag') in the maze while the other player (the 'Defender') tries to stop them, a role similar to the computer-controlled "Cleptangle" from the first game. The main difference is that the game's display is split-screen, allowing each of the two players to view the maze from their own perspective. In the single-player version, the computer takes the role of the defender.

Each player is represented within the maze as a simple, rectangular-shaped, blue or green avatar. If the Invader finds the flag, or the Defender catches the Invader, a new maze is generated and the chase starts again. Another progression from Wayout is that instead of a finite number of mazes, Capture the Flag can create an infinite number of randomly generated mazes.

Capture the Flag also uses the mapmaker feature from Wayout, which draws the map in 2D in the lower half of the screen as each of the players move around the map. This allows each player to see the whereabouts of their opponent, but the 2D automap can be switched off to heighten the tension.

=== Controls ===
Players can choose to control their character using a joystick or the keyboard utilizing one of two methods; "Compass Movement" or "Walking Movement". Compass Movement allows the player to simply move as they would in a 2D game and watch their movements via the automap in the lower half of the screen, whereas Walking Movement allows them to use the 3D view and use the control to move forward and turn left or right.

For the two player option, players must use both the joystick and the keyboard.

== Music ==
Capture the Flag uses layered dynamic music which changes depending on the proximity of the two players. It was composed by George Sanger and was one of the first games he worked on.

== Reception ==
Electronic Fun magazine gave a very positive review in its February 1984 issue, scoring the game 4 out of 4, and said that Capture the Flag was a huge improvement on Wayout. The reviewer wrote, "it's very rare to see a good game design wholly redone by the same designer, rarer still to see him improve on his original in every single respect."

In their May 1984 issue review, Electronic Games magazine emphasised the fun aspect of playing against a human opponent, rather than a computer one, and how the music in the game added to the experience: "the music which gets louder with the close proximity of the opposing player begins to get more frenetic, and so the gamer slams into even more walls."
