= The Spy's Adventures in North America =

1986 video game

- Developer: Polarware
- Publisher: Polarware
- Platforms: Apple II, Commodore 64, MS-DOS
- Release: 1986
- Genre: Adventure

The Spy's Adventures in North America is an adventure video game published in 1986 by Polarware.

== Gameplay ==
The Spy's Adventures in North America is a game in which one to six players are spies who can either work together or against each other.

== Reception ==
David M. Wilson reviewed the game for Computer Gaming World, and stated that "In summary, The Spy's Adventures series is quite enjoyable, not to mention educational. The game is a must for families with children because of its enjoyable methods of teaching geography, if not because it is simply (and simple) fun."
