= MIDI Maze =

- Developer: Xanth Software F/X
- Publishers: Hybrid Arts (ST); Bullet-Proof Software (GB, SNES); Riverhillsoft (SCDROM2, GG)
- Platforms: Atari ST, Game Boy, Game Gear, Super NES, Super CD-ROM²
- Release: Atari ST: NA: 1987; Game Boy: NA: December 1991; Super NES: NA: September 1992; Super CD-ROM²: JP: November 26, 1993; Game Gear: JP: December 17, 1993
- Genres: First-person shooter, maze
- Mode: Multiplayer

MIDI Maze, also known as Faceball 2000, is a networked first-person shooter maze video game for the Atari ST developed by Xanth Software F/X and released in 1987 by Hybrid Arts. The game takes place in a maze of untextured walls. The world animates smoothly as the player turns, much like the earlier Wayout, instead of only permitting 90 degree changes of direction.

Using the MIDI ports on the Atari ST, the game is said to have introduced deathmatch combat to gaming in 1987. It also predated the LAN party concept by several years. The game found a wider audience when it was converted to Faceball 2000 on the Game Boy.

== Gameplay ==
Atari ST gameplay

Up to 16 computers can be networked in a "MIDI Ring" by daisy chaining MIDI ports that are built into the Atari ST series.

The game area occupies only roughly a quarter of the screen and consists of a first-person view of a flat-shaded maze with a crosshair in the middle. All players are shown as Pac-Man-like smiley avatars in various colors. Bullets are represented as small spheres.

The game is started by a designated master machine, which sets rules, divides players into teams, and selects a maze. A number of mazes come with the game, and additional mazes can be constructed using a text-editor.

== Development ==
The original MIDI Maze team at Xanth Software F/X consisted of James Yee as the business manager, Michael Park as the graphic and networking programmer, and George Miller writing the AI and drone logic.

== Ports ==
A Game Boy version was developed by Xanth, and published in 1991 by Bullet-Proof Software, with the title Faceball 2000. James Yee, owner of Xanth, had the idea of porting the 520ST application to the Game Boy. George Miller was hired to rewrite the AI-based drone logic, giving each drone a unique personality trait. This version allows two players with a Game Link Cable, or up to four players with the Four Player Adapter.

It is often rumored that the Game Boy version would allow up to 16 players by daisy-chaining Four Player Adapters, which is not the case. According to programmer Robert Champagne, the original game's code does contain a 16-player mode, but it required a special adapter that was planned to be bundled with the game, to create a "chain" of link cables. The 16-player mode and the adapter were announced in the April 1991 issue of Nintendo Power; however, Nintendo did not allow the adapter's release, so the 16-player mode cannot be enabled using original Game Boy systems. Later, a method was discovered to daisy-chain Game Boy Advance link cables to allow up to 15 players. In 2024, electrical engineer Zarithya was able to produce a 16-player adapter that replicated the functionality of the original adapter intended for the game, discovering that due to an off-by-one error, more than 15 players would never have been possible in the original release of the game even with compatible hardware. She was then able to modify the ROM to support up to 16 simultaneous players, and successfully start a 16-player match. She and others created two patches for the game, one to fix the 16-player functionality only, and another to upgrade the game to include Super Game Boy and Game Boy Color support (called "Faceball 2000 DX"), and released them on GitHub.

A Super NES version, also titled Faceball 2000, was released in 1992, supporting two players in split-screen mode. This version features completely different graphics and levels from the earlier Game Boy version. A variety of in-game music for this version was composed by George "The Fat Man" Sanger.

A Game Gear version, also titled Faceball 2000, was released to the Japanese market by Riverhill Soft. It is a colorized version of the monochrome Game Boy version, supporting two players with two handheld consoles connected by the Gear-to-Gear Cable.

A PC Engine CD-ROM version, titled only Faceball (フェイスボール), was released in Japan by Riverhill Soft.

=== Unreleased ports ===
A port of MIDI Maze for Atari 8-bit computers was developed by Xanth, but cancelled circa 1989. A prototype was eventually found and the ROM was released.

According to Robert Champagne, other unreleased ports were worked on at Xanth, including IBM PC and NES.

A port for Nintendo's Virtual Boy console, to be titled NikoChan Battle (ニコちゃんバトル) in Japan, was almost completed, but canceled as the system was discontinued in late 1995. A prototype was found in 2013, and the ROM was subsequently released.

== Reception ==
Reception

Aggregate score
Aggregator	Score
GameRankings	51.67% (SNES); 73.75 (GB)

Review scores
Publication	Score
Computer and Video Games	35/100 (SNES)
Electronic Gaming Monthly	6/10, 8/10, 6/10, 7/10 (GB)
Video Games (DE)	59% (SNES)

In 1994, Sandy Petersen reviewed the game for Dragon magazine, giving it 2 out of 5 stars. Super Gamer magazine gave an overall review score of 82% writing: "Ultra successful on the little Game Boy, this 3-D maze shoot-'em-up has been totally uprated for the SNES."

Entertainment Weekly picked Faceball 2000 as the #5 greatest game available in 1991, saying: "The Game Boy meets virtual reality (i.e., artificial, computer-enhanced, first-person perspective). In Faceball 2000, you assume the identity of a Holographically Assisted Physical Pattern Yielded for Active Computerized Embarkation – or HAPPYFACE – and hunt down your opponents. You can play alone or link up with as many as three additional players. More fun than real-life tag, and much more stimulating." CNET Gamecenter called MIDI Maze one of the 10 most innovative computer games of all time. In 2018, Den of Geek ranked the game 25th on their "25 Underrated Game Boy Games."

== Legacy ==
Personal Computer World said that in 1987, MIDI Maze introduced the concept of deathmatch combat, using the built-in MIDI ports of the Atari ST for networking. TheGamer listed it as among ten games that revolutionized first-person shooters, which was also noted by Nostalgia Nerd and VG247. Ask.Audio marveled at how it used the Atari ST's MIDI port for multiplayer gaming, also noted by Paleotronic. Nomad's Reviews listed it as among the original first-person shooters, as did GamesRadar.

MIDI-Maze II was later developed by Markus Fritze for Sigma-Soft and released as shareware.

iMaze is an open source clone of the game for Unix-like systems.

== See also ==
- Maze War
- Wayout
- The Eidolon
