= Fast Eddie (video game) =

- Developer: Sirius Software
- Publishers: Sirius Software; Fox Video Games
- Programmers: Mark Turmell; Tom McWilliams (Atari 8-bit); Kathy Bradley (C64, VIC)
- Platforms: Commodore 64, Atari 8-bit, Atari 2600, VIC-20
- Release: 1982: C64, Atari 8-bit, 2600; 1983: VIC-20
- Genre: Platform
- Mode: Single-player

Fast Eddie is a platform game developed by Mark Turmell and Sirius Software. The Atari 2600 version was published by Fox Video Games in 1982. Sirius published the Atari 8-bit computer and Commodore 64 releases in 1982 and a VIC-20 conversion in 1983.

== Gameplay ==
The player controls Fast Eddie through a four-story building, collecting prizes while avoiding obstacles. The objective is to reach the top floor and claim the final prize by jumping over the High-Top Sneaker after gathering nine prizes. The player uses a joystick to move Eddie horizontally and vertically, and a button to make him jump. The game features eight variations with different difficulty levels, with the goal of progressing through all of them.

== Reception ==
Brett Weiss, in Classic Home Video Games, 1972-1984: A Complete Reference Guide praised the game, writing that "Though not as deep or as distinctive as Space Panic or Mr. Do!'s Castle, Fast Eddie is an entertaining game that will keep gamers on their toes." The game's sound design has been described as simplistic and "paradigmatic" 8-bit music.
