= Mark Pelczarski =

American video game creator

Mark Pelczarski wrote and published some of the earliest digital multimedia computer software. In 1979 while teaching computer science at Northern Illinois University, he self-published Magic Paintbrush, which was one of the first digital paint programs for the Apple II, the first consumer computer that had color graphics capabilities.

Pelczarski was hired as an editor at SoftSide magazine in 1980, but then left to start Penguin Software in 1981 to publish his optimistically-titled Complete Graphics System, which included digital imaging and 3D wireframe rendering.

In the next year he co-wrote and published Special Effects and Graphics Magician with David Lubar, who was then writing for Creative Computing magazine. Special Effects produced digital effects with images and also contained one of the first uses of digital paintbrushes. Graphics Magician featured one of the first uses of vector graphics for image compression, as well as animation routines that made it easy for programmers to add animation to their software. Graphics Magician was licensed by most of the software publishers in the early 1980s for adding graphics and animation to their games and educational software, won numerous awards, and was one of the best selling programs of the time. It was the forerunner of software like Adobe Flash for compressed images and animation.

Pelczarski wrote a monthly column for Softalk magazine about computer graphics programming, and those columns were later collected into a book, Graphically Speaking.

In 1986 Pelczarski wrote and published one of the first digital music performance programs, MIDI Onstage, which allowed control of MIDI devices to accompany live performances. Soon after, he built the digital portion of recording studios for Jimmy Buffett and Dan Fogelberg.

Pelczarski returned to college teaching and taught one of the first online courses in 1996. As part of the development for the course he wrote Dialogue, one of the first web forum applications, which was made available free to dozens of other universities around the world as they entered into online education.

== General References ==
- "SoftSide magazine". Archive.org.
- "The Softalk Apple Project". Archive.org.
