= Penguin Software =

American video game publisher

- Industry: Software
- Predecessors: MP Software; Co-op Software
- Founded: 1978
- Founder: Mark Pelczarski
- Fate: Acquired by Merit Software
- Successor: Polarware

Penguin Software was a computer software and video game publisher from Geneva, Illinois that produced graphics and application software and games for the Apple II, Mac, IBM PC compatibles, Commodore 64, Amiga, Atari 8-bit computers, and Atari ST. It produced the graphics programs Graphics Magician and Complete Graphics System, graphic adventure games such as the Transylvania series, action games like Spy's Demise, and role-playing video games such as Xyphus.

== History ==
The company was founded in 1978 by Mark Pelczarski as "MP Software" with its first product, a graphics program called Magic Paintbrush. It evolved to "Co-op Software" as part of a sister company, Micro Co-op, then adopted the name "Penguin Software" in 1981 when software publishing became the primary focus. Like many other home computer publishers at the time, Penguin Software openly credited the developers of their games on boxes and title screens; developers that were often not direct employees of Penguin Software but rather independent designers that were paid royalties by Penguin Software for the games that sold.

Penguin Software's core products were its graphics programs that were among the industry best-sellers of the early 1980s. The Complete Graphics System, first published in 1981, was a set of drawing and 3D graphics editing programs for the Apple II by founder Mark Pelczarski. Special Effects, co-written by Pelczarski and David Lubar later the same year, helped establish the company's slogan, "the graphics people". In early 1982, Pelczarski, Lubar, and Chris Jochumson created The Graphics Magician, which would define the next several years of the company's evolution. Graphics Magician was aimed toward developers or anyone wanting to be a developer, allowing any programmer to create animations for arcade-style games and compact graphic images for adventure games and educational software.

Developers began submitting their own creations written in part with Graphics Magician to Penguin Software for publication. Those that were accepted were polished and published and the authors were paid royalties on sales. These included the first two games published by Penguin Software, the animated game Pie Man by Eagle Berns and Michael Kosaka, and the adventure game Transylvania written by Antonia Antiochia. Many other publishers of software for the Apple II also licensed The Graphics Magician for their products, as there was no fee for the license; the only requirement was a credit line that Graphics Magician software was used in the product, which served as advertising for more sales of the Penguin Software graphics tools.

One of the other widely touted aspects of Penguin Software's titles was that they deliberately stopped using copy protection, thus making it easier to back up their programs. Pelczarski sent a letter to many computer magazines to describe his position, which asked that users of their software not abuse their trust.

As software sales expanded into book stores, Penguin Software was confronted by Penguin Books in regard to infringement of their name. Fearing that the legal costs of a lawsuit could have decimated his company, even in the case of an eventual victory, Pelczarski phased in a new name "Polarware" in 1986, eventually ending the "Penguin Software" brand.

Since the Apple II, Macintosh, IBM, Commodore, and Atari computers all had varying graphics capabilities and different processors, releasing a software title for each different brand of computer usually involved programming it again from scratch for each platform. Penguin Software/Polarware began focusing on cross-platform ideas that would allow them to release games simultaneously on different systems without the lengthy re-programming process. The compact images from Graphics Magician could be used across platforms, and an adventure game development and deployment language called Comprehend was created to be system independent and was used for several releases. Also using Graphics Magician across platforms and with a portable design, the first three titles in the Adventures Around the World geography game series were released. However a similar idea called Where in the World is Carmen Sandiego reached the market a few months sooner and doomed the Penguin Software series.

In 1987, Polarware was purchased by four employees, Jeffrey (JJ) Jay, Steve Greene, Peg Smith, and Trish Glenn. This new team produced the children's software series written by Brian A. Rice, The Electric Crayon, a simple electronic coloring book. In 1988, Polarware was acquired by Merit Software and the Polarware name soon disappeared.

== Legacy ==
As Merit Software moved on to newer products, rights to the old software titles were bought back from the remains of Polarware, and many of those titles were subsequently released as freeware.

Also after end of official support of their products, an enthusiast reconstructed a source code variant of the Comprehend engine to port these games to modern platforms.

== Software titles ==
Title	Author	Published
Magic Paintbrush	Mark Pelczarski	1978/1981/1984
The Complete Graphics System	Mark Pelczarski	1981
Special Effects	Mark Pelczarski and David Lubar	1981
The Complete Graphics System II	Mark Pelczarski	1982
The Graphics Magician	Mark Pelczarski, David Lubar, and Chris Jochumson	1982
Pie Man	Eagle Berns and Michael Kosaka	1982
Spy's Demise	Alan Zeldin	1982
Transylvania	Antonio Antiochia	1982/1985
Crime Wave	Scott Schram	1983
Thunderbombs	Tom Becklund	1983
The Quest	Dallas Snell, Joe Toler, and Joel Ellis Rea	1983
The Coveted Mirror	Eagle Berns and Holly Thomason	1983/1986
Expedition Amazon	Willard Phillips	1983
Bouncing Kamungas	Tom Becklund	1983
Pensate	John Besnard	1983
Transitions	Andre Schklowsky	1983
Paper Graphics	Robert Rennard	1983
Cat Graphics	David Shapiro	1983
Short Cuts	Kelly Puckett	1983
Minit Man	Greg Malone	1983
Stellar 7	Damon Slye / Dynamix	1984
The Spy Strikes Back	Robert Hardy and Mark Pelczarski	1984
Ring Quest	Dallas Snell, Joel Ellis Rea, Joe Toler, and Ron Goebel	1984
Xyphus	Robert Waller and Dave Albert	1984
Arcade Boot Camp	John Besnard	1984
Sword Of Kadash	Chris Cole / Dynamix	1984
Disk Repair Kit	David Winzler	1984
Disk Arranger	William Swanson	1984
Transylvania II: The Crimson Crown	Antonio Antiochia	1985
Oo-Topos	Michael Berlyn, Muffy Berlyn, Raimund Redlich, and Brian Poff	1985
Home Connection	William Shaw	1985
Home Data Manager	Mark Pelczarski	1985
The Spy's Adventures in Europe	Mark Pelczarski, Marsha Meuse, Elizabeth Redlich, and Brian Poff	1986
The Spy's Adventures in North America	Mark Pelczarski, Mark Glenn, Brian Poff, and Elizabeth Redlich	1986
The Spy's Adventures in South America	Mark Pelczarski, Brian Poff, and Elizabeth Redlich	1986
Electric Crayon: Fun on the Farm	Brian Rice	1986
Electric Crayon: This Land Is Your Land	Brian Rice	1986
Electric Crayon: ABC's	Brian Rice	1986
Talisman: Challenging the Sands of Time	Bruce Hoffman, Raimund Redlich, and Brian Poff	1987
Sesame Street Crayon: Letters For You	Brian Rice	1987
Sesame Street Crayon: Numbers Count	Brian Rice	1987
Sesame Street Crayon: Opposites Attract	Brian Rice	1987
The Spy's Adventures in Europe		1987
Electric Crayon Deluxe: Dinosaurs Are Forever	Brian Rice	1988
All Dogs Go to Heaven	Michael Robert Hausman	1989
Electric Crayon Deluxe: At the Zoo	Brian Rice	1989
Transylvania III: Vanquish the Night	Antonio Antiochia	1990

== General References ==
- "Polarware Archive site".
- "The Softalk Apple Project".
- "Penguin Software/Polarware". Apple2Online.
- "Penguin Software gallery". Museum of Computer Adventure Game History.
- "Penguin Software Collection". International Center for the History of Electronic Games, Strong National Museum of Play. 24 June 2015.
- "Polarware Company Profile". MobyGames.
- More Apple II games from Penguin Software from the Apple II World site (Japanese website, archived)
