= Sirius Software =

Video game publisher

Sirius Software was a California-based publisher of video games for the Apple II, Atari 8-bit computers, Commodore 64, and VIC-20. Most games were written for the Apple II, then ported to other systems. The company was founded in 1980 by Jerry Jewell and Terry Bradley and released over 160 games before folding in 1984. Sirius also developed games for the Atari 2600 which were published in 1982 and 1983 by 20th Century Fox Video Games. Fox's failure to pay Sirius resulted in company's downfall. Nasir Gebelli wrote some of the early hits from Sirius, establishing his reputation as an Apple II game programmer.

== History ==
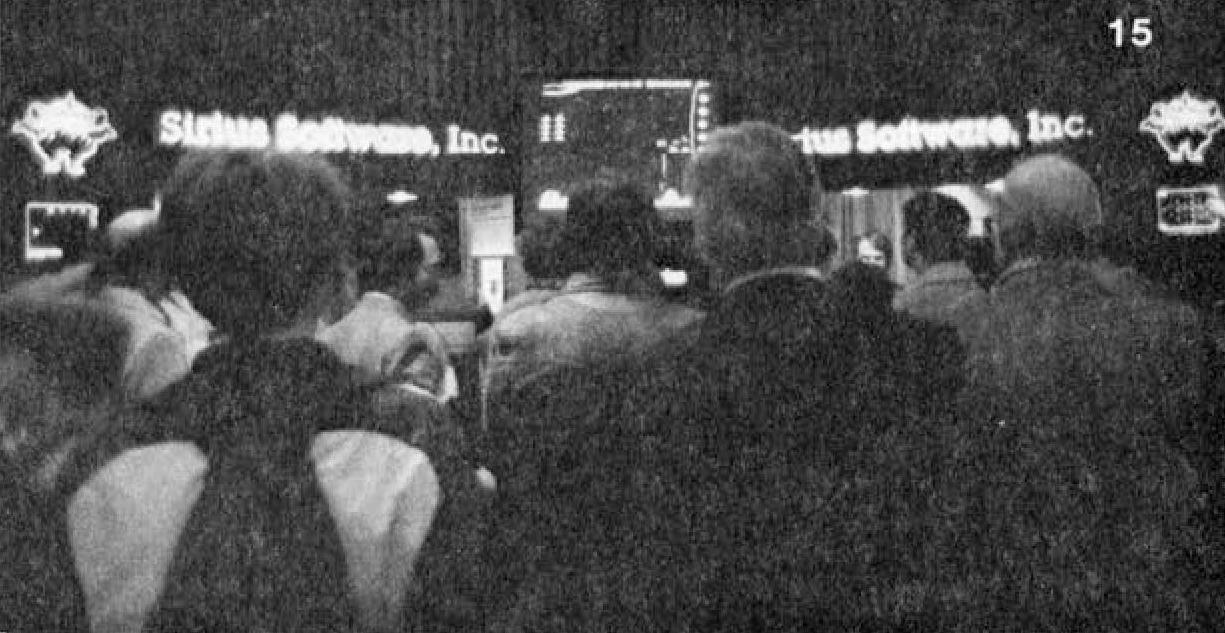
Sirius Software at the 1982 West Coast Computer Faire

The company was founded in 1980 by Jerry Jewell and Terry Bradley. It gained attention for its dramatically quick rise to prominence and its equally quick collapse in 1984 after 20th Century Fox (Fox Video Games) failed to pay over US$18 Million in owed royalties. Sirius Software designed and marketed more than 160 computer video games, software products and hardware devices worldwide. Jewell was profiled by author Steven Levy in his book Hackers.

Sirius' quick rise was due in part to a chain of hits by programmer Nasir Gebelli. Gebelli's breakthrough game was Gorgon, which brought the gameplay of the arcade's Defender to the Apple II. His technical ability and Jewell's sales and marketing skills combined to create in a single year a multimillion-dollar enterprise operating out of a rented apartment. By June 1982 the game had sold 23,000 copies, making it one of the best-selling computer games at the time. By early 1984 InfoWorld estimated that Sirius was the world's 15th-largest microcomputer-software company, with $11 million in 1983 sales.

Sirius also published a line of graphical adventure games in an attempt to compete with Sierra On-Line, but without much success. Most of the company's games were launched on the Apple II line of computers, but they also released some for the Atari 8-bit computers, Commodore 64, and VIC-20.

The Smithsonian Museum produced a "living history" video of Jewell's role in the early personal computer industry.

== Games ==
Action
- Both Barrels (1980)
- Cyber Strike (1980)
- Phantoms Five (1980)
- Star Cruiser (1980)
- Autobahn (1981)
- Beer Run (1981)
- Epoch (1981)
- Gamma Goblins (1981)
- Gorgon (1981)
- Minotaur (1981)
- Outpost (1981)
- Pulsar II (1981)
- Sneakers (1981)
- Space Eggs (1981)
- Bandits (1982)
- Free Fall (1982)
- Lemmings (1982)
- Snake Byte (1982)
- Type Attack (1982)
- Wayout (1982)
- Buzzard Bait (1983)
- Capture the Flag (1983)
- Copts and Robbers (1983)
- Final Orbit (1983)
- Moogles (1983)
- Plasmania (1983)
- Repton (1983)
- Squish 'em (1983)
- Wavy Navy (1983)

Adventure

- The Blade of Blackpoole (1982)
- Critical Mass (1982)
- Escape from Rungistan (1982)
- Kabul Spy (1982)
- Gruds in Space (1983)
- Alpine Encounter (1985)

Strategy

- Cyclod (1981)
- Dark Forest (1981)
- Call to Arms (1982)

Atari 2600

- Beany Bopper (1982)
- The Challenge of Nexar (1982)
- Deadly Duck (1982)
- Fantastic Voyage (1982)
- Fast Eddie (1982)
- Turmoil (1982)
- Worm War I (1982)
- Flash Gordon (1983)
- SpaceMaster X-7 (1983)
- The Earth Dies Screaming (1983)
