= Worm War I =

- Developer: Sirius Software
- Publisher: Fox Video Games
- Designer: David Lubar
- Platforms: Atari 8-bit, Atari 2600
- Release: 1982
- Genre: Shooter
- Mode: Single-player

Worm War I is an Atari 2600 game written by David Lubar and published by 20th Century Fox in 1982. It is a hybrid fixed shooter and vertically-scrolling game.

== Gameplay ==
Worm War I on Atari 2600

The game plays like a fixed shooter, with the player controlling a tank firing at giant worms. The tank auto scrolls up as the worms and blocks move down. Every time all the worms are wiped out, a new set spawns at the top of the screen. The pagoda can be shot to clear all the worms or rammed into by the tank to receive a fuel bonus. There are 99 waves with each wave starting with one worm with six at the end of the wave.
