= Fox Video Games =

Defunct American video game production company (1982-83)

- Industry: Video games
- Founded: April 1982; 44 years ago
- Defunct: 1983
- Key people: Frank O'Connell
- Products: Video games

Fox Video Games was a subsidiary of 20th Century Fox that focused on video games. It was founded in April 1982 with Frank O'Connell as president. They were one of the few companies that developed video subsidiaries in 1982 including MCA Inc., the parent company of Universal Pictures creating MCA Video Games.

A large portion of video games released by Fox Video Games were tie-in titles to various films. The company had a joint venture with Sacramento-based Sirius Software who developed over a dozen titles for the Atari 2600 for the company. While initially focusing on Atari's home video game console, they began expanding their development teams in 1983 to create games for home computers such as the VIC-20 and Atari 8-bit computers. George Williamson and John Eckhouse of the San Francisco Chronicle wrote that Fox Video Games experienced terrible financial losses by overproducing cartridges of their video game M*A*S*H (1983). 20th Century Fox left the video games industry in 1983.

Following the closure of Fox Video Games, 20th Century Fox reported a net profit of $4.9 million in the first quarter of 1984 despite a $6.8 million write-off from the games division. Terry Bradley, the co-founder of Sirius Software said that after Fox Video Games left video game industry, it left their company on the brink of closure in 1984 as Sirius developed 13 games in six months for Fox Video Games while the latter company only delivered one of the contracted 18 titles.

== History ==
In June 1981, Marvin Davis had acquired 20th Century Fox for over $700 million. Frank O'Connell, the former Senior Vice President in charge of sales and marketing for Mattel's Electronics division around the time Intellivision was first introduced met with Davis in January 1982. O'Connell said that for Fox, video games were not on their radar as they were more concerned about the home video and cable rights of their properties at the time. Following their meeting, O'Connell was contacted by Fox and signed a $5 million deal that turned O'Connell's Santa Clara start-up called Elite Capital Partners into Fox Video Games.

20th Century Fox formed Fox Video Games Inc. in April 1982 to produce video games for the Atari Video Computer System (later known as the Atari 2600). The president of the company was Frank O'Connell, a former Senior Vice President in charge of sales and marketing for Mattel's Electronics division around the time Intellivision was first introduced. In the same year, other film companies announced video game companies, such as MCA Inc., the parent company of Universal Pictures creating MCA Video Games. Aljean Harmetz of The New York Times described Twentieth Century Fox, and other film studios into video games as Hollywood "cashing in on the video game boom." in 1981, which was when home video game consoles and arcade games were an $8 billion business, while audiences paid less than $3 billion at American film box offices. According to Joseph LaBonte, then the president of Twentieth Century Fox, their game company would ship four games by late July. Fox Video Games had a joint venture with Sacramento-based Sirius Software. Sirius was contracted with Fox Video Games to develop 12 games for the Atari 2600. Fox, in turn, was to develop 12 games adaptable to personal computers that would be marked by Sirius with each company taking royalties on sales. Part of Fox Video Games initial line of games was to adopt titles from films. O'Connell explained the brand awareness was key for Fox Video Games, saying that developing a game yourself that nobody knew anything about had you starting at zero, but having a known television and film properties, you already knew their strengths and who they appealed to. These included video games such as Alien (1982), Megaforce and Fantastic Voyage that were set for release by the end of 1982.

O'Connell described the Atari 2600 hardware as being "restrictive", which had the company have a programmer to also act as the game designer and said that with newer game hardware release, that Fox Video Games were moving towards a team-based development approach. By mid-1983, Fox Video Games added sound and graphic specialists into their development teams in an effort to expand their capabilities for game development for personal computers and the ColecoVision. While initially planning to develop game cartridges for the Atari 2600,, by December 1982, Fox Video Games announced it would expand to home computers and released games such as Worm War I for the Atari 8-bit computers and Fast Eddie for the VIC-20. Fox Video Games also announced versions of their games to be released in September 1983 for the Atari 400/800 computers, a month ahead of Activision who were set to release their games River Raid and Kaboom! for the computer line. They had also planned on expanding into the Intellivision with a version of the game Porky's by late 1983. Fox Video Games cut the suggested retail of M*A*S*H (1983) from $29.95 to $14.95 in 1983. John Teets of The Houston Chronicle said that at this time, there was a massive oversupply of video games and dwindling profits. O'Connell echoed this, saying that at the time there was a "serious glut in the Atari 2600 cartridge segment" and hoped that the cut in price would stimulate sales.

In an overview of the Consumer Electronic trade show in 1983, Andrew Pollack wrote that in the previous year "everyone from Hollywood studios to food companies rushed into the video game business, causing a vast oversupply." which led to the closure of at least three companies by June 1983, such as U.S. Games. George Williamson and John Eckhouse of the San Francisco Chronicle wrote that Fox Video Games experienced terrible financial losses by overproducing cartridges of their video game M*A*S*H (1983). While O'Connell expressed interest in the digital distribution of video games being developed by Romox Inc. of San Francisco, 20th Century Fox left the video games industry in 1983.

== Aftermath ==
Following the closure of Fox Video Games, 20th Century Fox Film reported a net profit of $4.9 million in the first quarter of 1984 despite a $6.8 million write-off from the games division. Fox's profits were due to a surge in revenue from the syndication of the television shows M*A*S*H and increased pay television revenue for films like Return of the Jedi (1983) and Mr. Mom (1983).

Terry Bradley, the co-founder of Sirius said that after Fox Video Games left video game industry left them on the brink of closure in 1984. Bradley said that Sirius developed 13 games in six months while Fox Video Games did one within 18. In May 1984, the editors of Electronic Games wrote a column saluting the "Winners and Loser" of 1983, and highlighted both Fox Video Games and Sirius for publishing what was essentially the same game with Flash Gordon and Spider City.

== See also ==
- Fox Interactive
- Video game crash of 1983
