= Softalk =

US magazine

- September 1980 issue (vol. 1, no. 1)
- Circulation: 150,000
- First issue: September 1980
- Final issue: August 1984
- ISSN: 0274-9629

Softalk (ISSN 0274-9629) was an American magazine of the early 1980s that focused on the Apple II computer. Published from September 1980 through August 1984, it featured articles about hardware and software associated with the Apple II platform and the people and companies who made them. The name was originally used on a newsletter of Apple Software pioneer company, Softape, who in 1980 changed its name to Artsci Inc.

The startup capital for Softalk came from Margot Comstock, who had won on the television game show Password, along with a generous contribution after a few months from John Haller and from Comstock and Al Tommervik's second mortgage on their house. Partners William V R Smith III, William Depew contributed early office space in their Softape storeroom and arrived unexpectedly with office desks when Softalk moved into its own location.

Unlike other computer magazines that generally focused on a specific, narrow subject matter or market segment (e.g., business applications, games, or professional programming), Softalk gave broad coverage to all parts of the Apple world of the time, from programming tips to game playing, from business to home use, including computing as an industry, a hobby, a tool, a toy, and a culture. On occasion it even ran fiction.

Another characteristic of the magazine was its content authored by industry insiders. The experts in those early days chatted in their own relaxed language about the techniques and elements of their world. Bert Kersey, Beagle Bros, was one columnist; as were Doug Carlston, co-founder of Broderbund software; Mark Pelczarski, founder of Penguin Software; Bill Budge, creator of Pinball Construction Set; and Bill Depew, creator of Apple 21 and Magic Window.

A regular feature was a monthly chart of the most popular software in various categories, which was the Apple community's equivalent of the Billboard charts for pop music. Unlike most such bestseller lists, which report shipment from warehouses, not sales, Softalk's bestseller numbers were drawn from polling retail sales in computer stores throughout the world. There were also contests encouraging the participation of readers. Originally, Softalk was sent free to all registered Apple owners, but later it required paid subscription after one free year. Softalk underwent rapid expansion in its early history, with issues getting very thick (largely from advertising), but an industry slump in 1984 caught Softalk with too much unrealized revenues against heavy printing costs, which overtaxed its undercapitalized status. Rather than take the desperate path of erratic publication, the Softalk board chose to cease publication. In its 48 influential months, the original Softalk readership grew from 30,000 names loaned by Apple Computer Inc. to 250,000 readers. In its third and fourth years, Softalk achieved a place on the Folio 400 list of the nation's largest magazines.

== Related publications ==
When the IBM PC came on the market, Softalk Publishing started "'Softalk for the IBM PC."' And with the advent of the Macintosh, Softalk Publishing launched Softalk Mac, written as ST. Mac. For a few years Softalk Publishing published a magazine begun by On-Line Systems: Softline, renamed to ST. Game for its final issue.

The disk magazine Softdisk was originally partly owned by Softalk, and survived on its own.
