= List of self-booting IBM PC compatible games =

Many IBM PC compatible games released between 1981 and about 1990 were self-booting and did not use MS-DOS, IBM PC DOS, or compatible disk operating systems. The phrase "IBM PC compatible self-booting disk" is sometimes shortened to "PC booter". Self-booting disks were common for other computers as well.

These games were distributed on 5 1/4" or, later, 3 1/2", floppy disks that booted directly, meaning once they were inserted in the drive and the computer was turned on, a minimal, custom operating system on the diskette took over. This was used as a form of copy protection until it became obsolete as games grew larger. Due to bit rot, original working versions of these floppy disks are rare. Some have been ported to other operating systems.

Title	Released	Genre	Publisher/developer
3-K Trivia	1984	Strategy	IBM
Ace of Aces	1986	Combat flight simulator	Accolade / Artech
Agent USA	1984	Adventure / strategy	Scholastic / Tom Snyder Productions
Alley Cat	1984	Platform	IBM / Synapse Software
The Alpine Encounter	1985	Adventure	Random House
Amnesia	1986	Adventure	Electronic Arts
Apple Panic	1982	Platform	Broderbund
Archon: The Light and the Dark	1984	Strategy	Electronic Arts / Free Fall Associates
Attack On Altair	1983	Action	Windmill Software
Bannercatch	1984	Action	Scholastic
Battlezone	1983	Action	Atarisoft
B.C.'s Quest for Tires	1984	Action	Sierra On-line / Sydney Development
Below the Root	1984	Adventure	Windham Classics / Dale Disharoon
Beneath Apple Manor	1983	RPG	Quality Software
Beyond Castle Wolfenstein	1984	Stealth	Muse Software
Big Top	1983	Platform	Funtastic / Michael Abrash
The Black Cauldron	1986	Adventure	Sierra On-line
Borrowed Time	1985	Adventure	Activision / Interplay
Boulder Dash	1984	Puzzle	First Star Software
Boulder Dash II	1985	Puzzle	First Star Software
Bruce Lee	1984	Platform	Datasoft
Buck Rogers: Planet of Zoom	1984	Action	Sega
Buggy Ranger	1988	Arcade	Dinamic Software / Iron Byte
BurgerTime	1983	Platform	Mattel Electronics
Buzzard Bait	1983	Fixed Shooter	SIRIUS
Centipede	1983	Action	Atarisoft
Championship Lode Runner	1984	Platform	Broderbund Software
Chess88	1984	Board game	Unknown
Climber 5	1987	Platform	COMPUTE! Publications
Commando	1987	Run and gun	Quicksilver / Data East
Conflict in Vietnam	1986	Simulation	MicroProse
Congo Bongo	1984	Isometric platformer	Sega
Conquest	1983	Platform	Windmill Software
Cosmic Crusader	1982	Fixed shooter	Funtastic / Michael Abrash
Crossfire	1982	Action	Sierra On-Line
Crusade in Europe	1985	Simulation	MicroProse
Crypto Cube	1983	Puzzle	DesignWare
Cutthroats	1984	Interactive fiction	Infocom
Cyborg	1982	Interactive fiction	Sentient / Softsmith
Czorian Siege	1983	Action	Computer Applications Unlimited / Howard W. Sams
Deadline	1982	Interactive fiction	Infocom
Decision in the Desert	1985	Simulation	MicroProse
Defender	1983	Scrolling shooter	Atarisoft
Defender of the Crown	1987	Strategy game	Master Designer Software / Mirrorsoft
Demon Attack	1982	Fixed shooter	Imagic
Demon's Forge	1987	Adventure	Saber Software
Destroyer	1986	Simulation	Epyx
Dig Dug	1982	Maze	Atarisoft
Digger	1983	Action	Windmill Software
Donald Duck's Playground	1986	Educational	Sierra On-Line
Donkey Kong	1982	Platform	Atarisoft
Dr. J and Larry Bird Go One on One	1983	Sports	Electronic Arts
Dunjonquest: Morloc's Tower	1983	Dungeon crawl	Epyx / Automated Simulations
Earthly Delights	1983	Adventure	Datamost
Eden Blues	1987	Adventure	ERE Informatique
Enchanter	1986	Interactive fiction	Infocom
Evolution	1982	Action	Sydney Development Corporation
Executive Suite	1982	Life simulation	Armonk Corporation
The Exterminator	1982	Action	Nufekop / Bubble Bus
F-15 Strike Eagle	1984	Combat flight simulator	MicroProse
FaceMaker	1982	Educational	DesignWare / Spinnaker
Five-a-Side Indoor Soccer	1986	Sports	Mastertronic Group
Fleet Sweep	1983	Action	Mirror Images
Floppy Frenzy	1982	Action	Windmill Software
Forbidden Castle	1985	Adventure	Angelsoft / Mindscape
Forbidden Quest	1983	Adventure	Pryority Software
The Fourth Protocol	1985	Adventure	Electronic Pencil Company / Hutchinson Computer Publishing
Freddy Fish	1983	Action	Mirror Images
Freddy Hardest	1988	Platform	Dinamic Software
Freddy Hardest in South Manhattan	1989	Platform	Dinamic Software/ Iron Byte
FriendlyWare P.C. Action	1983	Action	FriendlySoft
FriendlyWare PC Introductory Set	1983	Action	FriendlySoft
Frogger	1983	Action	Sierra On-Line
Frogger II: ThreeeDeep!	1984	Action	Sega
Full Count Baseball	1984	Sports	Lance Haffner Games
Galactic Gladiators	1983	Tactical combat	Strategic Simulations
Galaxian	1983	Fixed shooter	Atarisoft
Game Over	1987	Run and gun	Dinamic Software / Imagine Software
Game Over II	1987	Shoot 'em up	Dinamic Software
Gamma Force in Pit of a Thousand Screams	1988	Interactive fiction	Tom Snyder Productions / Infocom
Ghostbusters	1986	Miscellaneous	Activision
Gremlins	1984	Fixed shooter	Atarisoft
Guerrilla War	1987	Run and gun	Quicksilver / Data East
Hacker II: The Doomsday Papers	1986	Puzzle / strategy	Activision
Hard Hat Mack	1984	Platform game	Electronic Arts
Harrier Combat Simulator	1987	Simulation	Mindscape
HellCat Ace	1984	First person shooter	MicroProse
High Stakes	1986	Card game	Angelsoft / Mindscape
The Hitchhiker's Guide to the Galaxy	1984	Interactive fiction	Infocom
The Hobbit	1983	Interactive fiction	Beam Software / Melbourne House
The Holy Grail	1984	Adventure	Hayden Software
I, Damiano: The Wizard of Partestrada	1985	Interactive fiction	Imagic / Bantam Software
Ikari Warriors	1987	Run and gun	Quicksilver / Data East
Ikari Warriors II: Victory Road	1988	Run and gun	Quicksilver / Data East
Indianapolis 500: The Simulation	1989	Racing	Electronic Arts
Infidel	1983	Interactive fiction	Infocom
International Hockey	1987	Sports	Artworx / Superior Quality Software
J-Bird	1983	Puzzle	Orion Software
James Bond 007: Goldfinger	1986	Interactive fiction	Angelsoft / Mindscape
Jet	1985	Simulation	Sublogic
John Elway's Quarterback	1988	Sports	Leland / Melbourne House
Joust	1983	Platform	Atarisoft
Jumpman	1984	Platform / puzzle	Epyx, IBM
Jungle Hunt	1983	Action	Atarisoft
Karnov	1989	Platform	Quicksilver / Data East
Kindercomp	1983	Educational	Spinnaker
King's Quest: Quest for the Crown	1984	Adventure	Sierra On-Line
King's Quest II: Romancing the Throne	1985	Adventure	Sierra On-Line
Kobyashi Naru	1987	Adventure	Mastertronic
Lane Mastodon vs. the Blubbermen	1988	Adventure	Tom Snyder Productions / Infocom
Livingstone supongo	1987	Action	Opera Soft
Livingstone supongo II	1989	Action	Opera Soft
Lock-On	1987	First person shooter	Tatsumi Electronics, Data East
Lode Runner	1983	Platform / puzzle	Broderbund / Ariolasoft
M.U.L.E.	1983	Strategy	Electronic Arts, K-Byte
Marble Madness	1986	Platform / racing	Broderbund, Ariolasoft
Master Miner	1983	Action	Funtastic
Math Maze	1983	Racing	DesignWare
Metropolis	1987	Simulation	Arcadia Systems, Melbourne House
MicroLeague Baseball	1984	Sports	MicroLeague
Microsoft Adventure	1981	Interactive fiction	Microsoft, IBM
Microsoft Decathlon	1982	Sports	Microsoft, IBM
Microsoft Flight Simulator 1.0	1982	Simulation	Sublogic / Microsoft
Microsoft Flight Simulator 2.0	1984	Simulation	Sublogic / Microsoft
Mindshadow	1984	Adventure	Interplay / Activision
Mine Shaft	1983	Puzzle	Sierra On-Line, IBM
Miner 2049er	1983	Platform	Big Five Software / Micro Fun
Montezuma's Revenge	1984	Platform	BCI Software
Moon Bugs	1983	Action	Windmill Software
Moon Patrol	1983	Scrolling shooter	Atarisoft
Morloc's Tower	1983	Adventure	Automated Simulations
Mouser	1983	Platform / puzzle	Gebelli Software, IBM
Ms. Pac-Man	1983	Maze	Atarisoft
Mundial de Fútbol	1990	Sports	Opera Sports, Opera Soft
Murder on the Zinderneuf	1984	Adventure	Free Fall Associates, Electronic Arts
Narco Police	1989	Action / shooter	Iron Byte, Dinamic Software
Night Mission Pinball	1982	Pinball	Sublogic
Night Stalker	1983	Maze	Mattel Electronics
Oil's Well	1984	Maze	Sierra On-Line
Pac-Man	1983	Maze	Atarisoft
Paratrooper	1982	Shooter	Greg Kuperberg, Orion Software
PC Arcade	1983	Action	Friendlysoft
PC Pool	1983	Sports	Hesware, IBM
PC Pool Challenges	1984	Sports	Hesware, IBM
PC-Man	1982	Maze	Orion Software
Pinball Construction Set	1985	Pinball	Electronic Arts
Pitfall II: Lost Caverns	1984	Platform	Activision
Pitstop II	1984	Racing	Synergistic Software, Epyx
Planetfall	1983	Interactive fiction	Infocom
Portal	1986	RPG	Nexa Corporation, Activision
Prowler	1987	Simulation	Icon Design Ltd., Mastertronic
Psi-5 Trading Company	1986	Strategy	Accolade
Rasterscan	1987	Puzzle	Binary Design, Mastertronic
Rescue at Rigel	1983	RPG	Epyx
Rescate en el Golfo	1991	Shooter	Opera Soft
River Raid	1984	Scrolling shooter	Activision
Robotron: 2084	1983	Fixed shooter	Atarisoft
Rockford	1988	Arcade	Arcadia Systems
Rollo and the Brush Bros.	1983	Puzzle	Windmill Software
Satan	1990	Platform	Dinamic Software
ScubaVenture	1983	Action	Gebelli Software, IBM
Seastalker	1984	Interactive fiction	Infocom
Serpentine	1982	Action	Broderbund
Sol Negro	1988	Arcade	Opera Soft
The Seven Cities of Gold	1987	Adventure	Ozark Softscape, Electronic Arts
Shamus	1984	Action	William Mataga, Synapse Software
Sherlock Holmes: Another Bow	1985	Adventure	Imagic, Bantam Software
Sid Meier's Pirates!	1987	Action / adventure	MicroProse
Sidewinder	1988	Shoot 'em up	Synergistic Software, Arcadia Systems
Sierra Championship Boxing	1985	Sports	Evryware, Sierra On-Line
Silent Service	1986	Submarine simulator	MicroProse
The Slugger	1988	Sports	Ocean Software, Mastertronic
Snack Attack II	1982	Maze	Funtastic
Solo Flight	1983	Simulation	MicroProse
Solomon's Key	1988	Puzzle	U.S. Gold
Sorcerer	1984	Interactive fiction	Infocom
Space Strike	1982	Action	Michael Abrash, Datamost
Spellicopter	1983	Edutainment	DesignWare
Spiderbot	1988	Platform	Addictive Games, Epyx
Spitfire Ace	1984	Flying shooter	MicroProse
Spy Hunter	1984	Vehicular combat	Sega
Starcross	1982	Interactive fiction	Infocom
Stargate	1983	Scrolling shooter	Atarisoft
Storm	1987	Puzzle	Mastertronic
Strategy Games	1983	Strategy	IBM
Styx	1983	Puzzle	Windmill Software
Sub Mission	1987	Shooter	Tom Snyder Productions, Mindscape
Summer Games II	1986	Sports	Epyx
Super Boulder Dash	1986	Action	First Star Software, Electronic Arts
Super Football Sunday	1985	Sports	Quest / Avalon Hill
Super Zaxxon	1984	Shoot 'em up	Sega
Suspect	1984	Interactive fiction	Infocom
Suspended	1983	Interactive fiction	Infocom
Tag Team Wrestling	1985	Sports	Quicksilver / Data East
Tapper	1983	Action	Bally Midway
Tass Times in Tonetown	1986	Adventure	Brainwave Creations / Interplay, Activision
The Last Mission	1987	Action	Opera Soft
Timothy Leary's Mind Mirror	1986	Interactive fiction	Futique, Electronic Arts
Touchdown Football	1984	Sports	Imagic, IBM
The Tracer Sanction	1984	Adventure	Interplay / Activision
Trilogy	1987	Adventure	Mastertronic
Trivia 101	1984	Educational	Digital Learning Systems, IBM
Troll's Tale	1984	Adventure	Sierra On-Line
TV and Cinema 101: Trivia from Talkies to Trekkies	1984	Game show	Digital Learning Systems, IBM
Ulysses and the Golden Fleece	1982	Hi-res adventure	Sierra On-Line
Up'n Down	1984	Platform	Sega Enterprise, Ltd.
Voodoo Island	1985	Interactive fiction	Angelsoft / Mindscape
Warrior of Ras: Volume I - Dunzhin	1982	RPG	Intelligent Statements Inc., Computer Applications Unlimited
Will Harvey's Music Construction Set	1984	Educational	Electronic Arts
Winter Games	1986	Sports	Epyx
The Witness	1983	Interactive fiction	Infocom
Wizard and the Princess	1982	Adventure	On-Line Systems
Wizardry: Proving Grounds of the Mad Overlord	1984	RPG	Sir-Tech
Wizardry II: The Knight of Diamonds	1985	RPG	Sir-Tech
Wizardry III: Legacy of Llylgamyn	1986	RPG	Sir-Tech
Wizardry IV: The Return of Werdna	1987	RPG	Sir-Tech
Wizardry V: Heart of the Maelstrom	1988	RPG	Sir-Tech
Wizball	1987	Shoot 'em up	Sensible Software, Ocean Software
Word Spinner	1984	Educational	The Learning Company
World Games	1986	Sports	K-Byte / Epyx
World Karate Championship	1986	Fighting	Epyx / System 3
The World's Greatest Baseball Game	1985	Sports	Quest Inc., Epyx
Zaxxon	1984	Action	Sega
Zork: The Great Underground Empire	1982	Interactive fiction	Infocom
Zork II: The Wizard of Frobozz	1983	Interactive fiction	Infocom
Zork III: The Dungeon Master	1984	Interactive fiction	Infocom
ZorkQuest: Assault on Egreth Castle	1988	Adventure	Tom Snyder Productions / Infocom
ZorkQuest: The Crystal of Doom	1989	Adventure	Tom Snyder Productions / Infocom
Zyll	1984	Interactive fiction	IBM
