= Snack (disambiguation) =

A snack is a type of meal.

Snack(s) may also refer to

- Snacks (EP), a 2018 release by Jax Jones
- Snacks (Supersize), a 2019 album by Jax Jones
- "Snack" (song), a 2020 song by Keke Palmer
- Cadbury Snack, a biscuit brand
- SNACK Benefit Concert, a 1975 concert in San Francisco
- Damon Harrison (born 1988), American football player nicknamed "Snacks"
- Snacks, a podcast hosted by Sam Mewis and Lynn Williams for Just Women's Sports

== See also ==
- Midnight Snack (disambiguation)
- Scooby Snacks (disambiguation)
- Snack Attack (disambiguation)
- Snacking (disambiguation)
- SNAC (disambiguation)
