= Murder on the Zinderneuf =

1983 video game

- Developer: Free Fall Associates
- Publishers: NA: Electronic Arts; EU: Ariolasoft
- Designers: Jon Freeman; Paul Reiche III
- Programmers: Robert Leyland; Alan Pavlish (Apple II)
- Platforms: Apple II, Commodore 64, Atari 8-bit, IBM PC
- Release: 1983
- Genre: Adventure
- Mode: Single-player

Murder on the Zinderneuf is a video game designed by Jon Freeman and Paul Reiche III and one of the first six games published by Electronic Arts in 1983 (Ariolasoft in Europe). It was developed for the Apple II, Commodore 64, Atari 8-bit computers, and IBM PC (as a self-booting disk).

The Apple II version was programmed by Alan Pavlish of Designer Software. All other versions were programmed by Robert Leyland. The Commodore 64 version states it was by Mission Accomplished Software Services, Inc., but also gives credit to Leyland for programming.

== Plot ==
The game is set in 1936. The player is a detective traveling across the Atlantic aboard the world's most luxurious dirigible, the Zinderneuf. The craft is full of high-profile personalities from all walks of life. A murder takes place aboard the Zinderneuf, and it is up to the player to identify the culprit before the ship lands.

== Gameplay ==
Gameplay screenshot (Atari 8-bit)

The game presents a classic whodunit scenario where one of the 16 passengers has been killed, and the player's objective is to identify the murderer, the victim, and the motive.

At the beginning of each game, the victim and murderer are randomly selected, ensuring a unique mystery with every playthrough. Players have 12 in-game hours — equating to 36 minutes of real time — to investigate and make an accusation. Failure to solve the case within this time frame results in the murderer escaping justice.

The player is given a choice of eight detectives to play. Among the detectives are a former policeman turned private detective Harry Hacksaw (based on Dirty Harry), French police inspector Emile Klutzeau (based on Inspector Clouseau), amateur sleuth Agatha Marbles (based on Miss Marple), German-British detective Humbolt Hause (based on Sherlock Holmes), NYPD Lieutenant Cincinnato (based on Columbo), mysterious adventurer Charity Flaire (based on Modesty Blaise), Swiss detective Achille Merlot (based on Hercule Poirot), and gentleman thief Jethro Knight (based on Simon Templar).

The gameplay involves navigating a scrolling overhead plan of the airship using a joystick. The Zinderneuf is depicted as a large vessel with various locations, including passenger cabins, lounges, and dining areas. Players can enter cabins to search for physical clues and encounter other passengers who move independently throughout the ship. Engaging with suspects involves a menu system where players decide whether to ignore, accuse, or question individuals, and select the manner of questioning. Each detective possesses a distinct interrogation style that influences interactions with suspects. For example, Agatha Marbles can use approaches such as being stern, sympathetic, helpless, or polite during questioning.

As the investigation unfolds, players uncover a complex web of relationships and motives among the passengers. Once they are satisfied that they have a culprit, the detective has the option of accusing them directly, or waiting until enough clues are found to prove their hunch. If they are wrong, the person they have accused will not speak to them for the remainder of the game. A denial does not always mean the detective is wrong, only that more proof is required for the murderer to confess.

If the detective is correct, the killer will explain the motives behind their crime, and the detective is given one of six ratings based on the effectiveness of their investigation.

== Packaging ==
The Commodore 64 release by Electronic Arts includes a booklet detailing the backgrounds of the detectives and passengers. This information provides context and aids players in their investigative strategies.

== Development ==
Designer Jon Freeman stated in the December 1980 BYTE that "a game like Adventure is really a puzzle that, once solved, is without further interest"; by contrast, he wrote, computer role-playing games like his Dunjonquest series offer unpredictable play and replay opportunities. Freeman said that Murder on the Zinderneuf was a homage to Cluedo, but there are obvious influences from books and movies in the mystery genre, ranging from Agatha Christie's Miss Marple and Hercule Poirot books, to Sherlock Holmes and the films of Humphrey Bogart. A number of famous personalities from the 1930s may also have inspired the creation of the passengers aboard the Zinderneuf, such as Veronica Lake (Veronica Marlowe), Johnny Weissmuller (Buck Battle), and Hedda Hopper (Margaret Vandergilt).

== Reception ==
The Atari 8-bit version of Murder on the Zinderneuf was reviewed by Video magazine in its "Arcade Alley" column. Reviewers called it "as entertaining as it is innovative", and described it as "one of the most distinctive titles to be published [in 1983]". Specific praise was given the game's replay option which offers a different fact pattern for each playthrough. InfoWorld's Essential Guide to Atari Computers recommended the game as among the best adventure games for the Atari 8-bit, and predicted that others would emulate its "especially clever" joystick interface.

Allen Doum of Computer Gaming World stated that "Murder on the Zinderneuf is a mystery game for those people who don't have time for a twelve-hour deadline". The magazine's David and Diana Stone were impressed with Murder on the Zinderneuf's 1930s characters, each with colorful, easily distinguished graphics. They liked the attention to particular details, such as the engine noise increasing as the player moves towards the back of the zeppelin. In addition to the game being fair and winnable, the reviewers reported playing it 20 times and only seeing two repeat "confessions".

Computer & Video Games review offered a positive assessment of Murder on the Zinderneuf for the Commodore 64, praising the colorful cast of passengers, whose intricate relationships provide ample motives and enhance the mystery, and the game's variability, likening it to Cluedo. Review found the game's interface to be effective and user-friendly. Technical performance is also noted positively. Additionally, the reviewer lauded the game's packaging, emphasizing the comprehensive booklet included.

Softline stated that Free Fall "came up with a game that's every bit as delightful as Archon". Ahoy! called Murder on the Zinderneuf "the most intriguing mystery game I have ever played ... for a mystery fan it is a dream come true". PC Magazine gave the game 15 points out of 18, noting the importance of acting in accordance with the chosen detective character's personality when questioning suspects.
