= Tax Dodge (video game) =

1982 video game

- Developer: Free Fall Associates
- Publisher: Island Graphics
- Designers: Jon Freeman; Anne Westfall
- Platform: Atari 8-bit
- Release: 1982
- Genre: Maze

Tax Dodge is a maze video game for Atari 8-bit computers published by Island Graphics in 1982. It is the first game created by Free Fall Associates, a developer best known for Archon: The Light and the Dark.

== Gameplay ==
Tax Dodge is a game in which the player navigates a maze collecting the stacks of coins. Having accumulated money, the player then tries to keep as much of it as possible out of the hands of four tax agents who are in constant pursuit.

== Development ==
When asked about the genesis of the concept, designer Jon Freeman replied:

we wanted to create a few maze games that weren't Pac-Man clones. The subject matter came from spending too much time doing our taxes, and the details were there partly to illustrate the absurdities of the tax code. The layout was designed to combine the Atari 800's scrolling capabilities with the feel of a board game.

== Reception ==
Allen Doum reviewed the game for Computer Gaming World, and stated that "As a game, Tax Dodge starts easy but becomes quite difficult starting with the fourth year. From there on out, players are going to have to work out patterns and, tricks to stay in the game. My only real complaint is that it seems much harder to 'corner' in this game than in most games — even with practice. Tax Dodge is a good, solid game that makes the most of its' [sic] theme and somewhat overdone play mechanics."

Jon Freeman, of Free Fall Associates, said that the game appealed to adults, "but the average young gamer just didn't get it."
