= Snack Attack (disambiguation) =

Snack Attack is a 1981 maze action video game.

Snack Attack may also refer to:

- Snack Attack (FIRST), a challenge theme for Food Factor
- Snack Attack II, a 1982 Pac-Man-inspired maze game
- Ismism, a 1981 album by Godley & Creme released in the US under the name Snack Attack

== See also ==
- Stack Attack
- Shakatak
