= Master Miner =

1983 video game

- Developer: Dan Illowsky
- Publisher: Funtastic
- Platform: IBM PC
- Release: 1983
- Genre: Maze
- Mode: Single-player

Master Miner is a maze shooter for IBM PC compatibles released as a self-booting disk by Funtastic in 1983. It was written by Dan Illowsky who previously wrote Snack Attack for the Apple II. The game involves collecting diamonds while avoiding bandits.
