= Snax (disambiguation) =

Snax (born 1969) is an American musician and DJ.

Snax may also refer to:

- Snax (gamer), professional Counter-Strike player Janusz Pogorzelski
- Path Finder or SNAX, a Macintosh file browser
- Assis Airport's ICAO code

== See also ==
- Snacking (disambiguation)
- Snacks
- Snaxxx, a 2012 album by Mike Mictlan
