= Archon II: Adept =

1984 video game

- Developer: Free Fall Associates
- Publishers: NA: Electronic Arts; EU: Ariolasoft
- Designers: Jon Freeman; Paul Reiche III; Anne Westfall
- Platforms: Amiga, Amstrad CPC, Apple II, Atari 8-bit, Commodore 64, ZX Spectrum
- Release: 1984
- Genres: Turn-based strategy, action
- Modes: Single-player, multiplayer

Archon II: Adept is a strategy/action video game developed by Free Fall Associates: Jon Freeman, Paul Reiche III, and Anne Westfall. It was published in 1984 by Electronic Arts for the Atari 8-bit computers and Commodore 64. Ports followed for the Apple II, Amstrad CPC, ZX Spectrum, and Amiga.

Archon II is played in turns on a game board, except that when a piece lands on an opposing piece, both are moved to a battle arena where they duel to the death in a real-time action sequence. It is the sequel to the 1983 Archon: The Light and the Dark.

== Gameplay ==
The goal of Adept is to occupy all six power points located on the board, eliminate all opposing pieces, or win Apocalypse, a sudden death battle using pieces that base their strengths on the state of the board. Conversely, a player who is unable to make a move during their turn loses instantly. The game can be played with two players or one player against a computer, with options to choose or randomize sides and set handicaps.

The game board is laid out in concentric bands of Fire, Air, Water, and Earth, two Void squares, and two decorative citadels. "Order" (yellow pieces, right) and "Chaos" (blue pieces, left) each start with four spellcaster "Adepts" which can place other pieces into play.

Game board (C64). Order's magical power is displayed in a bar on the left. Some power points are not visible due to a flickering effect.

On a turn, a player must move a piece or use an Adept to cast a spell. An Adept may teleport anywhere on the board. Other pieces may move any number of squares in their elemental band, or one square in any direction. Neither may enter occupied squares, save to initiate combat by ending the turn on an opposing piece. An Adept on an elemental band may target a spell onto any square on the same band. When using the summoning spell to place another piece into play, that piece can be placed onto any empty square on the band or, for an additional cost, directly onto a piece the opponent has summoned to trigger a battle immediately.

Adept, unlike the first Archon, involves accumulating and spending a resource in the form of magical power. Magic is gained by having pieces on power points, four of which lie on the outer edges of one elemental band at a time and cycle one step inward after each player has taken their turn. Two power points with lower income are stationary on the Void squares. The side that goes second also starts with additional magic. Magic is spent as an Adept moves or casts a spell, and as a per-turn upkeep cost for summoned pieces. The summoning spell places a piece belonging to one of either four types common to both sides ("Demons") or four types specific to each ("Elementals") on the board. The costs of summoning, maintaining, and affecting a piece with other spells vary per type, and there are no limitations on placing the same type of piece multiple times or on opposite sides. Adepts can also cast spells to heal Adepts or summoned pieces, or to damage, freeze or unfreeze (with the freezing player taking on the upkeep cost), or remove summoned pieces. A player who has accumulated a great deal of magic can cast Apocalypse, making the citadels uproot, transform into luminous Adepts and face each other in a Void arena to decide the game.

The computer can concede to a human player, typically when down to a single Adept with no magical power to summon new pieces for several turns. If a player loses their last Adept but has one or more other pieces remaining, "the Masters intervene" triggering Apocalypse.

=== Combat ===
Pieces in battle are moved to an arena where their owners control them. Pieces can move and attack in eight directions. A chime sounds (higher for Order, lower for Chaos) when their attack has recharged. Attacks that land decrease the target's life bar. Once a life bar is depleted, the piece dies and is removed from the game. The survivor is returned to the board, its injuries persisting. Combat can end in a draw if both pieces die.

In Archon, a piece would either have a melee attack, a projectile, or deal damage in an area around itself. Adept elaborates on this. Chimeras cycle between two different projectiles and a melee attack, juggernauts transform to and from their own projectiles, and krakens' projectiles lose strength as they travel. Adepts can switch between moving the piece and guiding its projectile in flight, sirens must keep stationary to sing but automatically damage opponents as they do, and gorgons sap speed instead of health. The previous game's area-attacking pieces, phoenix and banshee, are revisited as firebirds, which can abort attacks, and wraiths, which drain health and are invisible save as they attack or reload (or against computer opponents). During Apocalypse, each side's health, attack power, and projectile speed depend on their stored magic, number of pieces on the board, and number of remaining Adepts.

In Archon, the battlefield had obstacles that blocked pieces and projectiles. Adept builds on this as well. In Battles on Earth squares obstacles act as in Archon, in Water they slow, in Air they slow pieces and divert projectiles, and in Fire they admit projectiles but damage pieces. Void arenas are empty.

== Reception ==
II Computing stated that the Apple II version of Archon II "is even more challenging than its predecessor, and features exciting innovations", and concluded, "It's good to see a sequel to a successful game that is not only as good as the first but extends the boundaries of the game's system." Ahoy! said that the Commodore 64 version's graphics were as excellent as the previous game, but that gameplay was inferior as "the laudable attempt to further differentiate the game from chess simply misfires ... Adept just isn't as much fun". Reviewing the Amiga version, Computer Gaming World recommended both Archon and Adept for those interested in challenging strategy games.

== See also ==
- Archon Ultra
