= Bigtop =

Bigtop may refer to:

- Circus
- Bigtop Records
- Bigtop, a distributed operating system project from Microsoft Research

== See also ==
- Big Top
