= Swords of Twilight =

1989 video game

- Developer(s): Free Fall Associates
- Publisher(s): Electronic Arts
- Designer(s): Jon Freeman
- Composer(s): Teri Mason Christian
- Platform(s): Amiga
- Release: 1989
- Genre(s): Action role-playing
- Mode(s): Single-player, multiplayer

Swords of Twilight is a 1989 video game developed by Free Fall Associates and published by Electronic Arts for the Amiga.

== Gameplay ==
Swords of Twilight is a multi-player role-playing game in which each player character is capable of performing actions, dialogue and travel simultaneously.

== Reception ==
Douglas Seacat reviewed the game for Computer Gaming World, and stated that "the game wins my vote for CRPG of the year. One simply cannot recommend this game highly enough."
