= Space Strike =

1982 video game

- Developer: Michael Abrash
- Publisher: Datamost
- Platform: IBM PC
- Release: NA: 1982
- Genre: Fixed shooter
- Mode: Single-player

Space Strike is a 1982 fixed shooter video game for IBM PC compatibles programmed by Michael Abrash and published by Datamost. Space Strike is a clone of Space Invaders. It was distributed as a self-booting disk.

== Gameplay ==
As in Space Invaders, the player controls a small mobile firing platform that he moves side to side along the bottom of the screen. Waves of aliens attack from above, sweeping back and forth and slowly descending. Barriers provide cover for the player, but are degraded by weapons fire both from above and from below. The level is complete when all the aliens are destroyed, but ends if the player gets shot or if the aliens descend to the point that they collide with the player.

== Reception ==
Mark Lacine reviewed the game for Computer Gaming World, and stated that "In conclusion, Space Strike is a new name for an old game. This doesn't change the fact that it is a well programmed, error-free game. It is recommended to those who are looking for a good quality Invaders program."
