= Timothy Leary's Mind Mirror =

1985 video game

- Developer: Futique
- Publisher: Electronic Arts
- Designer: Marc Dawson
- Artist: Pete Lyon
- Platforms: Atari 8-bit, Apple II, Commodore 64, IBM PC
- Release: Atari 8-bit: NA: 1985; IBM PC: NA: May 1986; Apple II, C64: NA: June 1986
- Genre: Simulation
- Mode: Single-player

Timothy Leary's Mind Mirror is a video game developed by Futique, the studio of Timothy Leary, and published in 1985 by Electronic Arts for the Atari 8-bit computers. It was ported to the Apple II, Commodore 64, and IBM PC compatibles (as a self-booting disk). The game sold well, but received mixed reviews, with critics expressing varied opinions on the scope and applications of the game's psychological features and user-friendliness of the software's design.

Contemporary and retrospective reception has assessed the game as an unusually experimental title for early computer games, with comparisons drawn to Alter Ego (1986), a simulation game with a similar premise. Plans by Leary to create a sequel, Head Coach, never came to fruition.

== Gameplay ==
Gameplay

Gameplay in Mind Mirror occurs over several modules. The first requires the player to compare and contrast two or more personalities by rating the subjects' qualities, such as their extroversion or intelligence, on a sliding numeric scale. The program will then chart the outcomes as a personality assessment using a "Mind Map" graphic. In the second module, players can select a personality from the first module, or create a new personality, to experience a range of role-playing scenarios named Life Simulations based on four fields: Bio-Energy, Emotional Insight, Mental Abilities or Social Interaction. The software features 2,000 simulations across two disks, which can be answered in multiple choice. The game features a save system to allow players to compare how their personality has changed over time.

== Development and release ==
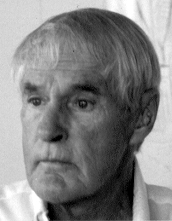
Photograph of Leary in 1989

Mind Mirror was conceived by Timothy Leary, a popular psychologist and educator notable for his experimentation and advocacy with LSD and influence on psychedelic culture. The game was developed by Futique, a team of ten writers and programmers in a partnership with Interplay. Leary's intent was to translate his written literature on psychology into interactive software to explore potential applications for education and creativity. The game's core concepts integrated aspects of Leary's research into psychology and personality, including the representation of personality features under a circumplex introduced in Leary's text The Interpersonal Diagnosis of Personality. The game's features were first developed as a set of tests taken with pencil, paper, stencils and templates. Leary intended for the software to have real-world applications, and engaged the California Family Studies Center to use the software in family guidance counselling.

Leary had plans to develop additional computer titles, including an interactive video version of Mind Mirror for LaserDisc, and a sequel to the game titled Head Coach that would include paranormal psychological elements, including telepathy and psychic abilities; none were released, and Leary died in 1996. In 2021, the game was re-released on GOG.com.

== Reception ==
Mind Mirror was moderately successful. In 1987, Electronic Arts stated that the game sold 65,000 copies, and Leary stated that the game sold well.

Reviews of the game were mixed. Several critics assessed the game in comparison to Alter Ego, a 1986 simulation game featuring similar psychological and role-playing elements. Charles Ardai of Computer Gaming World credited Leary for his efforts to translate his thoughts to a computer game, but felt his concepts were "flawed" and the game was "self-indulgent", "highly repetitive", and the role-playing gameplay was not extensive enough to offset the statistics of the game. Frank Lenk of Computing Now was a "fair amount of fun", but felt the game had several limitations: the dense use of jargon and language, poor usability and configuration with DOS, and repetition, with Lenk stating that "Mind Mirror is perhaps most interesting not as a mirror of your own mind, but rather that of its illustrious - or is that infamous - author." Bob Lindstrom of The Guide to Computer Living felt the game could have "serious applications", but the game was largely "just for fun" and featured "considerably more entertaining" writing than Alter Ego. Although noting the program was "not for everyone" and could be "intimidating" at first, Computer Entertainer considered the game had a "tremendous amount of freedom to explore feelings and concepts in ways that are open ended". Scott Thomas of Compute! felt the game was "entertaining and insightful" and examples of a "serious non-business application" for the home computer beyond the traditional video game, also identifying its potential for use as a party game.

=== Retrospective ===
Describing the game as "surprisingly extensive" in its simulation, Rock Paper Shotgun stated Mind Mirror is "filled with curiosities reflecting the counter-cultural mindset" in spite of its "outdated 60s rhetoric". Boing Boing stated the game was an "interesting counterbalance to similar text games of the era, comparing it to Alter Ego.
