= Big Top =

A big top is a large tent in which a traveling circus takes place.

Big Top may also refer to:

- Big Top (American TV series), a children's television series in the 1950s
- Big Top (British TV series), a BBC comedy series
- Big Top (video game), a 1983 computer game
- "Big Top" (Dead Zone), an episode of The Dead Zone TV series
- Bigtop Records, a record label
- Big Top (album), a 2000 album by free jazz drummer Whit Dickey
- Big Top Sydney, an entertainment and concert venue in Luna Park, Sydney
- Big Top Pee-wee, the 1988 movie with Pee-wee Herman
