= Arac (video game) =

1986 action-adventure game

- American box cover
- Publisher: Addictive Games
- Designer: Paul O'Malley
- Platforms: Apple II, Commodore 64, IBM PC
- Release: EU: 1986; NA: 1986
- Genre: Action-adventure
- Mode: Single-player

Arac (released as Spiderbot in America and Taiwan) is an action-adventure game first released for the Commodore 64 in 1986 and ported to the Apple II and IBM PC compatibles (as a self-booting disk).

== Plot ==
Deep within the Citadel, three runaway chemical reactors are rapidly approaching meltdown. These time bombs threaten to devastate the surrounding electronic jungle. The only remaining SpiderDroid has been sent into the territory of the Citadel to find and diffuse[sic] the reactors.

== Gameplay ==
Arac takes place in a side-view jungle maze, spanning 100 screens. The goal of the game is to make one's way to the reactor core within the Citadel in the center of the maze within 30 minutes; if the timer runs out, the game is over. At the beginning of the game, the player's abilities are limited; the robot can only walk left and right, jump a short distance, and shoot nets. In order to progress deeper into the maze, the player must capture enemies using a net, and utilize their abilities. Some enemies can dig through dirt, others allow the player to jump higher, and so on. In order to access the Citadel, in which the reactor is located, the player must find the hidden pieces of the robot's body, which are hidden throughout the maze. When fully assembled, the robot will be able to walk on ceilings, reverse gravity, and shoot lightning bolts, and thus enter the final area. The player also has the option of a playing a 20-minute "short" game in which the robot begins the game with its body already formed.

== Reception ==
Arac was well received by the gaming magazines of the day. C&VG gave it 9/10 for graphics, 6/10 for sound, 8/10 for value, and 8/10 for playability, criticizing the necessity of starting the whole game over again after each death and calling its sound design "below average", but praising its animations and concluding, overall, that "Arac will catch you in its web of intrigue and playability." Your Commodore gave it 8/10 for originality, 6/10 for playability, 7/10 for graphics, and 8/10 for value-for-money. Zzap! gave the game 93% overall, with all three reviewers praising it, calling it "the best arcade-adventure I have played for yonks" and "one of the more playable arcade-adventures available", and saying that, while "original and refreshing" games are rare, "Arac is one of those rarities" and that the game "is well worth the money." However, all three reviewers criticized the sparse sound design, and the overall score awarded only 10% for sound. Commodore User gave the game 8/10 overall, concluding "Graphically accomplished, instantly playable and yet addictive in the long term, if Arac falls down anywhere it is the lack of music and in relying on a stale storyline". Commodore User reviewed the game again when it was rereleased as a budget game in 1988, giving it 9/10 and saying, "Good game combined with pretty graphics and virtually no sound make Arac a serious contender for re-release of the month".
