= Sierra Championship Boxing =

1983 video game

- Developer: Evryware
- Publisher: Sierra On-Line
- Platforms: Apple II, Commodore 64, IBM PC, Mac
- Release: IBM PC: NA: 1983; Mac: NA: October 1985; C64: NA: December 1985; Apple II: NA: January 1986
- Genre: Sports
- Modes: Single-player, Multiplayer

Sierra Championship Boxing is a boxing video game that holds the Guinness World Record for "First boxing videogame with real-world boxers". It was developed by Evryware and published by Sierra On-Line in 1983. Versions were released for Apple II, Commodore 64, IBM PC compatibles (as a self-booting disk), and Mac.

== Gameplay ==
The player can control the boxer during the rounds or act as cornerman, issuing instructions between rounds. The game also allows for simulated matches with no player input. The player can choose from a roster of real fighters from different eras (but also Cartoons and boxing Kangaroos), or create a boxer with customized abilities.

== Development ==
Sierra Championship Boxing was the first PC game Evryware developed. The game was initially going to be published by Microsoft, but Microsoft decided at the last minute that the home market wasn't big enough yet. Evryware's contact at Microsoft told Ken Williams at Sierra On-Line about the game; Sierra offered Evryware a contract and published the game in 1983.

== Reception ==
InfoWorld called Sierra Championship Boxing "by far the most extensive sports game created for a microcomputer" and suggested that the game "could usher in a new era of sports simulation games" that use "the power and memory of the IBM PC and PC Jr" to store detailed information about real people. Computer Gaming World reviewed the Commodore version negatively. The reviewer praised the game's options and graphics, but criticized its lack of realism. PC Magazine gave the game 14.5 points out of 18, calling it "one of those breakthrough games that comes along ever so infrequently these days ... Championship Boxing is a knockout".
