= SNAC (disambiguation) =

SNAC (Social Networks and Archival Context) is a project collecting and integrating biographical and social data.

SNAC may also refer to:

- Scaphoid non-union advanced collapse, a medical condition of the wrist
- Somali National Academy of Culture
- Single Network Access Code, the country code for the Inmarsat satellite phone network
- Scientific Nutrition for Advanced Conditioning, a.k.a. SNAC Nutrition, a company
- Syndicat National des Auteurs et des Compositeurs, a French lobby association of authors and composers
- SNOAC, S-nitroso-N-acetylcysteine, a chemical substance
- Salcaprozate sodium, sodium N-[8-(2-hydroxybenzoyl)amino] caprylate, an excipient used in pharmaceuticals
- snoaC, a gene

== See also ==
- Snack (disambiguation)
- Snap (disambiguation)
