= Hard Hat Mack =

1983 video game

- Developer: Electronic Arts
- Publisher: Electronic Arts
- Designers: Michael Abbot; Matthew Alexander
- Platforms: Commodore 64, Atari 8-bit, Apple II, Coleco Adam, IBM PC, Amstrad CPC
- Release: October 1983: C64; NA: October 1983; EU: 1984 Atari 8-bit; NA: November 1983 Apple II; NA: 1983 Adam, IBM PC; NA: 1984 CPC; UK: 1984
- Genre: Platform
- Mode: Single-player

Hard Hat Mack is a platform game developed by Michael Abbot and Matthew Alexander for the Apple II, which was published by Electronic Arts in 1983. Ports for the Atari 8-bit computers and Commodore 64 were released simultaneously. It is part of the first batch of five games from Electronic Arts, and the company called it out as "truly EA's first game." Versions for the Amstrad CPC and IBM PC compatibles (as a self-booting disk) followed in 1984.

Though not a direct clone, Hard Hat Mack is similar in theme and gameplay to Nintendo's 1981 Donkey Kong arcade game.

== Gameplay ==
The player guides a construction worker through a series of goals, making use of open paths, springboards, conveyor belts, and elevators, taking care not to run out of time. Assuming the role of the titular Hard Hat Mack, the player has three lives.

Level One (building framework). The player must pick up loose girder pieces to fill four gaps in the floor, then capture a moving jackhammer to secure them. At the same time, the player must avoid bolts thrown from above, a wandering vandal and OSHA representative, and falling through gaps or off the edge of the building.

Level Two (construction site). The player guides Hard Hat Mack through a four-level construction site in order to collect six lunchboxes guarded by various obstacles. An enemy blocks the final hurdle, requiring a carefully timed jump. Once all the lunchboxes have been collected, the player must guide Mack up a conveyor belt so that an overhead electromagnet pulls him to safety before he can fall into an incinerator.

Level Three (factory). The player collects six boxes and drops each one into a processor. An enemy moves back and forth near one of the boxes, requiring a very careful jump. The player must avoid falling into a portable toilet at the bottom center of the screen.

At the completion of a round, the game cycles anew with faster gameplay and additional enemies.

== Reception ==
Softline stated that the Apple version of Hard Hat Mack "bears a certain similarity to Miner 2049er, but it's a good game in its own right and the animation is a little better". Video also reviewed the Apple version in its "Arcade Alley" column where it was described as "a 'must' buy for Apple arcaders" and "indisputably one of the finest programs ever made for the Apple". Reviewers noted that the game's "look and play" were inferior to the Atari version, but this was attributed to the Apple II's systemic limitations and designers Abbot and Alexander were recommended for a "round of applause" from readers.

In 1984 Softline's readers named the game the sixth most-popular Apple program of 1983. Computer Gaming World's reviewer in 1984 called the game "a brand new concept in arcade action", stating that he was unaware of another set in the construction industry. PC Magazine in 1984 gave Hard Hat Mack 10.5 points out of 18. It described the game as "computer game pop art—flashy to the eye, but hollow inside. For all of its nice touches, I quickly became bored."

In late 1983, California state senator Dan McCorquodale, offended by the portrayal of OSHA as a villain in the game, sent a complaint letter to an Emporium-Capwell store in Santa Clara, California, accusing the game of being "anti-worker" and of skewing the public perception of the federal government. As a result, six days later the store pulled Hard Hat Mack from the shelves.

Amstrad Computer User stated the Amstrad CPC version is ″not an outstandingly good game, or an absolutely crummy one either″.

In 1996, Next Generation listed Hard Hat Mack at number 92 in their "Top 100 Games of All Time". They judged it the most successful attempt at a platform game for its time, due to the developers' effective execution of a number of elements that have since become mainstays of the platforming genre.
