= Kezar Stadium =

Outdoor athletic and football stadium in San Francisco

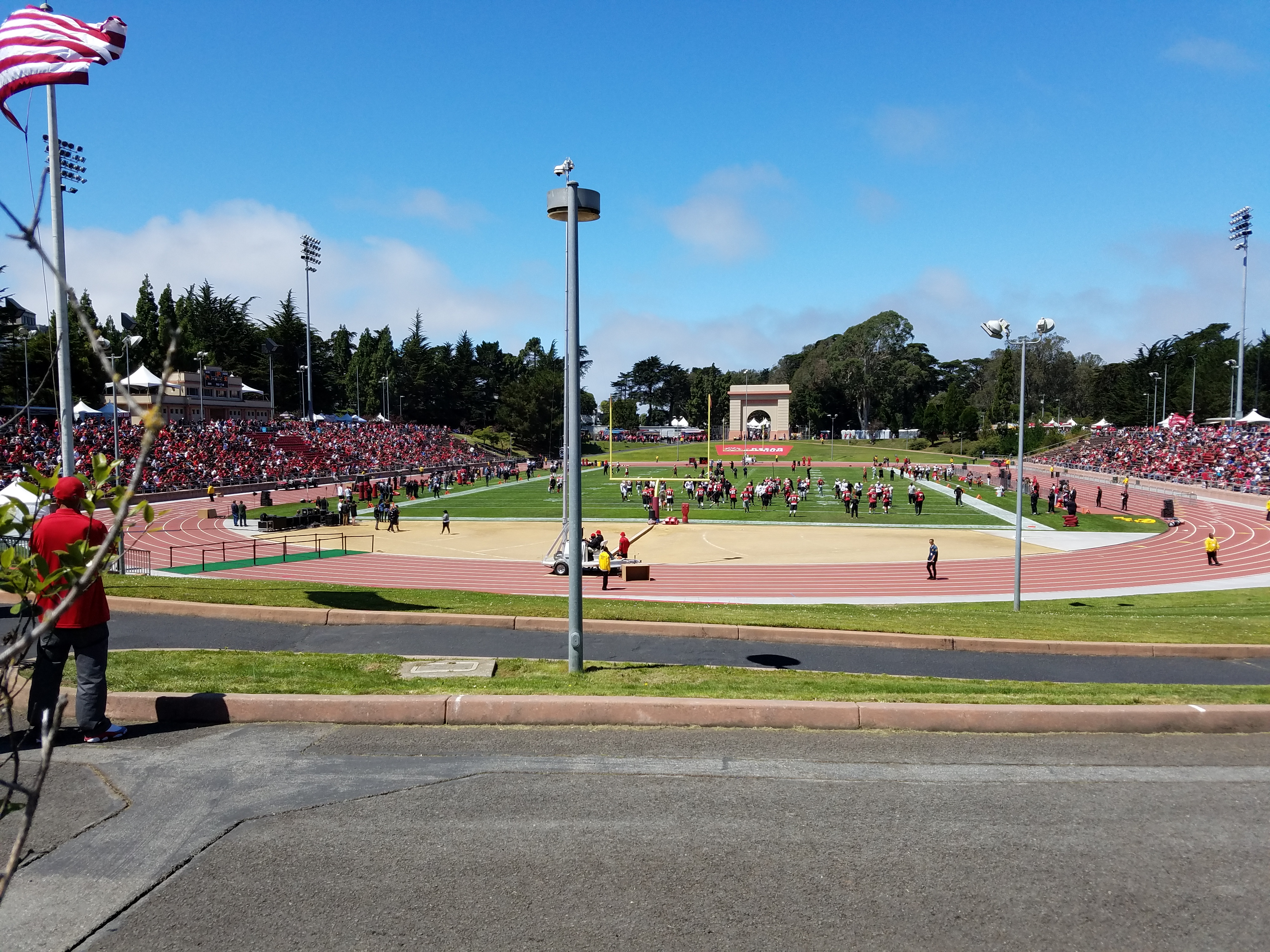

- Location within San Francisco
- Address: 670 Stanyan Street
- Location: San Francisco, California, United States
- Coordinates: 37.767°N 122.456°W
- Owner: City and County of San Francisco
- Operator: San Francisco Recreation & Parks Department
- Capacity: 59,942 (1925–1989); 10,000 (1990–present)
- Surface: Natural grass
- Public transit: Carl and Stanyan

Construction
- Groundbreaking: June 27, 1924
- Opened: May 2, 1925; 101 years ago
- Renovated: 1989–1990 (reconstruction)
- Demolished: 1989 (original)
- Cost: $300,000 (original structure) ($5.51 million in 2025 dollars)
- Architect: Willis Polk

Tenants
- San Francisco Dons football (NCAA) (1930–1951, 1959–1971); Santa Clara Broncos football (1935–1952); Saint Mary's Gaels football (1927–1950); San Francisco 49ers (AAFC/NFL) (1946–1970); Oakland Raiders (AFL) (1960); San Francisco Golden Gate Gales (USA) (1967); San Francisco Bay Seals (A-League) (1998–1999); San Francisco Freedom (PC) (2004); San Francisco Dragons (MLL) (2006–2007); California Victory (USL-1) (2007); San Francisco Stompers FC (NPSL) (2012, 2014); San Francisco Dogfish (MLU) (2013); Bay Area Breeze (W-League) (2013); San Francisco Deltas (NASL) (2017); San Francisco City FC (USL2) (2001–2016, 2018–present)

Kezar Stadium (/ˈkiːzɑːr/) is an outdoor athletics stadium in San Francisco, California, United States, located adjacent to Kezar Pavilion in the southeastern corner of Golden Gate Park. It serves as the home of San Francisco City FC of USL League Two.

It is the original home of the San Francisco 49ers and the Oakland Raiders (first AFL season only) of the National Football League (NFL).

Kezar also hosts amateur and recreation sports leagues, as well as numerous San Francisco high school football games (including the city championship, known popularly as the "Turkey Bowl").

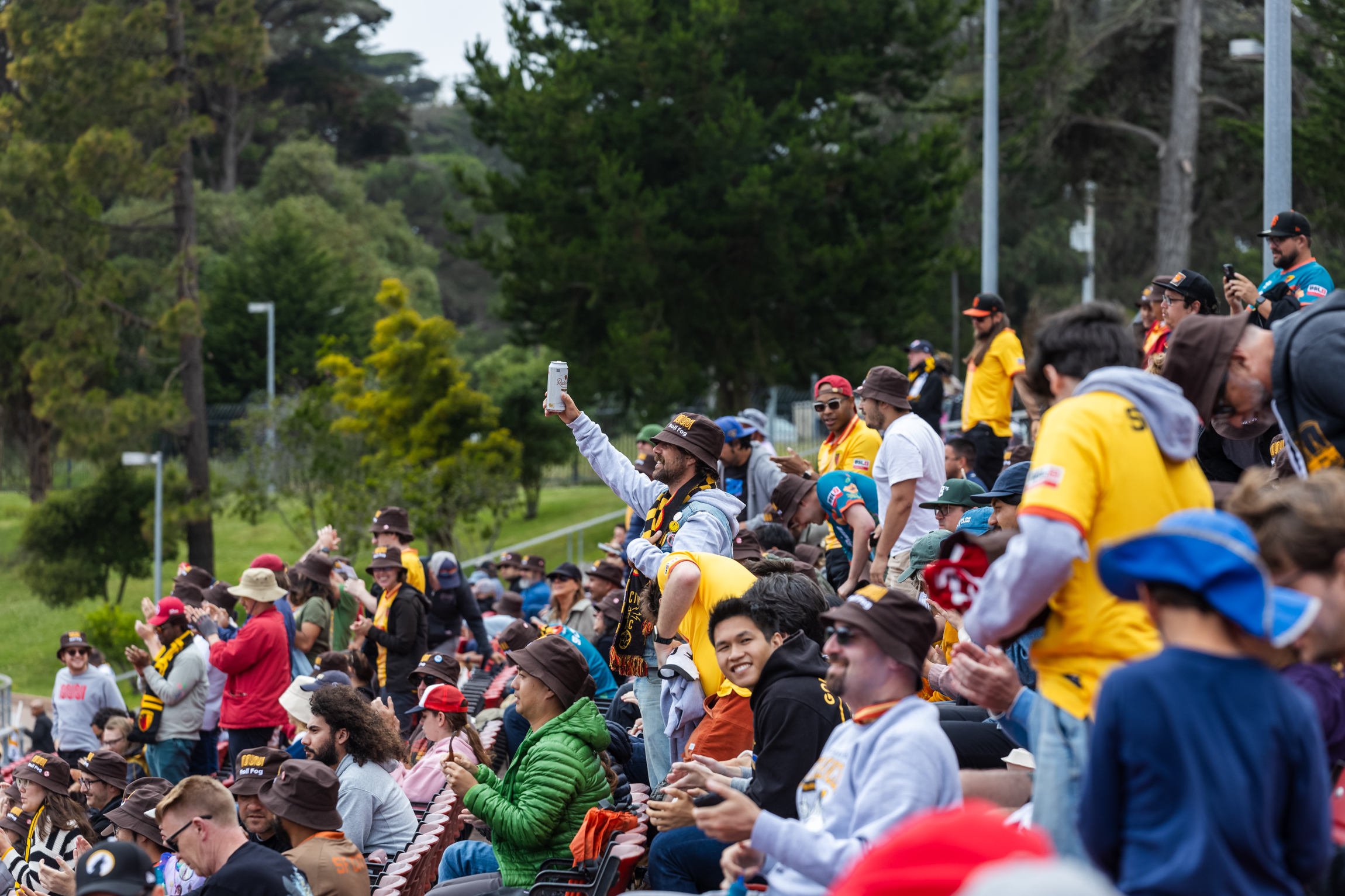
Crowd cheering on San Francisco City, 2024

== History ==
In 1920, Jack Spaulding proposed an athletics stadium for San Francisco, seating 50,000. Many business leaders in the city backed him, as it would keep San Francisco level with other cities with large stadiums. Areas under consideration for the stadium were 7th & Harrison Streets, Ocean Shore, and the Central Park grounds.

In 1922, the San Francisco Park Commission accepted a $100,000 gift from the estate of Mary Kezar to build a memorial in honor of her mother and uncles, who were pioneers in the area. After the City and County of San Francisco appropriated an additional $200,000, ground was broken on the stadium on June 27, 1924, and the stadium was built in a year. Dedication ceremonies were on May 2, 1925, and featured a two-mile (3.2 km) footrace between Ville Ritola and Paavo Nurmi of Finland, two of the great runners of the era. A little over a month later, the new stadium hosted the USA Outdoor Track and Field Championships.

The stadium had many uses in the 1930s. In addition to track and field competitions, Kezar Stadium hosted motorcycle racing, auto racing, rugby, lacrosse, soccer, baseball, boxing, cricket, and football. In September 1932, the Australian Cricket Team played a North California all-star team in the Australians' 56-game tour of the U.S. and Canada. The stadium was also home to several colleges (Santa Clara, USF, St. Mary's), Lowell High School, and the now-defunct San Francisco Polytechnic High School. In 1926, the stadium also became the home of the East–West Shrine Game.

=== American football ===
==== High school ====
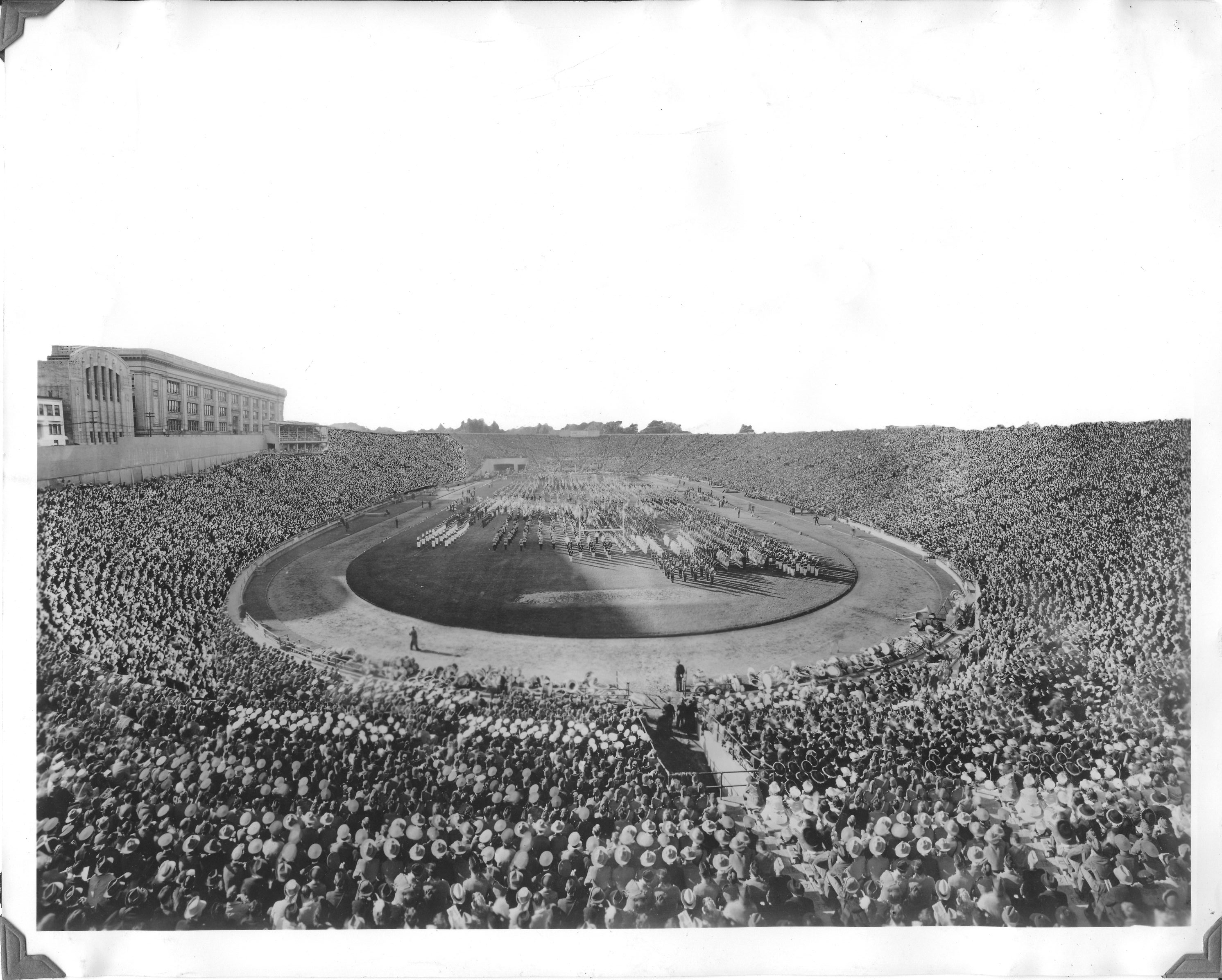
Original Kezar Stadium

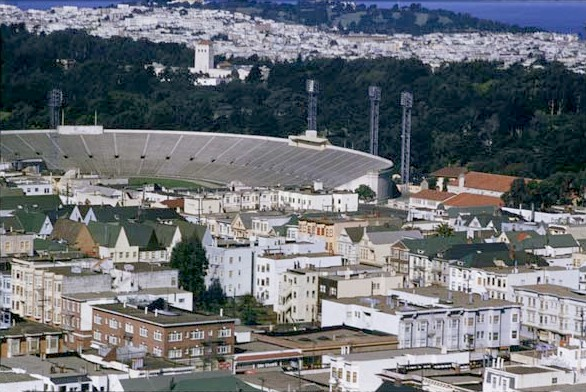
Kezar Stadium in 1955, from Mount Olympus

In 1928, the city high school championship game between cross-town rivals San Francisco Polytechnic and Lowell drew more than 50,000—still the record for a high school football game in northern California. Local Sacred Heart Cathedral Preparatory plays most of their home games at Kezar. The annual Bruce-Mahoney rivalry football game between St. Ignatius College Preparatory and Sacred Heart Cathedral Preparatory is held at the new (smaller) stadium.

==== College ====
The annual East-West Shrine Game of 1931 was replaced by a raucous Knights of Columbus game featuring the Savoldi All-Stars. Prescott Sullivan, a San Francisco News Call Bulletin sportswriter, recounted the day's events in his January 26 column. "Jumping Joe" Savoldi gave some very sound reasons why Knute Rockne calls him "modern football's greatest fullback" yesterday when he led a team composed largely of California and U.S.C. stars to a 13–0 victory over Ernie Nevers and a supporting cast of St. Mary's players at Kezar Stadium. More than 30,000 customers put the Knights of Columbus' grid finales over in a big way and saw "Jumping Joe" and his playmates cinch their victory with two spectacular fourth period touchdowns. These runs, end to end, constituted a very sizable day's work for "Jumping Joe", and the crowd showed it's [sic] deep appreciation by mobbing him at the finish of the ball game. Savoldi managed to escape by throwing his headgear to the milling throng, and long after the players had left the field of action, Joe's helmet was still at the center of a battle royal. More than 200 enthusiastic souvenir hunters joined in the fight, which continued to rage unabated outside the stadium after police had managed to chase the combatants from the big bowl. Numerous black eyes were exchanged before mounted police finally quelled the uprising. Such is Savoldi's fame!"

Stanford University played four of its home football games at Kezar: one in 1928 and three in 1942. Stanford was also part of the first-ever major college football double header in 1940, which featured Stanford–San Francisco and Santa Clara–Utah.

==== Professional ====
Kezar Stadium was the first home of the San Francisco 49ers and Oakland Raiders, as well as many NFL Hall of Famers, historical NFL games, and the first "alley-oop". The Raiders played at Kezar for their first four home games in 1960, and at Candlestick Park during the remainder of their first two seasons, before Frank Youell Field was built as a temporary facility in Oakland. Defensive end Jim Marshall of the visiting Minnesota Vikings had his famous "wrong way run" at Kezar in 1964, against the 49ers on October 25.

Kezar had a poor reputation among NFL players. In his 1987 memoir, Hall of Fame defensive tackle Art Donovan recalls the "look of dread" worn by visiting teams arriving at the stadium, owing to its inadequate dressing rooms, long, dusty tunnel to the field, shredded turf that was a byproduct of rain and overuse, and "god damned seagulls" that would arrive in the fourth quarter and "start shitting on you like they were aiming." Fans were also notoriously rowdy at the stadium and often got into brawls. After the 1970 NFC Championship Game, the final NFL game at Kezar, 22 people were arrested for fighting each other in the stands or throwing cans and bottles of alcohol into the air.

The 49ers lost the 1970 NFC title game to the Dallas Cowboys 17–10 on January 3, 1971. They moved to the more modern and accessible Candlestick Park (1960–2015) for the 1971 season, and played there through 2013. In 2003 and 2016, the 49ers hosted open practices at Kezar.

Kezar Stadium was also the home field of the San Francisco Stingrayz women's professional football team from 2003–2005, until the team was forced to end their season due to a bus accident that injured many players. The Stingrayz were one of the Bay Area's women's tackle football teams in the Women's Professional Football League, and then the Independent Women's Football League.

=== 1970s and 1980s ===
==== Dirty Harry ====
Months after the 49ers' departure, several scenes from the 1971 film Dirty Harry were filmed at and above the stadium. The film's fictional antagonist, Scorpio (played by Andrew Robinson), worked as the caretaker at the stadium and lived under the grandstand.

==== Concerts ====
With the loss of professional football in 1971, the stadium became a popular outdoor concert venue, and its proximity to the Haight-Ashbury District helped with the transition. Notable music events included the SNACK Benefit Concert in 1975. Among performers from that event and others were The Doobie Brothers, Jefferson Starship, Tower of Power, Joan Baez, Grateful Dead, Santana, Bob Dylan, Neil Young, Graham Central Station and Led Zeppelin.

=== Demolition and reconstruction ===
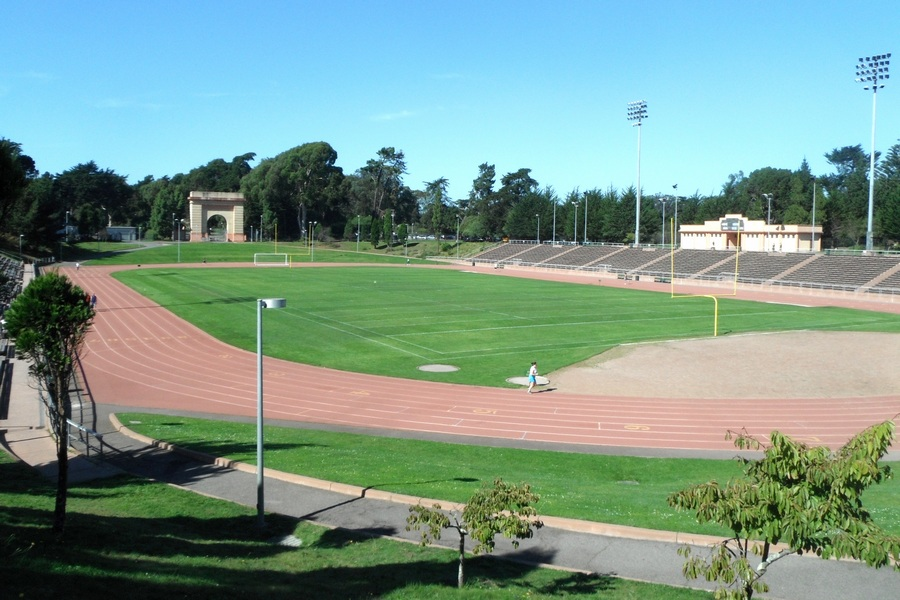
Kezar Stadium in October 2011

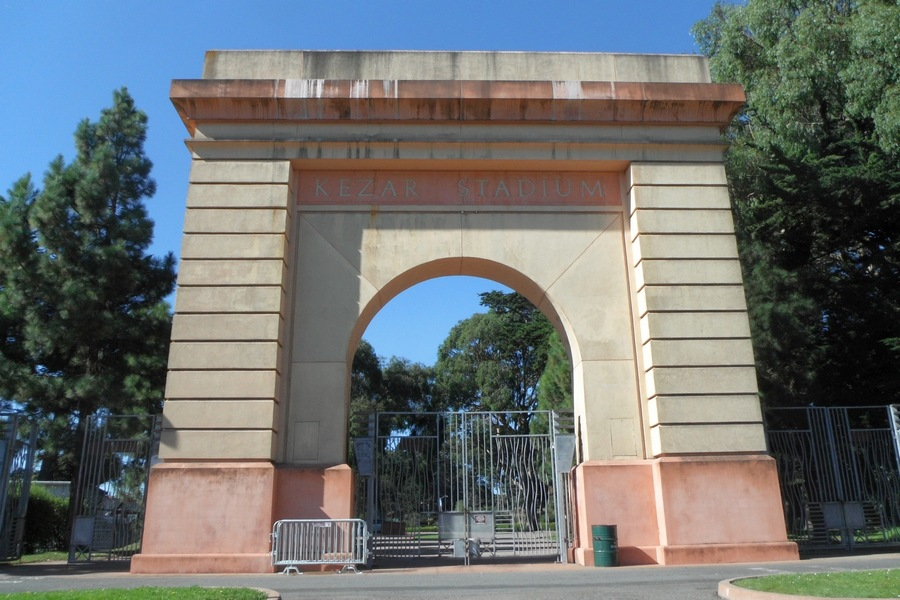
The replica arch at Kezar Stadium

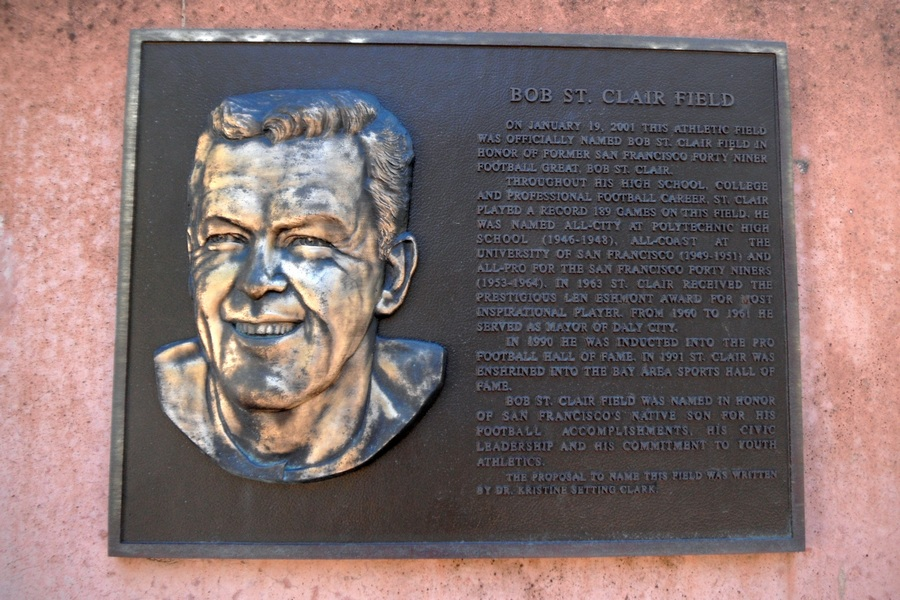
Plaque of NFL Hall of Famer Bob St. Clair at Kezar Stadium

With pending demolition, the bleacher planks of Kezar Stadium were sold off to fans at a party in April 1989. In June, the stadium was demolished and rebuilt with a much smaller seating capacity of 10,000. The upgrades included an eight-lane, all-weather track and a grass athletic infield suitable for soccer, football, and lacrosse.

During the reconstruction, the field and track configurations were shifted several degrees counterclockwise, to move the stadium away from Frederick Street. The evidence for this can be seen by examining photos of the tunnel entrance at the east end of the field, which used to be exactly on the long axis of the track. A replica of the original concrete arch bearing the name "Kezar Stadium" was built on the west side of the stadium as a tribute to the original structure. A plaque of NFL Hall of Famer Bob St. Clair, a San Francisco native who played 11 pro seasons (1953–63) with the 49ers, plus his high school (S.F. Poly) and most of his college career (USF) at Kezar Stadium, is built into the replica arch.

=== 2014–2015 renovation ===
Kezar Stadium was closed for renovations from September 2014 until March 2015. The $3.2-million renovation included new entry walk paving, upgraded sound system, new perimeter walkways and curbs, installation of new Mondo running track surface, and striping for nine 42” lanes. In addition, 1,000 historic Candlestick Park seats were installed for the public to enjoy. The renovation was funded by the city's Capital Planning General Fund. Mayor Edwin M. Lee helped re-open the stadium with a warm-up run.

In December 2016, 4,000 additional historic Candlestick seats were acquired and installed at Kezar. The seats were paid for by the San Francisco Deltas as a part of a $1-million improvement the team agreed upon to make use of the stadium.

== Soccer and other sports ==
In 1967 it served as the home stadium for the San Francisco Golden Gate Gales of the United Soccer Association.

With the 2006 West Coast expansion of Major League Lacrosse, Kezar Stadium once again became a home to a professional team, the San Francisco Dragons. In October 2006, United Soccer Leagues (USL) and Spanish football club Deportivo Alavés announced that the new pro soccer team, named California Victory, would play their 2007 home games at Kezar. The Victory played in the USL's First Division, one level below Major League Soccer. However, Alaves later withdrew their support and the team folded.

Sacred Heart Cathedral Preparatory, a nearby Catholic high school uses the field for their home football games. Mission High School also uses the field for home games. Kezar has also been the host of several Northern California Semi-pro football championship games.

In 2010, 2011, and 2012, Stanford University held its spring football game at Kezar. For the 2012 and 2016 San Francisco Olympic bids, Kezar was designated to host field hockey had San Francisco been chosen in either year.

From 2001 to present, Kezar has been the home field for San Francisco City FC, a supporter-owned club playing in USL Two.

In 2017, Kezar became the home field for the San Francisco Deltas, a professional soccer team playing in the North American Soccer League (NASL). The Deltas have contributed over $1-million in renovations to the stadium. However, Deltas announced that they would be concluding operations and the team folded.

In February 2018, San Francisco City FC announced they would return to Kezar Stadium for the 2018 PDL season.

=== Women's soccer ===
The San Francisco Nighthawks, founded in 1995 and a member of the Women's Premier Soccer League, play their home games at Kezar. The Bay Area Breeze of the W-League started play there in 2013.

=== College lacrosse ===
Kezar is also the home to the annual San Francisco Fall Lacrosse Classic, an NCAA Division I fall ball game started in 2009 to benefit the Bay Area Youth Sports Foundation. The first event was between Brown and North Carolina. It was the first Division I men's lacrosse played in Northern California. North Carolina beat Brown 13–5 in front of a crowd of more than 4,500. The 2010 event featured lacrosse powerhouse Johns Hopkins and Notre Dame on Saturday, October 16, 2010. Notre Dame beat Hopkins 10–7. The third installment took place on Saturday, October 8, 2011, and featured the University of Denver and Harvard University. The fourth installment took place Sunday October 21, 2012 in a match between Lehigh and Ohio State. As a direct result of the San Francisco Fall Lacrosse Classic, the BAYS Foundation has made over $225,000 in grants to local youth sports and educations programs for under-resourced children throughout the Bay Area.

=== Other sports ===
In 2006 and 2007, Kezar hosted the San Francisco Dragons of Major League Lacrosse.

In 2013, Kezar was home to the Major League Ultimate (MLU) team, the San Francisco Dogfish.

Kezar was home to the San Francisco GAA football league (Gaelic football). In 2004 it served as the home of the San Francisco Freedom, the city's Pro Cricket team.

Preceded by first stadium	Home of the San Francisco 49ers 1946–1970	Succeeded by Candlestick Park
Preceded by first stadium	Home of the Oakland Raiders; 1960	Succeeded by Candlestick Park
Preceded by first stadium	Host of NFC Championship Game; 1971	Succeeded by Texas Stadium
