= Altered Destiny =

1990 video game

- Developer: Accolade
- Publisher: Accolade
- Designer: Michael Berlyn
- Platforms: MS-DOS, Amiga
- Release: October 1990
- Genre: Graphic adventure
- Mode: Single-player

Altered Destiny is a graphic adventure game released by Accolade in 1990 for MS-DOS compatible operating systems and in 1991 for Amiga. The game was designed by Michael Berlyn and it uses a text parser interface. It is the second adventure game from Accolade and it uses the same engine as the first one, Les Manley in: Search for the King.

== Plot ==
The player assumes the role of a normal middle-class man named P.J. Barrett. After a mixup in the local repair shop, he accidentally brings home a TV set that belongs to a barbarian warrior. When he switches on the TV he is unexpectedly sucked through the screen into the planet Daltere where he finds out that an alien named Helmar has stolen "the jewel of light" and that this world is in danger. Thus he is forced to take on a mission to free it from tyranny and to save the galaxy.

== Reception ==
Scorpia of Computer Gaming World wrote that Altered Destiny "leaves me with mixed feelings". She stated that the graphics were merely "okay" and the pathing was "ridiculous and frustrating", but concluded that it was "still a game worth playing" because of its difficulty level, "bizarre and alien" setting, "tough but fair" puzzles, and humor. Allgame described the game as similar to King's Quest and Space Quest but without the charm.
