= Suspended (video game) =

1983 video game

Suspended: A Cryogenic Nightmare
- Developer: Infocom
- Publisher: Infocom
- Designer: Michael Berlyn
- Engine: ZIL
- Platforms: Amiga, Amstrad CPC, Apple II, Atari 8-bit, Atari ST, Commodore 64, Plus/4, IBM PC, Mac, TI-99/4A, TRS-80
- Release: Release 5: February 22, 1983 Release 7: April 19, 1983; Release 8: May 21, 1983 Release 8: May 21, 1984
- Genres: Adventure, interactive fiction
- Mode: Single-player

Suspended: A Cryogenic Nightmare is an interactive fiction video game written by Michael Berlyn and published by Infocom in 1983. Infocom's sixth game, it was released for Amstrad CPC, Apple II, Atari 8-bit computers, Commodore 64, Plus/4, IBM PC compatibles (as a self-booting disk), TRS-80, and TI-99/4A. It was later available for Mac, Amiga, and Atari ST.

== Plot ==
The player's character has been embedded within a facility that controls vital systems, such as moving public transportation belts and weather control, for an Earth-settled planet called Contra. During the player's five-hundred-year tenure, the player would normally be kept in stasis while his sleeping mind serves as the Central Mentality for the largely self-maintaining systems. As the game opens, however, he is awakened by severe error messages; something is going wrong. The facility has suffered catastrophic damage from an earthquake, and the Filtering Computers are shutting down or becoming dangerously unstable. The inhabitants of the city assume that the Central Mentality has gone insane and is purposely harming the city, as a previous CM had done. The player's task is to repair the damage and restore the systems to normal states before a crew arrives at the facility to "disconnect" his mind, killing him, to be replaced with a clone.

== Gameplay ==
Start of the game (C64)

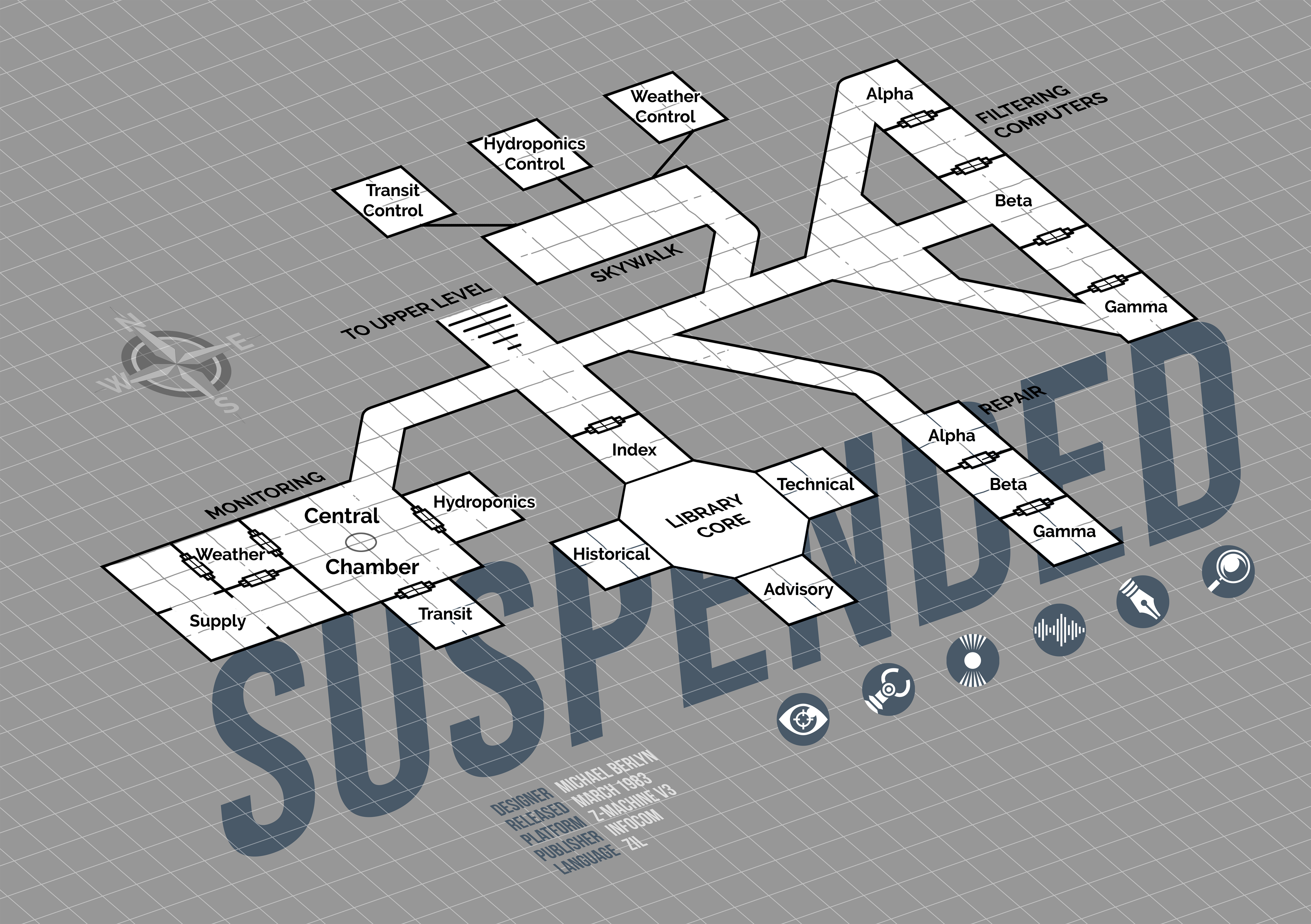
Game world (excerpt)

Rather than being free to move about and interact with the game world directly, the player's character spends the entire game in a state of suspended animation (hence the title) and can only interact by controlling the actions of a number of robot surrogates. Each robot has its own unique strengths and weaknesses, and describes the same rooms and objects in completely different terms based upon those specializations. The robots are:

1. Iris - The only robot with visual sensors, Iris can provide visual descriptions of locations and objects. As the game begins, however, Iris has suffered a burnt-out microchip and cannot see. Iris is confined to the area surrounding the Central Chamber.
2. Whiz - The most technical robot, Whiz is used mainly for interfacing with a central library computer for historical and technical information.
3. Waldo - The most capable physical manipulator, with several limbs for grasping and holding objects, Waldo perceives the world using sonar. (The term "Waldo" was originally coined by Robert A. Heinlein to describe teleoperated robots.)
4. Auda - Auda is equipped with sensitive audio receptors and can provide information on sounds and vibrations.
5. Poet - A diagnostic robot, Poet can sense the flow of electricity; he tends to communicate in somewhat cryptic language.
6. Sensa - Sensa is specialized for the detection of magnetic and photon emissions.

So, for example, Auda will describe a room primarily in terms of the sounds being generated there, Poet will describe it in terms of diagnostics of the equipment there (and phrase it in amusingly metaphorical language), and Iris will provide a visual description. All six of the robots can be given orders in conjunction, and some of the challenges the player faces require that several of the robots work together to solve them.

There is a seventh robot, an all-purpose multifunction repair robot named Fred, who spends the entirety of the game broken and cannot be repaired.

Suspended has six ways to die.

== Release ==
The cover of the original release was a three-dimensional moulded plastic mask, with cut-outs that revealed eyes printed on the game's manual. Reissues of the game had a more conventional cover. Each package included the following physical items:

1. A map of the facility and small tokens representing each robot. These were intended to allow the player to more easily keep track of each character's whereabouts in the somewhat confusing layout of the facility. Unlike most other text adventure games, the room descriptions of Suspended do not mention the directions of possible exits, which makes the map vital to playing.
2. Briefing for the Contra Central Mentality, a booklet that provides an overview of the facility, the robots, the computer system, and the player character's responsibilities
3. A letter from the Contra Central Lottery Commission Headquarters explaining that the player has been chosen to serve as Central Mentality for the next 500 years
4. A Contra Central Mentality Lottery Card

== Reception ==
The game sold 99,956 copies.

Suspended was well received by critics. Softline praised the feelies as "continued breakthroughs in packaging and merchandising", and noted the game's replayability. The magazine concluded that "Suspended represents another milestone in the continuing evolution of the interactive computer novel." Computer Gaming World considered each robot to have a unique personality, and praised the use of the library computer as an in-game hint system. The game's parser and time-saving techniques (such as a "follow" command) were similarly praised. Brian Moriarty of ANALOG Computing also praised the robots' characterization, stating that "a few hours with these electronic personalities will make them your friends" and comparing the experience to that of "a fine novel". He concluded that Suspended and other Infocom products "are among the finest examples of a new and entertaining means of self-expression which can now be regarded as 'literature' without apology." Ahoy! wrote that Berlyn "has lavished a good deal of complexity and eccentricity into his game. I recommend it." Compute!'s Gazette called Suspended "an exciting, imaginative adventure game that's likely to keep you glued to your keyboard for hours." Although it also noted how the "response time can be somewhat slow" and "some commands require as long as two or more minutes for a response." But the Compute! review concluded: "If the small inconvenience of a sometimes slow response does not bother you, then I can highly recommend Suspended." Hi-Res wrote that Suspended "is an excellent game" and "a worthy successor to the Zork series."

The game received a Certificate of Merit in the category of "1984 Best Science Fiction/Fantasy Computer Game" at the 5th annual Arkie Awards.

Bill Wallace reviewed Suspended in Space Gamer No. 68. Wallace commented that "If you do like text adventures - difficult ones - then this game is a must."

In 1996, Computer Gaming World declared Suspended the 58th-best computer game ever released.
