= Cosmic Crusader =

1982 video game

- Developer: Michael Abrash
- Publisher: Funtastic
- Platform: IBM PC
- Release: 1982
- Genre: Fixed shooter
- Mode: Single-player

Cosmic Crusader is a fixed shooter video game for IBM PC compatibles programmed by Michael Abrash and published in 1982 by Funtastic as a self-booting disk.
