= Snack Attack II =

1982 video game

- Developers: Dan Illowsky; Michael Abrash
- Publisher: Funtastic
- Platform: IBM PC
- Release: 1982
- Genre: Action

Snack Attack II is a Pac-Man-inspired maze video game released as a self-booting disk for IBM PC compatibles. It was written by Dan Illowsky and Michael Abrash and published by Funtastic in 1982. The game is a sequel to the Apple II game Snack Attack published by Datamost.

== Reception ==
Richard Cook for PC World said "Snack Attack II is a simple but polished program; no problems interfere with serious gumdrop gobbling. This game's improvements over Pac Man – the speedup of the mouth after it gobbles an apple, the safety boxes, the skill levels, and the different mazes – give it an edge over its famous predecessor."

Will Fastie for Creative Computing said "as far as I'm concerned, it's the best arcade-style game currently available for the IBM PC. The game is Snack Attack II. It's a Pac-Man clone. It's addictive and tough. It's well-built. It's fun."

Corey Sandler for PC Magazine said "Snack Attack II looks like, sounds like, plays like – and if you really want to anthropomorphize its hero – tastes like old friend Pac-Man. Only it's been subtly improved."
