= Michael Berlyn =

American video game designer (1949–2023)

- Berlyn circa 1980s
- Born: 1949
- Died: March 2023 (aged 73)
- Occupation: Game designer
- Employer(s): Infocom, Accolade
- Known for: Co-founder of Bend Studio
- Notable work: Suspended; Bubsy in Claws Encounters of the Furred Kind; Bubsy 3D
- Spouse: Muffy Berlyn

Michael Berlyn (1949 – March 2023) was an American video game designer and writer. He was best known as an implementer at Infocom, part of the text adventure game design team. He is also known as the designer behind Bubsy and the games Bubsy in Claws Encounters of the Furred Kind (1993) and Bubsy 3D (1996).

== Life and career ==
Brainwave Creations was a small game programming company started by Michael Berlyn. The company was founded in the mid-1980s, and is probably best known for co-creating Tass Times in Tonetown along with Interplay's Rebecca Heineman.

Berlyn joined Marc Blank in founding the game company Eidetic, which later became Bend Studio. In the midst of working on the company's second game, Syphon Filter, Berlyn left the video game industry. He later explained, "I did not like what the game business had become, the people who were driving it, or the nature of the product. I left before it was done and said, 'Do not put my name on the product.' I walked away from my own company. When you tell me you want to put a monk or a nun in my game and have them standing there holding guns so I can justify having the players shoot them, I think that crosses the boundaries of good taste. It doesn't offend ME, but it's got to be in bad taste, and you have to know that."

In 1998, Berlyn started Cascade Mountain Publishing, whose goals were to publish ebooks and interactive fiction. Cascade Mountain Publishing went out of business in 2000. After this business venture collapsed, Berlyn returned to the video game industry, with a focus on casual games.

Berlyn created a "light-jazz" band called Hot Mustard, made up entirely of his own music and performances.

Berlyn was diagnosed with cancer in September 2014, after which he underwent chemotherapy and radiation treatment until at least mid-2015. He died in March 2023, at the age of 73.

== Games ==
- Oo-Topos, 1981, Sentient Software and Polarware/Penguin Software
- Cyborg, 1981, Sentient Software
- Gold Rush, 1982, Sentient Software
- Congo, 1982, Sentient Software
- Suspended, 1983, Infocom
- Infidel, 1983, Infocom
- Cutthroats, 1984, Infocom
- Fooblitzky, 1985, co-designer, Infocom
- Tass Times in Tonetown, 1986, Activision
- Dr. Dumont's Wild P.A.R.T.I., 1988, First Row Software Publishing
- Keef the Thief, 1989, Electronic Arts
- Altered Destiny, 1990, Accolade
- Les Manley in: Search for the King, 1990, Accolade
- Snoopy's Game Club, 1992, Accolade (with former Intellivision programmer Gene Smith)
- Columbo’s Mystery Capers, 1993, Bend Studio
- Dell Crossword Puzzles, 1993, Bend Studio
- Motile, 1993, Bend Studio
- Notion (List Maker), 1993, Bend Studio
- Bubsy in Claws Encounters of the Furred Kind, 1993, Accolade
- Bubsy 3D, 1996, Accolade
- Zork: The Undiscovered Underground, 1997, Activision (with Marc Blank)
- Dr. Dumont's Wild P.A.R.T.I., 1999, Cascade Mountain Publishing
- Syphon Filter, 1999, contributor, producer, 989 Studios
- Zen Ball, Quick Click Software
- The Art of Murder (with Muffy Berlyn), iOS, Windows, OS X, Flexible Tales
- Grok the Monkey (aka Carnival of Death) (with Muffy Berlyn), iOS, Windows, Flexible Tales
- A Taste for Murder (with Muffy Berlyn), iOS, Windows, Flexible Tales
- Reconstructing Remy (an interactive novel with Muffy Berlyn), iOS, Windows, Flexible Tales
- Ogg!, iOS, OS X, Flexible Tales

== Novels ==
- The Integrated Man, Bantam Books (1980), ISBN 978-0-5531-3999-0
- Crystal Phoenix, Bantam Books (1980), ISBN 978-0-5531-3468-1
- Blight as Mark Sonders, Ace Books (1981), ISBN 978-0-4410-6709-1
- Eternal Enemy, Wm. Morrow (1990), ISBN 978-0-8779-5963-2
