= Infidel (video game) =

1983 video game

- Developer: Infocom
- Publisher: Infocom
- Designers: Michael Berlyn; Patricia Fogleman
- Engine: Z-machine
- Platforms: Amiga, Amstrad CPC, Apple II, Atari 8-bit, Commodore 64, IBM PC, TRS-80, TI-99/4A, Macintosh, Amiga, Atari ST
- Release: November 1, 1983
- Genre: Interactive fiction
- Mode: Single-player

Infidel is an interactive fiction video game published by Infocom in 1983. It was written and designed by Michael Berlyn and Patricia Fogleman, and was the first in the "Tales of Adventure" line. It was released for the Amstrad CPC, Apple II, Atari 8-bit computers, Commodore 64, IBM PC compatibles (as a self-booting disk), TRS-80, and TI-99/4A. Ports were later published for Mac, Atari ST, and Amiga. Infidel is Infocom's tenth game.

== Plot ==
Infocom intended Infidel to be the first of a "Tales of Adventure" series.

The player's character is a self-styled adventurer and fortune hunter. The character appears to have a bitter personality as he thinks that his boss Craige should treat him as a partner instead of an assistant. Progressing in the storyline a call comes while Craige is out checking some equipment. The call is from a woman named Rose Ellington, who wants to sponsor an expedition to discover the pyramid that her archaeologist father was not able to. The player's character egoistically and hungry for attention tells the woman he is more than capable of taking the job and decides not to inform Craige about the call.

In 1916, Dr. Ellington came into possession of a 5000-year-old fragment of pottery covered with hieroglyphics. After years of research, Dr. Ellington managed to decipher a portion of the text, indicating the general location of a pyramid that was not known of. The deciphered text described a queen with great riches. Later, when Howard Carter discovered the tomb of King Tut, Rose Ellington, the daughter of the now-late Dr. Ellington, thought that someone had found the pyramid and stowed the papers and artifacts away.

Rose found them in the early 1980s after her mother's death and did some preliminary fact-checking. She found out that the pyramid indicated by her father's findings was nowhere near the tomb of King Tut, and that the area Dr. Ellington was investigating had no discovered pyramids.

Rose, not being financially proficient, set the expedition to be a modest one. This was the perfect opportunity for an opportunistic soldier-of-fortune to make a name for himself. However, the “Navigation Box”, a crude forerunner of a Global Positioning System, was irreparably damaged. A new one was ordered, but the delivery was delayed and the resources and the will of the local diggers was dwindling. The adventurer, desperate to control the situation, commanded the workers to dig aimlessly and even browbeat them to work on a holy day.

As the game begins, the player awakens to realize that he has been drugged by his men, who have stolen most of the equipment and abandoned the camp. All the food and water is gone, and the player has no idea how to get back to civilization. He may very well have been left to die in the barren desert. But the navigation box finally arrives, convincing him that everything will work out as long as he can find the pyramid. Once he does, of course, there is the small matter of the traps the Egyptians set to protect their treasures from plunderers like him.

== Release ==
During Development, the game was initially called "Pyramid", though it was only through Infocom's ad agency that they asked for a new title, as "Pyramid" seemed rather uninspired. A Harvard University Egyptologist assisted in game design. One of the multiple endings was changed during playtesting because players thought that it rewarded an ethnic bias. There are 40 ways for the player to die.

Infidel's packaging includes the following physical items:

1. An "Expedition Log" kept by the player's character in the weeks prior to the game beginning
2. An envelope containing a letter written to Rose Ellingsworth by the player's character
3. A rubbing and partial translation of Dr. Ellington's limestone fragment from 1920
4. A roughly sketched map of the excavation area

== Reception ==
Softline called Infidel "diabolical... more death traps per square foot in the game than there are in Raiders of the Lost Ark". PC Magazine rated the game 12 points out of 12. It praised the sophisticated text parser, and described creator Michael Berlyn's prose as "exciting and fast-paced, with occasional bits of humor". InfoWorld's Essential Guide to Atari Computers recommended the game as among the best adventures for the Atari 8-bit. Scorpia, normally a fan of Infocom games, so disliked Infidel that she never mentioned it in Computer Gaming World. She denounced the game during an online discussion with Berlyn, however: "I did not like the premise of the story. I did not like the main character. I did not like the ending. I felt it was a poor choice to have a character like that in an Infocom game, since after all, regardless of the main character in the story, *I* am the only one who is really playing the game, really solving the puzzles".
