= Tass Times in Tonetown =

1986 video game

- Developers: Interplay; Brainwave Creations
- Publisher: Activision
- Designers: Michael Berlyn; Muffy McClung Berlyn
- Programmer: Rebecca Heineman
- Platforms: Atari ST, Amiga, Apple II, Apple IIGS, Commodore 64, IBM PC, Mac.
- Release: 1986
- Genre: Adventure
- Mode: Single-player

Tass Times in Tonetown is an adventure game published by Activision in 1986. It was designed by Michael Berlyn and Muffy McClung Berlyn and programmed by Rebecca Heineman of Interplay (credited as Bill Heineman) in cooperation with Brainwave Creations.

Tass Times was released for the Atari ST, Amiga, Commodore 64, Apple II, Apple IIGS, Mac, and IBM PC compatibles. It was the first commercial game for the IIGS.

== Plot ==
The plot of the game involves the player getting sucked into Tonetown, a surreal alternate world seemingly based on a distillation of 1980s culture, with overtones of punk and new wave culture (such as pink hair, etc.). The word "Tass" in the title refers to an adjective used within the parallel world of Tonetown. Its basic meaning is somewhat akin to "cool" or "hip". Game designer Michael Berlyn gives the following source for the word:

Muffy and I were employed there [at Harvard], teaching creative writing. And the motto of Harvard is 'Veritas,' which means 'truth.' We took to saying 'very tass' to mean, 'very true,' or 'too true.' Our students picked it up and started applying it to something that was cool. So very tass turned into very hip or cool.

The game's narrative begins with the player character inside a cabin belonging to "Gramps", a relative and inventor who has gone missing. While searching the cabin, the player activates one of Gramps' latest inventions: a device that resembles an electronically powered hoop. Gramps' pet dog, Spot, jumps through the active hoop and disappears. The player follows him and is transported to the mysterious Tonetown world alongside Spot, discovering that "Spot", in this world, is not only sentient and capable of speech but is actually a celebrity resident named "Ennio the Legend". Ennio travels along with the player, providing commentary and advice as well alerting the player to danger.

The player learns that Gramps' mysterious disappearance extends even into the Tonetown world, and may have been arranged by the villainous Franklin Snarl. Snarl, a surreal combination of a pig, a raccoon and (most obviously) a crocodile, is a ruthless business magnate. He is also a murderously hostile Tonetown nativist, openly violent to most "tourists" (foreigners) he encounters. His negative effects on the local culture had begun to attract media attention against him, culminating in the disappearance of Gramps.

To progress in the game, the player must assimilate into Tonetown's culture, using guitar picks as currency and partaking in its party scene, its "tass" music, including the popular band The Daglets, and such delicacies as "GloBurgers". The player encounters technology unique to Tonetown such as the "zagtone" (a device that plays variable notes depending on what object it is struck against), as well as bizarre creatures including the cute but destructive "blobpet" and dangerous monsters. The blobpet also makes an appearance in the animated intro exclusive to the Apple II, Commodore 64, and PC ports.

Gramps is eventually revealed to be Snarl's prisoner, held captive in an island office tower. After rescuing him, the player brings the group to a final confrontation with Snarl at his mansion, with Snarl possessing the Tonetown world's iteration of the hoop device. While Ennio holds Snarl at bay, Gramps activates the hoop and the player throws Snarl through it. The player enters the hoop and is returned to the "normal" world just outside Gramps' cabin, discovering that Snarl's arrival into the normal world has transformed him into three separate creatures - which the game's narrator describes as "a cute little pig, a darling raccoon, and a little crocodile shedding a few tears".

Talking to Snarl during the final sequence reveals that Gramps himself had created him, using the hoop device and the three original animal specimens, and that he had captured Gramps with the intention of continuing his work at any cost. It is also hinted that Tonetown itself may have been created entirely by Gramps' imagination, who then discovered a way to physically travel to it.

== Gameplay ==
Starting location (Apple IIGS)

The game is an example of the graphical text adventure genre. Somewhat like classical text adventures or the early Sierra games, players use text commands (e.g. "TAKE HOOPLET") to interact with the game, but like LucasArts adventure games (or the later Sierra games), they also use an intuitive GUI. The player viewed the world of the game through a small window at the top left of the screen in which their surroundings were displayed. Much like The Bard's Tale, this view was static (or mostly so); it was not animated, though it was context-sensitive (players could click on objects in this window rather than typing their names).

Like many text adventures of this era, Tass Times had its share of possible unwinnable situations in which players can discover themselves trapped. The most infamous of these is Gramps' lab book, which is found in his cabin at the start of the game, and is used to complete the game at almost its very end. Hapless players can leave the book behind only to realize it is needed for game completion right when they are on the verge of completing it. Other scenarios include many possible instances of saving the game in situations in which death can never be avoided in time, such as in a location too far away from the shopping boutiques, so that Snarl will kill a player still deemed a "tourist" before Tonetown apparel and hairstyles can ever be purchased.

== Ports ==
The port for IBM PC compatibles allows use of a computer mouse. At the time of release, PC mice were rare and the programmers had to code their own routines to read a serial mouse.

== Reception ==
Compute! stated that the Amiga version of Tass Times in Tonetown was a "fascinating new game" with "superb color graphics", calling the story "unusual". Hartley and Pattie Lesser similarly commented on the game in their "The Role of Computers" column in Dragon #116 (1986), stating "This one is truly bizarre". Computer Gaming World's Charles Ardai agreed, stating that the "strange story" did not interest him. The magazine's Roy Wagner stated that "This game is a relatively easy adventure with the added twist of the reality in which it is played. Get tass, stay tone-ly and find Gramps".

Macworld said that the Macintosh version of Tass Times in Tonetown was a "Challenging, unique game with [a] sense of humor". Praising its gameplay, puzzles, and atmosphere, the magazine said "What makes the game so challenging is also what makes it unique: the novelty of Tonetown, its mores, and its inhabitants. These same qualities make many clues difficult to decipher". Macworld noted that Tonetown lacked an 'operate' command, unlike Déjà Vu and Uninvited, instead requiring context-sensitive verbs for actions, i.e typing "unlock" to unlock a door. The magazine criticized Tonetown's difficulty and graphics, suggesting that a zoom feature would help with the latter.

Macworld inducted Tass Times in Tonetown into its 1987 Game Hall of Fame in the Adventure Game category, ahead of runners-up the Infocom text adventures released over the preceding year, in particular Bureaucracy and Stationfall. The magazine called Tass Times in Tonetown "something that seems a cross between Raw magazine, The Face, and the Bizarro World of DC Comics" and praised it as a fun game with a user-friendly interface.
