= Archon Ultra =

1994 video game

- Developer(s): Free Fall Associates
- Publisher(s): Strategic Simulations
- Designer(s): Jon Freeman; Paul Reiche III
- Platform(s): MS-DOS
- Release: 1994
- Genre(s): Turn-based strategy, action
- Mode(s): Single-player, multiplayer

Archon Ultra is an action-strategy video game developed by Free Fall Associates and published by Strategic Simulations in 1994 for MS-DOS. It is a remake of the 1983 game Archon: The Light and the Dark which was one of the first releases from Electronic Arts.

== Gameplay ==
A remake of Archon: The Light and the Dark, Archon Ultra adds updated graphics and sound. New gameplay features include secondary weapons that give all units two unique abilities, and the battle sequences are shown from a diagonal overhead point of view to simulate a third dimension in the battles. The game also has a multiplayer mode via modem.

== Reception ==
Computer Gaming World approved of how Ultra's new features made the game "worthwhile to players of the original" without "destroy[ing] the balance of the original", and noted the computer opponent's skill in the middlegame and endgame. The magazine concluded that the developers "brought the graphics and sound of Archon up to current standards, and have made minor changes to game play without sacrificing the elements that made the original a classic." PC Gamer (US) reviewed the game with a 76% Final Verdict, saying that the combination of strategy and arcade sequences give Archon Ultra great replay value. Archon Ultra was reviewed in 1994 in Dragon, receiving only 1 out of 5 stars.

James V. Trunzo reviewed Archon Ultra in White Wolf #45 (July, 1994), giving it a final evaluation of "Excellent" and stated that "If you love the strategy and tactics of chess and the excitement of using dragons, trolls, basilisk and banshees, you must rush out and buy Archon Ultra. It's an addictive product that challenges on many levels."

TJ Talasmaa was disappointed in a 79% review in Pelit (Issue 1/1994), writing that Free Fall Associates had forgotten "If it's not broken, don't fix it". Compared to the battle mode of the first game, Talasmaa wrote, the pieces moved sluggishly; the new battlefield made some pieces disproportionately powerful, with the introduction of damaging terrain letting "fliers calmly wait over a lava puddle, until a footman dies of boredom or runs into a stray shot;" the third dimension made landing hits inordinately difficult, taking away the tight "shoot-dodge-shoot" combat of the original; and the battlefield, which now zooms in and out similar to Star Control II, would've direly needed borders.
