= Big Top (video game) =

1983 video game

- Developer: Michael Abrash
- Publisher: Funtastic
- Platform: IBM PC
- Release: 1983
- Genre: Platform
- Mode: Single player

Big Top is a circus-themed platform game for IBM PC compatibles. It was programmed by Michael Abrash and published by Funtastic in 1983 as a self-booting disk.

== Gameplay ==
The first ring of the game

Big Top has a circus theme. Levels are called rings. Each ring spans at least two screens and has an upper and lower level. Obstacles include evil clowns, cannons, and rolling barrels.

== Reception ==
A review in PCMag was complementary, calling the game "a lovely piece of work, a beautifully designed, barrel-of-monkeys worth of fun."

== See also ==
- Sammy Lightfoot, another circus-themed platform game from 1983
