= SNACK Benefit Concert =

Concert held in San Francisco

SNACK, an acronym for Students Need Athletics, Culture and Kicks (a phrase thought up by columnist Herb Caen), was a benefit concert held in San Francisco on March 23, 1975. Playing to an audience of over 60,000 fans at Kezar Stadium, the concert, planned and produced by rock promoter Bill Graham, brought together the greatest array of rock artists at a single event since the Woodstock Festival in 1969. It was the largest rock benefit concert ever held at that time. The show included a one-time-only collaboration of Bob Dylan, The Band, and Neil Young as well as Santana, The Doobie Brothers, The Grateful Dead, and Jefferson Starship. Among the surprise guests were actor Marlon Brando and baseball star Willie Mays.

== Purpose ==
The Bay Area musicians were called to arms and they responded to the call. For me, it represented the use of the drawing power of our artists to address and attempt to solve a social problem.

— Bill Graham

Rock promoter Bill Graham put the show together to raise money for the San Francisco school district, which due to a shortage of funds, planned to eliminate after-school sports and other extra-curricular activities. Within two weeks after first reading the story in the newspaper, Graham acted quickly and personally called a few number of artists who agreed to perform for free: The Grateful Dead, Graham Central Station, Bob Dylan and members of The Band, Jefferson Starship, Tower of Power, the Doobie Brothers, Santana, Joan Baez, and Neil Young.

Graham explained to them that “The children will not have musical instruments. There will be no football practices. There will be no cheerleaders. No after-school tutoring.” He told the press, "We make our living from the youth of San Francisco. This is one way we hope to thank them."

He also felt that having some well-known sports and movie figures appear, who many considered heroes, would be well received. Marlon Brando told Graham he would be there as one of his unannounced guests. Baseball great Willie Mays, track and field medalist Jesse Owens, along with a number of other sports stars also agreed to be there.

The day before the concert, the school board announced that they had "found," as a result of accounting changes, $2.1 million, which eliminated much of the budget shortfall. Graham, despite being angry, decided to go ahead as planned and donate the funds to the schools. He said after the concert: "The Bay Area musicians were called to arms and they responded to the call. For me, it represented the use of the drawing power of our artists to address and attempt to solve a social problem."

== Performances ==
The stadium opened its gates at 6:00 AM. Among the first to enter were those from the seven to ten thousand people who had paid $5 for their tickets and had camped out all night on the stadium lawn or in Golden Gate Park. The show began at 9:00 AM, continuing non-stop for nine hours, ending at 6:00 PM. With the stadium at capacity, the police estimated that five- to ten thousand people had listened to the concert outside the stadium, either in the streets or from neighborhood rooftops. Most of the groups that played had their roots or lived in the San Francisco Bay Area.

The final set was performed by Neil Young, with two of his regular musicians, and Bob Dylan, who was a surprise guest, along with three members of The Band. They played some material by both Young and Dylan, a couple of cover songs, and a Band tune ("The Weight"), followed by Young's "Helpless", and a Dylan-improvised version of the classic "Knocking on Heaven's Door", which he changed to "Knockin" On The Dragon's Door."

== Guest appearances ==
The first unannounced guest was Reverend Cecil Williams of San Francisco's Glide Memorial Church, who took note of the brotherhood shown by the event. After various football stars, including Gene Washington, Cedric Hardman, Bob St. Clair and Frankie Albert made brief appearances, baseball star Willie Mays, who traveled from his home in Florida, spoke to the crowd after receiving a standing ovation. Washington said "Never, never did we witness this kind of enthusiasm for any event."

After a set by Jefferson Starship, Graham introduced another surprise star guest, Marlon Brando, who spoke to the crowd:

Nobody in history has witnessed an occasion like this. [Cheers] All these brothers up here — blacks, Chicanos, whites, Indians—people! [More cheers] All the brothers out there—that's you—make this possible. They make this spirit possible.

Graham recalled the audience's reaction when he introduced Brando: "I never heard before what I heard then. The mass was being told something that it was not prepared to hear. It was like they had all just seen a spaceship go by the window. It was like Zeus had just walked out on that stage. Royalty. True royalty, on the highest level. . . It was awesome."

== Performers ==
The list below is the actual running order of musical appearances, starting at 9:00 a.m.

- Eddie Palmieri
- Graham Central Station
- The Miracles (did not perform)
- Grateful Dead & friends
- Tower of Power
- Santana
- The Doobie Brothers
- Jefferson Starship
- Joan Baez
- Neil Young, backed by Tim Drummond, Long Grain, and members of The Band
- Bob Dylan, backed by Tim Drummond, Long Grain, and members of The Band

== Unannounced guests ==
- Reverend Cecil Williams
- John Brodie
- Rosie Casals
- Werner Erhard
- Cedric Hardman
- Willie Mays
- Jesse Owens
- Gene Washington
- Frankie Albert
- Marlon Brando
