= Free Fall Associates =

American video game developer

Free Fall Associates was a video game developer of the 1980s and early 1990s founded in 1981 in Palo Alto, California by game designer Jon Freeman, game programmer Anne Westfall, and game designer Paul Reiche III. Westfall and Freeman are married. To start the new company, Freeman and Westfall left Epyx, the company Freeman co-founded in 1978. Free Fall Associates is best known for Archon: The Light and the Dark (1983), which was one of the first games from new publisher Electronic Arts.

== Origin ==
Freeman, along with friend Jim Connelley, started Epyx as Automated Simulations as a vehicle to publish a game they had created together called Starfleet Orion for the Commodore PET home computer. They eventually published dozens of titles for numerous platforms, some very successful.

By 1981, however, Freeman had become frustrated with what he called "office politics" and decided to leave the company. His wife, Westfall, joined him, though she cites a desire to learn assembly language programming on the Atari 8-bit computers as a motivation. Reiche joined the duo as the company's third member.

Free Fall's first game was 1982's Tax Dodge, a maze chase for Atari 8-bit computers. According to Freeman, "Mainstream adults loved the idea, and we got written up in some major business magazines, but the market wasn't there yet".

== Association with Electronic Arts ==
Soon Freeman made a contact that would prove pivotal for both Free Fall and the fledgling computer game publisher, Electronic Arts (EA). The same day he incorporated his company, Trip Hawkins contacted Freeman. Freeman was attracted by EA's generous attitude and the welcome windfall of development cash. Soon, Free Fall signed EA's first two development contracts.

Their first game, Archon, was inspired by sword-and-sorcery themes and the holographic chess-like game in Star Wars. Originally intended for two players, EA requested a single-player mode. Freeman and Reiche designed the game and created the art while Westfall implemented it on an Atari 800 computer.

Archon was released in 1983 in the first batch of games from Electronic Arts. It was a hit, and EA asked for a sequel. Freeman and Westfall significantly altered the gameplay, strategies, and premise of the game, adding a new board, spells, creatures, and abilities. Archon II: Adept was released in 1984. Ports of both games were published by EA as two of the earliest games for the Amiga.

Freeman and Reiche, working with programmer Robert Leyland, developed a murder mystery game concurrently with Archon. Murder on the Zinderneuf generates a new plot each time it is played. Freeman says he was inspired by his favorite board game, Clue. It released a few weeks after Archon.

== Twilight ==
Freeman and Westfall went on to develop a few more games, such as Swords of Twilight (1989) for the Amiga and Archon Ultra (1994). Sometime during this period, Reiche left for other opportunities. None of these other games did nearly as well as Free Fall's first two seminal games.

Reiche paired up with programmer Fred Ford and the two developed the Star Control games, published by Accolade. Reiche and Ford eventually founded the video game developer Toys for Bob.

After the disappointment of their later titles, Free Fall went on to develop some online card games which were featured on Prodigy's GameTV service. These games included Simplex, Eureka, Reflection, Stop & Go, Grab and Heartless.

== Free Fall Games ==
By 2002, Freeman and Westfall had renamed their company Free Fall Games. Their only game to date, Triplicards, was released in or around 2002.
