= Midnight Snack =

Midnight Snack may refer to:

- A midnight snack, a small late night meal
- "Midnight Snack" (Robot Chicken), a 2005 episode of Robot Chicken
- Midnight Snack (album), a 2015 album by Homeshake
- The Midnight Snack, a 1941 Tom and Jerry cartoon
