= Anne Westfall =

American game programmer and software developer

- Occupation: Video game programmer
- Years active: 1984–present
- Known for: Archon: The Light and the Dark
- Spouse: Jon Freeman

Anne Westfall is an American video game programmer and software developer, known for 1983's Archon: The Light and the Dark, originally written for the Atari 8-bit computers. Westfall and her spouse, fellow game developer Jon Freeman, together founded Free Fall Associates.

== Career ==
Westfall began computer programming at the age of 30. Before moving into the video game industry, Westfall worked as a programmer for a civil engineering firm Morton Technology, where she developed the first microcomputer-based program designed to help lay out subdivisions.

In 1981, Westfall and her husband, Jon Freeman, left Epyx, the video game developer and publisher her husband co-founded just three years earlier. Westfall cited a desire to learn assembly language and to work on the Atari 800 as one reason for their departure from Epyx.

Together with game designer Paul Reiche III, they started Free Fall Associates to make computer games free of the politics existing at the now larger Epyx. Together with Jon and Reiche, she helped develop the two award-winning and highly acclaimed games Archon and Archon II, both games based on a combination of chess and arcade action. Both Jon and Reiche handled the brunt of the programming work. It took six months to develop this game, and many of the game details were held constant from the original idea.

For six years, Westfall was on the board of directors of the Computer Game Developers Conference.

Eventually, Westfall and her husband Jon renamed the company "Free Fall Games." For the last few years, though, Westfall has spent her time as a healthcare professional who converts voice recordings from healthcare providers into documents on medical records, also known as a medical transcriptionist.

== Personal ==
Before being with Jon Freeman, she was previously married, but then later got divorced. Westfall met Jon at the West Coast Computer Faire in 1980 while demonstrating her surveying program she wrote for the TRS-80. Her booth was next to that of Automated Simulations—later Epyx—where Jon was working. After dating for about six months, Freeman convinced Westfall to move closer and come to work at his company.

== See also ==
- List of women in the video game industry
- Women and video games
- Women in computing
