= Snacking =

Snacking may refer to:

- Eating a snack
- Grazing (human eating pattern), an eating pattern
