= Grazing (human eating pattern) =

Repetitive eating of small amounts of food

Grazing is a human eating pattern characterized as "the repetitive eating of small or modest amounts of food in an unplanned manner throughout a period of time, and not in response to hunger or satiety cues".

Two subtypes of grazing have been suggested: compulsive and non-compulsive. Compulsive grazing is accompanied by the feeling that the person is not able to resist going back to repetitively snack on the desired food. Non‐compulsive grazing is repetitively eating in a distracted and mindless way, without paying much attention to what is eaten.

== Background ==
The term "grazing" has been widely used by the general population in reference to a repetitive eating pattern. The scientific literature began to investigate this concept because of its extensive use and apparent association with weight gain. Several terms such as picking, nibbling, and snacking have been used indiscriminately in the literature to characterize grazing-type patterns of repetitive eating in humans. In 2014, Eva Conceição and colleagues proposed a consensual definition for grazing based on the opinion of various experts in the field.

Grazing seems to be related to loss of control over eating and can be conceptualized on the spectrum of disordered eating behaviors. It is considered as a risk behavior for adults undergoing weight loss treatment due to its associations with Body Mass Index and a great variability on weight-loss trajectories after bariatric surgery. It is thought to be present in up to 26.4% of bariatric patients pre‐operatively and in 46.6% after bariatric surgery. Specifically, compulsive grazing appears to be linked to eating disorder psychopathology.

== Repetitive eating questionnaire ==
The repetitive eating questionnaire (Rep(eat)-Q) is a 12-item self-report measure developed by Conceição, E. and colleagues to assess grazing eating patterns in adolescents and adults.

The Rep(eat)-Q is based on the consensual definition proposed by the authors and generates two subscales: 1) repetitive eating, and 2) compulsive grazing. Respondents rate the frequency of grazing eating behaviors in the previous month using a Likert scale ranging from 0 (never) to 6 (every day). Scores are calculated as the mean of the scale items and the total Rep(eat)-Q score can range from 0 to 6. The Rep(eat)-Q is worded in English, Portuguese (European and Brazilian), and Norwegian.
