= The Alpine Encounter =

1983 video game

VODAC: The Alpine Encounter
- Developer: Random House
- Publisher: Ibid-inc
- Platforms: Apple II, Commodore 64, IBM PC
- Release: WW: 1983
- Genre: Adventure game
- Mode: Single-player

VODAC: The Alpine Encounter is a 1983 adventure game for the Apple II published by Ibid-inc.

== Gameplay ==
The Alpine Encounter is an espionage game in which the player must stop an evil plot at an alpine ski resort. While primarily an adventure, it includes a skiing action game.

== Reception ==
James A. McPherson reviewed the program for Computer Gaming World, and stated that "An intermediate level game, The Alpine Encounter has detailed graphics similar to other current graphic adventure games."

Terry Rooker reviewed VODAC: The Alpine Encounter in Space Gamer No. 73. Rooker commented that "For people who like espionage adventures, VODAC can be fun and exciting. First you have to figure out the correct commands to be used; then you have to solve the mystery and save the world. If you are willing to accept this dual challenge, VODAC: The Alpine Encounter is the game for you."
