= Scooby Snacks (disambiguation) =

Scooby Snacks are a fictional dog treat in the Scooby Doo cartoons.

Scooby Snack(s) or Scoobie Snack(s) may also refer to:

- Scoobie Snack, a hamburger sold primarily at the Maggie snack bar in Glasgow, Scotland
- Scooby Snack (cocktail), a cocktail containing Midori
- "Scooby Snacks" (song), a song by Fun Lovin' Criminals from the 1996 album Come Find Yourself
- Scooby Snacks: The Collection, a 2003 compilation album by Fun Lovin' Criminals
