= Jon Freeman (game designer) =

Game designer and co-founder of Automated Simulations

Jon Freeman is a game designer and co-founder of software developer Automated Simulations, which was later renamed to Epyx and became a major company during the 8-bit era of home computing. He is married to game programmer Anne Westfall, and they work together as Free Fall Associates. Free Fall is best known for Archon: The Light and the Dark, one of the earliest titles from Electronic Arts.

== Career ==
=== Automated Simulations and Epyx ===
Freeman worked as a game designer for video game developer and publisher, Epyx, which he co-founded with Jim Connelley in 1978 as Automated Simulations.

Their first game, Starfleet Orion, was a two-player only game developed mainly so Connelley could write off the cost of his Commodore PET computer. Freeman provided design while Connelley handled the programming in BASIC. Freeman was amazed when they actually had a finished product and they had to create a company to publish it. So, both he and Connelley fell into the computer game industry by accident.

It was while with this company, still known as Automated Simulations in 1980, that Freeman met his future wife, Anne Westfall, at a computer fair.

Starfleet Orion was quickly followed by Invasion Orion. What followed was a slew of very successful titles for various platforms. Freeman designed or co-designed a number of Epyx games, such as Crush, Crumble and Chomp! and Rescue at Rigel. Freeman tired of what he called "office politics" and yearned to get away from the now much larger company.

=== The Complete Book of Wargames ===
In 1980, Freeman, in collaboration with the editors of Consumer Guide, wrote The Complete Book of Wargames, which was published by Simon & Schuster under their "Fireside" imprint. In the book, Freeman, explained the history of wargames to that point, the notable companies, the usual components, and evaluated most of the major wargames in print at the time, as well as the role that computer games would play in this field.

=== Free Fall Associates ===
In 1981, Freeman and Anne Westfall left Epyx to create Free Fall Associates along with game designer Paul Reiche III.

Free Falls' first game was 1982's Tax Dodge, which remained obscure. Free Fall went on to develop two highly acclaimed games published by Electronic Arts: Archon and Archon II: Adept. Originally written for the Atari 8-bit computers, they were ported to other contemporary home systems.

Free Fall developed a few more titles after Archon II, but nothing as well-known. Freeman is credited with some recent development work with Square Enix.
