= Snack Attack =

1982 video game

- Developer: Funtastic
- Publisher: Datamost
- Designer: Dan Illowsky
- Platform: Apple II
- Release: NA: October 1981
- Genre: Maze
- Mode: Single-player

Snack Attack is a maze video game developed by Dan Illowsky for the Apple II and published by Datamost in 1981. Snack Attack is a Pac-Man clone.

== Gameplay ==
The player controls the Snacker, a small, white, fish-like character, and moves through a maze to "eat" all the gumdrops scattered throughout. Gumdrop Guards, four enemies that patrol the maze, attempt to catch the Snacker. There are green and purple barriers that can only be crossed by the Snacker and the Guards, respectively.

The character can move in four directions, allowing the player to escape the Gumdrop Guards.

By eating one of several "magic stars" in the maze, the Snacker gains a set of sharp teeth and can briefly eat the guards for bonus points, sending them back to their home base to regenerate. Occasionally, a giant jack-o-lantern appears and can be eaten for bonus points. Once all the gumdrops have been cleared, the player begins the next maze at a faster speed. The game cycles through three different mazes.

== Reception ==
The game debuted in October 1981. It sold 25,000 copies by June 1982, tied for fourth on Computer Gaming World's list of top sellers. Snack Attack won an award in the category of "Best Solitaire Computer Game" at the 4th annual Arkie Awards, where judges praised its "multiple mazes, charming graphics and sound effects, and well-nigh-addictive play action". The game's color-coded doors were also described as "another big plus, adding an extra dollop of strategy". David H. Ahl of Creative Computing Video & Arcade Games said of Snack Attack and Jawbreaker, that "for Pac-Man [sic] fans, either is recommended.

== Legacy ==
The sequel, Snack Attack II, is an IBM PC compatible-only game co-authored with Michael Abrash and published by Funtastic.
