= Michael Abrash =

American programmer and technical writer

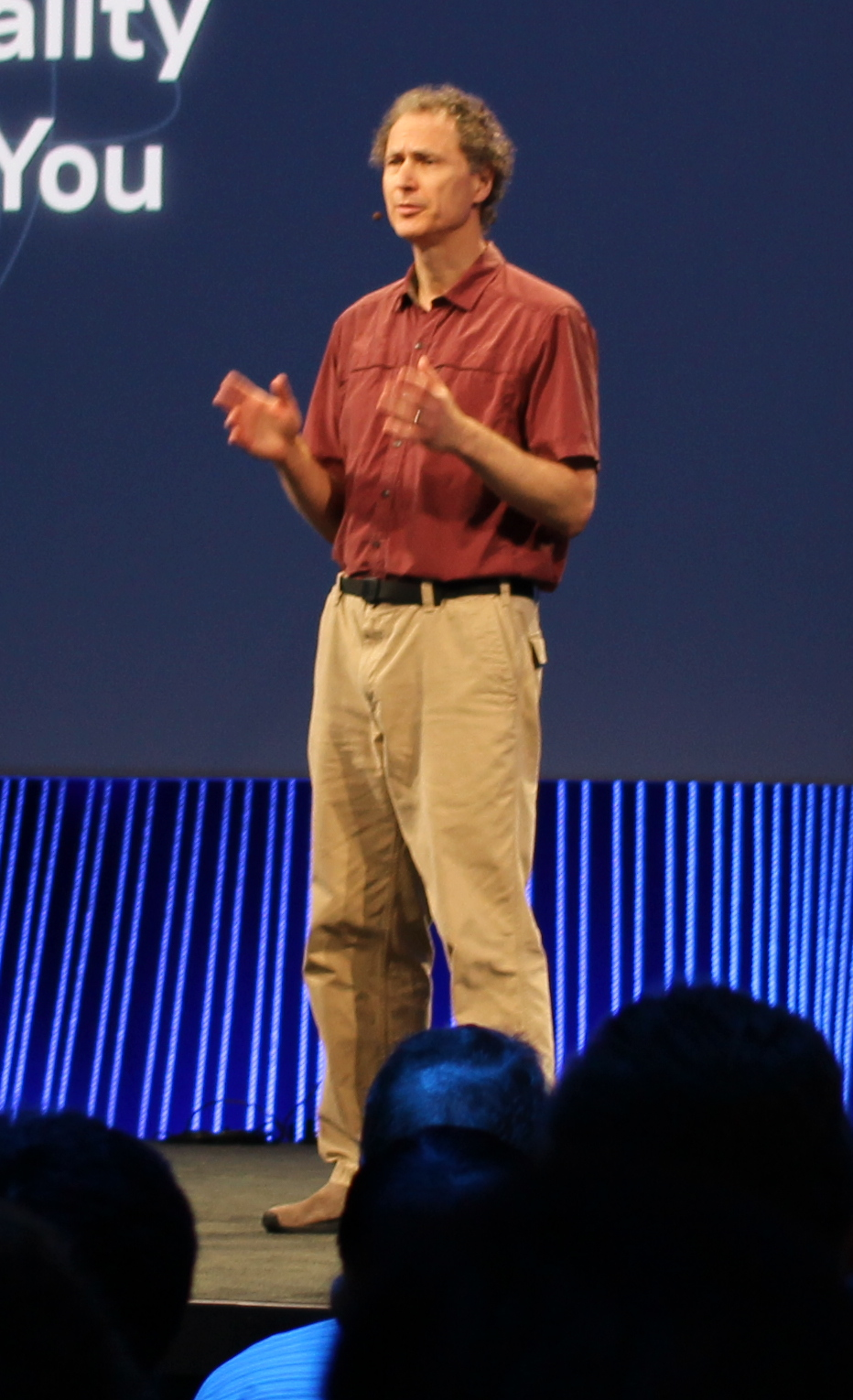
- As Oculus VR Chief Scientist on stage at Facebook's F8 2015
- Born: 1957 (age 68–69)
- Occupations: Programmer; Technical writer
- Employer: Oculus VR (2014–present)
- Title: Chief scientist

Michael Abrash is an American programmer and technical writer. He has written dozens of magazine articles and multiple books on code optimization and software-rendered graphics for IBM PC compatibles. He worked at id Software in the mid-1990s on the rendering technology for Quake. He later wrote the Pixomatic software renderer for RAD Game Tools. Since 2014, he has been the chief scientist of Reality Labs, a subsidiary of Meta Platforms.

Abrash started his career in 1982 writing action video games for the IBM PC, which eventually resulted in a 1990 book, Zen of Assembly Language Volume 1: Knowledge, about optimization for the 16-bit 8086 and 8088 processors. He began writing about programming the EGA and VGA hardware of IBM PC compatibles for Programmer's Journal in the late 1980s, followed by a column for Dr. Dobb's Journal in the early 1990s. In the latter, he introduced a method of adjusting VGA mode 13h to have a resolution of 320×240 with square pixels, which he called Mode X. He also used his Dr. Dobbs's column to write about the details of his work on Quake.

== Game programmer ==
Abrash began writing video games in the early days of the IBM PC and the Color Graphics Adapter. His first commercial game was a clone of Space Invaders published by Datamost in 1982 as Space Strike. He followed it with Cosmic Crusader (1982) and Big Top (1983), both published by Funtastic. Working with Dan Illowsky, who had previously programmed the Apple II Pac-Man clone Snack Attack, he co-wrote Snack Attack II (1982) for the IBM PC. All of his IBM PC games were written in 8086 assembly language.

After working at Microsoft on graphics and assembly code for Windows NT 3.1, he was hired by id Software in the mid-1990s to work on Quake. Some of the technology behind Quake is documented in Abrash's Ramblings in Realtime published in Dr. Dobb's Journal. He mentions Quake as his favourite game of all time. After Quake was released, Abrash returned to Microsoft to work on natural language research, then moved to the Xbox team until 2001.

In 2002, Abrash went to RAD Game Tools where he co-wrote the Pixomatic software renderer, which emulates the functionality of a DirectX 7-level graphics card. At the end of 2005, Pixomatic was acquired by Intel. When developing Pixomatic, he and Mike Sartain designed a new architecture called Larrabee, which now is part of Intel's GPGPU project.

Gabe Newell, managing director of Valve, said that he had "been trying to hire Michael Abrash forever. [...] About once a quarter we go for dinner and I say 'are you ready to work here yet?'" In 2011 Abrash joined Valve.

On March 28, 2014, three days after Facebook announced agreements to purchase the virtual reality headset company, Oculus VR published a statement saying that Michael Abrash had joined their company as Chief Scientist. This reunited him with id Software's John Carmack, who was chief technology officer there at the time.

== Technical writer ==
Michael Abrash was a columnist in the 1980s for the magazine Programmer's Journal. The articles were collected in the 1989 book, Power Graphics Programming. His second book, Zen of Assembly Language Volume 1: Knowledge (1990), is about writing efficient assembly code for the original IBM PC's internally 16-bit Intel 8088 processor; it was released after the 32-bit 80486 CPU was already being used in IBM PC compatibles. Volume 2 was never published.

In the early to mid-1990s, Abrash wrote a column about graphics programming for IBM PC compatibles for Dr. Dobb's Journal called "Ramblings in Realtime." In 1991, his column introduced Mode X: a 256 color 320x240 graphics mode with square pixels instead of the slightly elongated pixels of the standard 320x200 mode. The same column covers a VGA feature allowing up to four pixels to be written at once—something which had not been widely documented outside of the VGA specification. The article and its follow-ups ignited interest among MS-DOS game programmers. "Ramblings in Realtime" also covered polygon drawing, 3D graphics, and texture mapping.

Much of the content of Zen of Assembly Language was updated in Zen of Code Optimization: The Ultimate Guide to Writing Software That Pushes PCs to the Limit (1994). In 1997 Abrash's Graphics Programming Black Book, was published. It is a collection of Dr. Dobb's Journal articles and his work on the Quake graphic subsystem.

Abrash stopped writing publicly in the 2000s until maintaining a public blog at Valve, "Ramblings in Valve Time", from April 2012 until January 2014.
