= Archon: The Light and the Dark =

1983 video game

- IBM PC cover art
- Developer: Free Fall Associates
- Publishers: NA: Electronic Arts; EU: Ariolasoft
- Designers: Jon Freeman; Paul Reiche III
- Programmer: Anne Westfall
- Series: Archon
- Platform: Atari 8-bit: IBM PC, Commodore 64, Apple II, ZX Spectrum, Amstrad CPC, Amiga, Macintosh, PC-88, Sharp X1, FM-7, NES
- Release: November 1983: Atari 8-bit; NA: November 1983 IBM PC; NA: September 1984 C64; EU: 1984; NA: 1984 Apple II; NA: Late 1984 CPC, ZX Spectrum; UK: 1985 Amiga; NA: January 1986 Macintosh; NA: May 1986 PC-88, X1; JP: 1986 FM-7; JP: 1988 NES; NA: December 1989
- Genres: Strategy, action
- Modes: Single-player, multiplayer

Archon: The Light and the Dark is a 1983 strategy/action video game developed by Free Fall Associates and one of the first five games published by Electronic Arts. It is superficially similar to chess, in that it takes place on a board with alternating black and white squares, but instead of fixed rules when landing on another player's piece, an arcade-style fight takes place to determine the victor, and each piece has different combat abilities. The health of the player's piece is enhanced when landing on a square of one's own color.

Archon was originally written for Atari 8-bit computers and then ported to the Apple II, Commodore 64, Amstrad CPC, ZX Spectrum, Amiga, IBM PC (as a self-booting disk), Macintosh, PC-88, Sharp X1, FM-7, and Nintendo Entertainment System. It was designed by Paul Reiche III (who also created the graphics for the game) and Jon Freeman and programmed by Anne Westfall.

A sequel was released in 1984: Archon II: Adept.

== Gameplay ==
=== Overview and objective ===
C64 screenshot

The goal of the game is either to occupy five power points located on the board, to eliminate all the opposing pieces, or to eliminate all but one remaining imprisoned piece of the opponent's. Accomplishing any one of these goals results in a win.

When one piece lands on the same space as an opposing piece, the removal of the targeted piece is not automatic. Instead, the two pieces are placed into a full-screen 'combat arena' and must battle (action-style, with the players operating the combatants) to determine who takes the square. A stronger piece will generally defeat a weaker piece, but not always, and a fight can result in both pieces being eliminated. This uncertainty adds a level of complexity to the game. Different pieces have different abilities in the combat phase. These include movement, lifespan, and weapon. The weapons vary by range, speed, rate of firing, and power. For example, the pawn (represented by knights on the 'light' side and goblins on the 'dark' side) attacks quickly, but has very little strength; its weapon, a sword or club, has limited reach and power. A dragon is stronger and can attack from a distance, while a golem moves slowly and fires a slow but powerful boulder.

=== Game board ===
9×9 board for Archon

The board is visually similar to a chessboard and is laid out with nine columns and nine rows. There are five "power points", arranged at the center of each edge and the center of the board. A piece on a power point heals faster and is immune to spells cast by the opponent.

A piece's powers are affected by the square on which the battle takes place, with each player having an advantage on squares of their own color. Each quadrant of sixteen squares (e.g., A1:D4) in each corner of the board has six dark squares, six light squares, and four oscillating squares which cycle between light and dark, making them dangerous to hold over time; these quadrants are separated by oscillating squares along the middle column (E) and row (5). In total, 27 squares on the board (1/3) oscillate between light and dark.

The three power points in the middle column (E) are on oscillating squares. The two power points on the left and right edges are permanently assigned (A5 = light, I5 = dark) and are the respective starting squares for the spellcaster/leaders of each side.

=== Icons ===
Each player starts with 18 icons, or pieces, from 8 different types, arranged in the two columns on either side of the board, Light starting on the left and Dark starting on the right.

Archon icons
Light							Dark							Qty	Movement		
Name	Weapon	F (Note: Force measures the impact of an individual attack landing on the opponent, rated on a scale of 1–6, with 1 being "minor", 3 being "moderate", 5 being "great", and 6 being "very great".)	S (Note: Speed of an individual attack, rated on a scale of 1–6, with 1 being "slow", 3 being "medium", 5 being "fast", and 6 being "instant".)	I (Note: Attack Interval is the recharge time before another attack can be made, rated on a scale of 1–6, with 1 being "long", 3 being "average", 5 being "short", and 6 being "very short".)	Life (Note: Length of this icon's life bar, rated on a scale of 1–6, with 1 being "short", 3 being "average", 5 being "long", and 6 being "very long".)	Start (Note: Starting square for this icon.)	Name	Weapon	F	S	I	Life	Start	Qty	Type	Range (Note: Radius of movement, in squares.)	Speed
Wizard	fireball	5	3	3	3	A5	Sorceress	lightning bolt	3	5	3	3	I5	1	Teleport	3	Normal
Djinni	whirlwind	3	3	3	5	A4	Dragon	fiery breath	6	3	1	6	I6	1	Flying	4	normal
Phoenix	fiery explosion	5	1	1	5	A6	Shapeshifter	varies	var.	var.	var.	unknown	I4	1	Flying	5	normal
Unicorn	energy bolt	3	5	5	3	A3, A7	Basilisk	eye beam	5	5	5	1	I3, I7	2	Ground	4(3) (Note: Basilisk has a movement radius of 3; unicorn has a movement radius of 4.)	normal
Golem	boulder	5	1	1	5	A2, A8	Troll	boulder	5	1	1	5	I2, I8	2	Ground	3	slow
Valkyrie	magic spear	3	1	3	3	A1, A9	Banshee	scream	3	6	1	3	I1, I9	2	Flying	3	normal
Archer	arrow	1	3	3	1	B1, B9	Manticore	tail quills	1	1	3	3	H1, H9	2	Ground	3	normal
Knight	sword	1	6	6	1	B2, B3, B4, B5, B6, B7, B8	Goblin	club	1	6	6	1	H2, H3, H4, H5, H6, H7, H8	7	Ground	3	normal

Notes

Each piece has one of three movement types: ground, flying, or teleport. Ground types cannot move diagonally or through an occupied square. Flying and teleport types do not have these restrictions but cannot end their move in a square already occupied by that player's pieces.

Most pieces have missile attacks, except the knight/goblin (short-range swinging attacks) and banshee/phoenix (short-range area attacks). Barriers in the combat arena cycle through light and dark; when the barriers match the background color, they are effectively no longer present.

Some pieces have special abilities. The phoenix can turn into a ball of fire, both damaging the enemy and shielding itself from enemy attacks. The shapeshifter assumes the shape and abilities of whatever piece it is up against. MikroBitti magazine once wrote that the phoenix and the shapeshifter facing each other usually end up as the most boring battle in the entire game; both combatants' capabilities are simultaneously offensive and defensive, and they tend to use it whenever they meet each other, and thus both rarely get damaged.

Each side also has a spellcaster piece, who are the leaders: the sorceress for the dark side and the wizard for the light side. The sorceress and the wizard can cast seven different spells. Each spell may be used only once per game by each spellcaster.

Archon spells
Name	Effect
Teleport	Moves a friendly piece to another location, unless the piece is imprisoned or the destination is not already occupied by a friendly piece or is a power point. Opposing pieces cannot be teleported.
Heal	Heals all wounds to a friendly piece, unless the piece is on a power point.
Shift Time	Shifts direction of oscillation cycle (e.g., if squares are changing from light to dark, shift time will result in cycling back towards light); if the cycle is at its peak, it abruptly shifts squares to the opposite peak (e.g., swaps light for dark tiles).
Exchange	Swap the locations of two selected pieces. If either piece is imprisoned or on a power point, an exchange is not possible.
Summon Elemental	Summons a temporary elemental to battle any opponent piece that is not on a power point; the elemental disappears after the battle, regardless of the outcome. The elemental is one of four types (air, earth, fire, or water), chosen randomly.
Revive	Revives any friendly icon previously removed from the board after combat onto an empty square adjacent to the spellcaster.
Imprison	Imprison confines an opponent piece to the square it is currently occupying, preventing it from moving but combat is still possible if a friendly piece is moved onto that square; if the square is shifting colors, the imprisonment is ended once it matches the opponent's color. Imprison cannot be used for pieces on a power point, nor can it be used on a piece that would be freed based on its background color.

The computer opponent slowly adapts over time to help players defeat it. The game is usually won when either one side destroys all the opposing pieces or one of the sides is able to occupy all of the five power points. More rarely, a side may also win by imprisoning its opponent's last remaining piece. If each side has but a single piece, and the two pieces destroy each other in combat, then the game ends in a tie.

== Reception ==
Archon was very well received. Softline praised the game's originality and said that "it's an announcement that Free Fall does games. And it does them well." Video magazine reviewed the game in its "Arcade Alley" column where reviewers described it as "truly a landmark in the development of computerized strategy games" and suggested that "no review could possibly do more than hint at [Archon's] manifold excellence." Computer Gaming World's reviewer called Archon "a very good game, with lots of care put into its development". Of the Atari version, the magazine said that it "is a good first step towards what will be an exciting new class of game. Its play, despite the lack of depth or variation that will be possible, is fast moving." For the Amiga version, the magazine recommended both Archon and Adept for those interested in a challenging strategy game. Ahoy! in 1986 called Archon for the Commodore 64 "revolutionary", with excellent graphics and superior gameplay to the sequel.

Orson Scott Card reviewed the game for Compute! in 1983. He gave Archon and two other EA games, M.U.L.E. and Worms?, complimentary reviews, writing that "they are original; they do what they set out to do very, very well; they allow the player to take part in the creativity; they do things that only computers can do." "A great game, a classic", said Creative Computing, concluding that "Archon is one fine game". Leo LaPorte of Hi-Res—a tournament chess player—unfavorably compared the complexity of its rules to that of chess and Go, but concluded that Archon was "a very good game" that "struck a fine balance between a strategy game and an arcade shoot-'em-up." BYTE's reviewer called the Atari version one of the best computer games he ever played. While wishing for less advantage to arcade skill, and more game options, he concluded that Archon was "rewarding and varied enough to be played again and again". The Addison-Wesley Book of Atari Software 1984 gave the game an overall A+ rating, describing it as "one of the most creative and original games that has come along in several years ... It has great graphics, and will give a lifetime of pleasure." InfoWorld's Essential Guide to Atari Computers also recommended the game.

In 1984 Softline readers named Archon the most popular Atari program of 1983. It was awarded "1984 Most Innovative Video Game/Computer Game" at the 5th annual Arkie Awards, where judges noted that "few games make better use of a computer's special abilities than Archon." In 1996, Computer Gaming World ranked Archon as the 20th best game of all time. It was also ranked as the 50th top game by IGN in 2003, who called it a "perfect marriage of strategy and action". The reviewer commented: "Whether on the computer or NES, Archon is an intense, engaging match of wits and reflexes, and boasts some of the coolest battles in gaming history." In 2004, Archon was inducted into GameSpot's list of the greatest games of all time. They also highlighted it among their ten games that should be remade. In 2005, IGN ranked it again as their 77th greatest game.

== Legacy ==
Free Fall developed a sequel for the same platforms, Archon II: Adept, released by Electronic Arts in 1984. Ten years later an enhanced version of the original was published by Strategic Simulations as Archon Ultra.

The original game was rewritten for Palm OS in 2000 by Carsten Magerkurth, who contacted members Free Fall Associates for feedback on creating an improved version released in 2003.

Archon: Evolution used code from the original 8-bit version with the blessing of Jon Freeman.

In 2008, React Games acquired the license from Free Fall to develop the Archon title across multiple platforms. It released an iPhone version in June 2009. A follow-up title Archon: Conquest was released in October of the same year for the iPhone. Archon: Classic for Windows was released in November 2010 with optional gameplay elements not found in the original game.

Archon influenced Reiche's game Star Control, which featured a similar combination of turn based strategy and real-time combat.

== See also ==
- Dark Legions, a 1994 MS-DOS game described as "Archon-like".
- Mortal Kombat: Deception, has a Chess Kombat mini game that is very similar, with almost the same rules.
- The Unholy War, a 1998 PlayStation game with a similar structure.
- Wrath Unleashed, a 2004 PlayStation 2 and Xbox game with a similar structure.
