= Self-booting disk =

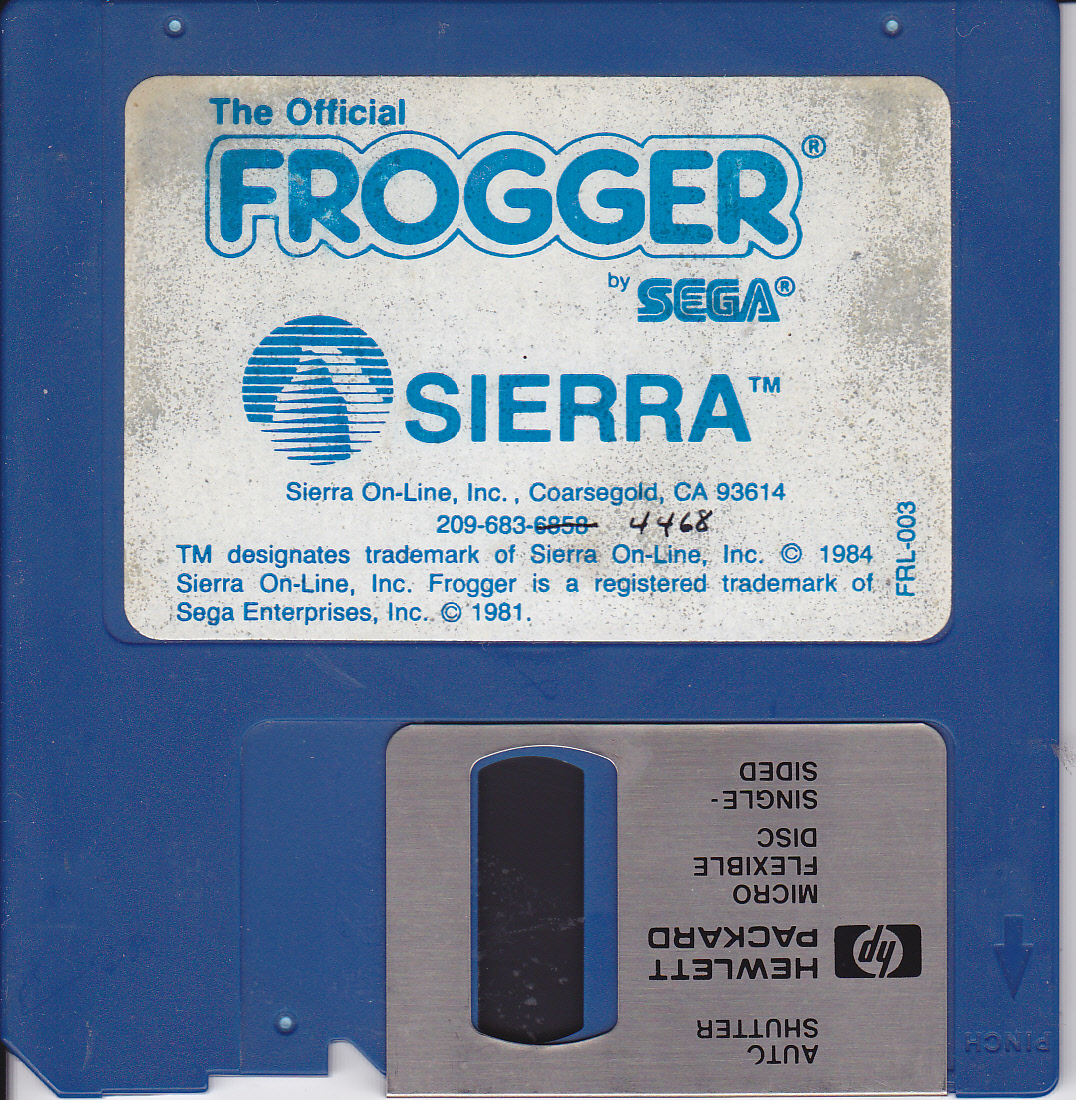

A self-booting disk is a floppy disk for home computers or personal computers that starts up directly into a standalone application when the system is turned on or restarted. It runs on the "bare machine" without loading or using the operating system (if any) that runs on or comes with the computer. This was common, standard, on some computers in the late 1970s to early 1990s. Video games were the type of application most commonly distributed using this technique.

The term "PC booter" is sometimes used in reference to self-booting software for IBM PC compatibles. On other systems, like the Apple II and Atari 8-bit computers, almost all software is self-booting. On the IBM PC, the distinction is between a self-booting program and one which is started by the user via an operating system such as MS-DOS or IBM PC DOS. The term "PC booter" was not contemporaneous with when self-booting games were being released.

== Purpose ==
On some home computers like the Apple II, software is loaded by inserting a floppy disk and turning on or resetting the machine. It is analogous to connecting a cartridge to a game console such as the Atari 2600 and Nintendo Entertainment System. It does not require using a command-line interface or other method to launch software.

It was common for self-booting disks to use non-standard disk formatting, so that the contents could not be viewed or copied via a computer's normal disk operating system. Special utilities could copy some of them.

Most self-booting programs are written to not need features of an existing operating system, such as MS-DOS, and access the hardware directly or use low-level functions that are built into read-only memory. Other programs provide a specialized replacement for the operating system.

=== Drawbacks ===
Self-booting disks require the system to be powered on or restarted to use the software. The user cannot switch between programs. The software exists solely on its own floppy disk and cannot be stored alongside multiple programs, such as a hard disk drive.

Self-booting game and applications cannot easily use computer hardware normally accessed through device drivers in the operating system. The program needs built-in support for each specific peripheral, and it doesn't automatically get the benefit of improvements or bug fixes or support for updated versions.

== Examples ==
Between 1983 and 1984, Digital Research offered several of their business and educational applications for the IBM PC on bootable floppy diskettes bundled with SpeedStart CP/M, a reduced version of CP/M-86 as a bootable runtime environment.

Infocom offered the only third-party games for the Macintosh 128K at launch by distributing them with its own bootable operating system.

A scaled down version of GeoWorks Ensemble was used by America Online for their AOL client software until the late 1990s. AOL was distributed on a single 3.5-inch floppy disk, which could be used to boot GeoWorks as well.

In 1998, Caldera distributed a demo version of their 32-bit DPMI web-browser and mail client DR-WebSpyder on a bootable fully self-contained 3.5-inch floppy. On 386 PCs with a minimum of 4 MB of RAM, the floppy would boot a minimal DR-DOS 7.02 system complete with memory manager, RAM disk, dial-up modem, LAN, mouse and display drivers and automatically launch into the graphical browser, without ever touching the machine's hard disk. Users could start browsing the web immediately after entering their access credentials.

== See also ==
- Boot diskette
- List of self-booting IBM PC compatible games
- Live CD
- Live USB
- Portable application
