= David Mullich =

American game producer and designer (born 1958)

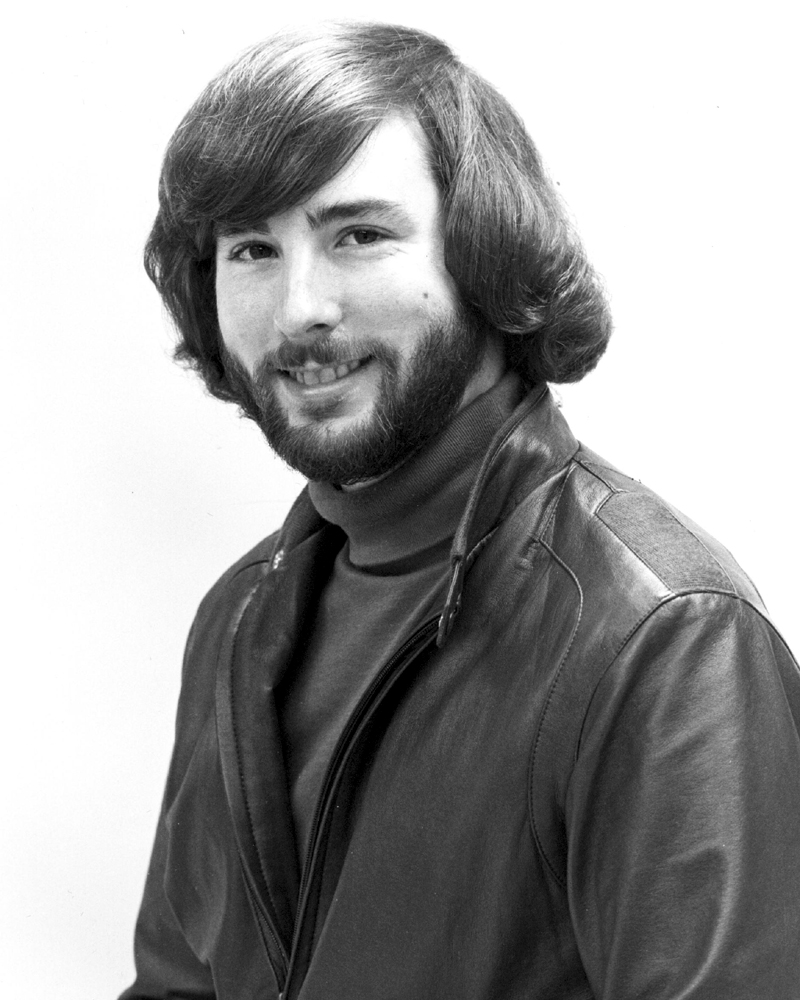
- Mullich in 1982
- Born: 1957 or 1958 (age 68–69)
- Occupations: Game producer, game designer
- Known for: The Prisoner; I Have No Mouth, and I Must Scream; Heroes of Might and Magic III

David Mullich (/ˈmʌlɪk/; born 1957 or 1958) is an American game producer and designer. He created the 1980 adventure game The Prisoner, produced the 1995 adaptation I Have No Mouth, and I Must Scream, and developed Heroes of Might and Magic III and Heroes of Might and Magic IV.

== Career ==
Mullich's began working in video game industry in 1978 when his COBOL professor at California State University, Northridge hired him to work as a clerk and programmer at Rainbow Computing, an early computer store in the Los Angeles area. Sherwin Steffin, who was a frequent customer at the store, recruited Mullich to develop games for his new start-up game publishing company, Edu-Ware Services. Upon graduating in 1980 with a degree in computer science, Mullich joined Edu-Ware as a full-time employee, and as his first assignment created the adventure game The Prisoner.

Mullich designed most of Edu-Ware's adventure games and role-playing video games, and programmed the company's EWS3 graphics engine and many of its educational programs. Edu-Ware's Space game series were accused of violating the copyrights of Game Designers' Workshop's tabletop game Traveller. Mullich redesigned the games and started a new series called Empire. Windfall: The Oil Crisis Game was an early simulation video game. He eventually left Edu-Ware for Electric Transit.

In 1987, Mullich joined Walt Disney Computer Software, where he produced video games based upon Disney characters, films, and television shows with external developers and licensees. He left due to internal politics from upper management. In 1991, he joined developer Interactive Support Group to create driving and action games for fifth-generation console systems CD-i and 3DO. Mullich next became development director at game publisher Cyberdreams, where he became involved with I Have No Mouth, and I Must Scream as soon as he heard about its development.

While participating in a game design panel at the Computer Game Developer's Conference, Mullich met Jon Van Caneghem, founder of game developer New World Computing. Van Caneghem hired Mullich in 1997 to lead the Heroes of Might and Magic III development team. Mullich led the team through Heroes of Might and Magic IV. The hero Sir Mullich in Heroes of Might and Magic III: Armageddon's Blade is named after him. With the financial demise of parent company The 3DO Company, Mullich left New World for software publisher Activision, where he worked on Vampire: The Masquerade – Bloodlines, a role-playing game based upon the Source engine. When his contract with Activision concluded, Mullich was hired by fellow Cyberdreams alumni Jamie Ottilie to be the development director of his mobile game publishing start-up, Abandon Mobile.

During the filming of Peter Jackson's The Lord of the Rings film trilogy, Mullich was a well-known member of the J.R.R. Tolkien on-line fan community, being a news reporter and film messageboard moderator for the website Tolkien Online and, under the pseudonym Ancalagon The Black, publisher of "The Complete List of Film Changes", documenting the differences between the films and the books.

== Personal life ==
Married with children, Mullich lives in Valencia, California.

== Games ==
Titles developed or produced by Mullich span three decades. Most of his games are listed below in chronological order (non-entertainment titles excluded).

=== Published by Edu-Ware Services ===
- Space I (1979)
- Space II (1979)
- Windfall: The Oil Crisis Game (1980)
- Network (1980)
- The Prisoner (1980)
- Empire I: World Builders (1981)
- Rendezvous: A Space Shuttle Flight Simulation (1982)
- Prisoner 2 (1982)
- Empire II: Interstellar Sharks (1982)
- Tranquility Base (1984)
- Empire III: Armageddon (1984)

=== Published by Electric Transit ===
- Wilderness: A Survival Adventure (1986)
- Lunar Explorer: A Space Flight Simulator (1986)

=== Published by Walt Disney Computer Software ===
- Win, Lose or Draw (1988)
- Matterhorn Screamer (1988)
- The Chase on Tom Sawyer's Island (1988)
- DuckTales: The Quest for Gold (1990)
- Mickey's Crossword Puzzle Maker (1991)

=== Published by Philips Interactive Media of America ===
- Video Speedway (1993)

=== Published by Cyberdreams ===
- I Have No Mouth, and I Must Scream (1995)
- Dark Seed II (1995)
- Noir: A Shadowy Thriller (1996)

=== Published by The 3DO Company ===
- Heroes of Might and Magic III (1999)
- Heroes of Might and Magic III: Armageddon's Blade (1999)
- Heroes of Might and Magic III: The Shadow of Death (2000)
- Heroes Chronicles: Conquest of the Underworld (2000)
- Heroes Chronicles: Masters of the Elements (2000)
- Heroes Chronicles: Warlords of the Wastelands (2000)
- Heroes Chronicles: The Final Chapters (2001)
- Heroes of Might and Magic IV (2002)

=== Published by Activision ===
- Vampire: The Masquerade – Bloodlines (2004)

=== Published by Abandon Mobile ===
- Bode Miller Alpine Racing (2006)
- NBC Sports Figure Skating (2006)
- NBC Sports Heads-Up Poker (2006)
- NBC Sports Real Golf (2006)
- National Heads-Up Poker Championship (2007)
- Marine Scout Sniper (2007)
- Freaky Creatures (2009)

=== Published by Spin Master Studios ===
- Bakugan Dimensions (2010)
- Zoobles (2010)
