= Edu-Ware =

American software publisher

Edu-Ware Services, Inc.
- Type: Private
- Industry: Video games
- Founded: 1979; 47 years ago
- Defunct: 1985
- Headquarters: Agoura Hills, California
- Key people: Sherwin Steffin (chairman); Steven Pederson (president)
- Products: The Prisoner; Terrorist
- Number of employees: 60
- Parent: Management Science America (1983–1985)

Edu-Ware Services, Inc. was an educational and entertainment software publisher established in 1979 by Sherwin Steffin and Steven Pederson. It was known for adventure games, role-playing video games, and flight simulators for the Apple II.

== History ==
Edu-Ware founders Sherwin Steffin and Steven Pederson met at UCLA, where Steffin was working as a faculty advisor to the campus radio station while Pederson worked as a student. When Steffin was let off from work in the spring of 1979, he and Pederson decided to form a software publishing company specializing in educational software for the Apple II. In particular, Steffin, who held degrees in experimental psychology and instructional technology, wanted to create computer aided instruction that encouraged divergent thinking, in contrast to current school curriculum, which he believed encouraged convergent thinking.

Working out of his Woodland Hills, California apartment, Steffin programmed educational software, while Pederson favored games. The games he created while completing his studies at UCLA. Edu-Ware's first products were Perception, followed by Compu-Read, which Steffin had begun programming before starting Edu-Ware, with the intention of selling it to Programma International. Software store Rainbow Computing, enticed by Pederson's concept for a new role-playing video game called Space, gave him his first Apple II computer, which he used to write the strategy game Terrorist and the educational program Compu-Spell, for which Pederson wrote the first version of Edu-Ware's EWS graphics engine for generating text on the Apple's high-resolution graphics screen.

The company expanded beyond the two founders when it hired Mike Lieberman, who had also worked at the student radio station, as a sales manager, and contracted game developer David Mullich, who met Steffin while working at Rainbow Computing. After writing several games for Edu-Ware as a freelancer, he joined Edu-Ware on completing his studies at California State University, Northridge in 1980, and as his first assignment created the ground-breaking adventure game The Prisoner, the product for which Edu-Ware is best remembered today. The game was also a financial success for the company, which moved into actual office space, at 22222 Sherman Way in Canoga Park, California, by the year's end. Sometime later, the company relocated to a larger facility overlooking the 101 Freeway in Agoura Hills, California.

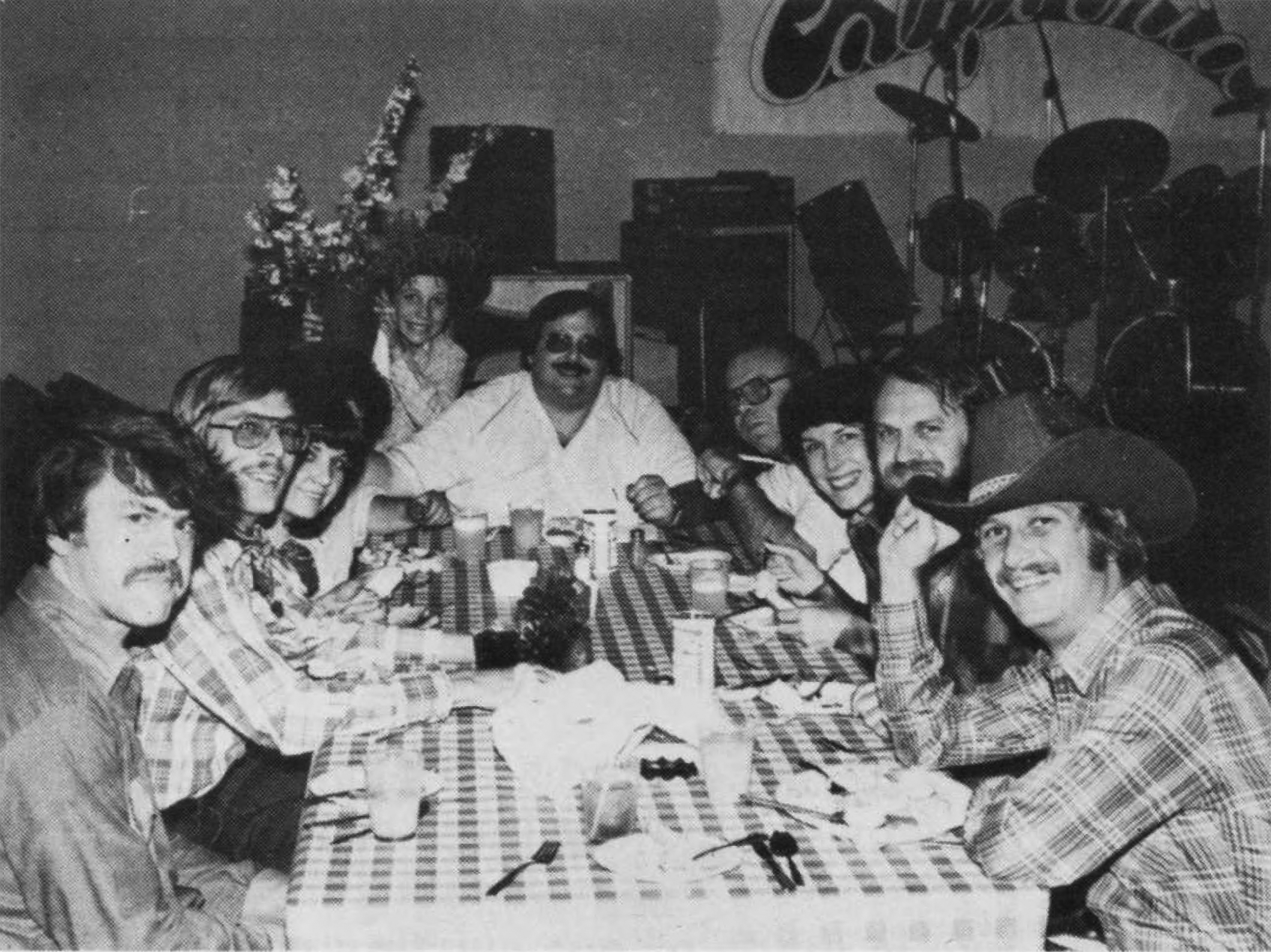
Sherwin Steffin (fourth from right) at a celebration of On-Line Systems' first anniversary, 1981.

Edu-Ware may be most noted for what it failed to publish rather than what it did publish: Ken Williams originally shopped the first graphical adventure, Mystery House to Edu-Ware in 1980. Unhappy with how the negotiations were proceeding, he formed On-line Systems to publish the game. On-line Systems became Sierra On-line and Sierra became extremely successful, based largely on their reputation in the graphic adventure genre.

While The Prisoner remained Edu-Ware's best-selling individual product during its first two years of business, educational software remained its primary focus. The Compu-Math series, consisting of three programs designed by Steffin and programmed by Mullich for teaching elementary mathematics, unveiled Edu-Ware's vision of teaching by objectives and measuring learning through pretesting and post-testing. The company's educational approach was perfected in 1981 with the release of the first in the Algebra series, in which learners choose the cognitive approach by which they want to learn. The Algebra series greatly surpassed The Prisoner in sales and became Edu-Ware's greatest source of revenue.

Despite the company's successes, by 1982 it was obvious to Steffin and Pederson that they could not continue running the company themselves. Rapidly climbing marketing costs and heavier competition from rivals like Davidson & Associates and Spinnaker Software were taking their toll. For the 1.5 million dollar software company to survive, Edu-Ware needed more management strength and expertise. In July 1983 Management Science America, then the world's largest independent software manufacturer, announced that it was purchasing Edu-Ware for a combination of cash and MSA stock, valued at $1.5 million, plus a percentage of future earnings. Having previously specialized in mainframe computer software, MSA saw the purchase as its entry into educational software, which it saw as a future growth market.

However, the relationship soon soured as Edu-Ware's marketing was taken over by MSA's Peachtree Software accounting software division, and the Edu-Ware brand identity was slowly extinguished. The final straw came when Personal Computing hit the newsstands in October 1984. The issue featured a well-publicized peach-scented insert that unfolded into eight pages, 32-inches wide, displaying a shelf of 67 Peachtree Software products, all in identical packaging. This included 45 Edu-Ware products that were virtually indistinguishable from the accounting software packaging, the only difference being that the Edu-Ware products had the word 'Education' on the box, even for the Edu-Ware games like Prisoner 2.

Steffin's protests over how MSA was handling Edu-Ware caused him to be fired in August 1984. The next month, he filed a lawsuit against MSA, claiming the company had violated securities laws in making fraudulent representations to Edu-Ware's stockholders in order to buy the latter's stock and for the promise of future payments not materialized. Steffin further claimed he was to be employed by Edu-Ware for four years after the sale, and charged that MSA undercut Edu-Ware sales to diminish the payments it had promised. He said MSA sabotaged the company by holding some products off the market, eliminating advertising and discontinuing use of the Edu-Ware name.

Two months after Steffin filed his lawsuit, MSA announced plans to sell its retail microcomputer software group of Peachtree Software, DesignWare, and Eduware, which together lost $2 million that year. MSA cited the millions of dollars Peachtree Software had spent on advertising and promotion, including the expensive peach-scented insert, as a reason for selling off the group. In March 1985 Encyclopædia Britannica announced that it had purchased Designware and Edu-Ware from MSA for an undisclosed sum. The EduWare development team was to be disbanded, and DesignWare would handle both the development and marketing of Edu-Ware and Designware products.

Steffin started another software publishing company, BrainPower, along with sales manager Lieberman, while Pederson, who had left Edu-Ware several months earlier, went on to other ventures. Mullich and a few other remaining Edu-Ware employees acquired two of the computer games in development, an adventure game called Wilderness: A Survival Adventure and a space flight simulator called Tranquility Base, and formed their own game company, Electric Transit.

Besides Mullich, another notable Edu-Ware alumni include former Apple Computer evangelist Guy Kawasaki, who was director of marketing at the company, and NASA official Wesley Huntress, who developed Rendezvous: A Spaceflight Simulator.

== Products and labels ==
=== Science of Learning ===
While Edu-Ware's attempts at applying formal learning theory were often praised, its no-nonsense approach to learning had its critics. For example, a review of Compu-Math: Arithmetic Skills complained that the program is "devoid of the fun aspect that makes computerized learning human and inspiring. The sole reinforcement is an ever-increasing complexity of the problems".

=== Interactive Fantasies ===
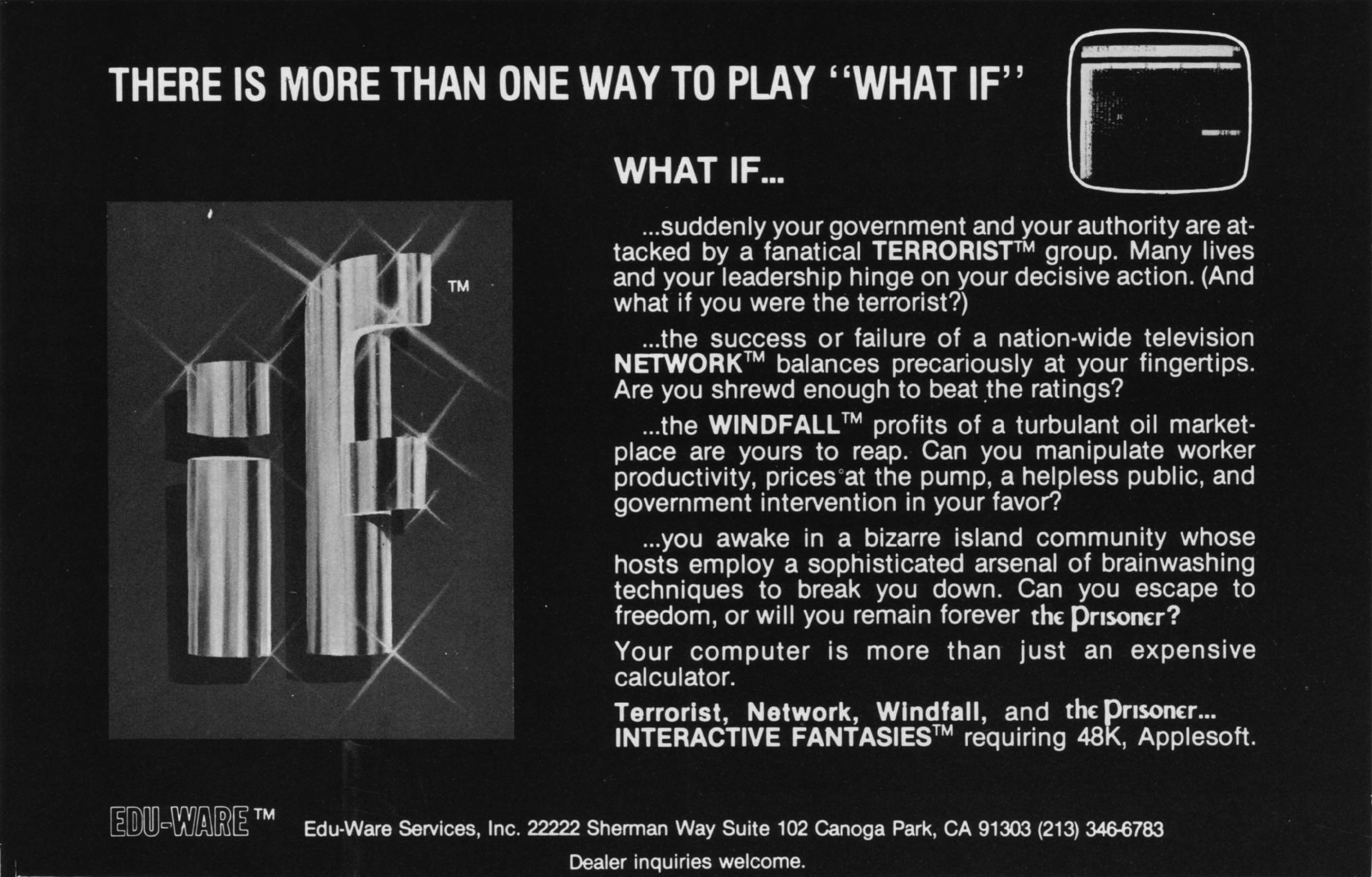
Advertisement for Edu-Ware's Interactive Fantasies line of video games.

While educational software was Edu-Ware's bread and butter, its innovative games are what the company is remembered for today. The goal of Edu-Ware's games was to "test, challenge and perhaps inspire that closet intellectual in all of us." Dubbed Interactive Fantasies, they tackled such weighty topics as the oil crisis (Windfall), television programming (Network), and global terrorism (Terrorist). Noted one magazine reviewer, "there is that residual element of reality that makes Edu-Ware stuff so good".

== Published titles ==
Year	Title	Genres	Platforms	Developer	Notes
1979	Compu-Read	Drill and practice	Apple II	Edu-Ware	Originally programmed by Steffin before starting Edu-Ware, it became Edu-Ware's longest-selling title together with its 1981 hi-res graphics remake, Compu-Read 3.0.
1979	Edu-Pak I	Educational software compendium	Apple II	Edu-Ware	Includes Compu-Read, Perception, and Statistics
1979	E.S.P.	Personal development	Apple II	Edu-Ware	
1979	Metri-Vert	Analytical software	Apple II	Edu-Ware	
1979	Party-Pak	Entertainment software compendium	Apple II	Edu-Ware	Includes E.S.P, Subliminal and Zintar.
1979	Perception	Puzzle	Apple II	Edu-Ware	Edu-Ware's first product to be released. Remade with hi-res graphics in 1982 as Perception 3.0.
1979	Rescue	Strategy game	Apple II	Edu-Ware	
1979	Rescue/War	Strategy game compendium	Apple II	Edu-Ware	Includes Rescue and War.
1979	Statistics	Analytical software	Apple II	Edu-Ware	Remade with hi-res graphics in 1982 as Statistics 3.0.
1979	Space I	Role-playing video game	Apple II	Edu-Ware	The concept proposal for Edu-Ware's first role-playing video game convinced Rainbow Computing to give Pederson his first computer. Replaced by Empire I: World Builders in 1981 when Game Designers Workshop sued Edu-Ware for copyright infringement.
1979	Space II	Role-playing video game Expansion pack	Apple II	David Mullich	Expansion pack for Space.
1979	Story Teller	Word game	Apple II	Edu-Ware	
1979	Subliminal	Word game	Apple II	Edu-Ware	
1979	Text File Editor	Analytical software	Apple II	Edu-Ware	
1979	Unisolve	Analytical software	Apple II	Edu-Ware	Remade with hi-res graphics in 1982 as Statistics 3.0.
1979	War	Strategy game	Apple II	Edu-Ware	
1979	Zintar	Drinking game	Apple II	Edu-Ware	Advertised in Edu-Ware's catalog as being banned by Rainbow Computing.
1980	Compu-Math: Arithmetic Skills	Tutorial	Apple II	Edu-Ware	
1980	Compu-Math: Decimals	Tutorial	Apple II, Atari 8-bit	Edu-Ware	Remade with hi-res graphics in 1982 as Decimals.
1980	Compu-Math: Fractions	Tutorial	Apple II, Atari 8-bit	Edu-Ware	First product created in the Compu-Math series. Remade with hi-res graphics in 1981 as Fractions.
1980	Compu-Spell	Drill and practice	Apple II	Edu-Ware	The first program to use Edu-Ware's EWS high resolution graphics engine.
1980	Network	Business simulation	Apple II	David Mullich	
1980	The Prisoner	Adventure game	Apple II	Edu-Ware	Arguably Edu-Ware's best-remembered title, and Mullich's first as an Edu-Ware employee. It remained Edu-Ware's greatest seller until the release of the first in the Algebra series. Remade with hi-res graphics in 1982 as Prisoner 2.
1980	Terrorist	Strategy game	Apple II	Edu-Ware	First Interactive Fantasies brand title.
1980	Windfall: An Oil Crisis Simulation	Business simulation	Apple II	David Mullich	
1981	Algebra 1	Tutorial	Apple II, MS-DOS, Commodore 64	Edu-Ware	The first of the Algebra series, Edu-Ware's all-time greatest seller.
1981	Counting Bee	Tutorial	Apple II	John Conrad	Repacked as Introduction to Counting in 1983.
1981	Compu-Read 3.0	Drill and practice	Apple II, Atari 8-bit, Commodore 64, MS-DOS	Edu-Ware	Hi-res graphics remake of Compu-Read. Together, they were Edu-Ware's longest-selling title.
1981	Empire I: World Builders	Role-playing video game	Apple II	Edu-Ware	First hi-res graphics title. Replaced Space.
1981	Spelling Bee with Reading Primer	Tutorial	Apple II	John Conrad	Repackaged in 1982 as Spelling and Reading Primer.
1982	Algebra 2	Tutorial	Apple II, MS-DOS	Edu-Ware	
1982	Algebra 3	Tutorial	Apple II, MS-DOS	Edu-Ware	
1982	Algebra 4	Tutorial	Apple II, MS-DOS	Edu-Ware	
1982	Decimals	Tutorial	Apple II, MS-DOS	Edu-Ware	Hi-res graphics remake of Compu-Math: Decimals.
1982	Fractions	Tutorial	Apple II, MS-DOS	Edu-Ware	Hi-res graphics remake of Compu-Math: Fractions.
1982	Empire II: Interstellar Sharks	Role-playing video game	Apple II	Edu-Ware	
1982	Perception 3.0	Puzzle	Apple II	Edu-Ware	Remake of Perception, using hi-res graphics.
1982	Prisoner 2	Adventure game	Apple II, Atari 8-bit, MS-DOS	Edu-Ware	Remake of The Prisoner, using hi-res graphics.
1982	PSAT Word Attack Skills	Tutorial	Apple II, Atari 8-bit, MS-DOS	Judith S. Priven, Ed.M.	
1982	Rendezvous: A Space Shuttle Simulation	Space flight simulator	Apple II, Atari 8-bit	Wesley Huntress, Ph.D.	First Interactive Simulations brand title.
1982	SAT Word Attack Skills	Tutorial	Apple II, Atari 8-bit, Commodore 64, MS-DOS	Judith S. Priven, Ed.M.	
1982	Spelling and Reading Primer	Tutorial	Apple II, MS-DOS	John Conrad	Repackaged version of Spelling Bee with Reading Primer.
1982	Spelling Bee Games	Edutainment	Apple II, Atari 8-bit	John Conrad	First Dragonware brand title.
1982	Statistics 3.0	Analytical software	Apple II	Edu-Ware	Hi-res remake of Statistics.
1982	Algebra 5/6	Tutorial	Apple II, MS-DOS	Edu-Ware	
1983	Empire III: Armageddon	Role-playing video game	Apple II	Edu-Ware	Packaged by Peachtree Software as an “educational” title.
1983	Hands-On BASIC Programming	Tutorial	Apple II	Neil Bennett, Ph.D.	
1983	Introduction to Counting	Tutorial	Apple II, MS-DOS	John Conrad	Repackaged version of Counting Bee.
1983	Introduction to Poetry	Tutorial	Apple II	M. David Merill	
1983	PSAT/SAT Analogies	Tutorial	Apple II, MS-DOS	Judith S. Priven, Ed.M.	
1983	Webster's Numbers	Edutainment	Apple II, Commodore 64	John Conrad	
1984	Learning to Read: Letters, Words and Sentences, Volume 1	Tutorial	Apple II	MicroTeacher	
1984	Learning to Read: Letters, Words and Sentences, Volume 2	Tutorial	Apple II	MicroTeacher	
1984	Learning to Read: Letters, Words and Sentences, Volume 3	Tutorial	Apple II	MicroTeacher	
1984	Learning to Read: Letters, Words and Sentences, Volume 4	Tutorial	Apple II	MicroTeacher	
1984	Merry Canned Nightmares and Dreams	Board game	Apple II		
1984	Tranquility Base	Space flight simulator	Apple II, MS-DOS	L. Roberts	Enhanced and re-published as Lunar Explorer in 1985 by Electric Transit.
1984	States & Traits	Learning	IBM PCjr, MS-DOS	DesignWare	
1984	Wilderness: A Survival Adventure	Adventure game	Apple II	Wesley Huntress, Ph.D.	Enhanced and re-published in 1985 by Electric Transit.
1984	Writing Skills, Volume 1	Tutorial	Apple II, MS-DOS, Mac	MicroTeacher	
1984	Writing Skills, Volume 2	Tutorial	Apple II, MS-DOS, Mac	MicroTeacher	
1984	Writing Skills, Volume 3	Tutorial	Apple II, MS-DOS, Mac	MicroTeacher	
1984	Writing Skills, Volume 4	Tutorial	Apple II, MS-DOS, Mac	MicroTeacher	
1984	Writing Skills, Volume 5	Tutorial	Apple II, MS-DOS, Mac	MicroTeacher	
