= Noir: A Shadowy Thriller =

1996 video game

- Developers: TSi, Inc.
- Publisher: Cyberdreams
- Producer: David Mullich
- Platform: Microsoft Windows
- Release: 1996
- Genre: Adventure
- Mode: Single-player

Noir: A Shadowy Thriller is a 1996 adventure game developed by American studio TSi, Inc. and published by Cyberdreams for Windows. Noir was Cyberdreams' last released game before the studio shut down in 1997.

== Plot ==
The setting of Noir places the player in Los Angeles in 1940 as a private investigator. The player is tasked with completing six non-linear 'cases' presented as the unresolved files of their missing partner, Jack Slayton. These cases can be completed in any order or concurrently. Once the player has solved all cases, they will discover the cause of Jack Slayton's disappearance.

== Gameplay ==
Gameplay in Noir is consistent with other point and click adventure games, with the player navigating the environment through a series of still images. Whilst the player may examine or pick up objects with the cursor, there is no inventory system and the game will automatically use appropriate items as relevant. The game also presents multiple difficulty levels which affect the number of hints available to the player and the context clues represented by the cursor.

== Development ==
Noir was developed by TSi, Inc, a short-lived company that developed computer graphics and proprietary software for motion capture in animation. The game was written and directed by Jeff Blyth, a director whose primary experience was documentaries shot in Circle-Vision 360° for Disney attractions and the 1989 Walt Disney Pictures film Cheetah. The full-motion video footage was filmed with a full cast, with photography taking place at Los Angeles landmarks including the Bradbury Building, Bernardo Fernandez House and James Oviatt Building.

== Reception ==
Reception

Review scores
Publication	Score
Computer Gaming World	2.5/5
GameSpot	4.9/10
Next Generation	2/5
PC PowerPlay	61%

Noir: A Shadowy Thriller received mostly negative reviews. Reviewers focused on the player's passive relationship to the story through FMV sequences, with David Wildgoose of PC PowerPlay writing that the sequences feel detached from the rest of the game, even though they are central to the plot. The reviewer noted that players cannot talk in the game, but just stand there, watch and listen. Many reviewers noted that automatic animations running when a player has the correct items to progress a puzzle limits the involvement of the player in the puzzle solving process, with Ron Dulin of GameSpot remarking that the players don't have to do anything, but just look everywhere in the right order. Next Generation agreed, noting that players will be left with the underlying feeling of being led to the answers rather than discovering them.

Retrospective assessments of the game have been more forgiving, focusing on the verisimilitude of the film noir setting. Phil Salvador of The Obscuritory noted that, in spite of the "confusing plot", Noir's presentation is "spectacular" and "really is like stepping into the gritty haze of an old detective film".
