= Metacomputing =

Computing for the purpose of computing

Metacomputing is all computing and computing-oriented activity which involves computing knowledge (science and technology) utilized for the research, development and application of different types of computing. It may also deal with numerous types of computing applications, such as: industry, business, management and human-related management. New emerging fields of metacomputing focus on the methodological and technological aspects of the development of large computer networks/grids, such as the Internet, intranet and other territorially distributed computer networks for special purposes.

== Uses ==
=== In computer science ===
Metacomputing, as a computing of computing, includes: the organization of large computer networks, choice of the design criteria (for example: peer-to-peer or centralized solution) and metacomputing software (middleware, metaprogramming) development where, in the specific domains, the concept metacomputing is used as a description of software meta-layers which are networked platforms for the development of user-oriented calculations, for example for computational physics and bio-informatics.

Here, serious scientific problems of systems/networks complexity emerge, not only related to domain-dependent complexities but focused on systemic meta-complexity of computer network infrastructures.

Metacomputing is also a useful descriptor for self-referential programming systems. Often these systems are functional as fifth-generation computer languages which require the use of an underlying metaprocessor software operating system in order to be operative. Typically metacomputing occurs in an interpreted or real-time compiling system since the changing nature of information in processing results may result in an unpredictable compute state throughout the existence of the metacomputer (the information state operated upon by the metacomputing platform).

=== In socio-cognitive engineering ===
From the human and social perspectives, metacomputing is especially focused on: human-computer software, cognitive interrelations/interfaces, the possibilities of the development of intelligent computer grids for the cooperation of human organizations, and on ubiquitous computing technologies. In particular, it relates to the development of software infrastructures for the computational modeling and simulation of cognitive architectures for various decision support systems.

=== In systemics and from philosophical perspective ===
Metacomputing refers to the general problems of computationality of human knowledge, to the limits of the transformation of human knowledge and individual thinking to the form of computer programs. These and similar questions are also of interest of mathematical psychology.

== See also ==
- Complex system
- Computer
- Distributed computing
- High-performance computing
- Meta-
- Meta-knowledge
- Meta-mathematics
- Metacomputing software
- Metaprogramming
- Parallel computing
- Quantum computing
- Supercomputing
