= 7225 Huntress =

Binary Florian asteroid from the inner regions of the asteroid belt

Discovery
- Discovered by: E. Bowell
- Discovery site: Anderson Mesa Stn.
- Discovery date: 22 January 1983

Designations
- Named after: Wesley Huntress (astrochemist)
- Alternative designations: 1983 BH · 1989 XJ
- Minor planet category: main-belt · Flora

Orbital characteristics
- Epoch 4 September 2017 (JD 2458000.5)
- Uncertainty parameter 0
- Observation arc: 55.84 yr (20,394 days)
- Aphelion: 2.8166 AU
- Perihelion: 1.8654 AU
- Semi-major axis: 2.3410 AU
- Eccentricity: 0.2032
- Orbital period (sidereal): 3.58 yr (1,308 days)
- Mean anomaly: 242.35°
- Mean motion: 0° 16^{m} 30.72^{s} / day
- Inclination: 6.8695°
- Longitude of ascending node: 275.73°
- Argument of perihelion: 203.51°
- Known satellites: 1 (synchronous, ⌀: 21%) (Note: Central Bureau for Astronomical Telegrams – CBET 1233 Photometric observations during 7 December 2007 to 17 January 2008 revealed that 7225 Huntress is a binary system with an orbital period of 14.67±0.01 hours. The primary has a period of 2.4400±0.0001 hours with an lightcurve amplitude of 0.11 magnitude, which suggest a nearly spheroidal shape. Mutual eclipse/occultation events indicate a secondary-to-primary mean-diameter ratio of 0.21±0.02)

Physical characteristics
- Dimensions: 5.94±1.26 km 6.58±0.33 km 6.680±0.224 km 6.748 km 6.75 km (taken)
- Synodic rotation period: 2.43995±0.00003 h (Note: Pravec (2007) web: rotation period 2.43995±0.00003 hours with a brightness amplitude of 0.11 mag (see unpublished data file). Summary figures for (7225) Huntress at Collaborative Asteroid Lightcurve Link (CALL) and Pravec, P.; Wolf, M.; Sarounova, L. (2007)); 2.4400±0.0001 h 2.44±0.01 h (Note: Higgins (2012) web: rotation period 2.44±0.01 hours with a brightness amplitude of 0.11 mag. Summary figures for (7225) Huntress at 2=Collaborative Asteroid Lightcurve Link (CALL))
- Geometric albedo: 0.1558; 0.165±0.016; 0.257±0.034; 0.27±0.13
- Spectral type: SMASS = S · S
- Absolute magnitude (H): 13.00 · 13.00±0.03 (R) · 13.1 · 13.33±0.40 · 13.45 · 13.47 · 13.49±0.058

7225 Huntress, provisional designation 1983 BH, is a binary Florian asteroid from the inner regions of the asteroid belt, approximately 6 kilometers in diameter. It was discovered on 22 January 1983, by American astronomer Edward Bowell at Lowell's Anderson Mesa Station in Flagstaff, Arizona, United States. It is named after astrochemist Wesley Huntress.

== Classification and orbit ==
Huntress is a member of the Flora family, one of the largest families of stony asteroids. It orbits the Sun in the inner main-belt at a distance of 1.9–2.8 AU once every 3 years and 7 months (1,308 days). Its orbit has an eccentricity of 0.20 and an inclination of 7° with respect to the ecliptic. The first precovery was taken at Palomar in 1960, extending the body's observation arc by 23 years prior to its official discovery observation at Flagstaff.

According to the survey carried out by NASA's Wide-field Infrared Survey Explorer with its subsequent NEOWISE mission, Huntress measures between 5.94 and 6.680 kilometers in diameter and its surface has an albedo between 0.165 and 0.27. The Collaborative Asteroid Lightcurve Link adopts Pravec's revised WISE-data and takes an albedo of 0.1558, a diameter of 6.75 kilometers and an absolute magnitude of 13.49.

== Moon and lightcurve ==
In December 2007, two rotational lightcurves of Huntress were independently obtained by astronomers Petr Pravec and Donald Pray. Lightcurve analysis gave a rotation period of 2.43995 and 2.4400 hours, respectively. The body's low brightness amplitude of 0.11 magnitude suggest a nearly spheroidal shape (U=3/n.a.). During the photometric observations, it was revealed, that Huntress is a synchronous binary asteroid with an asteroid moon orbiting it every 14.67 hours. The moon's diameter was estimated to be 21% of that of Huntress (or 1.3 kilometers assuming a primary diameter of 6 km).

In March 2012, Australian astronomer David Higgins obtained a concurring lightcurve with period of 2.44 hours and an amplitude of 0.11 magnitude (U=2). For an asteroid of its size, Huntress has a relatively short spin rate, not much above the 2.2-hour threshold for fast rotators.

== Naming ==
This minor planet was named in honor of American astrochemist and space scientist Wesley Huntress (born 1942), who has been NASA's director of space science programs in the 1990s, and has pioneered research relevant to the chemical evolution of interstellar clouds, comets and planetary atmospheres. Naming citation was proposed by the discoverer and published on 8 August 1998 (M.P.C. 32348).
