= Eduware =

Eduware may refer to:

- Edu-Ware, a defunct educational software publisher, 1979–1985
- Educational software, computer software created for the purpose of teaching or self-learning.
- Educational games, games explicitly designed with educational purposes.
- Educational technology, the study and practice of using technological processes to facilitate learning.
