= Compu-Math =

Compu-Math was a series of mathematics tutorials developed and published by Edu-Ware Services in the 1980s. Each program in the Compu-Math series begins with a diagnostic Pre-Test, which presents learners with mathematics problems to determine their current skill level in the subject and then recommends the appropriate learning module. Each learning module begins by specifying the instructional objectives for that module and proceeds to teach those specific goals using shaping and cueing methods, and finishes by testing to verify that learners have indeed learned the skills being taught by the module.

After learners progress through all recommended learning modules and successfully solve the minimum number of randomly generated problems, the program provides a Post-Test, so that learners can see how much their mathematics skills have improved.

The Compu-Math series also provided the learner with controls for modifying the instructional environment, such as a special remedia learner setting, pass/fail levels, and allowable error rate prior to remediation.

== Fractions ==
Fractions
- Screenshot from Numerators and Denominators less in Compu-Math: Fractions, 1980.
- Developer: Edu-Ware
- Publisher: Edu-Ware
- Designers: Sherwin Steffin (designer); Steven Pederson (programmer, 1980 version); David Mullich (programmer, 1982 version)
- Series: Compu-Math
- Engine: EWS3 (1982 version)
- Platforms: Apple II, IBM PC
- Release: NA: 1980
- Genre: Mathematics
- Mode: Single-player

Compu-Math: Fractions was the first program created in the Compu-Math series, being introduced in Edu-Ware's March 1, 1980 catalog. Fractions six learning modules include tutorials on definitions, common and lowest denominators, fraction addition, fraction subtraction, fraction multiplication, and fraction division. Each module includes the use of both common fractions and mixed numbers.

Originally developed by Edu-Ware founders Sherwin Steffin and Steven Pederson as a text-based program, Edu-Ware upgraded it to high-resolution graphics using its EWS3 engine in 1982, renaming it Edu-Ware Fractions, and later, simply Fractions. The program was featured in the company's catalogs until its closure in 1985.

== Decimals ==
Decimals
- Developer: Edu-Ware
- Publisher: Edu-Ware
- Designers: Sherwin Steffin (designer); David Mullich programmer
- Series: Compu-Math
- Engine: EWS3 (1982 version)
- Platforms: Apple II, IBM PC
- Release: NA: 1980
- Genre: Mathematics
- Mode: Single-player

Compu-Math: Decimals was the second program created in the Compu-Math series, being introduced in Edu-Ware's August 1, 1980 catalog. Decimals seven learning modules include tutorials on conversion, addition, subtraction, rounding off, multiplication, division and percentage.

Originally developed by Edu-Ware founder Sherwin Steffin and programmer David Mullich as a text-based program, Edu-Ware upgraded it to hi-res graphics in 1982, renaming it Edu-Ware Decimals, and later, simply Decimals. The program was featured in the company's catalogs until its closure in 1985.

== Arithmetic Skills ==
Arithmetic Skills
- Developer: Edu-Ware
- Publisher: Edu-Ware
- Designer: Sherwin Steffin
- Series: Compu-Math
- Engine: EWS3
- Platform: Apple II
- Release: NA: 1980
- Genre: Mathematics
- Mode: Single-player

Compu-Math: Arithmetic Skills was the third and final program created in the Compu-Math series, being introduced in Edu-Ware's December 1, 1980 catalog. Arithmetic Skills seven learning modules include tutorials on counting, addition, subtraction, multiplication and addition. The program also includes a learner management system for changing the system parameters, instructional parameters, and performance criteria. Originally developed by Edu-Ware founder Sherwin Steffin as a text-based program, Edu-Ware upgraded it to hi-res graphics in 1982; however, its name was not changed, unlike the other two product in the series.

The program's documentation put forth its educational model:

- "Instruction should be individually proscribed. Arithmetic Skills accomplishes this by changing its procedure depending upon the student profile and performance.
- "Instruction should not be text dependent." The program uses graphics so that minimum emphasis is not placed on reading skills.
- "Instruction should use decremented cues." As the student progresses in the program, decreased cues give the learner more self-prompting responsibility.
- "Instruction should use cognitive/motor stimulation." For learners unfamiliar with the keyboard, a graphical hand presses depictions of the keys on the display and a set of visual prompts are set up.
- "Instruction should be a conceptual sequence." The program attempts to achieve learning by building on acquired skills rather than relying on repetition alone.

A 1981 Peelings II review noted that while the program makes an attempt at applying formal learning theory in a way that is comfortably, easy-paced, and non-intimidating, Arithmetic Skills "is also devoid of the fun aspect that makes computerized learning human and inspiring. The sole reinforcement is an ever increasing complexity of the problems".

The program was featured in the company's catalogs until its closure in 1985.
