= Wesley Huntress =

American scientist

Wesley T. Huntress, Jr.
- Education: PhD in Chemical Physics
- Alma mater: Brown University and Stanford University
- Occupation: Space scientist
- Years active: 1969 to present
- Employer: Carnegie Institution
- Known for: Developing solar system exploration programs for NASA
- Title: Director Emeritus of the Geophysical Laboratory
- Board member of: NASA Advisory Council
- Awards: 1998 Carl Sagan Memorial Award

Wesley T. Huntress, Jr. is an American space scientist. An astrochemist and space scientist, Huntress worked for about twenty years at NASA's Jet Propulsion Laboratory. During the 1980s, he was also a video game designer, producing games for Apple computers. In 1988, Huntress moved to NASA headquarters, where he would serve in several positions, including Director of NASA's Solar System Exploration Division and Associate Administrator for Space Science.

As a part of these positions, Huntress oversaw all NASA research missions to the planets and asteroids of the Solar System, including missions to Mars, Venus, Jupiter, and Saturn. Following his work with NASA, he became the director of the Geophysical Laboratory at the Carnegie Institution, and the president of The Planetary Society. He has also worked on the NASA Advisory Council, and is a public advocate for space exploration.

== Education and early career ==
Wesley Huntress was interested in space exploration from a young age, describing himself as a "Sputnik kid" who entered the sciences in college out of an interest in joining the space race between the US and USSR. Huntress was awarded a B.S. in chemistry from Brown University in 1964 and a Ph.D. in chemical physics from Stanford University in 1968. Following his degrees, he began a career as an astrochemist and space scientist Brown University would later bestow an honorary doctoral of sciences degree upon Huntress as well, during its 2005 convocation ceremonies.

== Jet Propulsion Laboratory ==
Huntress spent much of his career at NASA's Jet Propulsion Laboratory, also teaching as a professor at the associated California Institute of Technology. He started at the lab following his PhD as a National Research Council Resident Associate, and joined the lab full-time in 1969 "as a research scientist specializing in ion chemistry and planetary atmospheres" according to NASA. His work there included research into the chemical evolution in interstellar clouds, comets and planetary atmospheres. His positions at the lab included those as "co-investigator for the Ion Mass Spectrometer experiment in the Giotto Halley's Comet mission, as the Coma Interdisciplinary Scientist for the Comet Rendezvous Asteroid Flyby mission, and as JPL Study Scientist for the Upper Atmosphere Research Satellite and Cassini missions". He was also a part of the research into molecule formation on Titan, research that was published in 1981 by Nature, as well as ion cyclotron resonance and ion-molecule reactions in off-Earth environments.

== Video game programming ==
During the 1980s, Huntress was a video game programmer for the Apple II computer, creating space flight simulators. They were published through Sublogic (Saturn Navigator), Edu-Ware (Rendezvous: A Space Shuttle Flight Simulation), and Electric Transit. In 1984 he then co-directed the game Wilderness: A Survival Adventure with Charles Kohlhase, a first-person computer game where you are the survivor of a plane crash and have to cross the Sierra Mountains to find a remote ranger's station in order to continue surviving. In 1986, Huntress was a producer on the computer game Lunar Explorer.

== NASA Administration ==
Huntress was promoted from the Laboratory to NASA Headquarters in the late 1980s. He first worked as Special Assistant to the Director of Earth Science and Applications, and then served as the Director of NASA's Solar System Exploration Division. Upon taking the position, he became an advocate for reforming the Discovery Program for low-cost planetary exploration missions, to make it more cost-effective, including the opening of proposals from private companies to participate in the running of the program, creating a public-private partnership for Solar System exploration. As director, Huntress served as the overseer and spokesperson for the development of NASA's missions to Mars that would take place over the 1990s, and the results of the Magellan probe mission to Venus as well as the Galileo mission to Jupiter. He also founded the NASA Astrobiology program.

Huntress was promoted to NASA's Associate Administrator for Space Science in 1993. As Associate Administrator, Huntress was in charge of all of NASA's space science programs. Huntress worked within the agency, with White House and Congress, and as spokesperson for the press. Projects for which Huntress was responsible for included the Mars missions he had helped to develop in his prior positions, as well as the Cassini–Huygens mission to Saturn. He remained in the position until 1998, whereupon he was the recipient of the 1998 Carl Sagan Memorial Award. Over his tenure, Huntress was also awarded the US Presidential Distinguished Executive Award, the NASA Robert H. Goddard Award, a NASA Distinguished Service Medal, and a National Endowment for the Arts design award for the Mars Pathfinder mission.

== Congressional testimony ==
After leaving NASA, Huntress continued to provide testimony to Congress regarding space funding and budgetary issues, including a series of congressional hearings in October 2003 on the future of NASA. In 2001 he testified before the House Subcommittee on Space and Aeronautics, setting forward four "grand challenges" for American space exploration. According to the Washington Times, those challenges were: "(1) To seek evidence of life elsewhere in the solar system where liquid water existed in the past or exists now. (2) To study planets around other stars (the Sun being the star of our planetary system). (3) To send a spacecraft to a nearby star, something we don't know how to do today - "but in 1900 we didn't know how to fly either." (4) To develop a plan of human exploration beyond Earth orbit."

== Carnegie Institution ==
Following his time at NASA, Huntress became the director of the Carnegie Institution of Washington's Geophysical Laboratory in the fall of 1998, and remained in this position until his retirement in 2008. His role there continued to be strategizing and lobbying for space exploration. In 2004 he was head on a report, "The Next Steps In Exploring Deep Space", which proposed a vision for a "stepping stone" approach for incremental exploration of space by humans using the Moon, Lagrange Points, Near-Earth Objects, and Mars. His research has included the evolution of interstellar medium, and pre-biotic organic chemistry on early Earth. He is now Director Emeritus of the Geophysical Laboratory. While at Carnegie, he also served as the president of The Planetary Society from 2001 to 2006, having served as the society's vice-president in 2000. Neil deGrasse Tyson took over from Huntress in the position of the society's vice-president. Additional affiliations for Huntress include the International Academy of Astronautics, the Royal Astronomical Society, and the National Academies, where he is a lifetime associate.

== NASA Advisory Council ==
While at Carnegie, Huntress continued to serve on the NASA Advisory Council, where he became an outspoken critic of reductions in the growth of NASA's science budget. For example, Huntress opined on the International Space Station, stating that, "I don't place the space station in the critical path for sending humans to the moon ... And frankly the science community will tell you it was never a very useful platform for doing science at all. It's not in the right orbit for lots of things, and it's a very noisy environment." As a result of his views, he was asked by then-administrator Michael D. Griffin to resign his position with the council in August 2006. On November 2, 2009, Huntress returned to the Council, and was named by administrator Charles Bolden as chair of the NASA Advisory Council's Science Committee.

== Books ==
In 2011, Huntress coauthored the book Soviet Robots in the Solar System: Mission Technologies and Discoveries with Soviet space scientist Mikhail Ya Marov.
