= Cyberdreams =

US video game publisher (1990–1997)

- Industry: Video games
- Founded: 1990
- Defunct: 1997
- Fate: Defunct
- Successor: None
- Headquarters: Calabasas, California
- Key people: Rolf Klug (owner); Patrick Ketchum (president, 1990–1995); Paul Licari (general manager, 1995–1997)
- Products: Dark Seed series, I Have No Mouth, and I Must Scream

Cyberdreams Interactive Entertainment was a video game publisher located in California that specialized in adventure games developed in collaboration with famous names from the fantasy, horror and science fiction genres between 1990 and 1997.

== History ==
Patrick Ketchum, who had founded Datasoft before, founded the company in 1990. In 1995, an "internal shake-up" took place in which the investors removed management and installed a "turnaround management team" that could accomplish the transition to third-party publishing. Ketchum left the company and started a career as a photographer. The company went defunct early in 1997.

Cyberdreams' most successful titles were Dark Seed, incorporating the art of H. R. Giger, and I Have No Mouth, and I Must Scream, based upon Harlan Ellison's short story of the same name. Cyberdreams other published titles included CyberRace, a futuristic racing game using the vehicle designs of Syd Mead, Noir: A Shadowy Thriller, a film noir interactive movie, and a sequel to Dark Seed.

== List of published titles ==
- Dark Seed (1992)
- CyberRace (1993)
- Red Hell (1993)
- Dark Seed II (1995)
- I Have No Mouth, and I Must Scream (1995)
- Noir: A Shadowy Thriller (1996)

Titles announced by Cyberdreams but never completed include Hunters of Ralk, a role-playing video game designed by Dungeons & Dragons creator Gary Gygax (with design by Knights of Xentar author David S. Moskowitz), and Wes Craven's Principles of Fear, based on a concept by film director Wes Craven. Other announced, but unreleased games are Evolver, an adaptation of Species, Reverence, and The Incredible Shrinking Character. Only two survived with the help of other publishers: Ares Rising and Blue Heat. Reverence was also eventually leaked as a playable prototype.
