= Carl Sagan Memorial Award =

Award

The Carl Sagan Memorial Award is an award presented jointly by the American Astronautical Society and The Planetary Society to an individual or group "who has demonstrated leadership in research or policies advancing exploration of the Cosmos." The annual award, first presented in 1997, was created in honor of American astronomer, astrobiologist and science popularizer, Carl Sagan (1934–1996).

== Recipients ==
Source: American Astronautical Society

- 1997 Bruce Murray
- 1998 Wesley Huntress
- 1999 Ed Stone
- 2000 Arnauld Nicogossian
- 2001 Edward Weiler
- 2002 California and Carnegie Planet Search Team
- 2003 Roald Sagdeev
- 2004 Steve Squyres and the Athena Team
- 2005 Michael Malin
- 2006 Scott Hubbard
- 2007 Maria Zuber
- 2008 Lennard A. Fisk
- 2009 Award not offered
- 2010 Award not offered
- 2011 Charles Elachi
- 2012 Riccardo Giacconi
- 2013 Eileen K. Stansbery
- 2014 William J. Borucki
- 2015 Frank Cepollina
- 2016 Alan Stern
- 2017 AURA "HST & Beyond" Committee
- 2018 no award
- 2019 Michael W. Werner
- 2020 Leslie Livesay
- 2021 Nicola Fox

== See also ==
- List of astronomy awards
- List of space technology awards
