= Bernardo Fernandez =

Portuguese rancher (1828–1912)

Bernardo Fernandes, later known by the Spanish spelling of his name Bernardo Fernandez, (November 15, 1828 – May 12, 1912) was a Portuguese-born Californian rancher and entrepreneur in Contra Costa County, California.

== Biography ==
Born in Portugal, Fernandez joined a ship to Brazil when he was 13 years old, rose to be a ship's captain, and first settled in the United States in 1850, operating coastal shipping from New York. In 1853 he arrived in Pinole, California, as a gold prospector, but decided to settle, operating a freight business between Contra Costa County and San Francisco and starting in 1857 acquiring land. He eventually became the area's wealthiest resident, owning more than 20,000 acres in Pinole, Oakland, and San Francisco. Among his holdings was a 9,000-acre ranch in western Contra Costa County on which he grew wheat and raised cattle; the remaining 700 acres of the Fernandez Ranch were acquired as an open space preserve in 2004 and expanded in 2010 with the addition of the adjacent Franklin Canyon property, also originally part of the ranch.

In 1859 he married Carlotta Cuadra, a member of a Marin County pioneer family from Chile; they had six children. Their third home, a 22-room mansion built in about 1894, is preserved as the Bernardo Fernandez House. He died at home in Pinole in 1912.
