= Dark Seed II =

1995 video game

- Developer: Cyberdreams (Note: Programming, sound effects and additional art by Destiny Software Productions.)
- Publishers: Cyberdreams; Emotion Digital Software (SS); B-Factory (PS, SS)
- Producer: David Mullich
- Designer: Raymond Benson
- Programmers: William C. W. Tsui; Bo Yang
- Artists: H. R. Giger; Peter Delgado; Jeffrey Hilbers
- Writer: Raymond Benson
- Composer: Mark Morgan
- Platforms: Windows, Mac OS, Sega Saturn, PlayStation
- Release: Windows: NA: December 1995; Mac OS: NA: 1996; Sega Saturn: JP: August 29, 1997; PlayStation: JP: September 18, 1997
- Genre: Point-and-click adventure
- Mode: Single-player

Dark Seed II is a psychological horror point-and-click adventure game developed and published by Cyberdreams in 1995, and is the sequel to the 1992 game Dark Seed. It sees recurring protagonist Mike Dawson's continued adventures in the H. R. Giger artwork-based "Dark World". Designed and written by Raymond Benson, the game was released for Microsoft Windows 3.x, Macintosh, Sega Saturn, and Sony PlayStation. As was the case with Dark Seed, console versions of Dark Seed II were released only in Japan, and were fully dubbed in Japanese. Unlike the original game, the Saturn version of Dark Seed II does not support the shuttle mouse.

== Storyline ==
After previously saving the world from the Ancients, Mike Dawson suffers a mental breakdown from his experiences in the Dark World. He spends a year living with his mother in his childhood hometown of Crowley, Texas in an attempt to regain his sanity, but still suffers from vivid nightmares and memory lapses. Following his high school reunion, Mike's girlfriend Rita is found murdered, and Mike is named the prime suspect by Crowley's incompetent sheriff, Butler. Mike is forced to try and clear his name, aided by his only friend, Jack. He also regularly visits his therapist, Dr. Sims; suffering strange nightmares about the Dark World and Crowley's inhabitants while under hypnosis. Upon discovering a portal to the Dark World hidden inside the mirror maze at the local carnival, Mike realizes that the Ancients have returned and are once again plotting to conquer the Earth.

Mike meets the Keeper of the Light in the Dark World; one of the three Keepers who sustained peace on the Dark World before the Ancients' arrival, alongside the Keepers of the Scrolls and the Sword. In her final moments, she explains that he must destroy the Ancients' power generator before it can empower their "Behemoth", a monster capable of draining all life on Earth and delivering it to the Ancients to feed off of. Mike explores the Dark World and reunites with the imprisoned Keeper of the Scrolls. She informs him that the Ancients have sent an agent called the "Shape Shifter" to Earth, which is capable of travelling between worlds and is the one truly responsible for killing Rita, having stolen her head to use her brain cells to power the generator.

Mike begins to investigate the Dark World in search of the missing Light and Sword, as well as Crowley to discover the Shape Shifter's true identity. Mike begins to suspect Crowley's lecherous coroner, Doc Larsen, Mayor Fleming, and Sheriff Butler after learning that they were all at some point involved with Rita, as well as local thug Jimmy Gardner. However, Mike's suspicions begin to fall apart after Fleming and Larsen are killed and placed inside the Ancient's generator, and Gardner ends up in a coma after a fight with Mike and Jack. In the Dark World, Mike learns more about Ancients' tyrannical rule, and how they have drained almost all life from the planet.

Mike's investigation leads him to the home of local hardware store owner Paul Cooper, who turns out to be the leader of the Other World cult, which worships the Ancients. Paul discovers and attacks Mike, who kills him in self defense. In his dying moments, Paul explains that he and his cult accidentally drew the Ancients to Earth; Paul's head is later severed and attached to the generator. Mike continues his investigation and learns that there is a Dark World portal located in a mirror in his closet, which has seemingly been locked since childhood. He enters the portal and arrives inside the Dark World equivalent of his home, discovering the Sword, as well as a bloodied butcher knife; he realizes that the home must belong to the Shape Shifter.

Mike meets his mother inside the Dark World home, who seemingly dies. He then meets Rita's spirit; she explains how she and Paul accidentally summoned the Ancients during one of their seances. The Ancients then took control of their minds and assigned her to recruit new members into the cult, while also reprogramming their minds to interface with the generator. Rita also explains that the Shape Shifter attended their reunion, and that Mike's first arrival in the Dark World was what gave the Ancients enough knowledge to create their Behemoth; she implores him to redeem himself by killing the Behemoth using the Sword before it can reach the normal world. Mike rushes over to the Dark World portal, facing off with and killing the hatched Behemoth before it can cross over, become invincible and grow to a gigantic size that can allow it to encompass the earth and eradicate humanity in a single blow.

Afterwards, he destroys the generator using the Light and the Sword, killing the Ancients in the process. Mike then wakes up in Dr. Sims' office, finding Sims dead and Jack greeting him. Mike accuses Jack of being the Shape Shifter; Jack declares that he and Mike are the same person—either being his Dark World counterpart or an alternate personality—and dares Mike to try and kill him. Mike fights Jack, and is killed. Sheriff Butler and his deputy arrive, and, mysteriously unable to see Jack, rule that Mike committed the murders before committing suicide. Jack is last seen riding his motorcycle in the Dark World, telling the player he'll see them around; it is left ambiguous whether or not the events of the game really happened, or if the Dark World was a delusion conjured by Mike.

== Development ==
David Mullich was the producer and oversaw development of the game, while Raymond Benson wrote its script, dialog, and puzzles. His writing drew influence from David Lynch's Twin Peaks. H.R. Giger continued to license his artwork for use in the series and suggested the use of industrial catwalks to navigate the Dark World. While the character of Mike Dawson was played in the first Dark Seed by actual game developer Mike Dawson, the character in Dark Seed II is instead portrayed by actor Chris Gilbert.

== Release and reception ==
Reception

Review score
Publication	Score
Famitsu	6/10, 5/10, 7/10, 6/10 (SAT)

Dark Seed II was released in Japan for the Sega Saturn on August 29, 1997. Reviewers in Famitsu said the game will not be for everyone. Two of the reviewers said that players may find the story intriguing to push forward as Hirokazu Hamamura said it had "unparalleled originality." Another reviewer found the translation of the game was poor and others noted that it was difficult to navigate or progress. One reviewer summarized that it was for players who were willing to explore every area of the screen to progress.

== Footnotes ==
Notes
