= Compu-Read =

- Developer(s): Edu-Ware
- Publisher(s): Edu-Ware
- Designer(s): Sherwin Steffin
- Platform(s): Apple II, Atari 8-bit, Commodore 64, IBM PC
- Release: NA: 1979
- Genre(s): Language arts, speed reading

Compu-Read is an educational program originally developed by Sherwin Steffin of Edu-Ware Services in 1979 for the Apple II. It consists of four modules training the user in rapidly increasing comprehension and retention: Character Recognition, High-speed word recognition, Synonyms; Sentence Comprehension. In each, the user the initial difficulty level, and the computer matches the display speed to the user's performance.

Steffin first wrote Compu-Read as a text-based program while serving as a research analyst at UCLA. The first version was published by Programma International but after being laid off from the university, he revised Compu-Read and used it to launch his new company, Edu-Ware. Edu-Ware upgraded the program to high resolution graphics using its EWS3 graphics engine in 1981, renamed it Compu-Read 3.0 and ported it to the Atari 8-bit computers, Commodore 64, and IBM PC compatibles. Compu-Read was included in Edu-Ware's catalogs until its closure in 1985.
