= Empire I: World Builders =

1981 video game

- Developer: Interactive Fantasies
- Publisher: Edu-Ware
- Designer: David Mullich
- Series: Empire
- Platform: Apple II
- Release: 1981

Empire I: World Builders is a 1981 video game for the Apple II published by Edu-Ware. It is the first game in the Empire trilogy, followed by Empire II: Interstellar Sharks (1982) and Empire III: Armageddon (1983).

== Gameplay ==
Set during the initial colonization period of a galactic Imperial civilization, the player chooses one of three classes (miner, missionary, or homesteader) and departs from the New York city spaceport to practice their chosen trade on the newly colonized planets.

== Reception ==
Rudy Kraft reviewed Empire I: World Builders in The Space Gamer No. 51. Kraft commented that "I cannot recommend buying the game. The general system is interesting, and another game with fewer flaws would be a top-notch product, but World Builders is not."
