= Empire III: Armageddon =

1983 video game

- Developer: Interactive Fantasies
- Publisher: Edu-Ware
- Designer: David Mullich
- Programmer: Bill Widger
- Series: Empire
- Platform: Apple II
- Release: 1983

Empire III: Armageddon is a video game for the Apple II published by Edu-Ware in 1983. It is the third game in the Empire trilogy, preceded by Empire I: World Builders (1981) and Empire II: Interstellar Sharks (1982).

== Gameplay ==
Set during the decline of the galactic imperial civilization, the player attempts to escape "the City", survive combat in the arena, and finally work with underground rebel groups in the Wilderness to defeat the Imperial forces, seize control of the Great Pyramid, and eliminate the Empress.

== Reception ==
Michael B. Williams reviewed the game in Compute! magazine, concluding that "Empire III Armageddon nicesly ties up the Empire trilogy with a superb challenge for gamers."
