= Windfall: The Oil Crisis Game =

1980 business simulation video game

Windfall
- Manual
- Developer: David Mullich
- Publisher: Edu-Ware
- Platform: Apple II
- Release: NA: 1980
- Genre: Business simulation
- Mode: Single-player

Windfall: The Oil Crisis Game is a real-time business simulation game written by David Mullich and published by Edu-Ware in 1980 for the Apple II. Based on queuing theory and released after the 1979 energy crisis, the game puts the player in the role of chief executive of Engulf Oil, setting gas prices and worker salaries, monitoring gas station lines, scheduling oil tanker arrivals, and negotiating oil prices with OPEC countries in a race against the clock to maximize profits. As with most Edu-Ware games, Windfall has an educational aspect, demonstrating the delicate balance in complex systems.

== Gameplay ==
The player has six primary choices in this simulation of oil company operations:

1. Observe Service Stations: A low-resolution graphics display appears, showing six service stations, two of which are under the player's control, while the other four are operated by computer-controlled competitors. Small colored blocks entering the queue at each station represent thousands of cars. The queue length at each station is an indicator of the gasoline demand at the current selling price and the time it takes for each station to service cars.
2. Observe Dock Yards: Another low-resolution graphics display appears, depicting oil tankers arriving at the docks. The queue length at each dock is an indicator of the oil supply at the current purchase price and the time it takes for each dock to service each tanker.
3. Service Station Statistics: A table of text information allows players to see such things as the amount of gasoline each station has to sell, how long the waiting queue of cars is, how much the rival stations may be undercutting the player's prices.
4. Dock Yard Statistics: This text table shows players how much they are paying oil producers, how efficient the oil flow from their suppliers is, how much they are paying their dock workers. Sometimes bad weather may slow down the arrival of ships.
5. Set Wages, Prices, and Purchases: Here players can change the price of gasoline, wages of their station attendants, and select their oil source from among several fictional OPEC countries.
6. Financial Status: This screen allows players to see the financial health of their company, buy or sell stock, and make an attempt at price fixing.

Strategy is based upon several simple economic principles. If players pay their employees poorly, the service time will be longer; however, if players pay them too much, prices will need to be raised to maintain a profit, but competitors may steal business away with lower prices. If gasoline prices go too high, the government may step in and set price limits. Occasionally, stockholders will overrule players' decisions.

A clock runs continuously throughout the play of the game. When time expires, the player's performance is evaluated.

== Reception ==
Windfall, like most games from Edu-Ware's zip-lock bag era, sold only a few hundred units. However, it was well reviewed, receiving an "A" rating from Peelings II magazine, which concluded, "Behind the simple displays is (probably) a reasonably sophisticated realtime simulation program synthesized with a realtime display updated. Considering the programming effort involved and the educational value of the program, it is a bargain. And it is great fun to play."

Bruce Webster reviewed Windfall in The Space Gamer No. 31. Webster commented that "If there is a problem with this game, it is that the topic may not be all that interesting to you, or that the treatment may be too simple for your tastes. Beyond that, I can think of no serious objections to the game."
