= Empire II: Interstellar Sharks =

1982 video game

- Developer: Interactive Fantasies
- Publisher: Edu-Ware
- Designer: David Mullich
- Series: Empire
- Platform: Apple II
- Release: 1982

Empire II: Interstellar Sharks is a 1982 video game for the Apple II published by Edu-Ware. It is the second game in the Empire trilogy, preceded by Empire I: World Builders (1981) and followed by Empire III: Armageddon (1983).

== Gameplay ==
Set at the height of the galactic Imperial civilization, 1200 years after the setting of World Builders, the player chooses one of three classes (pilot, businessman, or diplomat) and attempts to accumulate enough wealth to outfit a private spacecraft in order to travel to Triskelion—the capital of the Empire—and confront the Empress.

== Reception ==
A review in Softalk concluded:

Interstellar Sharks plays considerably better than the first game in the series. However, be prepared to spend an enormous amount of time developing each character. Psychologically, Interstellar Sharks wears a player down fast. The sheer weight of the simulated red tape and procedural hindrances slows the game down to a crawl just when you feel like soaring. Still, if you persevere to the end, you'll feel a real sense of accomplishment—rare in computer games but common to Edu-Ware's products.
