= Terrorist (video game) =

1980 video game

- Developer: Edu-Ware
- Publisher: Edu-Ware
- Designer: Steven Pederson
- Platform: Apple II
- Release: NA: 1980
- Genre: Strategy
- Mode: Multiplayer

Terrorist is a real-time, two-player strategy game developed by Steven Pederson of Edu-Ware Services for the Apple II and published in 1980. One player plays the government authority, while the other plays a terrorist organization in three scenarios: the capture of a building and taking of hostages, air piracy, and nuclear blackmail. Players make their moves at the same time through the use of game paddles. Winner and loser is judged by an elaborate scoring system based upon the government player's societal values and the terrorist player's goals.

== Gameplay ==
Terrorist is a two-player game that allows the players to make moves at the same time through the use of the Apple II's game paddles.

Title screen

The game begins with one player choosing to be the terrorist and using a scenario generator to define the government in which the terrorist incident will take place. For example, among the societal values of individual rights, state rights, and economic progress, the United States, according to the game puts most of its emphasis on the former, while Japan puts most of its emphasis on the latter.

Next, the terrorist player selects one of three fictional terrorist organizations to play: the International Brotherhood for Liberation, the National Fundamentals Army, or the People's Low Republic. He also develops a list of demands that it will seek from the government that it is terrorizing. For example, the National Fundamentalist Army (NFA) is concerned that a rapist/murder is not being efficiently brought to trial and punished.

Once the political environment and terrorist goals have been set, the action begins in real time. Each player simultaneously and independently calls up different options through the use of the Apple II's game paddles.

Using the paddles to control the game introduces a degree of clumsiness that was intentional. According to designer Pederson, "You are no longer the operator of a computer, you are simulating the role of a decision maker. Your decision may or may not be executed, or may be executed too late. Just because the head of state or leader of a movement gets credit for whatever actions are taken does not mean that they are in full control of all events.".

== Reception ==
Terrorist, like most games from Edu-Ware's zip-lock bag era, sold only a few hundred units. However, it was well reviewed, receiving an "A" rating from Peelings II magazine, noting the well-organized text layout of the game screens. One criticism was that the game's scoring algorithm was opaque and programmer-oriented.

John Martellaro, in his review for Peelings II magazine, noted the game's educational merits, writing, "Terrorist is both a chilling and educational use of a microcomputer... It seems a good place for this program is in a college history or political science class."

Bruce Webster reviewed Terrorist in The Space Gamer No. 31. Webster commented that "The game is not cheap, but if you think you are interested at all in this topic, by all means get it. Just be careful who you play it with; like Diplomacy and other political games, you could lose some friends if they take the game too personally."
