= Pinole, California =

City in California, United States

- City
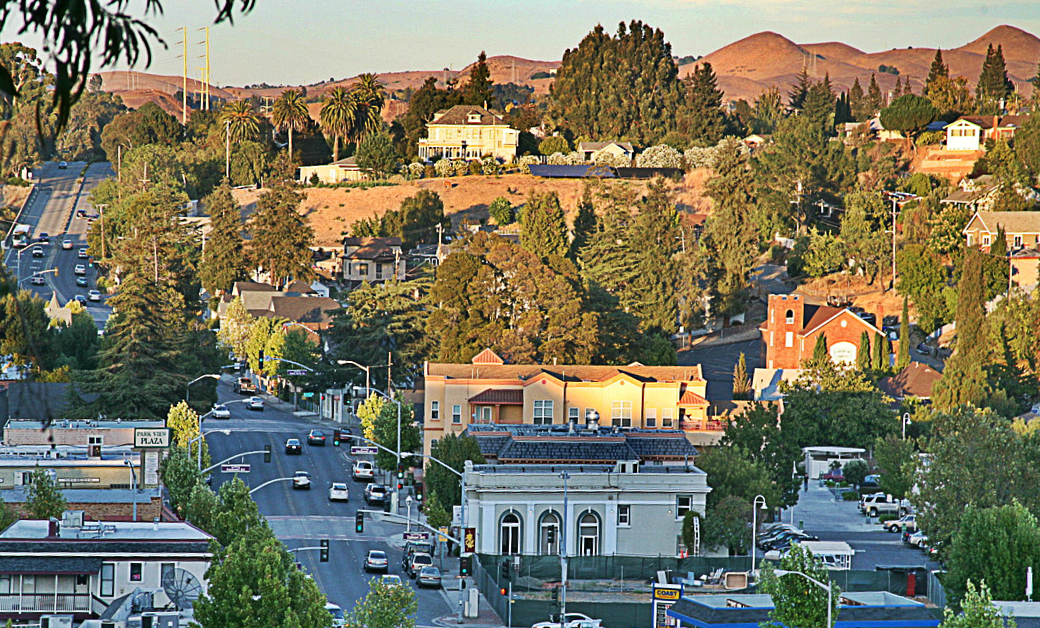
- Downtown Pinole

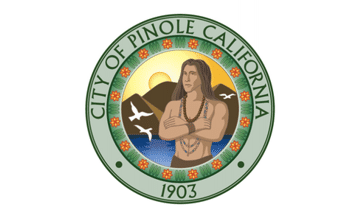
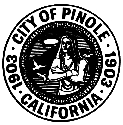
- Flag Seal
- Motto: Honoring the past, embracing the future
- Interactive map of Pinole, California
- Location in the United States
- Coordinates: 38°00′16″N 122°17′28″W
- Country: United States
- State: California
- County: Contra Costa
- Incorporated: June 25, 1903

Government
  - Type: Council–manager
  - Mayor: Anthony Tave
  - Mayor Pro Tem: Devin T. Murphy
  - City council: City Council: Norma Martinez-Rubin; Cameron Sasai; Maureen Toms
  - State Legislature: Sen. Jesse Arreguín (D); Asm. Buffy Wicks (D)
  - U. S. Congress: John Garamendi (D)

Area
  - Total: 11.76 sq mi (30.46 km^{2})
  - Land: 5.10 sq mi (13.22 km^{2})
  - Water: 6.66 sq mi (17.24 km^{2}) 56.6%
- Elevation: 21 ft (6.4 m)

Population (2020)
  - Total: 19,022
  - Density: 3,771.8/sq mi (1,456.31/km^{2})
- Time zone: UTC-8 (PST)
  - Summer (DST): UTC-7 (PDT)
- ZIP code: 94564
- Area codes: 510, 341
- FIPS code: 06-57288
- GNIS feature IDs: 277576, 2411428
- Website: www.pinole.gov

Pinole (Spanish for "cornmeal") is a city in Contra Costa County, California, United States. Its population was 19,022 at the 2020 census.

== History ==
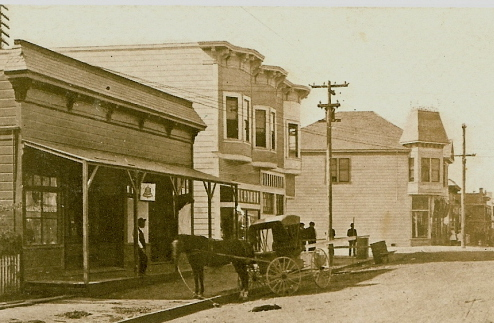
Street scene in Pinole, c. 1909

The Huchiun tribe lived in the region. In 1823, Ygnacio Martínez, commandant of the Presidio of San Francisco, received a land grant of Rancho El Pinole from the Mexican government. Martinez built a hacienda in Pinole Valley; this is land encompassed by Pinole Valley Park. During the 1850s, Bernardo Fernandez, a Portuguese immigrant, started a trading facility on the shores of San Pablo Bay. He built Fernandez Mansion, a historic building that still stands today at the end of Tennent Avenue. From these early beginnings, a small but thriving community developed into the city of Pinole.

The settlement's growth was stimulated by construction of the Southern Pacific Railroad in 1878 and the establishment of the California Powder Works in nearby Hercules. During this period, the city had an active waterfront and was a regional hub of commerce and banking. The first post office opened in 1878 when the railroad reached the community. The City of Pinole was incorporated in 1903.

During the post-World War II boom, Pinole and the surrounding area grew rapidly. Construction of Interstate 80 in 1958 stimulated developers to build new housing to satisfy demand, and the town evolved as a suburban bedroom community within the San Francisco/Oakland commuter belt. Much of its original industry was displaced during this time, and the town became predominantly residential.

Today, the town is locally known for its "big-box store" shopping district along Fitzgerald Drive, and Pinole Vista Shopping Center, which is contiguous with Richmond's Hilltop area. The downtown area still retains much of its turn-of-the-century building stock. The city's development agency is working to preserve this historic area as a tourist and community destination.

== Geography ==
According to the United States Census Bureau, the city has a total area of 11.8 square miles (31 km^{2}), of which 6.7 sq mi (17 km^{2}) (56.6%) are covered by water. The city of Pinole has habitat areas that support the endangered species Santa Cruz tarweed on the California coastal prairie ecosystem. A colony of this rare plant was discovered during preparation of an environmental impact report for a proposed shopping center on the east side of I-80 in the late 1980s. Subsequently, a plan was developed by the city to conduct replanting of this tarweed on the slopes within the right-of-way of the interstate. Also running through the city is Pinole Creek.

== Demographics ==
Historical population
Census	Pop.	Note	%±
1890	340		—
1910	798		—
1920	967		21.2%
1930	781		−19.2%
1940	934		19.6%
1950	1,147		22.8%
1960	6,064		428.7%
1970	13,266		118.8%
1980	14,253		7.4%
1990	17,460		22.5%
2000	19,039		9.0%
2010	18,390		−3.4%
2020	19,022		3.4%
U.S. Decennial Census

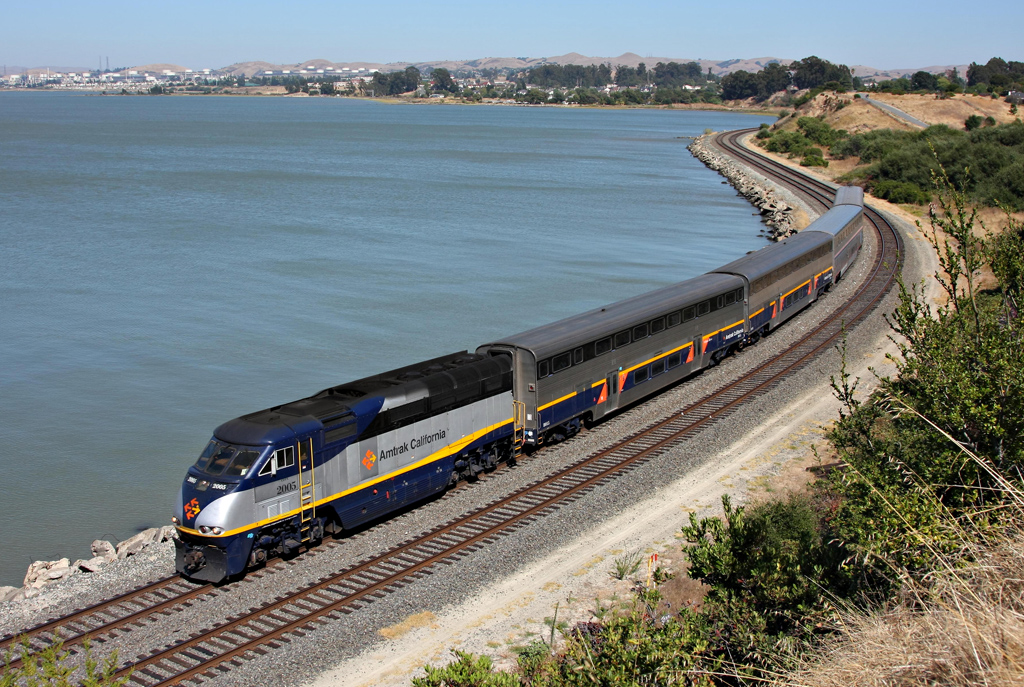
Capitol Corridor train along Pinole's coastline on San Pablo Bay

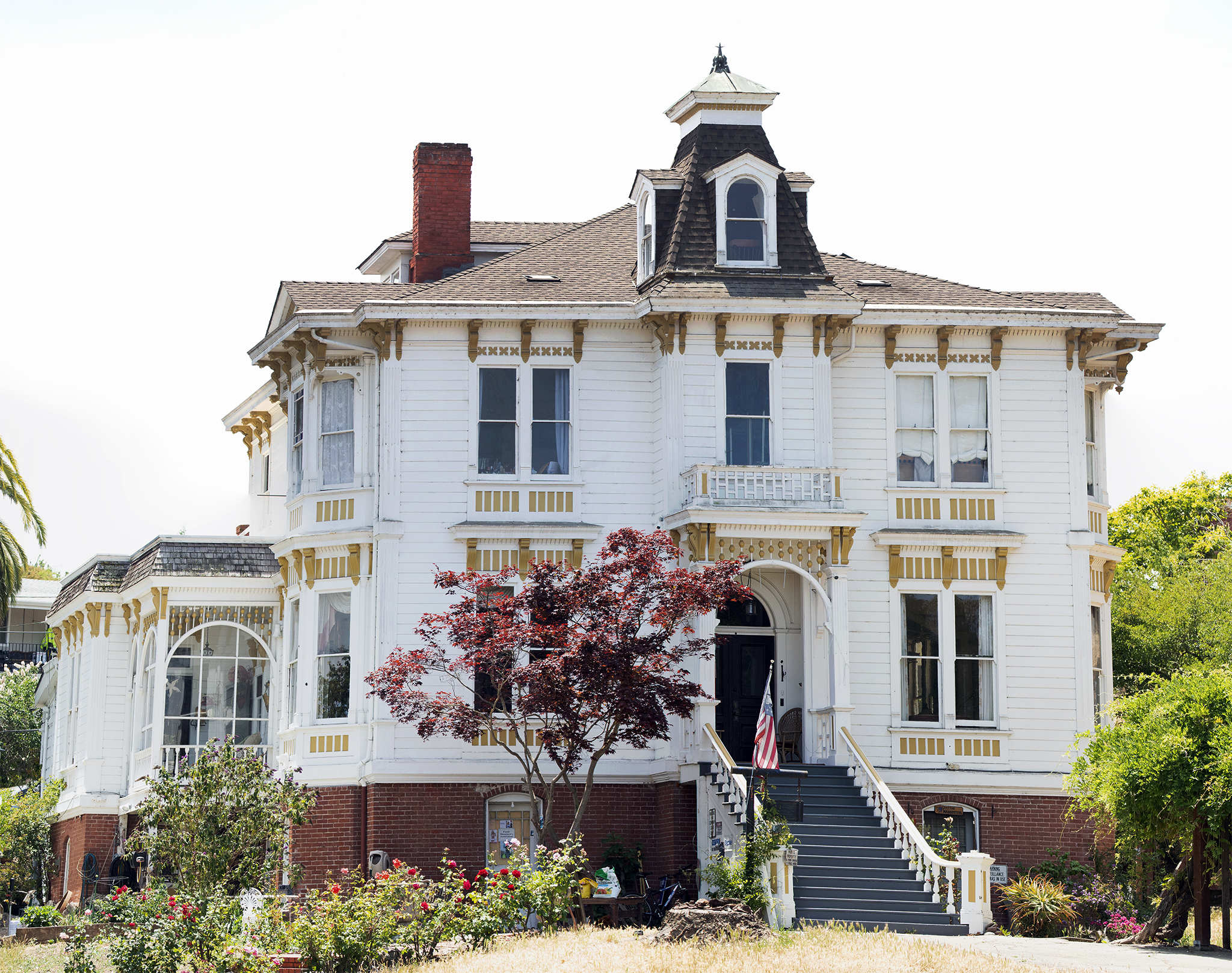
Bernardo Fernandez House

=== 2020 census ===
As of the 2020 census, Pinole had a population of 19,022. The population density was 3,726.9 inhabitants per square mile (1,439.0/km^{2}). The median age was 43.8 years. The age distribution was 17.9% under 18, 7.5% from 18 to 24, 26.0% from 25 to 44, 27.3% from 45 to 64, and 21.4% were 65 or older. For every 100 females, there were 91.0 males, and for every 100 females 18 and over, there were 88.6 males 18 and over.

The census reported that 99.2% of the population lived in households, 0.3% lived in noninstitutionalized group quarters and 0.5% were institutionalized. In addition, all residents lived in urban areas, while none lived in rural areas.

Of the 6,860 households in Pinole, 29.6% had children under 18 living in them, 50.2% were married-couple households, 6.2% were cohabiting couple households, 15.4% were households with a male householder and no spouse or partner present, and 28.2% were households with a female householder and no spouse or partner present. About 22.0% of all households were made up of individuals, and 11.8% had someone living alone who was 65 or older. The average household size was 2.75. There were 4,879 families (71.1% of all households).

The 7,106 housing units had an average density of 1,392.2 units per square mile (537.5 units/km^{2}), of which 96.5% were occupied. Of occupied housing units, 71.0% were owner-occupied and 29.0% were renter-occupied. Of all housing units, 3.5% were vacant. The homeowner vacancy rate was 0.6% and the rental vacancy rate was 4.5%.

Racial composition as of the 2020 census
Race	Number	Percentage
White	6,267	32.9%
Black or African American	2,099	11.0%
American Indian and Alaska Native	216	1.1%
Asian	4,887	25.7%
Native Hawaiian and other Pacific Islander	83	0.4%
Some other race	2,857	15.0%
Two or more races	2,613	13.7%
Hispanic or Latino (of any race)	5,093	26.8%

=== 2023 American Community Survey estimates ===
In 2023, the US Census Bureau estimated that 29.8% of the population were foreign-born. Of all people aged 5 or older, 63.4% spoke only English at home, 14.8% spoke Spanish, 4.0% spoke other Indo-European languages, 16.2% spoke Asian or Pacific Islander languages, and 1.6% spoke other languages. Of those aged 25 or older, 89.8% were high school graduates and 38.7% had a bachelor's degree.

The median household income was $120,833, and the per capita income was $52,589. About 4.0% of families and 6.5% of the population were below the poverty line.

== Arts and culture ==
The Pinole Community Players have been performing in Pinole since 1986.

== Government ==
On February 10, 2019, Pinole has 11,347 registered voters. Of those, 56.1% are registered Democrats, 13.4% are registered Republicans, and 26.4% have declined to state a political party.

== Notable people ==
- Billie Joe Armstrong (b. 1972) and Mike Dirnt of Green Day attended Pinole Valley High School.
- Luke Dennison (b. 1996), professional soccer player and FAI Cup winner with Irish club Drogheda United, is from Pinole and graduated from Pinole Valley High School.
- Travis Feeney (b. 1992), professional football player, went to Pinole Valley High School.
- Bernardo Fernandez (1828 – 1912), was an early leader in the town's cattle industry.
- Gary Holt (b. 1964), member of the thrash metal band Exodus, lives in Pinole.
- Ray Kremer (1893–1965), former professional baseball player, was born in Oakland, California, and retired in Pinole.
- Brad Lackey (b. 1953) was the 1982 Motocross World Champion.
- Gino Torretta (b. 1970), the 1992 Heisman Trophy winner, attended Pinole Valley High School.
- Don Kulick (b.1960) anthropologist and linguist notable for documenting the tayap language attended Pinole Valley High School.

== See also ==
- Amtrak California
