= Space (video game) =

1979 video games

- Title screen
- Developer: Edu-Ware
- Publisher: Edu-Ware
- Designers: Steven Pederson; Sherwin Steffin
- Platform: Apple II
- Release: NA: 1979
- Genre: Role-playing
- Mode: Single-player

Space (also called Space I) is a text-based role-playing video game for the Apple II designed by Steven Pederson and Sherwin Steffin of Edu-Ware Services. It was one of the first science fiction RPGs to appear on personal computers. An expansion pack, Space II by David Mullich, was released in the same year.

The game system was based upon the Traveller role-playing-game, created by Game Designers' Workshop, which sued Edu-Ware for copyright infringement in 1982. In an out-of-court settlement, both Space and Space II were removed from the market.

== Gameplay ==
Players begin by creating characters to play in a futuristic interstellar society and then enrolling them in one of the military services: Navy, Army, Scouts, Merchant Marines, and other Services. While in the service, players choose their character's training, provided they qualify for it. Depending upon characters' physical and mental abilities, they may learn such skills as brawling, bribery, swordsmanship, computers, interstellar navigation, spaceship piloting, and so on. Through training and study, characters can also increase their base physical and mental abilities.

Characters have a choice to leave the service after every four years of enlistment, provided that they have not been killed or suffered serious injury. After retiring from the service, characters can engage in one of the scenarios that are included with each version of the game. Scenarios can increase a character's wealth or grant possessions, but with the exception of the Psychodelia scenario in Space II, they cannot voluntarily alter a character's abilities. However, most character traits degrade over time as the character ages during gameplay. If a character dies during any of the scenarios, the text file defining the character is immediately erased from the game disk.

== Development ==
Space was conceived by Pederson and Steffin while the former was still attending college at UCLA. The two used the game concept to convince Rainbow Computing, a computer store that sold Edu-Ware games through its mail order catalog, to provide Pederson with an Apple II in exchange for receiving product at cost. When Pederson and Steffin learned that Rainbow had announced Space in its catalog before the game was completed, the two spent twenty-four straight hours debugging the game without the benefit of Edu-Ware even owning a printer at the time.

== Reception ==
Both games were well-received critically, earning an "A−" rating in a 1980 Peelings II review.

Bruce Webster reviewed Space and Space II in The Space Gamer No. 31. Webster commented that "I'm afraid I can't recommend these games in their current condition, at least not at their price. If you've got money and time to burn, though, you might get them and rewrite them yourselves - but do so at your own risk."

== Legacy ==
=== Expansion pack ===
David Mullich created Space II, an expansion pack, published in 1979. It was his first game for Edu-Ware. It consists of the character creation module and two additional game scenarios. Mullich wrote Space II as an exercise in risk-benefit analysis. The character is presented with dangerous options throughout the game, and the player must determine whether the potential rewards are worth the possible risks.

=== Lawsuit ===
In 1982, Game Designers' Workshop successfully sued Edu-Ware for copyright infringement of their Traveller pen-and-paper role-playing game. In an out of court settlement, Edu-Ware suspended publication of Space and Space II, but the company had already replaced both games with the Empire space trilogy, based on an original role-playing game system.
