= Prisoner 2 =

1982 video game

- Developer: Edu-Ware
- Publisher: Edu-Ware
- Designer: David Mullich
- Programmer: Mike St. Jean
- Series: The Prisoner
- Platforms: Apple II, Atari 8-bit, MS-DOS
- Release: NA: 1982
- Genre: Adventure
- Mode: Single-player

The Prisoner 2 is a video game published in 1982 by Edu-Ware. It is a remake of the 1980 game The Prisoner, with color and improved high-resolution graphics replacing the original's top-down perspective with a first-person view. In addition to the Apple II, this version was also available for the Atari 8-bit computers and MS-DOS. Prisoner 2 was essentially the same as the first Prisoner game, only with updated graphics and a limited number of design changes, several of which referenced other games:

- A fence (which the player may attempt to jump over) now surrounds the Island.
- Rover's appearance was changed from a white ball to that of an entity resembling Pac-Man.
- The Hospital is now home to the Milgram Experiment, which is now a special event that occurs periodically.
- The Free Information display was moved to the Town Hall; the Hall still houses the "Run the Island" task but only as a special event occurring periodically.
- The Recreation Hall has expanded obstacle courses.
- The Great Chair has been moved into a multi-roomed building called the Switchyard. Most rooms are identical to each other except for a single letter on the wall, which together spell out "Rubik's Cube". Three rooms are special: the Great Chair room itself, the switch room (with a switch to disable the music that accompanies the scrolling game text), and the exit.
- The Library sends the player on literary-themed quests for the Wicked Witch of the West's broomstick or Injun Joe's treasure (from The Adventures of Tom Sawyer), if he chooses not to burn books.
- The building that formerly housed the Milgram Experiment is renamed Grail Hall and contains items for the Library quests. It is a maze of rooms, including some that mimick the look of Scott Adams' adventure games, or that reference adventure games such as Colossal Cave Adventure (a cave with the word "PLUGH" written on the wall), Wizard and the Princess (a castle, whereupon arrival, the player is sent back to the Castle), and Mystery House (whereupon arrival, the player is told "He's killed Ken!" (a reference to Ken Williams of Sierra On-Line) and is accused of murder until granted absolution in the Church).

== Reception ==
Jeff Rovin for Videogaming Illustrated said: "A great piece of computergaming from both a design point of view and as a challenge, though the lack of originality is disappointing."

C.J. Thorns for ANALOG Computing said: "Prisoner 2 is a superb package (I dare not call it a "game") that should provide weeks of entertainment. It goes far beyond the traditional 'collect the right combination of treasures' adventure, and includes some diabolical arcade-like sequences to frustrate you even more."

Jeff Hurlburt for SoftSide said: "Prisoner 2 is a superbly crafted adventuring experience. Surely among the more complex computer games, it will repay the involved player with hours of enjoyment in a variety of imaginative, challenging, often humorous scenarios."

Softalk said: "You have been forewarned. The time and patient you devote to delving into the mysteries of the Island will be well spent. Be seeing you."

Paula Polley for Atari Connection wrote that "Eduware [sic] employees report that the CIA uses Prisoner 2 both to interview applicants and train budding spies in terrorist handling techniques" and also claimed that the game had "been used in the psychiatric field to treat patients suffering from paranoia".

Prisoner 2 was voted the fourth most popular fantasy game in the annual Softalk reader poll in its 1982 poll.
