= Bernardo Fernandez House =

Historic house in California, United States

- U.S. National Register of Historic Places
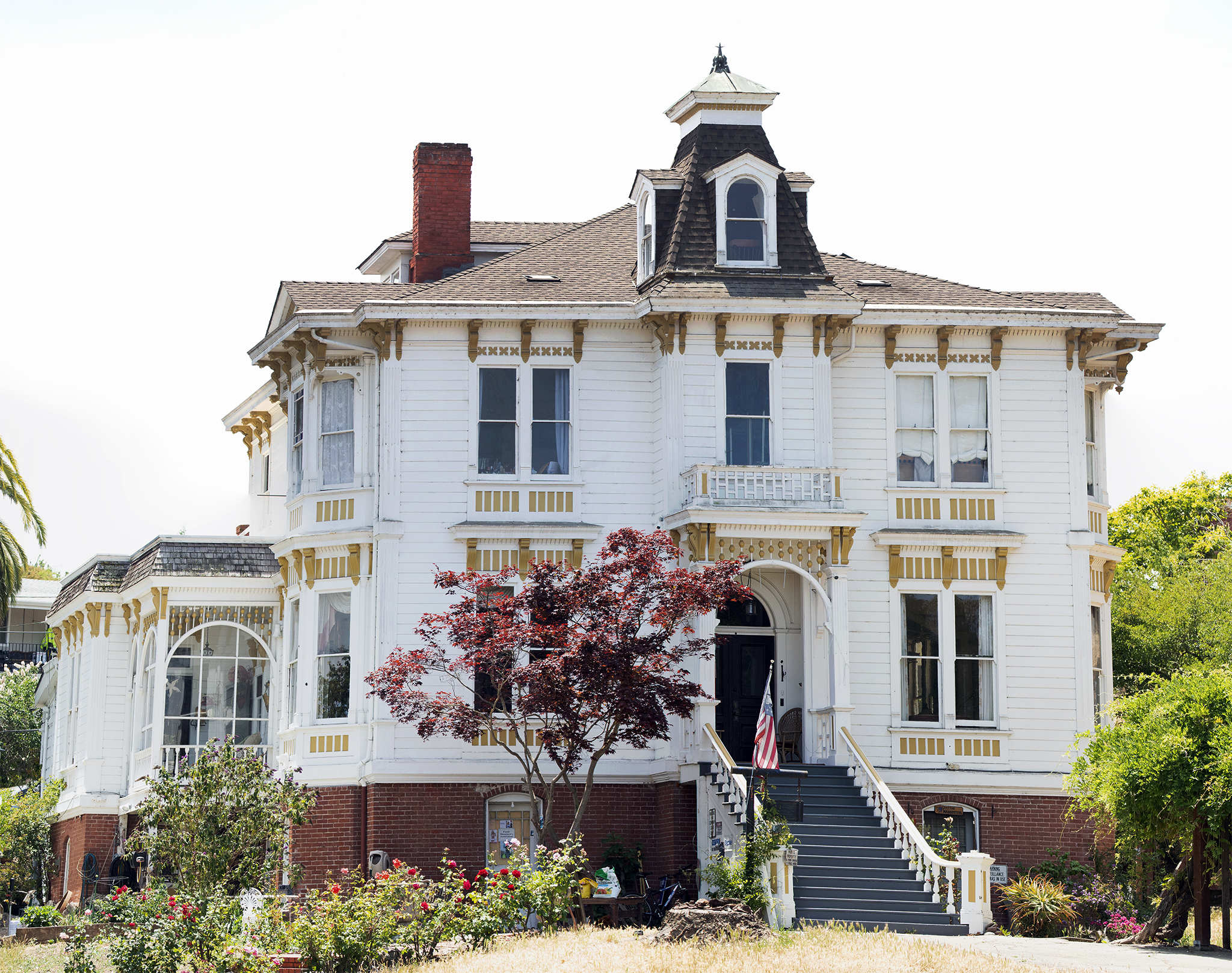

- Location within California Location within the United States
- Nearest city: Pinole, California
- Coordinates: 38°0′39.92″N 122°17′45.06″W
- Area: 3 acres (1.2 ha)
- Architect: Unrecorded
- Architectural style: Victorian, Second Empire, Stick/Eastlake, Queen Anne.
- NRHP reference No.: 73000399
- Added to NRHP: April 11, 1973

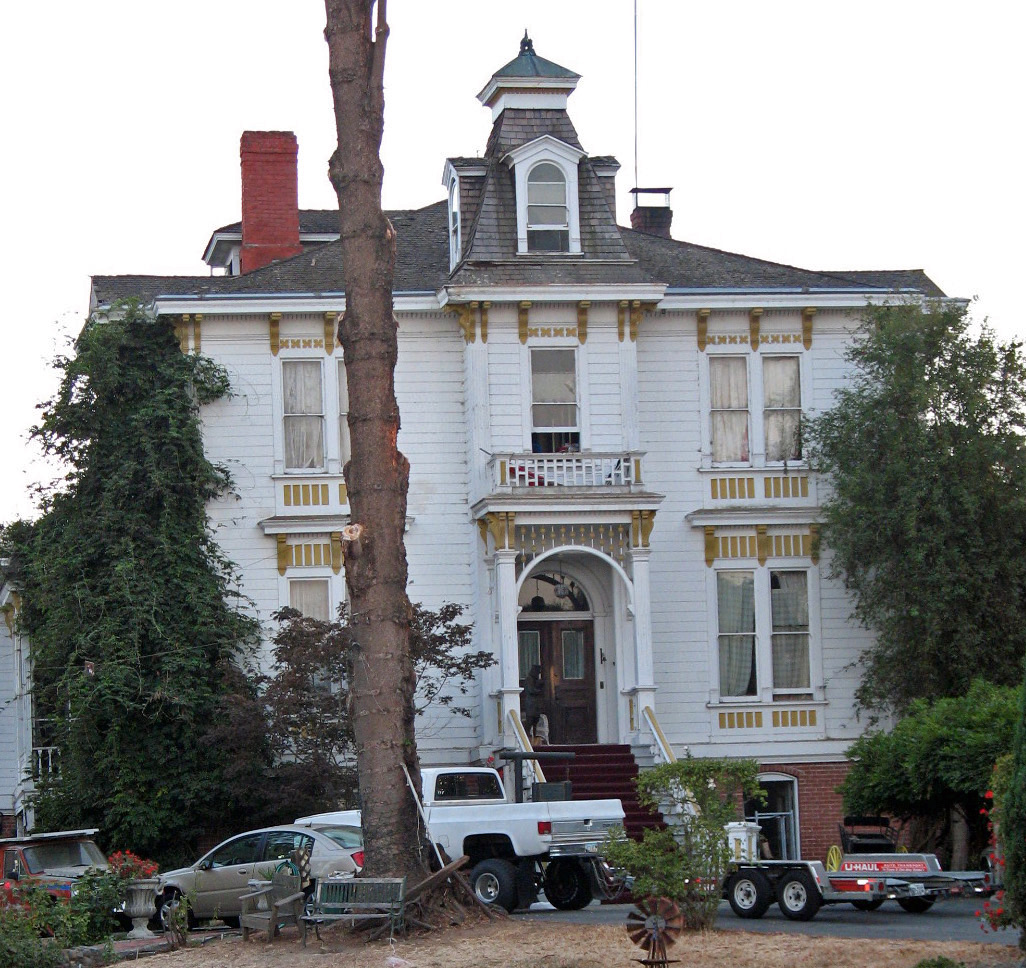
Bernardo Fernandez House in 2008

The Bernardo Fernandez House is a Victorian mansion located at 100 Tennent Ave in Pinole, California. It is listed on the National Register of Historic Places.

== House ==
The house is wood frame in French Second Empire style, an unusual architectural style in the area, with elements of Queen Anne and Northern Italian. The main structure is decorated with stick trim panels; brackets above the tall two-over-two windows on the first floor support window hoods and eaves, and the central pavilion has a mansard roof with arched dormer windows. A full-height slanted bay on the left side has a pedimented gable roof.

== History ==
Bernardo Fernandez, a pioneer resident of Contra Costa County, had the house built as his third residence in about 1894; its predecessors were destroyed by a flood and a fire. Dr. Joseph Mariotti bought the house in 1969; as of 2020 the family still lives there, raising chickens, geese, a dog named Zeus, and ducks on the grounds, which also house a 1965 Ford Thunderbird, a 1950 Bentley, and Fernandez's 52-foot schooner Carlotta, named for his wife, which sank at the dock in the early 1900s and was raised in 1976 by the Ship Lifters of Pinole (SLOP).

The house was listed in 1973 on the Contra Costa Inventory of Historic Places and the National Register of Historic Places.
