= Software publisher =

A software publisher is a publishing company in the software industry between the developer and the distributor. In some companies, two or all three of these roles may be combined (and indeed, may reside in a single person, especially in the case of shareware).

Software publishers often license software from the original author-developers with specific limitations, such as a time limit or geographical region for a royalty consideration. The terms of licensing vary enormously, and are typically secret.

The author-developers may use publishers to reach larger or foreign markets. Typically, the publisher will bear most of the cost of entering these markets. In return they pay the developer an agreed upon royalty payment.

The duties of the publisher can vary greatly depending on the agreement reached between the parties. Duties can include:

- Translating language elements into the local language
- Building demand for the software in the local market
- Produce & Design boxed software products
- Technical support of the product locally
- Advertising in the local market - this includes creating the advertising as well as paying to have it displayed
- Develop the many sales channels in order to reach the largest audience
- Market the software to the end customers

Publishers may also use developers to create software to meet a market need that the publisher has identified.

The Bureau of Labor Statistics code for Software Publishers is 511200.

== See also ==
- Original equipment manufacturer
