= Wilderness: A Survival Adventure =

1985 video game

Wilderness: a Survival Adventure
- Developer: Titan Computer Products
- Publisher: Electric Transit
- Programmers: Wesley Huntress; Charles Kohlhase; Peter Farson
- Platforms: Apple II, MS-DOS
- Release: 1985: Apple II; 1986: MS-DOS
- Genre: Survival
- Mode: Single-player

Wilderness: A Survival Adventure is a survival game develoepd by Wesley Huntress, Charles Kohlhase, and Peter Farson and published by Electric Transit in 1985 for the Apple II. An MS-DOS version followed in 1986. The game is about surviving in a harsh landscape.

== Plot ==
The background of the game's story is minimal. All that is truly known is that the player character has become lost in a wilderness area (the default being the Sierra Nevada) after his plane crashes, and must actively work to survive and possibly find a way to escape back to civilization. Interaction with other characters is scarce or entirely absent, depending on the terrain and how the player chooses to progress throughout the game.

== Gameplay ==
Gameplay uses textual input and has 300 different typed commands. In order to facilitate this, the game engine has a vocabulary of over 300 words. For example, to drink potable water one might type:

carry water	How many ounces?	1	OK what next?	use matches	OK what next?	make fire	be careful	use utensils	OK what next?	boil water	OK what next?	drink water

The player must keep track of hunger, thirst, and fatigue temperature in addition to health, which is given as a percentage. This requires the accomplishment of everyday tasks such as eating, drinking, and sleeping, as well as hunting, cooking, gathering, and finding a place to rest.

Another important aspect of the game is the item-crafting system. Many are useful, but absent. However, the game allows the player to create tools, weapons, and other items to assist in the player character's survival. For example, to use a splint, required if an injury is sustained, the player must have/acquire rope and a stick.

Many of the items, such as kindling and arrows, degrade over time and ultimately break, making the building of additional items necessary. Foods, such as meats, can go rotten in just an in-game day, but there are some which will not, due to being preserved.

The game has a non-linear structure, giving the player the freedom to progress through the game without specific goals in mind beyond attaining the basic necessities of survival.
