= Ares Rising =

1998 video game

- Developer: Imagine Studios
- Publisher: Imagine Studios
- Platform: Windows
- Release: September 1998
- Genre: Space flight simulation
- Mode: Single-player

Ares Rising is a 1998 video game from Imagine Studios.

== Gameplay ==
Ares Rising is a space combat game built around a nonlinear campaign structure and mission-based progression. Players navigate from a central hub where they select missions, purchase equipment, and uncover story developments through emails and logs. In-flight, the game uses space-sim mechanics: power can be rerouted between shields, weapons, and engines; missiles and countermeasures are deployed strategically; electronic tracking helps lead targets; and wingmen can be commanded. Multiple flyable ships each come with a unique bitmap cockpit. A multiplayer mode exists, touting persistent pilot records.

== Development ==
The game was developed by Imagine Studios, a company founded in 1995 in Austin, Texas. Imagine consisted of developers who worked on the game Privateer as well as veterans from Northstar, Bethesda and others. Ares Rising used the MythOS engine that was developed by Charybdis Enterprises for the game iM1A2 Abrams.

In March 1998, Advanced Micro Devices reached an agreement with Imagine Studios to optimize the game with AMD's K6-3D microprocessor. The game went gold on August 11, 1998.

== Reception ==
Reception

Review scores
Publication	Score
Computer Gaming World	3.5/5
Computer Games Magazine	2.5/5
GameSpot	5.8/10
GameStar	35%
PC Gamer	59%

GameSpot gave the game a score of 5.8 out of 10' stating: "And what with this game having at least three competitors that offer gameplay that's at least every bit as good, along with some of the most incredible graphics to date, Ares Rising must be approached only with deliberation and skepticism"
