= Rendezvous: A Space Shuttle Simulation =

1982 video game

Shuttle
- Developers: Titan Computer Products, Wesley Huntress
- Publisher: Edu-Ware
- Platform: Apple II
- Release: 1982
- Genre: Flight simulator
- Mode: Single player

Rendezvous: A Space Shuttle Simulation, is a space simulator published 1982 by Edu-Ware, and developed by Titan Computer Products and NASA scientist Wesley Huntress.

== Description ==
Accompanied by a thick "Spacecraft Operations" manual with a chapter on use in the classroom, this flight simulator was marketed as being as educational as it was fun to play.

The simulation is centered on a typical Space Shuttle mission to service a space station. Mission phases include Earth Lift-Off, Orbital Rendezvous, Approach and Alignment and Docking.

It was released for the Apple II in 1982, receiving positive feedback from reviewers.

== Reception ==
Stanley Greenlaw reviewed the game for Computer Gaming World, and stated that "Rendezvous is educational while being entertaining. Teachers will find it a valuable teaching tool in the areas of General Science, Earth Science, and Physics. As entertainment the simulation will appeal to gamers who enjoy mental challenges (such as those involved in setting up the orbital rendezvous) as well as to gamers who enjoy hand-eye co-ordination challenges (such as will be faced in the approach and docking segments). Rendezvous is a welcome addition to the educational and entertainment software field."

== See also ==
- Space Shuttle: A Journey into Space
