= Charles Kohlhase =

American engineer

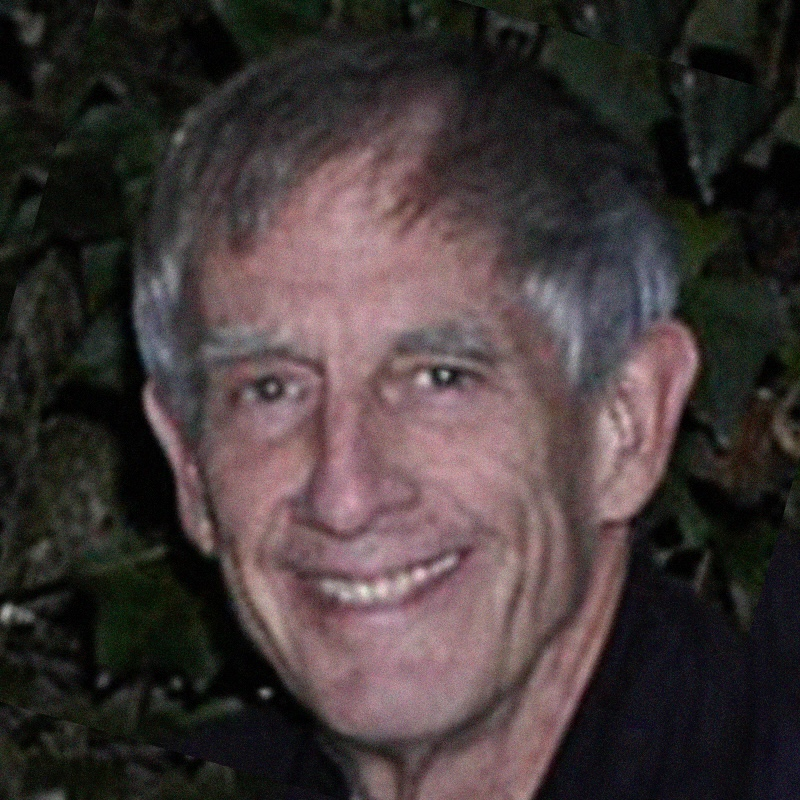
- Kohlhase in 2004
- Born: 1935 (age 90–91)
- Citizenship: American
- Education: Georgia Institute of Technology, UCLA
- Known for: design of deep-space missions
- Awards: NASA Distinguished Service Medal
- Scientific career
- Fields: Aerospace engineering
- Workplaces: Jet Propulsion Laboratory, California Institute of Technology

Charles Kohlhase (born 1935) is an American aerospace engineer who worked for forty years at NASA/JPL leading the design of several robotic deep-space planetary missions. He is also an author, game developer and lecturer.

== Early life ==
Kohlhase graduated with honors from The McCallie School in Chattanooga, Tennessee in 1953, with honors for a BS degree in Physics from the Georgia Institute of Technology in 1957, and with a Masters of Engineering degree from UCLA in 1968. He served as a LTJG on the US Navy aircraft carriers Essex and Independence from 1957–1959 as the assistant electrical officer of a nuclear weapons team.

== Work at the NASA Jet Propulsion Laboratory ==
Kohlhase led the design of many deep-space missions during his extended career, including Mariner, Viking, Voyager, and Cassini missions. For his sustained robotic exploration contributions over the last 40 years of the 20th century and solid success record, he received the NASA Distinguished Service Medal and has an asteroid, 13801 Kohlhase, named in his honor. The official naming citation was published by the Minor Planet Center on January 6, 2003 (M.P.C. 47300). He managed and guided the team which designed the spacecraft for the Voyager program to the outer planets and their moons and rings. After Voyager, Kohlhase became the science and mission design manager for the international Cassini–Huygens mission to Saturn and Titan. Following the launch, cruise, and Saturn orbit phases of Cassini, he has continued to advise NASA/JPL on numerous missions to Mars and to other worlds. In addition to his counsel on various review boards, Kohlhase has chaired the Mars Program Systems Engineering Team, composed of many senior experts spanning diverse disciplines. He is also a member of the Advisory Council for The Planetary Society.

He partnered with Jim Blinn in creating computer graphic animations of the Voyager spacecraft encounters and for the Carl Sagan Cosmos TV series. He has directed many public activities that creatively blend art, science, and education, including international projects sponsored by the NEA, NASA, Dept of Education, and other agencies.

Kohlhase was also a member of Voyager team honored with an Emmy for The Farthest (2017), by the National Academy of Television Arts & Sciences at their 39th Annual News & Documentary Emmy Awards in New York, N.Y., on October 1, 2018

== Selected writings ==
- Kohlhase, Charles (2016). The Complete Rocket Scientist. Published by instant Publishing Company, Collierville, TN. Copyright TXu000934567 dated 2/10/2000.
- Kohlhase, Charles (1998). The Cassini/Huygens mission to Saturn and Titan pocket reference: postlaunch update. NASA/JPL. OCLC 39086168.
- Kohlhase, Charles (1989). The Voyager Neptune travel guide. NASA/JPL. Bibcode:1989vntg.book.....K. OCLC 20317256.
- Kohlhase, Charles (1985). Word pursuit: Based on the original Hinky Pinky word game. Monarch Press. ISBN 978-0-671-52512-5.
