= List of role-playing video games: 1975 to 1985 =

This is a comprehensive index of commercial role-playing video games (RPGs), sorted chronologically by year. Information regarding release platform, release type, RPG subgenre, game setting, developers, publishers, and country of origin is provided where available. The table can be sorted by clicking on the small boxes next to the column headings.

This list includes all RPG subgenres, including MMORPGs, Action RPGs and Tactical RPGs. This list does not include MUDs and Roguelikes by default, unless they have an additional RPG subgenre. For standalone lists on these subgenres, see List of MUDs and List of roguelikes

== Legend ==
Video game platforms
AMI	Amiga	APPII	Apple II	Arcade	Arcade video game
ATR	Atari 8-bit computers	ATR26	Atari 2600, Atari 2800	ATRST	Atari ST, Atari Falcon
C64	Commodore 64	CLV	ColecoVision, Coleco Adam	CPC	Amstrad CPC
DG32	Term not found	DOS	PC DOS / MS-DOS, Windows 3.X	FM7	FM-7
IBM	IBM PC, IBM PC compatible	INT	Intellivision	MAC	Classic Mac OS, 2001 and before
MAIN	Mainframe computer	MSX	MSX	MSX2	MSX2
NES	Nintendo Entertainment System / Famicom	PC88	PC-8800 series	PC98	PC-9800 series
PET	Commodore PET	PLATO	PLATO	TI99	TI-99/4A
TRS80	TRS-80	TRSCC	TRS-80 Color Computer	UNIX	Unix
VIC20	VIC-20	X1	Sharp X1	ZX	ZX Spectrum
ZX81	ZX81				

Types of releases
Compilation	A compilation, anthology or collection of several titles, usually (but not always) belonging to the same series
Early access	A game launched in early access is unfinished and thus might contain bugs and glitches or have some of the content missing
Episodic	An episodic video game that is released in batches over a period of time
Expansion	A large-scale DLC to an already existing game that adds new story, areas and additions and/or changes to the game's mechanics
Full release	A full release of a game that launched in early access first
Limited	A special release (often called "Limited" or "Collector's Edition") with bonus collector's material. Often provided to people who pre-order a game
Port	The game first appeared on a different platform and a port was made. The game is like the original, with few or no differences
Remake	The game is an enhanced remake of an original, made using a new engine and/or assets and thus containing completely new sound, graphics and possibly changes to the story and/or gameplay
Remaster	The game is a remaster of an original, released on the same or different platform, with (usually minor) changes to graphics, sound and/or gameplay
Rerelease	The game was re-released on the same platform with no or only minor changes

Video game genres
Action RPG	Action role-playing game	Dungeon crawl	Dungeon crawl	JRPG	Japanese-style role-playing game
MMORPG	Massively multiplayer online RPG	Monster tamer	Monster-taming game	MUD	Multi-user dungeon
Real-time	Real-time game	Roguelike	Roguelike, Roguelite	Sandbox	Sandbox game
Soulslike	Soulslike	Tactical RPG	Tactical role-playing game	Turn-based	Turn-based game

== List ==
Year	Title	Developer	Publisher	Setting	Platform	Subgenre	Series/Notes	COO
1975 (NA)	dnd	Gary Whisenhunt, Ray Wood, Dirk Pellett, Flint Pellett		Fantasy	PLATO			US
1975 (NA)	m199h			Fantasy	PLATO		Later deleted and lost to history.	US
1975 (NA)	Dungeon	Don Daglow		Fantasy	MAIN			US
1975 (NA)	Dungeon	John Daleske, others		Fantasy	PLATO			US
1975 (NA)	Moria	Kevet Duncombe, others		Fantasy	PLATO			US
1975 (NA)	pedit5	Rusty Rutherford		Fantasy	PLATO			US
1975 (NA)	orthanc	Eric Hagstrom, Larry Kemp, Paul Resch		Fantasy	PLATO		Named after Saruman's tower in The Lord of the Rings. Based on pedit5.	US
1977 (NA)	Oubliette	Jim Schwaiger		Fantasy	PLATO		"Oubliette" is French for "dungeon".	US
1977 (NA)	DND	Daniel M Lawrence		Fantasy	MAIN			US
1978 (NA)	Beneath Apple Manor		Software Factory	Fantasy	APPII	Roguelike	Lo-res/Text mode graphics.	US
1979 (NA)	avatar	Bruce Maggs, Andrew Shapira, David Sides		Fantasy	PLATO			US
1979 (NA)	Dungeon of Death		Instant Software, Inc	Fantasy	PET	Dungeon crawl	Based on the PLATO game DND.	US
1979 (NA)	Dunjonquest: The Datestones of Ryn	Epyx	Epyx	Fantasy	APPII, PET, TRS80			US
1979 (NA)	Dunjonquest: Morloc's Tower	Epyx	Epyx	Fantasy	APPII, PET, TRS80			US
1979 (NA)	Space I	Edu-Ware	Edu-Ware	Sci-Fi	APPII		An adaptation of Traveller, which was taken off the market after a lawsuit by Game Designers Workshop.	US
1979 (NA)	Space II	Edu-Ware	Edu-Ware	Sci-Fi	APPII		Expansion to Space.	US
1979 (NA)	Temple of Apshai	Epyx	Epyx	Fantasy	PET, TRS80	Dungeon crawl	Series debuts.	US
1979 (NA)	Wilderness Campaign	Synergistic Software	Synergistic Software	Fantasy	APPII		Sequel to Dungeon Campaign for Apple II	US
1980 (NA)	Akalabeth: World of Doom	Richard Garriott	California Pacific	Fantasy	APPII, DOS		Known as Ultima 0 in the 1998 Ultima compilation	US
1980 (NA)	Dunjonquest: The Datestones of Ryn	Epyx	Epyx	Fantasy	ATR (Port)	Dungeon crawl		US
1980 (NA)	Eamon	Donald Brown		Fantasy	APPII	Adventure-RPG	Adventure-RPG construction system.	US
1980 (NA)	Fracas	Quality (Stuart Smith)	Computersmiths	Fantasy	APPII			US
1980 (NA)	Rogue	Michael Toy, et al.	Various	Fantasy	UNIX	Roguelike	This was the beginning of roguelike computer games. For further developments see Chronology of roguelike video games.	US
1980 (NA)	Dunjonquest: Hellfire Warrior	Epyx	Epyx	Fantasy	APPII, TRS80, PET	Dungeon crawl	Sequel to Temple of Apshai	US
1980 (NA)	Odyssey: The Compleat Apventure	Synergistic Software	Synergistic Software	Fantasy	APPII		Combines Dungeon Campaign and Wilderness Campaign by the same author.	US
1980 (NA)	Dunjonquest: Morloc's Tower	Epyx	Epyx	Fantasy	ATR (Port)			US
1980 (NA)	Starquest: Rescue at Rigel	Epyx	Epyx	Sci-fi	APPII, TRS80		Spin-off of Dunjonquest series.	US
1980 (NA)	Starquest: Star Warrior	Epyx	Epyx	Sci-fi	TRS80		Spin-off of Dunjonquest series.	US
1980 (NA)	Temple of Apshai	Epyx	Epyx	Fantasy	APPII (Port)			US
1981 (NA)	Ali Baba and the Forty Thieves	Quality	Quality	Fantasy	ATR		Remake of Fracas	US
1981 (NA)	Dunjonquest: Datestones of Ryn	Epyx	Epyx	Fantasy	ATR (Port)			US
1981 (NA)	The Keys of Acheron	Epyx	Epyx	Fantasy	APPII, TRS80		Expansion of Temple of Apshai: Hellfire Warrior.	US
1981 (NA)	Dunjonquest: Morloc's Tower	Epyx	Epyx	Fantasy	ATR (Port)			US
1981 (NA)	Quest 1	Brian Reynolds	SoftSide	Fantasy	TRS80, APPII (Port), ATR (Port)	Dungeon crawl		US
1981 (NA)	Starquest: Rescue at Rigel	Epyx	Epyx	Sci-fi	ATR		Spin-off of Dunjonquest series.	US
1981 (NA)	Starquest: Star Warrior	Epyx	Epyx	Sci-fi	APPII, ATR		Spin-off of Dunjonquest series.	US
1981 (NA)	SwordThrust	Donald Brown	CE Software	Fantasy	APPII	Adventure-RPG	Enhanced remake of Eamon for Apple II.	US
1981 (NA)	Temple of Apshai	Epyx	Epyx	Fantasy	ATR (Port)		Series debuts.	US
1981 (NA)	Ultima	Richard Garriott	California Pacific	Fantasy	APPII		Series debuts. Re-released by Origin in 1986.	US
1981 (NA)	Upper Reaches of Apshai	Epyx	Epyx	Fantasy	APPII, TRS80		Expansion for Temple of Apshai.	US
1981 (NA)	Wizardry: Proving Grounds of the Mad Overlord	Sir-Tech	Sir-Tech	Fantasy	APPII	Dungeon crawl	Dungeon crawl in the style of the PLATO RPGs. Series debuts.	US
1982 (NA)	Advanced Dungeons & Dragons Cartridge (NA)	APh (NA)	Mattel (NA)	Fantasy	INT	Action-adventure game Dungeon crawl		US
1982 (NA)	Apventure to Atlantis	Synergistic Software	Synergistic Software	Fantasy	APPII		Sequel to Odyssey: The Compleat Apventure.	US
1982 (JP)	Ali Baba and the Forty Thieves	Quality	Quality	Fantasy	APPII (Port)			US
1982 (NA)	Curse of Ra	Epyx	Epyx	Fantasy	APPII, ATR, DOS, TRS80		Expansion of Temple of Apshai.	US
1983 (JP)	Danchizuma no Yuwaku (JP) 団地妻の誘惑 (JP)	Koei (JP)	Koei (JP)	Modern	PC88, FM7	Adventure RPG; Eroge		JP
1982 (NA)	Danger in Drindisti	Epyx	Epyx	Fantasy	APPII, ATR, TRS80		Expansion of Temple of Apshai: Hellfire Warrior.	US
1982 (NA)	Dragonstomper (NA)	Starpath (NA)	Starpath (NA)	Fantasy	ATR26	Pre-JRPG		US
1982 (NA)	Dungeons of Daggorath	DynaMicro (Douglas J. Morgan, Keith S. Kiyohara)	Tandy	Fantasy	TRSCC	Dungeon crawl Real-time, but text-driven		US
1982 (NA)	Dunzhin	Intelligent Statements	ScreenPlay; Computer Applications Unlimited; Med Systems Software	Fantasy	APPII, IBM, TRS80	Roguelike	Part 1 of Warriors of Ras	US
1982 (NA)	Hellfire Warrior	Epyx	Epyx	Fantasy	ATR (Port)		Sequel to Temple of Apshai.	US
1982 (NA)	Keys of Acheron, The	Epyx	Epyx	Fantasy	ATR (Port)		Expansion to Temple of Apshai: Hellfire Warrior.	US
1982 (NA)	Mazies & Crazies	TAB Books	TAB Books	Fantasy	TRS80		Example program in how-to programming book	US
1982 (NA)	Starquest: Rescue at Rigel	Epyx	Epyx	Sci-fi	VIC20 (Port)		Spin-off of Dunjonquest series.	US
1982 (NA)	Sword of Fargoal	Epyx	Epyx	Fantasy	VIC20	Roguelike		US
1982 (NA)	Telengard	Avalon Hill	Avalon Hill	Fantasy	APPII, ATR, PET, TRS80	Early roguelike relative	Based on DND.	US
1982 (NA)	Temple of Apshai	Epyx	Epyx	Fantasy	DOS (Port)			US
1982 (NA)	Tunnels of Doom	Kevin Kenney	Texas Instruments	Fantasy	TI99			US
1982 (NA)	Ultima II:The Revenge of the Enchantress	Richard Garriott	Sierra	Fantasy	APPII			US
1982 (NA)	Upper Reaches of Apshai	Epyx	Epyx	Fantasy	ATR (Port), DOS (Port)		Expansion of Temple of Apshai.	US
1982 (NA)	Wizardry II: The Knight of Diamonds	Sir-Tech	Sir-Tech	Fantasy	APPII			US
1983 (NA)	Advanced Dungeons & Dragons: Treasure of Tarmin (NA)	APh (NA)	Mattel (NA)	Fantasy	INT	Turn-based; Dungeon crawl		US
1983 (NA)	Amulet, The	Numenor Microsystems	Numenor Microsystems	Fantasy	DOS			CA
1983 (NA)	Beneath Apple Manor		Quality Software	Fantasy	DOS (Port), ATR (Port)	Roguelike	Graphical or textmode options.	US
1983 (JP)	Bokosuka Wars (JP) ボコスカウォーズ (JP)	Koji Sumii (JP)	ASCII (JP)	Fantasy	X1, MSX (Port), NES (Port)	Tactical RPG; RTS/RPG; Action RPG		JP
1983 (NA)	Expedition Amazon	Penguin Software	Penguin Software	Modern	APPII			US
1983 (NA)	Gateway to Apshai	Connelley Group	Epyx	Fantasy	ATR, C64			US
1983 (NA)	Morloc's Tower	Epyx	Epyx	Fantasy	IBM (Port)		Port of Dunjonquest: Morloc's Tower for TRS80.	US
1983 (JP)	Nobunaga's Ambition (JP) 信長の野望 (JP)	Koei (JP)	Koei (JP)	Historical	MSX, NES (Port)	Tactical RPG	Series debuts.	JP
1983 (NA)	Rescue at Rigel	Epyx	Epyx	Sci-fi	DOS (Port), IBM (Port)		Port of Rescue at Rigel for TRS80.	US
1983 (JP)	Return of Heracles	Quality (Stuart Smith)	Quality	Fantasy	ATR			US
1983 (NA)	Star Warrior	Epyx	Epyx	Sci-fi	DOS (Port)		Port of Star Warrior for TRS80.	US
1983 (NA)	Telengard	Avalon Hill; Kiya Overseas Industry Co., Ltd	Avalon Hill	Fantasy	C64 (Port), FM7 (Port)			US
1983 (NA)	Temple of Apshai	Epyx	Epyx	Fantasy	C64 (Port), VIC20 (Port)		Port of Temple of Apshai for TRS80.	US
1983 (NA)	Curse of Ra	Epyx	Epyx	Fantasy	C64 (Port)		Expansion of Temple of Apshai.	US
1983 (NA)	Ultima	Richard Garriott	Sierra	Fantasy	ATR (Port)			US
1983 (NA)	Ultima II:The Revenge of the Enchantress	Richard Garriott	Sierra	Fantasy	ATR (Port), C64 (Port), DOS (Port)			US
1983 (NA)	Ultima III: Exodus	Origin	Origin	Fantasy	APPII, ATR (Port), C64 (Port)		Pioneered many innovations that would become standard on many CRPGs that followed.	US
1983 (NA)	Ultima: Escape from Mount Drash	Keith Zabalaoui	Sierra	Fantasy	VIC20			US
1983 (NA)	Upper Reaches of Apshai	Epyx	Epyx	Fantasy	C64 (Port)		Expansion of Temple of Apshai.	US
1983 (EU)	Volcanic Dungeon	Carnell Software	Roy Carnell and Stuart A. Galloway	Fantasy	ZX, ZX81, DG32	Roguelike adventure-RPG	Sequel to Black Crystal.	UK
1983 (EU)	Wizardry: Proving Grounds of the Mad Overlord	Sir-Tech	Ediciel	Fantasy	APPII		French translation of Wizardry: Proving Grounds of the Mad Overlord.	US
1983 (NA)	Wizardry III: Legacy of Llylgamyn	Sir-Tech	Sir-Tech	Fantasy	APPII	Dungeon crawl		US
1984 (JP)	Age of Adventure	Quality	Quality	Fantasy	APPII (Comp), ATR (Comp), C64 (Comp)		Port and compilation of Return of Heracles and Ali Baba and the Forty Thieves for ATR.	US
1984 (JP)	Black Onyx, The (JP) ザ・ブラックオニキス (JP)	Bullet-Proof (JP)	Bullet-Proof (JP)	Fantasy	PC88	Dungeon crawl	Often considered the first Japanese RPG ever released	JP
1984 (JP)	The Black Onyx II: Search for the Fire Crystal (JP) ザ・ブラックオニキス (JP)	Bullet-Proof (JP)	Bullet-Proof (JP)	Fantasy	PC88	Dungeon crawl		JP
1984 (UK)	The Citadel of Chaos	Puffin Books	Puffin Books	Fantasy	C64, ZX		Adaptation of the Fighting Fantasy gamebook.	UK
1984 (JP/NA)	Dragon Buster (JP) ドラゴンバスター (JP)	Namco (JP)	Namco (JP)	Fantasy	Arcade, PC88, MSX, NES	Action RPG; Dungeon crawl	Series debuts.	JP
1984 (JP)	Dragon Slayer (JP) ドラゴンスレイヤー (JP)	Nihon Falcom (JP)	Nihon Falcom (JP)	Fantasy	PC88	Action RPG; JRPG	Series debuts.	JP
1984 (NA)	DND	R. O. Software	R. O. Software	Fantasy	DOS		Port of TOPS-10 version of DND by Daniel Lawrence.	US
1984 (NA)	Expedition Amazon	Penguin Software	Penguin Software (US); Starcraft Incorporated (J)	Modern	C64, FM7, PC88, PC98			US
1984 (EU)	The Forest of Doom	Puffin Books	Puffin Books	Fantasy	C64, ZX		Adaptation of the Fighting Fantasy Gamebook.	UK
1984 (NA)	Gateway to Apshai (NA)	The Connely Group (NA)	Epyx (NA)	Fantasy	CLV	Dungeon crawl		UK
1984 (JP)	Hydlide (JP) ハイドライド (JP)	T&E (JP)	T&E (JP)	Fantasy	PC88, PC98	Action RPG; JRPG	Series debuts.	JP
1984 (NA)	Lords of Midnight, The	Mike Singleton	Beyond Software; Amsoft	Fantasy	ZX, CPC	Adventure-RPG		UK
1984 (JP)	Mugen no Shinzō	Xtalsoft	Xtalsoft	Fantasy	PC88, PC98		Series debuts.	JP
1984 (JP)	Psychic City (JP) サイキックシティ (JP)	HOT·B	HOT·B	Post-apocalyptic	PC88, FM7			JP
1984 (NA)	Questron	SSI	SSI	Fantasy	APPII, ATR, C64		Series debuts.	US
1984 (NA)	Shadowkeep	Ultrasoft Inc.	Trillium Corp.	Fantasy	APPII		Adapted into a novel by Alan Dean Foster	US
1984 (NA/JP)	Telengard	Avalon Hill	Eclipse Software (NA); Kiya Overseas Industry, Ltd. (JP)	Fantasy	C64 (Port), PC88 (Port), PC98 (Port)			US
1984 (JP/NA)	Tower of Druaga, The (JP) ドルアーガの塔 (JP)	Namco	Namco	Fantasy	Arcade	Action RPG; JRPG	Series debuts.	JP
1984 (NA)	Wizardry: Proving Grounds of the Mad Overlord	Sir-Tech	Sir-Tech	Fantasy	IBM (Port)			US
1984 (EU)	Wrath of Magra, The	Mastervision	Carnell Software (Roy Carnell, Stephen Kirk, Stuart A. Galloway)	Fantasy	ZX		Sequel to Volcanic Dungeon.	UK
1984 (NA)	Xyphus	Penguin Software	Penguin Software	Fantasy	APPII, C64			US
1984 (NA)	Zyll	IBM	IBM	Fantasy	IBM		Text-based with randomized layout.	US
1985 (NA); 1984 (EU)	Stuart Smith's Adventure Construction Set		Ariolasoft UK; Electronic Arts	Fantasy; Sci-Fi	C64, APPII		RPG maker with sample games.	US
1984 (EU)	Dungeon of Doom	Usborne Publishing	Usborne Publishing	Fantasy			Example program in how-to programming book	UK
1985 (NA/UK)	Alternate Reality: The City	Paradise	Datasoft; U.S. Gold	Sci-Fi	ATR		Series debuts.	US
1985 (NA)	Autoduel	Origin Systems	Origin Systems	Post-apocalyptic	AMI, APPII, ATR, C64, DOS, MAC, ATRST		Based on Car Wars, by Steve Jackson Games.	US
1985 (NA)	Bards Tale, The	Interplay	EA	Fantasy	APPII, C64		The first CRPG to put Interplay on the map as a future CRPG developer.	US
1985 (JP/PAL)	Black Onyx, The (JP/PAL) ザ・ブラックオニキス (JP)	Bullet-Proof	Bullet-Proof; ASCII	Fantasy	FM7, MSX	Dungeon crawl		JP
1985 (JP)	Cosmic Soldier (JP) コズミックソルジャー (JP)	Kogado	Kogado; ASCII	Sci-Fi	MSX2, PC88	Dungeon crawl Eroge		JP
1985 (JP)	Courageous Perseus (JP) カレイジアスペルセウス (JP)	Cosmos computer	Cosmos computer	Fantasy	MSX	Action RPG		JP
1985 (NA)	Doomdark's Revenge	Mike Singleton	Beyond Software	Fantasy	ZX, CPC, C64	Adventure-RPG	Sequel to The Lords of Midnight	UK
1985 (JP)	Dragon Slayer (JP) ドラゴンスレイヤー (JP)	Nihon Falcom	Square	Fantasy	MSX	Action RPG		JP
1985 (JP)	Dragon Slayer II: Xanadu (JP) ザナドゥ (JP)	Nihon Falcom	Nihon Falcom	Fantasy	PC88, PC98	Action RPG		JP
1985 (JP)	Earth Fighter Rayieza, The (JP); Chikyū Senshi Raīza (JP) 地球戦士ライーザ (JP)	Enix	Enix	Sci-Fi	PC88, FM7, X1, MSX	Action RPG		JP
1985 (JP)	Fantasian (JP)	Xtalsoft	Xtalsoft	Fantasy	PC88, X1	Dungeon crawl		JP
1985 (JP)	Genesis: Beyond The Revelation (JP); Genesis (JP) ジェネシス (JP)	Square	Square	Post-apocalyptic	PC88			JP
1985 (JP)	Hydlide (JP) ハイドライド (JP)	T&E	T&E	Fantasy	MSX, MSX2	Action RPG		JP
1985 (JP)	Hydlide II: Shine of Darkness (JP) ハイドライド II (JP)	T&E	T&E	Fantasy	PC88	Action RPG		JP
1985 (EU)	Mandragore	Infogrames Entertainment	Infogrames Entertainment	Fantasy	APPII			FR
1985 (JP)	Moebius: The Orb of Celestial Harmony	Origin	Origin	Fantasy	APPII			US
1985 (JP)	Mugen no Shinzō II	Xtalsoft	Xtalsoft	Fantasy	PC88, PC98		Sequel to Mugen no Shinzō	JP
1985 (JP)	Outroyd (JP) アウトロイド (JP)	Stratford Computer Center	MagicalZoo	Sci-Fi	MSX			JP
1985 (NA)	Phantasie	SSI	SSI	Fantasy	APPII		Series debuts.	US
1985 (NA)	Phantasie	Logical Design	SSI	Fantasy	C64 (Port)		Port of Phantasie for APPII. Series debuts.	US
1985 (JP)	Rambo (JP) ランボー (JP)	Pack-In-Video	Pack-In-Video	Modern	MSX	Action RPG		JP
1985 (JP)	Screamer, The (JP)	Magical Zoo	Magical Zoo	Post-apocalyptic; Survival horror	PC88, PC98	Action RPG; Role-playing shooter		JP
1985 (NA)	Telengard	Avalon Hill	Avalon Hill	Fantasy	DOS (Port)			US
1985 (NA)	Temple of Apshai Trilogy	Epyx	Epyx	Fantasy	AMI (Comp), APPII (Comp), ATR (Comp), C64 (Comp), DOS (Comp)		Remake and compilation of the first three Temple of Apshai games.	US
1985 (JP)	Tower of Druaga, The (JP) ドルアーガの塔 (JP)	Namco	Namco	Fantasy	NES, MSX, X1	Action RPG; JRPG	Port of The Tower of Druaga for the Arcade.	JP
1985 (JP)	Tritorn	Sein-soft	Sein-soft	Fantasy	PC88, X1	Action RPG		JP
1985 (NA)	Ultima II:The Revenge of the Enchantress	Richard Garriott	Sierra	Fantasy	MAC (Port), ATRST (Port)			US
1985 (NA)	Ultima III: Exodus	Origin	Origin	Fantasy	DOS (Port)			US
1985 (NA)	Ultima IV: Quest of the Avatar	Origin	Origin	Fantasy	APPII, C64 (Port), DOS (Port)		The first major CRPG to move to a "virtuous" story-driven approach.	US
1985 (NA)	Wizard's Crown	SSI	SSI	Fantasy	DOS			US
1985 (NA)	Wizardry: Proving Grounds of the Mad Overlord	Sir-Tech	Sir-Tech	Fantasy	MAC (Port)			US
1985 (NA)	Xyphus	Penguin Software	Penguin Software	Fantasy	MAC (Port)		Top-down perspective.	US
