= Telengard =

1982 video game

- Developer: Daniel Lawrence
- Publisher: Avalon Hill
- Platforms: Apple II, TRS-80, Atari 8-bit, PET, VIC-20, Commodore 64, CP/M, IBM PC
- Release: 1982
- Genres: Dungeon crawl, role-playing
- Mode: Single-player

Telengard is a 1982 role-playing dungeon crawler video game developed by Daniel Lawrence and published by Avalon Hill. The player explores a dungeon, fights monsters with magic, and avoids traps in real-time without any set mission other than surviving. Lawrence first wrote the game as DND, a 1976 version of Dungeons & Dragons for the DECsystem-10 mainframe computer. He continued to develop DND at Purdue University as a hobby, rewrote the game for the PET 2001 after 1978, and ported it to Apple II+, TRS-80, and Atari 8-bit computers before Avalon Hill found the game at a convention and licensed it for distribution. Its Commodore 64 release was the most popular. Reviewers noted Telengard's similarity to Dungeons and Dragons. RPG historian Shannon Appelcline noted the game as one of the first professionally produced computer role-playing games, and Gamasutra's Barton considered Telengard consequential in what he deemed "The Silver Age" of computer role-playing games preceding the golden age of the late 1980s. Some of the game's dungeon features, such as altars, fountains, teleportation cubes, and thrones, were adopted by later games such as Tunnels of Doom (1982).

== Gameplay ==
A player navigates the dungeon in the IBM version.

In Telengard, the player travels alone through a dungeon fraught with monsters, traps, and treasures in a manner similar to the original Dungeons & Dragons. The game has 50 levels with two million rooms, 20 monster types, and 36 spells. (Note: The game's program allows an exception to go below level 50, with a gamer in 2021 reaching level 9,949 before being defeated by a level 27940 Ogre.) It has no missions or quests, and its only objective is to survive and improve the player character. The game is set in real-time and cannot be paused, so the player must visit an inn to save game progress. In the early releases such as Apple II, the game world has no sound and is represented by ASCII characters, such as slashes for stairs and dollar signs for treasure. Unless the player enters a special cheat code, progress is lost upon dying.

The single-player adventure begins by personalizing a player character. Each character has randomly generated values for their statistical character attributes: charisma, constitution, dexterity, intelligence, strength, and wisdom. (Note: Charisma changes how enemies respond to the player's presence. Constitution determines the degree of damage taken in battle. Dexterity is a measure of ability to evade when in battle. Intelligence affects magical spell ability. Strength affects combat ability. Wisdom lets the player use healing and undead spells.) The algorithm never changes, but the player can randomize repeatedly for new character attribute distributions until satisfied. The player begins with a sword, armor, shield, and no money, and can only see the immediate surroundings, rather than the whole level.

Monsters spawn randomly, and players have three options in battle: fight, use magic, or evade. Magic includes combative missiles, fireballs, lightning bolts, turning the undead, health regeneration, and trap navigation. The effects of the game's most complex spells are not outlined in the instruction manual and must be learned by trial and error. Like the game, the battle events are carried out in real-time instead of in turns. Enemies increase in difficulty as the player progresses through the dungeon. They include both living and undead monsters such as elves, dragons, mummies, and wraiths. Defeating enemies awards experience points, which accrete to raise the player's experience level and increase player stats. The player is rewarded with treasures that include magical weapons, armor items, and potions. Players can code their own features into the game.

== Development ==
While a computer science student at Purdue University, Daniel Lawrence wrote several games for the university's PDP-11 RSTS/E mainframe computer, and one grew into Telengard. In his 1976/77 college summer breaks at home, he worked at BOCES in Spencerport, New York, where he wrote a dungeon crawl game called DND in the BASIC programming language for the DECsystem-10's TOPS-10 operating system. He had been influenced by the pen and paper role-playing game Dungeons & Dragons. At college, he ported the game to Purdue's PDP-11 RSTS/E. (Note: He was later asked by Digital Equipment Corporation to port DND to DECsystem-20.) The game's mechanics grew from conversations at the Purdue engineering building. Part of its real-time nature descended from the need to not have players monopolize the few shared computer terminals.

In 1978, Lawrence purchased the PET 2001 and no longer needed the university's computer, though the microcomputer's lack of memory was his primary design obstacle. He rewrote DND as Telengard within eight kilobytes of memory and designed the dungeon to be procedurally generated based on the player-character's position so the maps would not have to be stored in memory. The final version almost completely used 32 kilobytes of memory. It was easily ported to the Apple II+ and TRS-80 platforms due to their similar usage of the 8K BASIC programming language. The port to Atari 8-bit computers required more complicated handling of string variables. Movement is not by WASD keys (S is stay and X is south), perhaps the first video game to use them.

The three ports were finished before Avalon Hill saw the game at a gaming convention and licensed it in 1982 as one of its first computer games. The IBM PC port required a rewrite into the C programming language; the source code for this version was later lost. The Heath/Zenith CP/M version requires MBASIC. The VIC-20 version requires 24K memory expansion. The Commodore 64 port was the most popular.

Matt Barton of Gamasutra reported that Lawrence's DND (and consequently, his Telengard) was directly inspired by Whisenhunt and Wood's dnd for PLATO, with its randomized dungeons and minimalist graphics, though Lawrence recalled in an interview that he had not seen or known of their game. Computer Gaming World's Scorpia wrote that Telengard was based on the earlier, public domain software Castle Telengard.

The game's BASIC source code was available, so ports and remasters were made by the fan community.

== Reception and legacy ==
Norman Banduch provided an early review for Telengard in the December 1982 issue of The Space Gamer, saying that "Telengard could have been a good game, but is marred by poor programming and lack of polish. If you don't want to rewrite it yourself, wait for the second edition".

Troy Christensen reviewed Telengard for Different Worlds magazine and stated that "Telengard is one of the finest computer games around today, it is inexpensive, full of excitement and it has the ability to intrigue both the inexperienced and experienced alike. Telengard reminds me of a mixture of adventure games like Dungeons & Dragons, RuneQuest, and the boardgame Dungeon. I would strongly recommend this game to anyone who has a Commodore 64 and who enjoys adventure gaming. I don't think anyone will find this game disappointing or boring."

RPG historian Shannon Appelcline identifies Telengard as one of the first professionally produced computer role-playing games. Gamasutra's Barton described the game as a "pure dungeon crawler" for its lack of diversions, and noted its expansive dungeons as a "key selling point". AllGame's Earl Green remarked that the game's mechanics were very similar in practice to Dungeons & Dragons, The Commodore 64 Home Companion described it to have Dungeons-and-Dragons style, Computer Gaming World's Dick McGrath also said the game "borrowed heavily" from the original such that he expected its creators to be thanked in the end credits, and Scorpia cited four specific similarities with Dungeons & Dragons.

Green described the game as "exceedingly simple ... yet very addictive" and rated it four of five stars. McGrath wrote that he wanted to have more control over his money, and added that a store for purchasing upgrades would have been useful. He thought that games such as Dunjonquest and Maces and Magic handled this aspect better. McGrath suggested that the player draw their own map in the absence of an overview mapping system. He said that his appreciation for the game grew with time and that it had the necessary hook to make him continually return and play again. Tony Roberts of Compute! considered the Commodore 64 version of the game best for its enhanced graphics. The Commodore 64 Home Companion agreed, stating that it "has some fine sprite graphics and sound effects not found in other versions of the game". Scorpia in 1993 stated that while Telengard was "interesting for its time, the game would be pretty dated today" compared to the Gold Box games; "back then, however, it was hot stuff, and a fun way of passing the time".

Barton of Gamasutra placed Telengard alongside Wizardry and the early Ultima series in what he deemed "The Silver Age" of computer role-playing games that preceded the golden age of the late 1980s. Yet in 1992, Computer Gaming World's Gerald Graef wrote that Telengard and Temple of Apshai were "quickly overshadowed" by the Wizardry and Ultima series. (Note: Computer Gaming World's Roy Wagner wrote that Telengard and Temple of Apshai were "very similar".) Some of the game's dungeon features, such as altars, fountains, teleportation cubes, and thrones, were adopted by later games such as Tunnels of Doom (1982), and Sword of Fargoal (1982) has similar features. Barton wrote in 2007 that Telengard "still enjoys considerable appreciation today" and questioned whether the Diablo series was "but an updated Telengard".
