= Rescue at Rigel =

1980 video game

- Developer: Automated Simulations
- Publisher: Automated Simulations
- Designer: Jon Freeman
- Engine: Temple of Apshai
- Platforms: Apple II, Atari 8-bit, IBM PC, PET, TRS-80, VIC-20
- Release: 1980
- Genre: Role-playing
- Mode: Single-player

Rescue at Rigel is a science fiction role-playing video game developed by Automated Simulations (later known as Epyx) and published in 1980. It is based on a modified version of their Temple of Apshai game engine, which was used for most of their releases in this era. The game was released for the Apple II, IBM PC (as a self-booting disk), TRS-80, Commodore PET, VIC-20, and Atari 8-bit computers.

The player moves through a space fortress in search of ten hostages. Presented in a top-down view, the player can only see the area immediately around them, so the entire base has to be searched room by room. There is a 60-minute time limit on the mission.

Rescue at Rigel was followed by Star Warrior, and the two games were rebranded to be part of the Starquest series.

== Gameplay ==
Atari 8-bit computer version

Players take on the role of adventurer Sudden Smith. Smith must try to rescue captives from the interior of an asteroid orbiting the star Rigel. Players have 60 minutes to rescue 10 human captives from the alien moon base. They must first find the captives before delivering them to the rescue ship (via a transport beam).

Players must defeat or avoid the enemies wandering the base: the alien Tollahs, two types of armed robots, a six-legged "cerbanth", venomous flying "thornets", and a huge amoebic slug. As players forge deeper into the alien stronghold, they have the opportunity to acquire better weapons.

The playfield is presented as a top-down view of the current location of the hero. The game is turn-based, with the player given a certain number of "points" to spend on various actions, completing their turn when the points ran out. Rescue at Rigel is very similar to Temple of Apshai, a popular dungeon crawl by Epyx, part of their "Dunjonquest" series. Rescue at Rigel had a timer similar to The Datestones of Ryn, an earlier Dunjonquest game.

Rescue at Rigel used the concept of providing room descriptions similar to those used in some Dunjonquest games, but instead of unique descriptions for numbered rooms, the game had multiple rooms labeled "Sanctum", for example, and a detailed description of what typical Sanctums contained was provided in the manual along with about a dozen other room types.

== Reception ==
Bruce F. Webster reviewed Rescue at Rigel in The Space Gamer No. 34. Webster commented that "if you've got the money and the interest, buy it. In fact, if you've only got either the money or the interest, buy it - you'll be glad you did."

Jerry Pournelle reported in BYTE in 1983 that Rescue at Rigel was one of several Epyx games his sons enjoyed playing.
