= List of Eamon adventures =

At least 280 Eamon adventures have been released since the debut of Eamon circa 1980.

== Adventures ==
The following list of officially recognized and publicly-available Eamon adventures is drawn principally from the Eamon Wiki. The EDX column indicates the number assigned by Eamon Deluxe. Release dates generally indicate when the adventure was first announced as being publicly available.

Number	EDX#	Title	Author(s)	Released
1	01-01	The Beginners Cave	Donald Brown	c. late 1979
2	02-01	The Lair of the Minotaur	Donald Brown	c. late 1979
3	03-01	The Cave of the Mind	Jim Jacobson, Red Varnum	1980
4	03-02	The Zyphur Riverventure	Jim Jacobson	1980
5	02-02	Castle of Doom	Donald Brown	1980
6	02-03	The Death Star	Donald Brown	1980
7	03-03	The Devil's Tomb	Jim Jacobson	1980
8	03-04	The Abductor's Quarters	Jim Jacobson	1980
9	02-04	Assault on the Clone Master	Donald Brown	1980
10	13-01	The Magic Kingdom	David Cook	1980
11	02-05	The Tomb of Molinar	Donald Brown	1980
12	03-05	The Quest for Trezore	Jim Jacobson	1980
13	13-02	The Caves of Treasure Island	Paul Braun, Geoffrey Genz	c. 1981
14	13-03	Furioso	William Davis	c. 1981
15	04-01	Heroes Castle	John Nelson	c. 1981
16	04-02	The Caves of Mondamen	John Nelson	c. 1981
17	13-04	Merlin's Castle	Randall Hersom	c. 1981
18	13-05	Hogarth Castle	Ken Nestle	c. 1981
19	04-03	Death Trap	John Nelson	c. 1981
20	04-04	The Black Death	John Nelson	c. 1981
21	04-05	The Quest for Marron	John Nelson	c. 1981
22	13-06	The Senator's Chambers	James Plamondon	c. 1982
23	12-01	The Temple of Ngurct	James Plamondon, Robert Plamondon	c. 1982
24	04-06	Black Mountain	John Nelson	c. 1982
25	04-07	Nuclear Nightmare	John Nelson	c. 1982
26	04-08	Assault on the Mole Man	John Nelson	c. 1982
27	04-09	Revenge of the Mole Man	John Nelson	c. 1982
28	13-07	The Tower of London	Fred Smith, Sandy Smith	c. 1982
29	02-06	The Lost Island of Apple	Donald Brown	c. 1982
30	19-01	The Underground City	Steve Adelson	c. 1982
31	04-10	The Gauntlet	John Nelson	c. 1983
32	19-02	House of Ill Repute	Anonymous	c. 1983
33	04-11	The Orb of Polaris	John Nelson	c. 1983
34	13-08	Death's Gateway	Bob Linden	c. 1983
35	13-09	The Lair of Mutants	Evan Hodson	c. 1983
36	13-10	The Citadel of Blood	Evan Hodson	c. 1983
37	12-02	The Quest for the Holy Grail	Evan Hodson	c. 1983
38	12-03	The City in the Clouds	Evan Hodson	March 1984
39	13-11	Museum of Unnatural History	Rick Volberding	March 1984
40	13-12	Daemon's Playground	Rick Volberding	March 1984
41	13-13	Caverns of Lanst	Rick Volberding	March 1984
42	01-02	Alternate Beginners Cave	Rick Volberding	March 1984
43	13-14	Priests of Xim!	Marty Bauman, Ed Bauman	March 1984
44	13-15	Escape from the Orc Lair	Jay Hinkelman	March 1984
45	10-01	SwordQuest	Roger Pender	March 1984
46	19-03	Lifequest	David Crawford	March 1984
47	10-02	FutureQuest	Roger Pender	March 1984
48	04-12	Picnic in Paradise	John Nelson	March 1984
49	12-04	The Castle Kophinos	Don Doumakes	May 1984
50	13-16	Behind the Sealed Door	Tim Berge	May 1984
51	13-17	The Caves of Eamon Bluff	Tim Berge	May 1984
52	14-01	The Devil's Dungeon	Jeanette Merrill	May 1984
53	14-02	Feast of Carroll	Dan Lilienkamp, Jon Lilienkamp	May 1984
54	14-03	Crystal Mountain	Ken Hoffman	May 1984
55	14-04	The Master's Dungeon	Jeff Allen	May 1984
56	14-05	The Lost Adventure	Jeff Allen	May 1984
57	14-06	The Manxome Foe	Ray Olszewski	May 1984
58	13-18	The Land of Death	Tim Berge	May 1984
59	19-04	The Jungles of Vietnam	Jeff Allen	May 1984
60	14-07	The Sewers of Chicago	Jeff Allen	May 1984
61	14-08	The Harpy Cloud	Allan Porter	May 1984
62	14-09	The Caverns of Doom	Matthew Mullin	May 1984
63	19-05	Valkenburg Castle	Jeff Weener	May 1984
64	14-10	Modern Problems	Bonnie Anderson, Tony Barban, Jay Thompson	May 1984
65	14-11	The School of Death	Kurt Townsend	May 1984
66	14-12	Dungeons of Xenon	Sam Bhayani	May 1984
67	14-13	Chaosium Caves	Sam Bhayani	May 1984
68	14-14	The Smith's Stronghold	Allan Porter	May 1984
69	12-05	The Black Castle of NaGog	Doug Burrows	August 1984
70	14-15	The Tomb of Y'Golonac	Robert Romanchuk	August 1984
71	19-06	Operation Crab Key	Joe Vercellone	August 1984
72	13-19	House on Eamon Ridge	Tim Berge	August 1984
73	12-06	The Deep Canyon	Kenn Blincoe	August 1984
74	10-03	DharmaQuest	Roger Pender	August 1984
75	12-07	Temple of the Guild	Don Doumakes	August 1984
76	12-08	The Search for Yourself	Don Doumakes	August 1984
77	04-13	Temple of the Trolls	John Nelson	October 1984
78	12-09	The Prince's Tavern	Bob Davis	October 1984
79	02-07	The Castle of Count Fuey	Donald Brown	January 1985
80	02-08	The Search for the Key	Donald Brown	January 1985
81	02-09	The Rescue Mission	Donald Brown	January 1985
82	14-16	Escape from Mansi Island	Scott Starkey	January 1985
83	14-17	The Twin Castles	Jim Tankard	January 1985
84	14-18	Castle of Riveneta	Robert Karsten	January 1985
85	14-19	The Time Portal	Ed Kuypers	January 1985
86	15-01	Castle Mantru	Steve Costanzo	January 1985
87	04-14	Caves of Hollow Mountain	John Nelson	January 1985
88	19-07	The Shopping Mall	Allan Porter	January 1985
89	14-20	Superfortress of Lin Wang	Sam Bhayani	January 1985
90	14-21	The Doomsday Clock	Jim Tankard	January 1985
91	10-04	FutureQuest II	Roger Pender	January 1985
92	12-10	The Fugitive	Don Doumakes	March 1985
93	15-02	Flying Circus	Rick Krebs	May 1985
94	15-03	Blood Feud	Rick Krebs	May 1985
95	15-04	The Maze of Quasequeton	Brian Kondalski	May 1985
96	19-08	The Chamber of the Dragons	Brian Kondalski	May 1985
97	15-05	The House of Secrets	George Gunn	May 1985
98	15-06	Slave Pits of Kzorland	Rick Hersam	May 1985
99	04-15	In the Clutches of Torrik	John Nelson	May 1985
100	04-16	Sorceror's Spire	John Nelson	May 1985
101	19-09	Ground Zero	Sam	August 1985
102	19-10	The Eamon Railroad	Sam	August 1985
103	19-11	Top Secret	Sam	August 1985
104	19-12	The Lost World	Sam	August 1985
105	19-13	The Strange Resort	Sam	August 1985
106	12-11	Camp Eamon	Bob Slemon	August 1985
107	10-05	The Last Dragon	Roger Pender	August 1985
108	09-01	The Mines of Moria	Sam Ruby	August 1985
109	09-02	The Forest of Fear	Sam Ruby	August 1985
110	15-07	Fire Island	Greg Gioia	October 1985
111	15-08	A Vacation in Europe	David Smith	October 1985
112	15-09	Hills of History	David Smith	October 1985
113	13-20	The Life-Orb of Mevtrelek	Rick Volberding	October 1985
114	05-01	Thror's Ring	Tom Zuchowski	October 1985
115	09-03	The Ring of Doom	Sam Ruby	June 1986
116	09-04	The Iron Prison	Sam Ruby	June 1986
117	12-12	Dungeon of Doom	Dan Knezek	June 1986
118	12-13	Pittfall	Scott Starkey	June 1986
119	06-01	Grunewalde	Pat Hurst	June 1986
120	04-17	Orb of My Life	John Nelson	June 1986
121	12-14	Wrenhold's Secret Vigil	Bob Davis	June 1986
122	09-05	The Valley of Death	Sam Ruby	January 1987
123	15-10	The Wizard of the Spheres	Marc Elkin	January 1987
124	05-02	Assault on Dolni Keep	Tom Zuchowski	January 1987
125	19-14	The Mattimoe Palace	Jeff Actor	January 1987
126	06-02	The Pyramid of Anharos	Pat Hurst	January 1987
127	09-06	The Hunt for the Ring	Sam Ruby	January 1987
128	09-07	Quest of Erebor	Sam Ruby	January 1987
129	09-08	Return to Moria	Sam Ruby	January 1987
130	09-09	Haradwaith	Sam Ruby	January 1987
131	15-11	Nucleus of the Ruby	Keith Somers	January 1987
132	10-06	Rhadshur Warrior	Roger Pender	January 1987
133	15-12	The Final Frontier	Bob Slemon	January 1987
134	15-13	Pyramid of the Ancients	Joe Pirone, Robert Pirone	January 1987
135	19-15	The Tomb of Evron	Mike Greifenkamp	January 1987
136	19-16	The Mountain Fortress	Mike Greifenkamp	January 1987
137	15-14	The Ruins of Ivory Castle	Mike Greifenkamp	January 1987
138	15-15	Starfire	Ed Phillips	January 1987
139	12-15	Peg's Place	Margaret Anderson, Anne Anderson	January 1987
140	01-03	Beginner's Forest	Margaret Anderson	January 1987
141	15-16	The Infested Fortress	Mike Hamaoka, Paul Hamaoka	January 1987
142	16-01	The Beermeister's Brewery	Jeff Actor	January 1987
143	16-02	The Alternate Zone	Jeff Actor	January 1987
144	15-17	Gartin Manor	Greg Gioia	January 1987
145	06-03	Buccaneer!	Pat Hurst	October 1987
146	16-03	The House of Horrors	Dan Cross	October 1987
147	06-04	The Dark Brotherhood	Pat Hurst	October 1987
148	05-03	Journey to Jotunheim	Tom Zuchowski	October 1987
149	09-10	Elemental Apocalypse	Sam Ruby	October 1987
150	05-04	Walled City of Darkness	Tom Zuchowski	June 1988
151	16-04	Eamon S.A.R.-1: The Deneb Raid	David Crawford	June 1988
152	08-01	The Computer Club of Fear	Nathan Segerlind	June 1988
153	08-02	Lost!	Nathan Segerlind	June 1988
154	16-05	A Trip to Fort Scott	William Trent	June 1988
155	16-06	Tomb of the Vampire	Matthew Grayson, William Trent	June 1988
156	08-03	The Lake	Nathan Segerlind	September 1988
157	08-04	The Pathetic Hideout of Mr. R.	Nathan Segerlind	September 1988
158	08-05	The Lair of Mr. Ed	Nathan Segerlind	September 1988
159	08-06	The Bridge of Catzad-Dum	Nathan Segerlind	September 1988
160	08-07	Monty Python and the Holy Grail	Nathan Segerlind	September 1988
161	09-11	Operation Endgame	Sam Ruby	September 1988
162	05-05	Eamon v7.0 Demo Adventure	Tom Zuchowski	December 1988
163	16-07	The Sands of Mars	Ted Swartz	December 1988
164	16-08	A Real Cliffhanger	Ted Swartz	December 1988
165	09-12	Animal Farm	Sam Ruby	December 1988
166	09-13	Storm Breaker	Sam Ruby	March 1989
167	15-18	Expedition to the Darkwoods	Greg Gioia	June 1989
168	16-09	The High School of Horrors	Michael Haney, Aaron Hunt	June 1989
169	10-07	The Black Phoenix	Roger Pender	June 1989
170	08-08	Ragnarok Revisited	Nathan Segerlind	June 1989
171	11-01	The Pyramid of Cheops	Robert Parker	June 1989
172	16-10	The Mountain of the Master	Michael Dalton	June 1989
173	11-02	The House That Jack Built	Robert Parker	June 1989
174	11-03	Escape from Granite Hall	Robert Parker	June 1989
175	11-04	Anatomy of the Body	Robert Parker	June 1989
176	11-05	Dirtie Trix's Mad Maze	Robert Parker	June 1989
177	11-06	Shippe of Fooles	Robert Parker	June 1989
178	11-07	The Alien Intruder	Robert Parker	June 1989
179	11-08	The Wizard's Tower	Robert Parker	September 1989
180	11-09	Gamma 1	Robert Parker	September 1989
181	11-10	The Eamon Sewer System	Robert Parker	September 1989
182	11-11	Farmer Brown's Woods	Robert Parker	September 1989
183	09-14	The Boy and the Bard	Sam Ruby	September 1989
184	16-11	Quest for Orion	Pat Gise	December 1989
185	11-12	The Body Revisited	Robert Parker	December 1989
186	01-04	Beginner's Cave II	John Nelson	December 1989
187	19-17	Batman!!	Andrew Geha	December 1989
188	11-13	Encounter: The Bookworm	Robert Parker	March 1990
189	19-18	The Ruins of Belfast	David Sparks	March 1990
190	16-12	Shift Change at Grimmwax	David Sparks, Andrea Sparks	March 1990
191	01-05	Enhanced Beginners Cave	Donald Brown, John Nelson	March 1990
192	16-13	Mean Streets	Thomas Tetirick	March 1990
193	11-14	The Creature of Rhyl	Robert Parker	March 1990
194	08-09	Attack of the Kretons	Nathan Segerlind	March 1990
195	01-06	The Training Ground	Charles Hewgley	March 1990
196	11-15	The Cat House	Anonymous	June 1990
197	19-19	Star Wars – Tempest One	Sean Averill	June 1990
198	11-16	Revenge of the Bookworm	Robert Parker	June 1990
199	16-14	Quest of the Crystal Wand	Robert Davis	June 1990
200	16-15	The Lost Isle	Robert Davis	June 1990
201	16-16	The Caverns of Vanavara	Charles Hewgley	June 1990
202	16-17	The Plain of Srevi	Karl Ivers	September 1990
203	16-18	Lotto's Masterpiece	Henry Haskell	September 1990
204	09-15	Sanctuary	Sam Ruby	September 1990
205	16-19	Utterly Outrageous	Pat Gise	March 1991
206	04-18	Curse of the Hellsblade	John Nelson, Tom Zuchowski	March 1991
207	17-01	Eamon Renegade Club	Phil Schulz	September 1991
208	17-02	Assault on Helstar	Phil Schulz	December 1991
209	17-03	Apocalypse 2021	Hoyle Purvis	December 1991
210	17-04	Return of Ngurct	Hoyle Purvis	December 1991
211	17-05	Lair of the Marauders	Hoyle Purvis	December 1991
212	17-06	Haunted Keep	Hoyle Purvis	December 1991
213	17-07	Demongate	Hoyle Purvis	December 1991
214	17-08	Deathstalker's Castle	Phil Schulz	March 1992
215	15-19	Treasure Island	Margaret Anderson	March 1992
216	15-20	The Pirate's Cave	Margaret Anderson	March 1992
217	17-09	Eye of Agamon	Hoyle Purvis	June 1992
218	17-10	Return to Pendrama	Hoyle Purvis	September 1992
219	17-11	The City of Sorcerers	Rodger Osgood	September 1992
220	17-12	Catacombs of Terror	Phil Schulz	December 1992
221	11-17	Count Dracula's Castle	Robert Parker	March 1993
222	13-21	The Halls of the Adept	Tim Berge, Johnathan Cottingham	March 1993
223	17-13	Time-Shift	Corey Sena	June 1993
224	17-14	Prisoner of Darkness	Phil Schulz	March 1994
225	07-01	Adventure in Interzone	Frank Black	June 1994
226	11-18	Bookworm 3-D	Robert Parker	September 1994
227	19-20	B I Z A R R O	Allan Porter	September 1994
228	17-15	Shipwreck Island	Ron Ledbetter	September 1994
229	17-16	Firestorm	Phil Schulz	March 1995
230	17-17	Well of the Great Ones	Mike Ellis	March 1995
231	17-18	Keep of Skull Gorge	Don Kellogg	March 1995
232	17-19	Jewel of Yara	Hoyle Purvis	September 1995
233	17-20	The Domain of Zenoqq	Robert Claney	September 1995
234	11-19	The Forbidden City	Robert Parker	September 1995
235	16-20	Vaalpa's Plight	Henry Haskell	December 1995
236	18-01	Search for Mack	Clayton Roth	December 1995
237	07-02	Fiends of Eamon	Frank Black	March 1996
238	19-21	Sagamore	Joey Czarnik	September 1996
239	18-02	Idol of the Incas	Clyde Easterday	March 1997
240	07-03	The Heart of Gold	Frank Black	June 1997
241	18-03	The Shrunken Adventurer	Adam Myrow	December 1997
242	18-04	The Dungeon of Traps	Boris Guenter	December 1997
243	18-05	The Dragon of Aldaar	Glenn Gribble	December 2000
244	18-06	The Caverns of the Sphinx	Geoffrey Genz	June 2003
245	18-07	Dracula's Chateau	Paul Braun	June 2003
246	18-08	The Sword of Inari	Matthew Clark	June 2003
247	04-19	Amateur Alley	John Nelson	February 2004
248	04-20	Quest for the Fire Dragon	John Nelson, Frank Black	February 2004
249	18-09	The Hindenburg Ogre	David Owens	March 2004
250	18-10	The Tomb of Razaak	David Owens	January 2005
251	18-11	The Pixy Oak	Bruce Haylock	May 2005
252	18-12	Cliffs of Fire	Wade Clarke	March 2009
253	18-13	The Prism of Shadows	Wade Clarke, James Anderson	March 2009
254	18-14	Dawn of the Warlock	Wade Clarke	March 2009
255	23-05	Tenement of the Damned (Le HLM Maudit)	J. M. Menassanch	December 1985
256	09-16	Redemption	Sam Ruby	May 1993
257	09-17	Banana Republic	Sam Ruby	mid/late 1994
258	09-18	The Curse of Talon	Sam Ruby	mid-1995
259	07-04	Edgar's Adventures	Frank Black	c. 1996
260	05-06	Hammer's Slammers	Tom Zuchowski	January 2004
261		The Haunted House	Paul Van Bloem	1985
262	23-07	The Sub-Aquan Laboratory	Michael Penner	1987
263	23-08	The Crypt Crasher & the Tomb of Horrors, The Vile Grimoire of Jaldi'al	Michael Penner	1988, 2020
264	23-01	The Ice Cave	Jon Walker	January 1987
265	23-02	Cronum's Castle	Matt Ashcraft, Richard Tonsing	1987
266	23-03	Lord of the Underland	Justin Langseth	1987
267	23-09	Leadlight	Wade Clarke	2010
268	01-07	Eamon Deluxe Demo Adventure	Frank Black	c. 2012
269	20-01	Journey Across the Muerte Sea	John MacArthur	March 2005
270	21-01	Realm of Fantasy	Jared Davis	November 2006
271	22-01	A Runcible Cargo	Thomas Ferguson	March 2012
272	23-04	The Adventurer's General Store	Ryan Page	2012
273	24-01	Stronghold of Kahr-Dur	Derek Jeter	March 2013
274	25-01	The Treachery of Zorag	Derek Jeter	May 2013
275		Assault on the Clone Master	Keith Dechant	August 2017
276		Land of the Mountain King	Kenneth Pedersen	February 2020
277		Malleus Maleficarum	Keith Dechant	April 2020
278		Escape from Mt. Moon	Logan Blizzard	November 2021
279		The Tower of Eamon	Frank Black, Thomas Ferguson, Huw Williams	July 2022
280		The Wayfarers Inn	Michael Penner	October 2023
