= Temple of Apshai Trilogy =

1985 video game collection

- Cover artwork by Ken Macklin
- Publisher: Epyx
- Series: Dunjonquest
- Platforms: Amiga, Amstrad CPC, Apple II, Atari ST, Atari 8-bit, Commodore 64, MS-DOS, Mac, Thomson MO5/MO6, Thomson TO7/TO9
- Release: 1985
- Genre: Adventure

Temple of Apshai Trilogy is a remake of three games from the Dunjonquest series, Temple of Apshai, Upper Reaches of Apshai, and Curse of Ra.

== Development ==
In 1985, Epyx published a remake of Temple of Apshai, featuring new graphics and music, and bundled with both Upper Reaches of Apshai and Curse of Ra on a single disk into the Temple of Apshai Trilogy. The game was redesigned by Stephen Landrum. The trilogy was ported to 16-bit computers by Westwood Studios. These versions feature mouse controls and room descriptions within the game instead of the manual.

== Release ==
In 1985, Epyx published the remake Temple of Apshai Trilogy for Commodore 64, Atari 8-bit computers, Apple II, Thomson MO, TO computers, and IBM PC listed at a price of $29.95. It was released for the Commodore 64 and Atari 8-bit computers in October 1985, and for the Apple II in November 1985.

The title contains an improved version of the original with Upper Reaches of Apshai and Curse of Ra on a single disk, featuring 12 dungeon levels and 568 rooms total. It was created by Stephen Landrum.

A Mac version of Temple of Apshai Trilogy was also advertised a month later. In the following year, it appeared on Amiga and Atari ST. The Amiga, Atari ST and Macintosh versions were ported by Westwood Studios. Company co-founder Louis Castle stated in an interview with Computer & Video Games that his studio wanted to change the gameplay to real-time, but this was rejected by the publisher. The 16-bit versions introduced a new mouse-controlled interface where commands are selected from pull-down menus, but could also be controlled with the keyboard. The room descriptions are contained in the program here, and can also be accessed through a menu.

In 1987, Temple of Apshai Trilogy was adapted to the Amstrad CPC and Thomson TO by d3M Software and published in France with the title La Trilogie Du Temple D'Apshai.

== Reception ==
Gregg Pearlman for Antic said "The Temple of Apshai Trilogy is essentially an enjoyable game, among the most popular of its genre. Many of the elements are interesting and imaginative."

Ervin Bobo for Commodore Power/Play said "good games never die. They either become classics as they are, or are improved upon at a later date. The Temple of Apshai Trilogy proves they can do both."

Patrick J. Kelley for ANALOG Computing said "So, if you're the armchair-barbarian type, come on in. You have nothing to lose but . . ."

Compute!'s Gazette in 1986 called Temple of Apshai Trilogy for the Commodore 64 "a classic series of computer games made even better", stating that improved graphics and game play made it worthwhile even for those who had played them before. Amiga World criticized the Amiga version of Trilogy's repetitiveness, stating that "unless you are very easily amused you will probably lose interest fairly soon". Bill Kunkel, Arnie Katz and Joyce Worley for ANALOG Computing, on the other hand, listed Trilogy as one of the best Atari ST games of 1986, lauded the improved graphics and interface, while asserting that "the actual content is timeless". In Dragon #114's "The Role of Computers" column in 1986, reviewers Hartley and Pattie Lesser also stated that the game was "well-worth your interest." Info gave the Amiga version four-plus stars out of five, stating that the trilogy "has been admirably Amiga-tized". The magazine approved of the graphics, sound, and user interface and concluded that the game would be "more likely to appeal to novices than Ultima".

Roy Wagner reviewed the game for Computer Gaming World, and stated that " For simple exploring adventure and mapping this fills the need. It is a good introduction for beginning or younger players. There are no puzzles to solve."

Lee Hutchinson writing for Ars Technica recalled of the Trilogy set that "It seems like rather a thin experience, but I spent hours wandering through the three Temple adventures as a ludicrously overpowered adventurer. I certainly missed the main point of the game, but it was undeniably fun to wander around and bash monsters."
