= Black Crystal =

1982 video game

- Publisher: Carnell Software
- Designers: Roy Carnell; Stuart A. Galloway
- Programmer: Roy Carnell
- Platforms: ZX81, ZX Spectrum, Commodore 64, TI-99/4A
- Release: 1982
- Genre: Action-adventure game

Black Crystal is an action-adventure game released in 1982 for the ZX81, ZX Spectrum, Commodore 64 and TI-99/4A computers by Carnell Software Ltd. It was the first in the "Third Continent Trilogy" of adventure games; followed by Volcanic Dungeon and The Wrath of Magra.

The game featured an epic story spanning many locations; Kingdom of Beroth, Castle of Shadows, The Shaggoth's Lair, The Temple of the Fire Demon, The Tower of Beroth, The Sea of Sand, The Underground Swamp, Gold Mine, Bridge Over Abyss, Temple Maze, Room of Pits, Lords of Chaos and finally The Black Crystal.

To load all of these locations on such early computers, the program employed a multi-load mechanism.

== Plot ==
The player takes the role of an adventurer who must traverse the fantasy Kingdom of Beroth to defeat Tobias. Tobias has summoned a Black Crystal and this can only be destroyed by visiting six maps and retrieving seven rings of power. Once collected, the player must defeat Tobias in a final showdown.

== Gameplay ==
The game was primarily a text-adventure with a graphical map.

Completing a map allows the player to advance, while failure means a restart of the current map. Each map is loaded in sequence from the tape and as such makes this ZX81 title feel unique.

The player would have to enter commands to complete parts of the map, with different sections having different controls.

As the game-world was very big, the player could save and load progress, and could revisit locations by entering co-ordinates. The player would rely on a mix of Purity, Physical Strength and Spiritual Strength to succeed the many tasks needed to reach the Black Crystal.

== Reception ==
Due in-part to its innovative multi-load approach, the game has been frequently cited as one of the best ZX81 adventure games.

"There are only two graphics adventures which stand out in the market at the moment. The first to be produced was Black Crystal from Carnell Software..."

"Black Crystal is the most ambitious adventure game I've seen for the ZX81, with elements of Lord Of The Rings grafted on to the adventure format. ...The program is large and is divided into six segments preceded by a short load test...it takes some time to master the use of keys controlling movement and weapons, and to discover the right tactics for various monsters. Still, Black Crystal has impressed me by its sheer quantity and generally high quality of presentation. I'm afraid I've become an addict."

"...Black Crystal is a great graphic adventure that sees you traversing a variety of different environments to destroy the gem of the title. Spread across six impressive-looking maps, you’re given a variety of tasks ranging from retrieving keys to fighting dragons. ...the gripping gameplay will constantly push you forward for one more go."

"...There are a few of these games that have gone down is history... 3D defender, Black Crystal, QS Scramble and Galactic Trooper are all worth a play."

== See also ==
- Volcanic Dungeon
- The Wrath of Magra
