= Aero Publishers =

- Founded: 1939; 87 years ago
- Founder: Ernie Gentile
- Successor: TAB Books
- Country of origin: United States
- Headquarters location: Fallbrook, California
- Publication types: Monographs
- Fiction genres: Aviation

Aero Publishers was a publishing company focused on aviation history based in Fallbrook, California. It was known for publishing technical reference books.

== History ==
Aero Publishers was initially founded in 1939 by Lockheed Aircraft Corporation as an in-house publishing company to educate new employees. After it went bankrupt in 1946 it was purchased by Ernie Gentile, the employee who responsible for its creation as well as a technical writer at the California Institute of Technology. The company was based in the Silver Lake District of Los Angeles until January 1965. It then moved to a 15,000 sq ft (1,400 m^{2}) facility in Fallbrook, California. The company experienced a downturn in the early 1970s, but by 1974 it had published an estimated 150 books and was selling an average of 4,000 to 5,000 copies. It had also began expanding into automotive history.

For a time, it was the only publisher that was present at events such as the Air Force Association national convention.

The company was in the process of being sold to TAB Books when its building was destroyed in a pair of arson fires in 1985, with the latter leaving it a total loss. The following year construction on a new building at the same location was underway.

== Series ==
- Aero
- Colors & Markings
- Detail & Scale
- U.S. Civil Aircraft

== Authors ==
- Ed Maloney
- Heinz J. Nowarra
