= Morloc's Tower =

1980 video game

- Publisher: Automated Simulations
- Series: Dunjonquest
- Platforms: Apple II, Atari 8-bit, PET, IBM PC, TRS-80
- Release: 1980
- Genre: Adventure

Morloc's Tower is a video game in the Dunjonquest series published by Automated Simulations in 1980.

== Gameplay ==
The tower has six stories and consists of 30 rooms total. Morloc's Tower has more pronounced adventure game elements, as some of the treasures found in the dungeon have to be used for a specific purpose. The player character is again predefined as Brian Hammerhand. Morloc himself is the first boss enemy in the series, who has to be defeated within 45 minutes after starting the game.

== Reception ==
Gregg Williams wrote in Byte: "The game takes place in real time, which means you have to act quickly in fights. This makes the game a lot more interesting than most Adventures."

Len Lindsay for Compute! said "Automated Simulations hopes that after playing Morloc's Tower, you will want to try their own simulation games. As for myself, I can't wait till the next one is released."

The Book of Atari Software 1983 rated the game a B+ overall.
