= Hellfire Warrior =

1980 video game

- Developer: Automated Simulations
- Series: Dunjonquest
- Platforms: Apple II, Atari 8-bit, TRS-80, PET
- Release: 1980: TRS-80, PET, Apple II; 1982: Atari 8-bit
- Genre: Dungeon crawl RPG

Hellfire Warrior is a dungeon crawl video game for the Apple II, Commodore PET, and TRS-80 published by Automated Simulations in 1980. A port to Atari 8-bit computers was released in 1982. Hellfire Warrior is the direct sequel to 1979's Temple of Apshai. Two expansion packs were published.

== Gameplay ==
Hellfire Warrior leads players into the ruins that are unearthed below the Temple of Apshai. The levels are "The Lower Reaches of Apshai", "The Labyrinth" of the minotaur, "The Vault of the Dead" and "The Plains of Hell". Only the first and third levels have room numbers and descriptions. The game is meant for expert players and characters who already explored all the levels of Temple of Apshai; advertisements warned that "newcomers to Dunjonquest should begin with something easier". The complexity is also increased, with more shops and several new strengthening potions, some of which can give the player character an addiction. While the focus is still mostly on becoming stronger and richer, the last level also has the secondary objective of rescuing a princess from hell, who is represented as a particularly heavy treasure. There is still no ending trigger related to this goal, though.

== Reception ==
Forrest Johnson reviewed Hellfire Warrior in The Space Gamer No. 38. Johnson commented that "I won't forget my last view of Sanson - badly wounded, crawling desperately towards the exit, with sweet-but-cumbersome Brynhild in tow and an outraged fiend at his heels. If you enjoyed the earlier games, Hellfire Warrior is a must."

Computer Gaming World in 1993 stated that Hellfire Warrior was "better than Apshai, but not by too much", criticizing the outcome of rescuing the princess.

== Expansions ==
=== The Keys of Acheron (1981) ===
The first expansion pack to Hellfire Warrior is The Keys of Acheron by designer Paul Reiche III. In it, the player attempts to recover four magical gems (the eponymous keys) for the wizard Abosandrus in order to prevent the immortal demon Kronus from invading the Earth. Kronus pursues the player through the four levels: "Abode of the Dragon", "The Temple in the Jungle", "The Crystal Caves", and "The Shadowland of Kronus."

=== Danger in Drindisti (1982) ===
The second expansion pack for Hellfire Warrior is Danger in Drindisti by designer Rudy Kraft. In it, the player attempts to defeat four enemies of the wizard Yoturni, the Wizard King of Drindisti. Since a lack of room descriptions in level 6 and 8 are a restriction of the Hellfire Warrior program, the dungeons were built around that fact and are suggested to be played out of order: "The Glass Wizard" (level 7), "The Abode of the Illusionist" (level 6), "The Temple of the Demonmaster" (level 9), and "The Realm of Mist" (level 8).
