= Wall Street (video game) =

1981 video game

- Developer(s): Donald Brown
- Publisher(s): CE Software
- Platform(s): Apple II
- Release: 1981
- Genre(s): Simulation

Wall Street is a 1981 video game published by CE Software.

== Gameplay ==
Wall Street is a game in which the stock market is simulated.

== Reception ==
Daniel Hockman reviewed the game for Computer Gaming World, and stated that: "One of the best features of the game is the ability to list the day's stock quotes on a printer. This has two advantages over viewing the quotes on a CRT. First, you must flip through several "pages" of the daily report to see all the stocks on a CRT. Second, hard copy allows you to get a history on a stock."

Bob Proctor reviewed the game for Computer Gaming World, and stated that: "I don't think this game is realistic -- IBM won't go bankrupt in 2 weeks and real tips are free and unreliable rather than expensive and 100% reliable -- but the player interaction makes Wall Street the most interesting stock market game yet."
