= Adventure Construction Set =

1984 game creation system

- Developers: Stuart Smith; Fantasia Systems (Amiga)
- Publishers: NA: Electronic Arts; EU: Ariolasoft
- Platforms: Amiga, Apple II, Commodore 64, MS-DOS
- Release: 1984: C64; 1985: Apple II; 1986: Amiga; 1987: MS-DOS
- Genres: Adventure, game creation system
- Modes: Single-player, multiplayer

Adventure Construction Set (ACS) is a game creation system written by Stuart Smith that is used to construct tile-based graphical adventure games. ACS was published by Electronic Arts in 1984 for the Commodore 64, then for the Apple II, Amiga, and MS-DOS. Smith previously developed several commercial adventure games of a similar style, such as Ali Baba and the Forty Thieves (1981).

ACS provides a graphical editor for the construction of maps, placement of creatures and items, and menu-based scripting to control game logic. A constructed game is stored on its own disk which can be copied and shared with friends; games exported from the Amiga version still require ACS to play. A complete game is included: Rivers of Light, based on the Epic of Gilgamesh. The Amiga version has an additional pre-made adventure called "Galactic Agent" by Ken St. Andre.

Todd Howard revealed that when Bethesda started making Morrowind, he was excited about making a tool like Stuart Smith's Adventure Construction Set for the Apple II.

== Gameplay ==
Gameplay features of Adventure Construction Set include:

- Turn-based system.
- Up to four players may play.
- A player character can be imported from another adventure, but the character might not retain the same graphic tile if the new adventure uses a different tile set.
- Music and sound.
- Random encounters.
- Spells.
- Range and melee combat.
- Along with graphic tiles, text screens are also available for conveying information.
- Creatures which behave as player-mimics, copying various traits and equipment of the player.
- Shops.

== Construction system ==
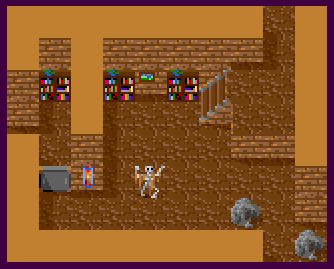
A room built with a custom tile set (Amiga)

Adventure Construction Set was designed to make tile-based graphical adventure games similar to author Stuart Smith's earlier games The Return of Heracles and Ali Baba and the Forty Thieves.

The framework of an adventure built within ACS is organized into the following main categories:

- "World map": This is the top-level map from which characters begin their adventure. The world map differs from other playable areas of the game in that it has no fixed creature encounters, no stacked tiles, quicker movement, it is scrollable, and it optionally may wrap around (have no borders). Random encounters may occur on the world map, during which the game switches to a special view similar to a "room" to handle the encounter.
- "Regions": A region is a collection of rooms. A region is a construction concept and does not present itself to the player, except by indirect means such as disk access when traveling between regions.
- "Rooms": A room is a rectangular, tiled area of a size which must fit within the game's viewport. Tiles may be used to make a room look like shapes other than rectangular.
- "Things": A thing is a background tile, obstacle, or collectible item.
- "Creatures"
- "Pictures": These are art assets used by the tiles. For some platforms, four colors are available for images. For the Amiga platform, 32 colors are available, each of which can be assigned to be any of 4096 available colors.

Tiles may be stacked. Only the top tile of a stack may be directly interacted with by the player, but special tiles allow for game-logic to be implemented via the stack. For example, a tile may be set to "Activate All Things at This Place". Tiles may also allow or disallow interaction based on the contents of the player's inventory, or activate if a specific object is dropped on top of the stack.

Spell-effects may be attached to Things.

The game allows for somewhat varied monster AI behavior. A creature may be specified to behave solely as a "fighter" or "slinker", or adjust its temperament based on its condition. In addition, it may be specified as either an "enemy", "friend", "neutral", or "thief", with a total of 8 possible behavioral patterns expressed.

There are maximum quotas applied to most categories in the game (including the total number of unique things, text messages, pictures, regions, creatures per region, things per region, and rooms per region). These limits restrict the size of adventures. For example, each adventure can contain up to 15 regions and each region can contain up to 16 rooms.

ACS included a framework for fantasy adventures, as well as starter toolkits for fantasy, futurist, and "spy" game genres.

=== Auto-Construct ===
Along with user-constructed adventures, the software can also auto-construct a random adventure. This feature can optionally be used to auto-complete a partially built adventure. The user may specify numerous parameters for auto-generation, including difficulty level.

== Development ==
Stuart Smith stated that the concept was based on his experience writing accounting software, during which he developed a report generator that would create a standalone COBOL program, and that Electronic Arts suggested the name Adventure Construction Set. It was produced by Don Daglow in parallel with the development of Racing Destruction Set.

In a 2020 interview, Smith said that he wrote Adventure Construction Set in the Forth programming language on a Commodore 64.

== Release ==
Shortly after Adventure Construction Set's release, announcements were included in the packaging for players to submit their adventures for a contest to be judged by Electronic Arts and their playtesters. Approximately 50 games were submitted and winners chosen for three categories:

- Fantasy: Festival by R.C. Purrenhage
- Science fiction: Cosmos by Albert Jerng
- Contemporary: Panama by Will Bryant and Codename: Viper by Peter Schroeder

The supplementary manual included with the Amiga port mentions, "If you're an ACS fanatic you can join the Adventure Construction Set Club. Club members receive access to a library of adventures created with ACS". The supplementary manual also mentions that the club is not affiliated with Electronic Arts.

== Reception ==
Troy Christensen reviewed Adventure Construction Set for Different Worlds magazine and stated that "The Adventure Construction Set comes with a 44·page manual, a two-sided diskette, one large pre-constructed adventure where your characters are transported to Egypt during the times of the pharaohs, and seven mini-adventures that will whisk your characters off to places such as the starship Enterprise and Alice's Wonderland."

Orson Scott Card criticized Adventure Construction Set's user interface, stating that it "was designed by the Kludge Monster from the Nethermost Hell". He praised the game's flexibility, however, reporting that his son was able to create a spell called "Summon Duck". Computer Gaming World's Scorpia described ACS as an "easy-to-use, albeit time-consuming, means of creating a graphic adventure".

== See also ==
- Music Construction Set
- Pinball Construction Set
- Racing Destruction Set
- The Quill (software)
