= Ali Baba and the Forty Thieves (video game) =

1981 video game

- Developer: Stuart Smith
- Publisher: Quality Software
- Platforms: Apple II, Atari 8-bit, FM-7, PC-88
- Release: 1981: Atari; 1982: Apple; 1985: FM-7, PC-88

Ali Baba and the Forty Thieves is dungeon crawl role-playing video game written by Stuart Smith for the Atari 8-bit computers and published by Quality Software 1981. An Apple II version was released in 1982, followed by ports for the FM-7 and the PC-8800 series in 1985. It is the second of four role playing games written by Smith, following Fracas, and preceding The Return of Heracles and Adventure Construction Set.

== Gameplay ==
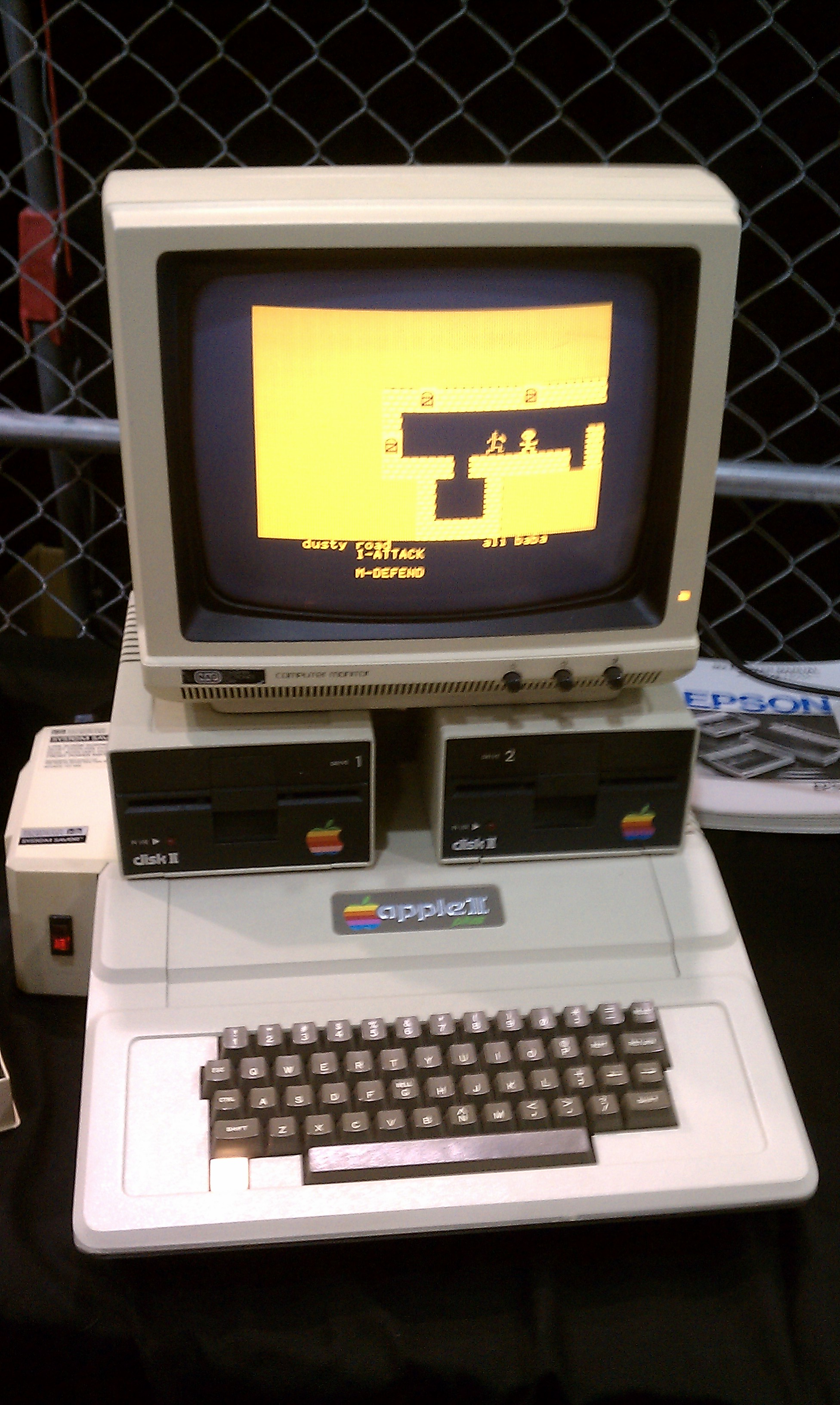
The game on an Apple II

The player plays as Ali Baba, and travels through a maze-like map of the city and surrounding wilderness in order to rescue a princess. The game involves interaction with shopkeepers and enemies throughout the game's extensive map. Ali Baba and the Forty Thieves incorporates some Dungeons & Dragons conventions as well as various mythological and superstitious elements into the storyline and environment. These include the Western zodiac and ancient Arabic fairytales. The game is also notable for several features rarely seen in RPGs at the time: cooperative multi-player for up to 17 players (using a 'hot-seat'), player defined objectives, and the option to complete the game peacefully (without attacking enemies).

== Reception ==
Softline stated that "Ali Baba displays a sense of creative humor that lifts it above routine adventure games ... The text is fresh, the action fast-paced". The magazine called the graphics "simplistic", but praised "its sense of discovery".

== Legacy ==
Electronic Arts later combined Ali Baba and the Forty Thieves and The Return of Heracles into Age of Adventure, which was ported to the Commodore 64.
