= The Return of Heracles =

1983 video game

- Developer: Stuart Smith
- Publisher: Quality Software
- Platforms: Apple II, Atari 8-bit, Commodore 64
- Release: 1983
- Genre: Role-playing

The Return of Heracles is a role-playing video game for the Atari 8-bit computers, Commodore 64 and Apple II. It was written by Stuart Smith and published by Quality Software in 1983. Following Smith's adventure role playing games Fracas and Ali Baba and the Forty Thieves, and built on an engine that was a precursor to Adventure Construction Set, The Return of Heracles is set in the age of Greek myth and allows the player to assume the role of one or more heroes and attempt various quests.

It was later bundled with Ali Baba and the Forty Thieves in a compilation called Age of Adventure, published by Electronic Arts.

== Gameplay ==
The Return of Heracles is an RPG adventure. Each character is defined by three basic characteristics: strength, dexterity, and speed. Strength and dexterity determine how effective a character is in combat, while speed determines how many squares can be moved in one turn. Characters may also have special training in defensive techniques, use of the sword, and use of the dagger.

== Reception ==
Softline called Heracles "Lively and colorful ... truly a must" for gamers. Computer Gaming World praised the game's transparency, stating "The rules explain themselves. Although documentation comes with it, you'll never have to read it." Although the magazine found the game enjoyable, several flaws were noted, particularly the inaccuracies pertaining to Greek mythology.
