= Pedit5 =

1975 video game

pedit5
- Pedit5.png Gameplay
- Designer: Rusty Rutherford
- Platform: PLATO
- Release: NA: Late 1975
- Genres: Dungeon crawl, role-playing game
- Mode: Single-player

pedit5, alternately called The Dungeon, is a 1975 dungeon crawl role-playing video game developed for the University of Illinois Urbana-Champaign's PLATO computer network by Rusty Rutherford. In it, the player controls a character exploring a fixed, single-level dungeon containing randomly-generated monster encounters and treasure. When they encounter a monster, they can fight the monster with a weapon or spells, or attempt to flee. Characters can be saved between sessions.

Rutherford developed the game over four to six weeks in late 1975 as a computerized take on the Dungeons & Dragons role-playing game. Its file was named pedit5, as it was stored in the fifth lesson slot of the school's Population & Energy group. It is considered to be the first example of a dungeon crawl video game and one of the first computer role-playing games. An improved version was later created on the PLATO network as orthanc.

== Gameplay ==
pedit5 is a dungeon crawl role-playing video game, in which the player guides a character who wanders a single-level dungeon accumulating treasure and killing monsters. When a player encounters a monster, they can use one of several spells. Characters can be saved from one play session to the next. The dungeon is rendered in a two-dimensional overhead view using on-screen character graphics, and controlled via keyboard commands. The dungeon has a fixed layout, but the monster encounters and treasure are randomly generated. They are generated whenever a new character was created, and saved with the character. When the player encounters a monster, they can choose to fight, cast a spell, or run; if the player does not immediately defeat or flee the monster, the player-character and monster fight to the death in a battle controlled by the game without further player input.

== Development ==
The game was developed by Rusty Rutherford over four to six weeks in late 1975 for the University of Illinois Urbana-Champaign's PLATO computer network, which by the 1970s supported several thousand graphical terminals distributed worldwide, running processes on nearly a dozen different networked mainframe computers. Rutherford had been playing the role-playing game Dungeons & Dragons since earlier in the year, and wanted to create a video game based on the concept. He knew of another game based on the same concept that was under development in the PLATO system, under the title dnd, but as it had not yet been finished he wanted to start on his own version. As the dnd project had promised to be a multiplayer game but had not yet been able to deliver the feature—nor would it—he set out to create a single-player game. Rutherford tried to use Dungeons & Dragons concepts as much as possible, including hit points, levels, and experience and treasure rewards for defeating monsters. The player-character was a combination of a fighter, magic user, and cleric. The limitations of the system required Rutherford to compromise on size; the dungeon was limited to 40–50 rooms on a single level, and the game could only store 20 players at a time, which Rutherford later said was a large problem when the game became popular.

The game was named pedit5 (although this title never appears within the game) as Rusty Rutherford was a member of the Population and Energy Group at University of Illinois, Urbana-Champaign; each group was assigned a limited number of program slots on the school's mainframe, with the Population and Energy Group having program slots names "pedit1" through "pedit5". The group had used the first three slots, and Rutherford was able to code his game into the fifth slot, which became the game's default name. Rutherford used pedit4 for the game's manual. Because at the time the game was not deemed appropriate for use of the resources by system administrators, pedit5 was eventually deleted, but Rutherford continually restored it.

== Legacy ==
pedit5 was one of the first computer role-playing games; pedit5, dnd, and Dungeon were all created around the same time in 1975, though they may have been preceded by the swiftly-deleted m199h in 1974. It is considered to be the first example of a dungeon crawl game. The random generation of monster encounters and treasure makes the game an early predecessor of the roguelike genre.

A new version of the game, based on the original work but significantly expanded, was written by three other programmers as orthanc, named after a tower in The Lord of the Rings. The original version of pedit5 was resurrected as orthanc1. Both orthanc and orthanc1 remained on the PLATO system. Since then, copies of the game's source code have been made available allowing users to play the title on the PLATO (Cybis) system, or an emulator of it, connected to the Internet.
