= Expedition Amazon =

1983 video game

- Publisher: Penguin Software
- Designer: Willard Phillips
- Platforms: Apple II, Commodore 64, FM-7, PC-88, PC-98
- Release: 1983: Apple; 1984: C64
- Genre: Role-playing

Expedition Amazon is a 1983 role-playing video game designed by Willard Phillips for the Apple II and published by Penguin Software. The goal of the game is to guide four explorers as they study Incan ruins. There are four classes in the game: Medic, Field Assistant, Radio Operator, and Guard.

== Reception ==
Computer Gaming World criticized its documentation, but called Expedition Amazon "a very enjoyable game that doesn't take itself too seriously" and suggested that it be played with friends.
