= SwordThrust =

1981 video game

- Developer: Donald Brown
- Publisher: CE Software
- Designer: Donald Brown
- Platform: Apple II
- Release: May 1981
- Genre: Adventure / RPG
- Mode: Single-player

SwordThrust is an interactive text adventure game for the Apple II, created by Donald Brown and published by CE Software in 1981. It consists of seven separate adventures (each sold separately) and is the commercial successor to Brown's Eamon (1980).

== Premise ==
Players take on the role of a warrior/adventurer in the magical, feudal world of Diurla. Play begins at the Main Hall of the Guild of Free Rogues, where the player creates a character, buys equipment and learns spells before venturing out to gain wealth and experience. Each scenario has a different goal, and typically a time limit. A save option is available, allowing the player to suspend the game and pick it up later.

== Adventures ==
Seven separate adventures were released for the SwordThrust system:

1. The King's Testing Ground by Donald Brown. Intended for "beginning rogues", this adventure is the equivalent of Eamon's Beginners Cave and contains relatively easy opponents.
2. The Vampyre Caves by Donald Brown
3. The Kidnappers Cove by Donald Brown
4. The Case of the Sultan's Pearl by Donald Brown
5. The Green Plague by Donald Brown
6. The Eternal Curse by Donald Brown
7. The Hall of Alchemie by Peter Wityk

== Reception ==
Forrest Johnson reviewed SwordThrust in The Space Gamer No. 43. Johnson commented that "SwordThrust is not the best game of its type; it's the only. It has flaws, but so does every milestone."

Debuting in May 1981, Swordthrust #1 sold 1,000 copies by June 1982, appearing on Computer Gaming World's list of top sellers. A 1982 review in the magazine praised the game's departure from the typical Dungeons & Dragons character class system, instead allowing a character to advance in any skill, closer in style to RuneQuest. Computer Gaming World stated in 1991 and 1993 "It's a pity that Swordthrust did not survive into the graphic era, as it had great potential".

Dale Archibald reviewed Sword Thrust #1: The King's Testing Ground in Ares Magazine #14 and commented that "if gothic, nurse, mystery and western writers can publish four books at a time about a character, why can't a software publisher? It's an attractive idea, if you've got a good character and good plots. Brown has the best character going: you. And his plots are interesting."

Norman Banduch reviewed The Eternal Curse in The Space Gamer No. 58. Banduch commented that "The Eternal Curse is an excellent adventure program, ideal for building up characters for other SwordThrust adventures. It is also good fun on its own."

== See also ==
- Eamon, the non-commercial predecessor to SwordThrust.
