= Gateway to Apshai =

1983 video game

- Developer: The Connelley Group
- Publisher: Epyx
- Programmer: Michael Farren (Atari)
- Series: Dunjonquest
- Platforms: Atari 8-bit, Commodore 64, ColecoVision
- Release: 1983
- Genre: Action-adventure
- Mode: Single-player

Gateway to Apshai is an action-adventure game for the Commodore 64, ColecoVision and Atari 8-bit computers. It was developed by The Connelley Group and published by Epyx in 1983 as a prequel to Temple of Apshai. It is a more action-oriented version of Temple of Apshai, with smoother and faster graphics, streamlined controls, fewer role-playing video game elements, and fewer room descriptions.

In Gateway to Apshai the player assumes the role of an unnamed adventurer, who tries to survive a series of increasingly difficult dungeon levels filled with both treasure and monsters. Each level is played within a freely selectable dungeon. Level 8 of the dungeon perpetually repeats until the player runs out of lives, ending the game.

== Plot ==
At the start of the game, fighting a garter snake

The player's character is summoned to the chambers of an old priest called Merlis, who informs him that he is the son of the greatest warrior of Apshai, and that it is written in the prophecy that only he can reclaim the fabled Temple of Apshai and rid the land of its monsters and curses. This game covers the Gateway to Apshai, which they have to clear in order to reach the Temple of Apshai.

== Gameplay ==
The player is initially armed with a dagger and clad in leather armor. As play progresses, they obtain new weapons, armor, potions, eyeglasses, and scrolls containing magical spells. Various enemies, ranging from simple rats and snakes to giants, inhabit the dungeon. The player must kill them with weapons or magical spells.

The levels become progressively harder to survive as the player descends deeper and deeper into the dungeon. Each dungeon is covered in complete darkness that illuminates as the dungeon rooms and corridors are explored. The Gateway consists of 8 levels, each consisting of 16 dungeons, each consisting of 60 rooms, for a total of 7,680 rooms.

C64 screenshot

The player gets approximately six and a half minutes to explore each level. Once the time passes, if they are still alive, they advance to the next deeper level.

== Reception ==
Softline called Gateway to Apshai "a great game ... enthralling". ANALOG Computing criticized the lack of a save game feature, but praised the replayability and speed of the gameplay, graphics, and loading time. Ahoy! praised the game's size and recommended that two people play together. It concluded that Gateway to Apshai "is a marvelous game, a must for D & D freaks". Hi-Res called the game "well designed, fun to play" and liked the graphics and sound, but also criticized the lack of a save game feature. The Addison-Wesley Book of Atari Software 1984 gave the game an overall B rating, concluding that it was "a better game in many ways" to Temple of Apshai because of the faster pace, fewer keyboard commands, and cartridge format. Computer and Video Games rated the ColecoVision version 64% in 1989.
