= The Datestones of Ryn =

1979 video game

- PET cover art
- Developer: Automated Simulations
- Publisher: Automated Simulations
- Platforms: Apple II, Atari 8-bit, PET, TRS-80
- Release: 1979: Apple, TRS-80, PET; 1981: Atari
- Genre: Role-playing
- Mode: Single-player

The Datestones of Ryn is a role-playing video game released in 1979 for the Apple II, Commodore PET, and TRS-80 by Automated Simulations. The Datestones of Ryn is the second title in the Dunjonquest series, but was actually a prequel to the first game, Temple of Apshai. Like its predecessor, this game is written in BASIC.

A port to Atari 8-bit computers programmed by Aric Wilmunder was published in 1981.

== Gameplay ==
The player assumes the role of an adventurer, Brian Hammerhand, the hero from the first game, Temple of Apshai. But, as this game takes place chronologically before Temple, Hammerhand is a young soldier, not a tired veteran. Thieves have stolen Datestones for the calendar of Ryn and escaped to a cave. Hammerhand's leader has sent him into the cave to retrieve them.

Unlike Temple, players have a time limit - 20 minutes - in which to complete the game. Given this, the adventure is much shorter than its predecessor, consisting of just one level. Thus it served as Epyx's first MicroQuest and sold for half of their regular games. This was also Epyx's first attempt at making RPGs more action-oriented and ushering the creation of the action role-playing game.

The adventurer encounters brigands and monsters in the dunjon. Slaying them and bringing back their heads garners higher scores. Retrieving the Datestones and bringing them back to the cave entrance must be done within the time limit, or the game is forfeit. Hammerhand can only carry a limited weight, so he must return to the cave's entrance several times, all eating up precious time.

Given that the combat system has a high random factor and the time limit, this game was difficult to complete.

== Reception ==
Robert Plamondon reviewed The Datestones of Ryn for Different Worlds magazine and stated that "Because the game is easy to play, and challenging enough to play many times, I would recommend Datestones of Ryn to all of you with access to an appropriate computer."
