= TAB Books =

- Parent company: McGraw-Hill Education
- Founded: 1964
- Country of origin: United States
- Headquarters location: New York, New York
- Publication types: Books, Ebooks

TAB is an imprint of McGraw-Hill Education, based in New York, New York, that publishes do-it-yourself technology books for makers, electronics hobbyists, students, and inventors.

== Company ==
Originally based in Blue Ridge Summit, Pennsylvania, TAB was founded by Verne M. Ray and Malcolm Parks Jr. in 1964 to publish technically oriented magazines. TAB is an acronym for Technical Author's Bureau. It became TAB Books Inc. in 1980 and published books in a wide variety of mostly technical fields. It was acquired by McGraw-Hill in 1990, at which time it published books in 12 fields including computing, electronics, aviation, engineering, maritime, and several how-to subjects, including such diverse titles as The Complete Guide to Single Engine Cessnas, The Complete Shortwave Listener's Handbook, Constructing and Maintaining Your Well and Septic System, ABCs of Building Model Railroad Cars, Practical Blacksmithing and Metalworking, and the Encyclopedia of Electronics. The latter work was named by the American Library Association (ALA) in its list of "Best References of the 1980s."

== See also ==
- Aero Publishers
