= DND (video game) =

1977 video game

- Developer: Daniel M. Lawrence
- Platform: PDP-10
- Release: 1977
- Genre: Role-playing video game

DND is a role-playing video game developed by Purdue University student Daniel Lawrence in 1977 for the Digital Equipment Corporation (DEC) PDP-10 mainframe computer. The name DND is derived from the abbreviation "D&D" from the original tabletop role-playing game Dungeons & Dragons. It was later ported to several other computer systems and languages. After Lawrence re-used code from the game in the 1982 role-playing game Telengard, DEC ordered DND be removed from their computers to avoid litigation by Telengard's publisher. DND was one of the earliest role-playing video games, as part of a set of games developed in the 1970s based on the 1974 Dungeons & Dragons.

== Development ==
DND was written in BASIC for the TOPS-10 time-share operating system by Daniel Lawrence, a student at Purdue University, for the Digital Equipment Corporation (DEC) PDP-10 mainframe computer and released around 1977. It was one of several freeware games based on Dungeons & Dragons in the 1970s. Later the game found its way to DEC and was there rewritten in 1983 to Pascal.

== Legacy ==
DND was one of the earliest role-playing video games, which began to appear around 1975, and like DND were largely based on Dungeons & Dragons (1974). Lawrence re-used some of the code for the game for the 1982 role-playing game Telengard. This led to DEC ordering DND to be removed from all DEC computers in September 1983 to avoid litigation from Telengard's publisher, Avalon Hill. Due to the BASIC source code availability, the game was later ported and adapted to newer systems and programming languages. One such port was to MS-DOS in 1984 by R.O. Software, which sold the game under a US$25 shareware license without first seeking permission from Avalon Hill or Lawrence.
