= Volcanic Dungeon =

1983 video game

- Publishers: Carnell Software; Mastervision
- Designers: Roy Carnell; Stuart A. Galloway
- Platforms: Dragon 32/64, ZX Spectrum, ZX81
- Release: 1983
- Genre: Role-playing

Volcanic Dungeon is a role-playing video game designed by Roy Carnell and Stuart A. Galloway and released by Carnell Software for the ZX Spectrum, Dragon 32/64 and ZX81 computers in 1983. It is a follow-up to 1982's Black Crystal.

== Plot ==
A war between the forces of good and evil has been won by the light, and the dark goddess Methzar and the Snow Queen were both defeated. However, the witch Magra has managed to escape with some of her army into the titular volcanic dungeon, taking with her a captive elfin princess named Edora. The task of a hero known as the Knight of Star Jewel is to hunt down and kill Magra, and to rescue Edora from her glass coffin.

== Reception ==
In a "Favourites of Yesteryear" article in 1984, Sinclair User rated it 5/10, complaining of the game's slowness and how "death is always too swift. It is as if the computer is playing the player and not the other way around."

According to their 1985 annual published later in the year, "Volcanic deserves recognition as the first graphics adventure for the ZX-81, and therefore one of the first of all adventures. Unfortunately, the game mechanics are rather crude and it is frequently a matter of good fortune."

== Legacy ==
Volcanic Dungeon was the second part of the 'Third Continent Trilogy'; See also Black Crystal, 1982 and, The Wrath of Magra, 1984.

The BASIC source code listing of Volcanic Dungeon is available online.
