= Donald Brown (programmer) =

Computer programmer

Donald M. Brown is a programmer and the creator of Eamon, a long-running non-commercial role-playing game series for the Apple II computer first released in 1980.

== CE Software ==
Brown was a founding partner of CE Software in West Des Moines, Iowa and created at least two games for the company: SwordThrust, an expanded commercial version of Eamon, and Wall Street, a financial strategy game. Brown was later instrumental in the development of CE Software's QuicKeys macro recorder software and the QuickMail email client for the Macintosh. In the 1980s, Donald Brown produced the antivirus software Vaccine for the Macintosh. In addition, Donald Brown produced the Executive Decision Maker desk accessory and the Desk Accessory Mover software utility; the latter was one of the first (if not the first) utilities that allowed users to install and move desk accessories on the Apple Macintosh platform. Brown later worked for Prairie Group, a software development company in West Des Moines.

== Other work ==
Donald Brown also worked for Spymac, and led development of their Wheel suite of internet applications.
