= Tunnels of Doom =

1982 video game

- Developer: Texas Instruments
- Publisher: Texas Instruments
- Designer: Kevin Kenney
- Composer: Hank Mishkoff
- Platform: TI-99/4A
- Release: December 31, 1982
- Genre: Role-playing

Tunnels of Doom is a role-playing video game programmed by Kevin Kenney for the TI-99/4A home computer and published by Texas Instruments on December 31, 1982. It was available in two formats: cartridge with accompanying disk and cartridge with cassette.

Based loosely on the tabletop role-playing game Dungeons & Dragons, it is a dungeon crawl in which players control the fates of 1–4 characters as they navigate a maze of tunnels. Texas Instruments used the game in its marketing, citing it as entertainment software involving "strategy and logic".

== Gameplay ==
The game has four character classes: hero, fighter, rogue, and wizard. The "hero" class is only available in a single character game.

Upon encountering an enemy, the game transitions to a separate, graphical, overhead battle screen, where a tactical turn-based combat system is used that allows for movement and positioning. It's possible to listen at doors for sounds of monsters, which can be negotiated with in combat as well.

== Legacy ==
In 2008, Howard Kistler of DreamCodex developed a revised version of the game with the permission of Kevin Kenney.
