= The Wrath of Magra =

1984 video game

- Developer: Carnell Software
- Publishers: Carnell Software, Mastertronic
- Designers: Roy Carnell; Stephen Kirk; Stuart A. Galloway
- Platform: ZX Spectrum
- Release: 19 March 1984
- Genres: RPG, adventure

The Wrath of Magra is a role-playing video game published by Carnell Software for the ZX Spectrum in 1984. It is a sequel to 1983's Volcanic Dungeon.

The game contents included two program cassettes, a manual, and a 158-page paperback book entitled 'The Book of Shadows' containing stories, a bestiary, spells, and over 50 black and white illustrations.

Carnell went into liquidation soon after publication and the game was re-released later in the year by Mastertronic.

== Plot ==
In Volcanic Dungeon, the Knight of Star Jewel rescued the kidnapped Princess Edora and killed her evil captor Magra, the most powerful sorceress in the world. However, Magra has been restored back to life by her followers and wants revenge upon the man who defeated her. She cursed Edora and so the knight needs to once again save the princess. He needs to reach Magra's castle in the Black Mountains and find a way to destroy the witch forever.

== Reception ==
Wrath of Magra was generally well received. It received review ratings of 30/40 from Personal Computer Games and 8/10 from Sinclair User. Crash, however, gave it an average score of 5/10, while Computer and Video Games scored it only 3/10.

D J Robinson reviewed The Wrath of Magra for Imagine magazine, and stated that "In conclusion, The Wrath of Magra is an exceptionally good adventure, well written and presented, with a vast amount of atmosphere and the best background material I have ever seen."
