= Star Warrior =

1980 video game

- Developer: Automated Simulations
- Publisher: Automated Simulations
- Designers: Jon Freeman; Jim Connelley
- Platforms: Apple II, Atari 8-bit, TRS-80
- Release: 1980
- Genre: Role-playing
- Mode: Single-player

Star Warrior is a 1980 science fiction role-playing video game written and published by Automated Simulations (later renamed to Epyx) for the Apple II, TRS-80, and Atari 8-bit computers. The game is branded as part of the Starquest series, consisting of Star Warrior and the otherwise unrelated Rescue at Rigel.

== Description ==
Players take on the role of one of two members of the Furies, a mercenary group that only accepts assignments that meet their Samurai-like code. In Star Warrior the Furies have been hired by the people of Fornax, who were recently annexed by the Interstellar Union of Civilized Peoples but wish a return to autonomous rule.

Two agents are sent on separate missions, which occur simultaneously. In one, the agent must draw off and destroy enemy forces to guarantee success of the second, where the agent tracks down and kills the Stellar Union's military governor. A "directional indicator" points the way to mission objectives.

== Gameplay ==
Atari 8-bit version screenshot

Star Warrior is based on a modified version of the BASIC game engine as previous Apshai-based games. In previous games the playfield was presented as a top-down view of a series of interconnected rooms. Only one room would be displayed at a time, and a new room would be drawn after the player moved through a door. In Star Warrior the action takes place outdoors, the first Epyx game to do so, with the display showing a one-kilometer area from a seven-by-nine kilometer map, redrawn and re-centered when the player reaches the edge of the current displayed area.

Sighting and range considerations were added to the engine, allowing the player to only see objects within the line-of-sight, and at distances based on target size. The computer shares this limitation, allowing the player to hide behind objects to escape detection. In older Apshai-based games sighting was much simpler, simply showing everything within the current room. Another change is the use of energy to power most player devices, including weapons, shielding, and sensors. This limits the number of devices that can be turned on at once and requires recharge time after taking damage.

The map includes various buildings, both civilian and military fortresses, as well as mobile and fixed-place enemies, such as turrets. Buildings can only be damaged by the Fury's limited number of missiles, while the blaster and powergun can damage smaller targets. The player selects one of three suits of armor at the start of the game, each with different equipment tradeoffs, including sensor suite, shield strength, weapons, and the ability to fly. Players can also design their own suits at the start of the game, selecting among various equipment within a total budget of 2,500 credits. Equipment damaged in combat can be automatically repaired, although this depletes both energy and time, and most suits include a medical system that does the same for the player character.

The game is turn-based, with the user given a certain number of points to be spent every turn, with various actions assigned different point values. The system in Star Warrior is similar to the one used in previous games like Temple of Apshai. In the decoy mission the player selects their own time limit before being recalled to his or her ship, but in the assault mission the game ends only when the governor or player is killed. This differs somewhat from the other Starquest release, Rescue at Rigel, which has a fixed time limit of sixty turns.

== Reception ==
Glenn Mai reviewed Star Warrior in The Space Gamer No. 39. Mai commented that "If you have the money buy the game; if you don't have the money, get the money and buy the game. Highly recommended to any wargamer or arcade buff."

Star Warrior was granted an award in the category of "Best Science Fiction/Fantasy Computer Game" at the 4th annual Arkie Awards where judges noted that "even the instruction book is a cut above the rest".
