= Dunjonquest =

- Logo used to identify games belonging to the series on manuals and sides of packaging
- Genre: Dungeon crawl RPG
- Developer: Epyx
- Publisher: Epyx
- Creators: Jon Freeman; Jim Connelley; Jeff Johnson
- Platforms: TRS-80, Commodore PET, Apple II, Atari 8-bit, IBM PC, VIC-20, Commodore 64, Atari ST, Amiga, Mac, Amstrad CPC
- First release: Temple of Apshai; August 1979
- Latest release: Temple of Apshai Trilogy (16-bit); 1986

Dunjonquest is a series of single-player, single-character fantasy computer role-playing games by Automated Simulations (later known as Epyx). Temple of Apshai was the most successful and most widely ported game in the series. The games relied on strategy and pen & paper RPG style rules and statistics.

There were two types of Dunjonquest games:

1. Temple of Apshai, Hellfire Warrior and related expansions for both are of the larger type, and contain four dungeons each with detailed room descriptions and no time limit. These games contain an "Innkeeper" program, where the player character is created and equipment can be sold and bought. Character statistics can also be put in manually, and floppy disk versions allow to save the character between sessions. The dungeons are reset upon each visit.
2. Datestones of Ryn, Morloc's Tower and Sorcerer of Siva are confined to a single, smaller dungeon, and the player has to achieve a goal within a time limit. They have no room descriptions and no Innkeeper program, and the player character is predefined. Due to their size, these games were sold at half the price of the larger titles. Datestones of Ryn and Morloc's Tower were marketed under the MicroQuest label, which was dropped for the larger Sorcerer of Siva.

The Dunjonquest games were ported across a wide variety of late 1970s and early-to-mid 1980s home computers.

== Common elements ==
=== Gameplay and controls ===
All Dunjonquest titles were advertised as "real time" RPGs, but actually use a hybrid between a real time and turn-based system. Monsters move and take turns on their own periodic timetable, whose pace can be chosen from three options at the start of the game. Even if the player remains idle, the monsters keep advancing and attacking.

The player character is controlled with the use of keystrokes. Walking is possible in speeds from 1-9, but faster walking speeds cause more fatigue. If the "fatigue" value sinks below 0, the character cannot move anymore and has to rest, even in combat. Most actions decrease the character's stamina, but some can replenish it gradually.

=== Room descriptions ===
Dunjonquest introduced the concept of having room descriptions presented as detailed text printed in the game's manuals, similar to role-playing solitaire adventures. Each room in Temple of Apshai has a room number attached to it, displayed in the UI. By checking the corresponding room number listed in the "Chambers of the Dunjon" section in the manual, the player can get detailed descriptions of the atmosphere and objects in the rooms, like dust on the floor, particular smells in the air or peculiarities of the architecture. The descriptions warrant guesses at traps, treasures, hidden passages and lurking enemies within the room. The printed room descriptions were used as a means of overcoming the limitations of the simple black-on-white graphics and limited memory for displaying text on screen. They also serve as an early form of copyright protection. Only the larger titles in the series feature room descriptions.

=== Brian Hammerhand and William Nailfoot ===
The fictional character Brian Hammerhand regularly appears in semi-comedic short story sections in the manuals of Dunjonquest games as an introduction into the fantasy world and narrative. In the Temple of Apshai expansions Upper Reaches of Apshai and Curse of Ra, he is replaced by another character named William Nailfoot. The Hellfire Warrior expansions The Keys of Acheron and Danger in Drindisti instead have brief introductions that address the player directly in the second person.

== Games ==
(Note: The titling of all games in the series is ambiguous - The name "Dunjonquest" does never appear on the front box cover, but always precedes the actual title on the back of the box and on the manual cover. Some games and versions have it on the title screen, while others don't. The games are listed here as they appear on the box cover. Release dates of games published before 1982 are taken from the index of records of copyright claims submitted by Automated Simulations to the United States Copyright Office on April 13, 1982. Later dates are as stated in the copyright notices of the games' documentations.)

=== Temple of Apshai (August 1979) ===
The first and most successful of the Dunjonquest titles is a long form game spanning four dungeons with more than 200 rooms with detailed descriptions. It was also ported to more platforms than any of the other games. Unlike most RPGs it has no specific goal, and the player merely explores the eponymous temple to amass treasure and gain experience.

=== The Datestones of Ryn (November 1979) ===
The Datestones of Ryn was the first "MicroQuest" in the series, a short game meant for beginners. The objective is to enter a lair of robbers, find as many of the Datestones as possible and get out of the dungeon before the 20-minute time limit expires. The player is predefined as Brian Hammerhand from the stories in the manuals. There is also no shop program, as leaving the dungeon immediately ends the game.

=== Morloc's Tower (January 1980) ===
The second Microquest is "simpler than The Temple of Apshai yet more complicated than the beginner's Datestones of Ryn. The tower has six stories and consists of 30 rooms total. Morloc's Tower has more pronounced adventure game elements, as some of the treasures found in the dungeon have to be used for a specific purpose. The player character is again predefined as Brian Hammerhand. Morloc himself is the first boss enemy in the series, who has to be defeated within 45 minutes after starting the game.

=== Hellfire Warrior (September 1980) ===
Hellfire Warrior is the direct sequel to Temple of Apshai, leading players into the ruins that are unearthed below the temple. The levels are "The Lower Reaches of Apshai", "The Labyrinth" of the minotaur, "The Vault of the Dead" and "The Plains of Hell".

=== Upper Reaches of Apshai (September 1981) ===
Upper Reaches of Apshai is the first expansion to Temple of Apshai It contains four new dungeon levels for beginning characters, and conveys a more humorous tone with suburban environments like a vegetable garden and enemies like killer tomatoes. The level design and room descriptions were created by Tim Bird, Mark Madrid and Andrew Martin.

=== The Keys of Acheron (September 1981) ===
The first expansion pack to Hellfire Warrior drops the story of Brian Hammerhand or William Nailfoot in the manual and only gives a short introduction to the mission. The player once again explores four dungeon levels to find the four eponymous Keys of Acheron, while being stalked by a demon who tries to prevent this. Like in Hellfire Warrior, only two of the dungeons have room numbers. The dungeon levels were designed by Paul Reiche III.

=== Sorcerer of Siva (December 1981) ===
The last standalone title in the series is not as large as the major games, but also not as small as the MicroQuests; hence, that label is dropped. The player takes the role of a wizard, who is thrown into a labyrinth of mines by his rival.

=== Curse of Ra (1982) ===
The second expansion to Temple of Apshai, Curse of Ra, is set in ancient Egypt and has higher difficulty than the previous two parts. It also consists of four dungeon levels, with 179 rooms total. Like Upper Reaches to Apshai, the level design and room descriptions were created by Tim Bird, Mark Madrid and Andrew Martin.

=== Danger in Drindisti (1982) ===
The second expansion to Hellfire Warrior also features four dungeons. The player is tasked to defeat a boss enemy in each level. Since the lack of room descriptions in level 6 and 8 are a restriction of the Hellfire Warrior program, the dungeons were built around that fact and are supposed to be played out of order.

=== Gateway to Apshai (1983) ===
In 1983, Epyx released the action-oriented Gateway to Apshai. It serves as a prequel to Temple of Apshai, as its story is set at a time before the Temple of Apshai was rediscovered. The game consists of 8 levels with 16 dungeons each There are no room descriptions. The game was published on a cartridge, is controlled with the joystick and runs in real time with a focus on fast action. The player character has attributes for strength, agility, luck and health, which are randomly increased each time a dungeon is completed.

=== Temple of Apshai Trilogy (1985) ===
In 1985, Epyx published a remake of Temple of Apshai, featuring new graphics and music, and bundled with both Upper Reaches of Apshai and Curse of Ra on a single disk into the Temple of Apshai Trilogy. The game was redesigned by Stephen Landrum. The trilogy was ported to 16-bit computers by Westwood Studios. These versions feature mouse controls and room descriptions within the game instead of the manual.

=== Cliffs of Tyyr (unreleased) ===
Freeman in BYTE magazine named several titles of Dunjonquest episodes, among them Cliffs of Tyyr. The game was never released.

== Related games ==
=== Starquest ===
After the release of Temple of Apshai, Automated Simulations launched a second line with a science fiction setting and the label Starquest. Only two games in this series were released.

Rescue at Rigel uses a modified version of the same engine as Temple of Apshai, and a hybrid form of room descriptions along with time limited play. The player enters a space station to rescue 10 hostages from insectoid aliens, the Tollah. Hostages get teleported around the station if the player is not fast enough to rescue them, and the overall mission is limited to 50 minutes. Instead of unique descriptions for numbered rooms, the game has multiple rooms labeled "Sanctum", for example, and a detailed description the room types is given in the manual. The role of the fictional backstory character in the manual was filled by "Sudden Smith", and the story dedicated to a number of vintage science fiction heroes, including Buck Rogers, Lazarus Long and the casts of Star Trek and Star Wars.

Star Warrior is closer to a strategy game, although the player still controls only one character. The player takes the role of a "Fury", an assassin who uses highly advanced technology and wears an exoskeleton. The game offers the choice between two maps, each with an individual mission. The first mission is to cause as much destruction as possible, as a distraction to prepare the assassination of a military governor. The second mission is to carry out said assassination. As a first among Dunjonquest and related titles, the game takes place in outdoors areas.

=== Crush, Crumble and Chomp ===
Crush, Crumble and Chomp is a turn-based action game in which the player chooses one of six monsters inspired by famous monster movies (or creates a new one) with individual abilities to cause destruction in one of four cities - New York City, San Francisco, Washington D.C. and Tokyo. The mechanics build upon the same core system as the Dunjonquest games, with semi-real time gameplay and keystroke controls. The program was also still based on the Dunjonquest engine, and was directly adapted from Star Warrior.

== Reception ==
Alan Isabelle reviewed Dunjonquest (specifically, The Temple of Apshai, The Datestones of Ryn, and Morloc's Tower) in The Space Gamer No. 31. Isabelle commented that "These games are quite good, but perhaps overpriced a bit. You're on your own with this one."

== Legacy ==
The Dunjonquest method of listing detailed descriptions of places and events in the manual was adopted by SSI's Goldbox series of official Dungeons & Dragons computer adaptions and Interplay's Wasteland.

The concept of room descriptions in top-down view CRPGs is carried on in titles with limited budgets for voice acting or limited graphics, such as the indie titles of the Avernum series by Spiderweb Software and the Eschalon series by Basilisk Games. Like in the Amiga version of Temple of Apshai, the descriptions are presented in text windows within the game.
