= Temple of Apshai =

1979 video game

- Cover art by Karen Gerving
- Developer: Automated Simulations
- Publisher: Automated Simulations
- Designers: Jon Freeman; Jeff Johnson
- Programmers: Jim Connelley (TRS-80, PET, IBM PC); Michael Farren (Apple); Aric Wilmunder (Atari); Steve Bryson (C64); Stephen Landrum (Trilogy); Louis Castle (Mac)
- Series: Dunjonquest
- Platforms: TRS-80, PET, Apple II, Atari 8-bit, IBM PC, VIC-20, Commodore 64, Atari ST, Amiga, Mac, Amstrad CPC, Thomson TO8
- Release: August 1979
- Genre: Dungeon crawl RPG
- Mode: Single-player

Temple of Apshai is a dungeon crawl role-playing video game developed and published by Automated Simulations (later renamed to Epyx) in 1979. Originating on the TRS-80 and Commodore PET, it was followed by several updated versions for other computers between 1980 and 1986.

Temple of Apshai is considered one of the first graphical role-playing games for home computers, predating even the commercial release of Richard Garriott's Akalabeth: World of Doom. It was an enormous success for its era, selling 400,000 copies by 1986.

It was followed by several sequels and two expansions. The latter were bundled with the main game into the remake Temple of Apshai Trilogy in 1985. Games using the Apshai engine were collectively known as the Dunjonquest series, and later versions of Apshai are sometimes labeled Dunjonquest: Temple of Apshai.

== Gameplay ==
The player in Temple of Apshai assumes the role of an adventurer who explores the mysterious ruins of the Temple of Apshai. The player character investigates room after room of the dungeon crawl while seeking treasure and combatting monsters. Along the way, the player discovers powerful weapons and armor with which to overcome the Temple's inhabitants. The game consists of four dungeons with over 200 rooms in total and features 30 monster types.

Temple of Apshai consists of two programs: the Innkeeper and the Dunjonmaster. The game starts with the Innkeeper and the choice to either generate a new character or input an existing one. The game uses six base values taken from Dungeons & Dragons Early tape versions of the game had no means to save progress. The player was prompted to write down all statistics when quitting the game and had to type them in when resuming play. Later floppy versions fixed this by saving the status on the disk. Weapons and armor are purchased in a shop, where it is possible to haggle with the shopkeeper for a discount. Character stats determine which items can be worn. Finally, the player chooses between four dungeons of increasing difficulty to enter the Dunjonmaster part.

In the Dunjonmaster program, the screen is divided into a bird's-eye view representation of the surroundings and a status summary for the character. Traps, treasures and secret doors are hidden inside the dungeons. Temple of Apshai uses a hybrid between a turn-based and a real time combat system. A player's turn can be used to walk up to 9 steps in the direction the character is facing, turning towards either direction, trying to talk the monster out of the fight, or executing a number of different attacks. A bow and arrows can be used to attack enemies from afar. If the player doesn't make any input for a while, the enemies continue to move and attack in set intervals regardless. All actions decrease the player character's fatigue rating, depending on stats and carrying weight. When this value sinks below zero, the character cannot act anymore before resting. The player gains experience points while adventuring, which raise a number of hidden statistics.

Temple of Apshai was the first computer role-playing game with room descriptions. Detailed descriptions of all the rooms in the game's manual complement the sparse graphics and provide vital information. Pen-and-paper games like Dungeons & Dragons frequently make use of verbal depictions given by dungeon masters to suggest to players what is of interest in a setting. Similarly, in Temple of Apshai the player matches an on-screen room number to its entry in the manual that accompanies the game. One sample entry reads: "The aroma of vanilla makes the senses reel and the floor of the room is covered with the shiny stuff previously observed. Bones lie scattered across the floor and the clicking sound grows fainter from within. Gems stud the south wall." A vanilla scent is used in the game to suggests the presence of Antmen, the dominant monster type in the temple.

When beaten by a monster, the player character may be rescued by one of several non-player characters. Depending on the rescuer, a portion of the player's inventory is removed as payment.

The game has no particular goal other than fighting monsters, collecting treasure and gaining experience points.

== Development and releases ==
The TRS-80 version uses abstract graphics.

Temple of Apshai was originally programmed by Jim Connelley, founder and president of Automated Simulations / Epyx Software, for TRS-80 and Commodore PET, using BASIC. The role-playing system, named Dunjonquest was designed by Jon Freeman, while the level design of the dungeons was provided by Jeff Johnson (Roadwar 2000).

According to Connelley, his motivations to create Temple of Apshai were "the popularity of noncomputer role-playing games" and the opportunity "to create a graphics-oriented adventure game". Like most early computer RPGs, Temple of Apshai was influenced by Dungeons & Dragons. Both Connelley and Freeman played Dungeons & Dragons in a group where Connelley acted as the Dungeon Master. An advertisement for Temple of Apshai called the game a "version of Dungeons and Dragons" and described Connelly as an experienced "Dungeon Master, running continuous D & D campaigns". The game's documentation included instructions for importing pen-and-paper role-playing game player characters.

Temple of Apshai was first released in August 1979. The original release contained the program cassette and the manual in a plastic bag, an unusually professional packaging for the time. Early advertisements promoted versions for TRS-80 and Commodore PET, but a version for the Apple II followed in 1980. The TRS-80, Apple II, and PET versions were sold for $24.95 on cassette and $29.95 on disk.

A port to Atari 8-bit computers was advertised by retailers from winter 1981, while Epyx announced a version for IBM PC compatibles to be released in March 1982. Aric Wilmunder coded the Atari program, while Connelley himself is credited for the IBM PC version. In 1983, the game was released for the VIC-20 and Commodore 64, sold at $39.95. Connelley identified Steve Bryson as the programmer of the Commodore 64 version.

In 1983, Gessler Educational Software distributed a French language version with the title Le Temple D'Apshaï for the purpose of French language education. Both the game and manual were translated entirely, kept in a French Canadian writing style.

in 1984, a Version was made for the Mac Classic under contract with Applied Computer Technology, Inc. located in Las Vegas, Nevada. It was authored by Louis Castle.

== Legacy ==
Later versions have more visual detail.

Temple of Apshai was the first game in Automated Simulations' Dunjonquest series, which span ten individual titles, including expansions, smaller games, and a full sequel, Hellfire Warrior.

Two of the releases, Upper Reaches of Apshai and Curse of Ra, were add-ons to Temple of Apshai which required the original program to run. The level design and room descriptions for both were created by Tim Bird, Mark Madrid and Andrew Martin. Upper Reaches of Apshai contains four new dungeon levels for beginning characters, and conveys a more humorous tone with suburban environments like a vegetable garden and enemies like killer tomatoes. Curse of Ra is set in ancient Egypt and has higher difficulty. It also consists of four dungeon levels, with 179 rooms total.

In 1983, Epyx released the action-oriented Gateway to Apshai, a prequel to Temple of Apshai whose story is set at a time before the Temple of Apshai, where the original game took place, was rediscovered.

In 1985, Epyx published the remake Temple of Apshai Trilogy.

== Reception ==
Temple of Apshai was very successful. Automated Simulations reported that it had sold 20,000 copies of the game by 1981, and 30,000 copies by June 1982. It remained a best-seller for at least four years, with sales reached 400,000 copies by 1986. After the Commodore 64 Version was released in 1983, it appeared on top of the Compute! Gazette list of best-selling Commodore 64 Entertainment programs, generated from surveys with retailers and distributors. It constantly remained among the five best-selling Commodore 64 games according to that list until the column was discontinued after March 1984. The VIC-20 version also appeared on the list of best-selling games for that system from December 1983 onwards. At the middle of June 1983, the wholesale software distributor Softsel International placed Temple of Apshai seventh in a list of best-selling computer games, compiled from sales to 4,000 retail outlets in 50 states and 30 countries. By that time, the game had been in the distributor's top 50 chart for 38 weeks. Temple of Apshai was Epyx's third best-selling Commodore game as of late 1987.

Early reviews of Temple of Apshai praised the game's graphics and unusual complexity, while criticizing long loading times and slow screen build-up for the dungeon graphics. Compute! stated that Temple of Apshai for the PET "is for anyone who is tired of simple 'video games' ... [it] is quite an experience". It advised readers to be aware that "this is a serious game. Be prepared to THINK". Jerry Pournelle in BYTE called it "an excellent real-time dungeon game", and later reported that his sons had "nearly worn out the Dungeons of Apshai". Kilobaud Microcomputing criticized the long load times, but liked the game's graphics and "excellent" documentation. PC Magazine stated that the IBM PC version did not fully exploit the computer's graphics capability, but that players "will find excitement and entertainment ... it's certainly worth the silver to grab this game for the PC". The magazine was also favorable towards Upper Reaches of Apshai, which it called "better than Temple of Apshai in some ways". Popular Science called Temple of Apshai "a good example of a graphic adventure game", but also stated that in it and other games like it "the play seems to drag" because "it takes time to draw the pictures". The Addison-Wesley Book of Atari Software 1984 gave Temple of Apshai an overall B rating, concluding that it was "an excellent game, one that's very involving", and gave the same grade to Hellfire Warrior and Curse of Ra.

Robert Plamondon reviewed Temple of Apshai for Different Worlds magazine and stated that "I found both Datestones of Ryn and Temple of Apshai highly enjoyable. Temple of Apshai is more expensive, but well worth the extra cost because it is so much bigger than Datestones of Ryn."

In 1991 and 1993 Computer Gaming World's Scorpia stated that the graphics "caused a sensation when it first appeared", but also criticized a lack of polish in the programming and slow speed due to the use of BASIC, issues which were improved upon in the Atari 8-bit version. A 2012 overview of TRS-80 games described it as "slow, clunky and crash-prone ... this early attempt at an action role-playing game managed little of either", and inferior to later Atari and Commodore versions, but "quite clearly compelling" as an early dungeon crawl.

Temple of Apshai was awarded the Origins Award for "Best Computer Game of 1980", the first to receive this distinction.
