= Blue Lightning (1989 video game) =

1989 combat flight simulation game

- Cover art
- Developer: Epyx
- Publishers: NA/EU: Atari Corporation; JP: Mumin Corporation
- Producers: John Skruch; Sean Patten
- Designers: RJ Mical; Stephen Jungels
- Programmers: Brian Bowhay; Chuck Sommerville; Stephen H. Landrum
- Artist: Arthur Koch
- Composers: Alex Rudis; Robert Vieira
- Platform: Atari Lynx
- Release: NA: 1989; EU: 1989; JP: December 1, 1989
- Genres: Air combat simulation, shoot 'em up
- Mode: Single-player

Blue Lightning is a 1989 combat flight simulation video game developed by Epyx and published by Atari Corporation in North America and Europe for the Atari Lynx. It was also released in Japan on December 1 of the same year, where it was instead distributed by Mumin Corporation. It was one of the launch titles that were released along with the system in North America and was jointly written by Stephen Landrum, lead programmer Brian Bowhay, who also developed the Lynx hardware and Chip's Challenge creator Chuck Sommerville.

Assuming the role of a chosen rookie aircraft pilot from the United States Air Force by the Flight Command squadron, the player takes control of the titular prototype fighter aircraft in a desperate attempt of The Pentagon to penetrate multiple enemy territories and aid the allies in order to win the war against the enemies. Conceived as a commission to create a pseudo-3D combat flight game by Landrum and graphic artist Arthur Koch, Blue Lightning was heavily inspired by Sega's 1987 Super Scaler arcade game After Burner, in addition of also bearing similarity with the feature film and TV series Blue Thunder.

Upon its release, Blue Lightning was well received by critics who praised the visuals, gameplay and for being a showcase of the capabilities of the Lynx, although some criticized the lack of in-game music and repetitive nature of the missions, with many also comparing it with After Burner. In 1995, a remake developed by Attention to Detail, was released as one of the pack-in games for the Atari Jaguar CD peripheral when it launched and received mixed reviews.

== Gameplay ==
Gameplay screenshot.

Blue Lightning is an arcade-style combat flight simulation game that is played from a third-person perspective similar to After Burner, where the player take the role of a fighter pilot with one main objective; to enter into enemy territory and aid the allies in defeating the enemies to claim victory of the war by completing a series of nine missions, each one taking place in various locations and tasking the player with different assignments, while increasing in difficulty as the game progress further. The game grants the player with a fleet of six Blue Lightning planes, which act as lives and if the current plane is crashed or destroyed, the mission must be restarted from the beginning and the game is over once all lives are lost. The plane also comes equipped with a limited number of missiles to use against enemies but once they run out, the player must rely upon its machine gun to destroy enemy planes.

== Development and release ==
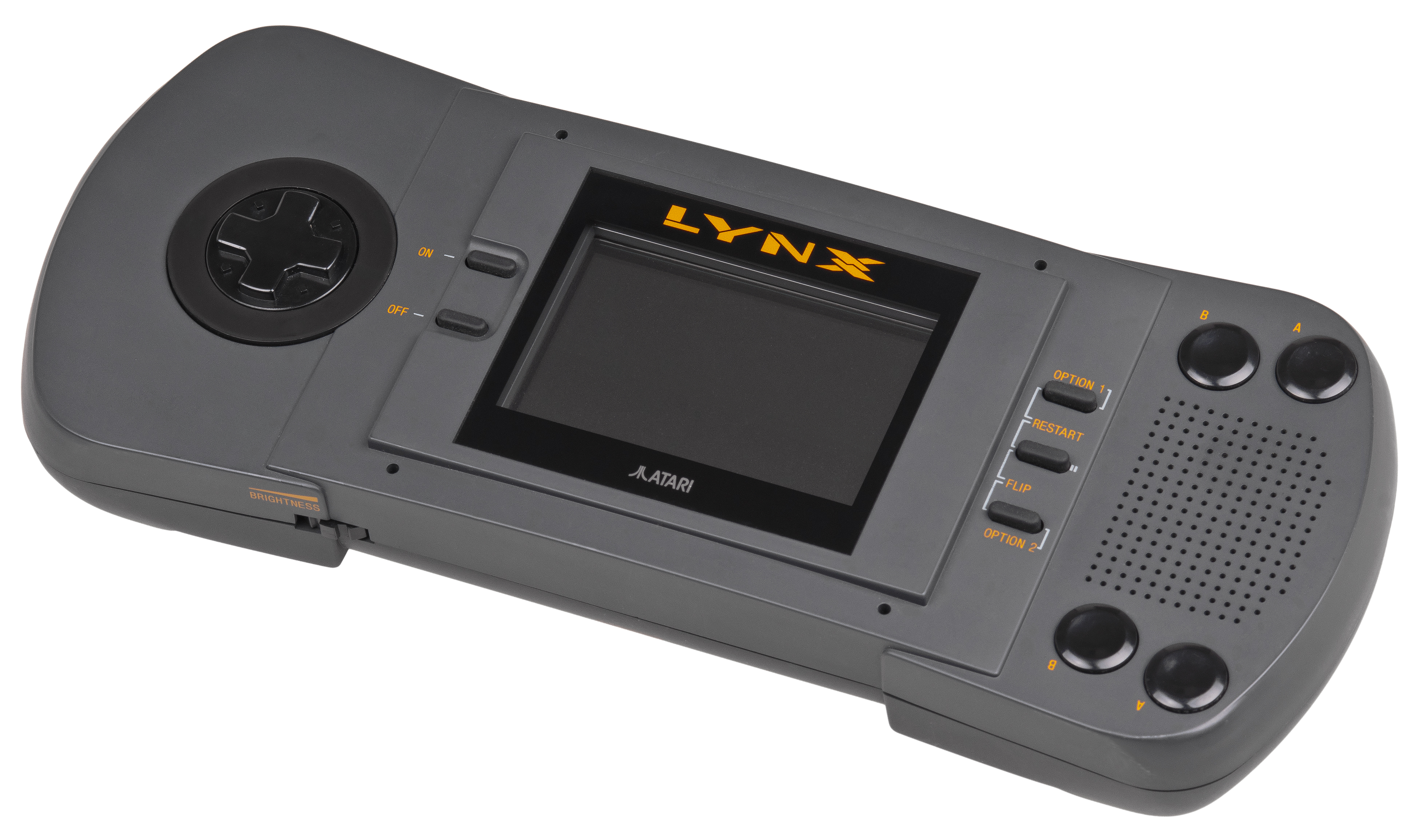
After Burner served as a source of inspiration for Blue Lightning during its development process, which originated as a commission to create a combat flight title for the Atari Lynx.

Blue Lightning was conceived by Arthur Koch and Stephen Landrum as part of a commission to design a pseudo-3D combat flight title for the then-upcoming Handy handheld game console, which would be later rechristened as the Atari Lynx. During their free time, the team would visit local arcades as sources of inspirations for their upcoming projects, among them being Sega's After Burner, which served as a basis for their combat flight game and although Landrum was initially influenced by Spectrum HoloByte's Falcon, Koch lean towards a more arcade-style approach rather than a full simulation one. Koch stated that Landrum's first idea for the project was of a first-person shooter, with the action being viewed on a first-person perspective inside of the plane's cockpit, however he created all the views to be animated at a third-person angle and as a result, Landrum scaled down all of the assets in order to fit within the memory constrains and make it a third-person shooter instead.

Once design of the project was finalized, programmer Chuck Sommerville came up with the title after writing it on a paper, which was likely inspired by the film and TV series Blue Thunder, and gave it to designer RJ Mical, who liked the name. Koch recounted positively about the development process of the title and working with the hardware, stating he and Landrum had a lot of freedom to develop the game they wanted with the available technology, however he also stated that the Lynx's limited screen resolution proved to be a source of difficulty for the team.

Blue Lightning makes heavy use of several features found within the Lynx hardware such as sprite scaling and rotation, with Sommerville developing an animation engine for the introductory sequence of the game, which would later be re-used on other titles for the system such as Electrocop and Todd's Adventures in Slime World. Sommerville stated the game violated a rule of the system imposed by Mical and co-designer Dave Needle, which involved not accessing the ROM image once a game was running, as it streamed data for assets directly from the ROM and this technique would also be re-used in Zarlor Mercenary.

Blue Lightning was one of the original launch titles during the initial release of the Lynx in 1989, along with California Games, the aforementioned Electrocop and Gates of Zendocon. It was also released in Europe around the same time period and later in Japan on December 1 of the same year, where it was distributed by Mumin Corporation instead and the difference between the international and Japanese releases is that the latter came bundled with an instruction manual in Japanese. The game was first showcased to the public during the International Summer Consumer Electronics Show 1989, along with the system. Early previews showcased a different GUI.

== Reception ==
Reception

Review scores
Publication	Score
AllGame	3.5/5
Aktueller Software Markt	10 / 12
Electronic Gaming Monthly	8/10, 7/10, 8/10, 8/10
HobbyConsolas	93 / 100
IGN	9.0 / 10
Joystick	97%
Micromanía	9 / 10
Player One	95%
Amstar	16 / 20
Atari Gaming Headquarters	9 / 10
CVG Mean Machines	66%
The Games Machine	87 / 100
Génération 4	95%
Power Play	75%
ST Action	87%
ST Format	94%

Award
Publication	Award
Electronic Gaming Monthly (1990)	Handheld Game of the Year (Lynx)

Blue Lightning garnered positive reception. In a capsule review of the Lynx version for STart, Clayton Walnum commented, "The 3D perspective is dazzling, with missiles and jets coming at you with such realism, you want to duck. ... The Lynx's built-in scaling features are used to the max in Blue Lightning. Luckily, the gameplay is as good as the graphics, making this a must-have game for every Lynx owner."

In a 1999 retrospective, Robert A Jung reviewed the Atari Lynx version of the game for IGN, stating in his verdict that, "Though the levels could use a little more variety, the user-friendly gameplay and the sensational graphics make this title a blue-ribbon winner."

== Legacy ==
In 1993, Atari requested several Epyx titles in order to be converted and release to the then-upcoming Atari Jaguar, with Blue Lightning among the list of selected titles to be remade. A year later, Blue Lightning 2 was announced for the Jaguar CD and became one of the first titles announced for the then-upcoming add-on, however it was later retitled to its original name during Autumn ECTS '94, where it was revealed that Cybermorph developer Attention to Detail were the ones developing the project. It became one of the two pack-in games for the peripheral when it launched on September 21, 1995, and was met with divisive reception from the public.
