= Gates of Zendocon =

1989 video game

- Cover art in all regions
- Developer: Epyx
- Publishers: NA/EU: Atari Corporation; JP: Mumin Corporation
- Designer: Peter M. Engelbrite
- Programmer: Peter M. Engelbrite
- Artists: Peter M. Engelbrite; Matthew Crysdale; Arthur Koch
- Composers: Robert Vieira; Alex Rudis
- Platform: Atari Lynx
- Release: NA: 1989; EU: 1989; JP: 23 December 1989
- Genre: Scrolling shooter
- Mode: Single-player

Gates of Zendocon is a 1989 horizontally scrolling shooter video game developed by Epyx and published by Atari Corporation for the Atari Lynx. One of the first games written for the platform, it was one of the launch titles that were released along with the system in North America.

In the game, the eponymous evil spider has trapped the player's space fighter in his web of universes, which are interconnected by a series of teleportation gates and riddled with alien bases, with the primary objective of finding and defeating him while recruiting friendly allies along the way. Programmed by Todd's Adventures in Slime World author Peter Engelbrite, Gates of Zendocon began its development prior to the existence of functional Lynx hardware.

Gates of Zendocon received positive reception from critics after its initial release, with praise towards the presentation, originality and gameplay but the sound department received criticism. An updated conversion for the Atari Jaguar was planned but never went into full production due to a lack of internal interest.

== Gameplay ==
Gameplay screenshot

Gates of Zendocon is a horizontally scrolling shoot 'em up game where the player take control of an unnamed space fighter craft across 51 non-linear levels ("universes"), with the main objective being finding and defeating the evil spider Zendocon by passing through teleportation gates to do so, while battling against an assortment of Zendocon's army. During gameplay, there are a number of friendly alien allies who were slaved by Zendocon that aid the player in their journey and protect the ship. Most of the levels are riddled with enemies and if the player's ship is hit by an enemy or projectile, it will reflect the amount of damage taken as a result: it can lose the laser tip and the engine before the last hit that will obliterate the player's ship. In addition, there is a hidden level inside the game where the player can earn high scores by destroying the faces of the game's creators.

== Development ==
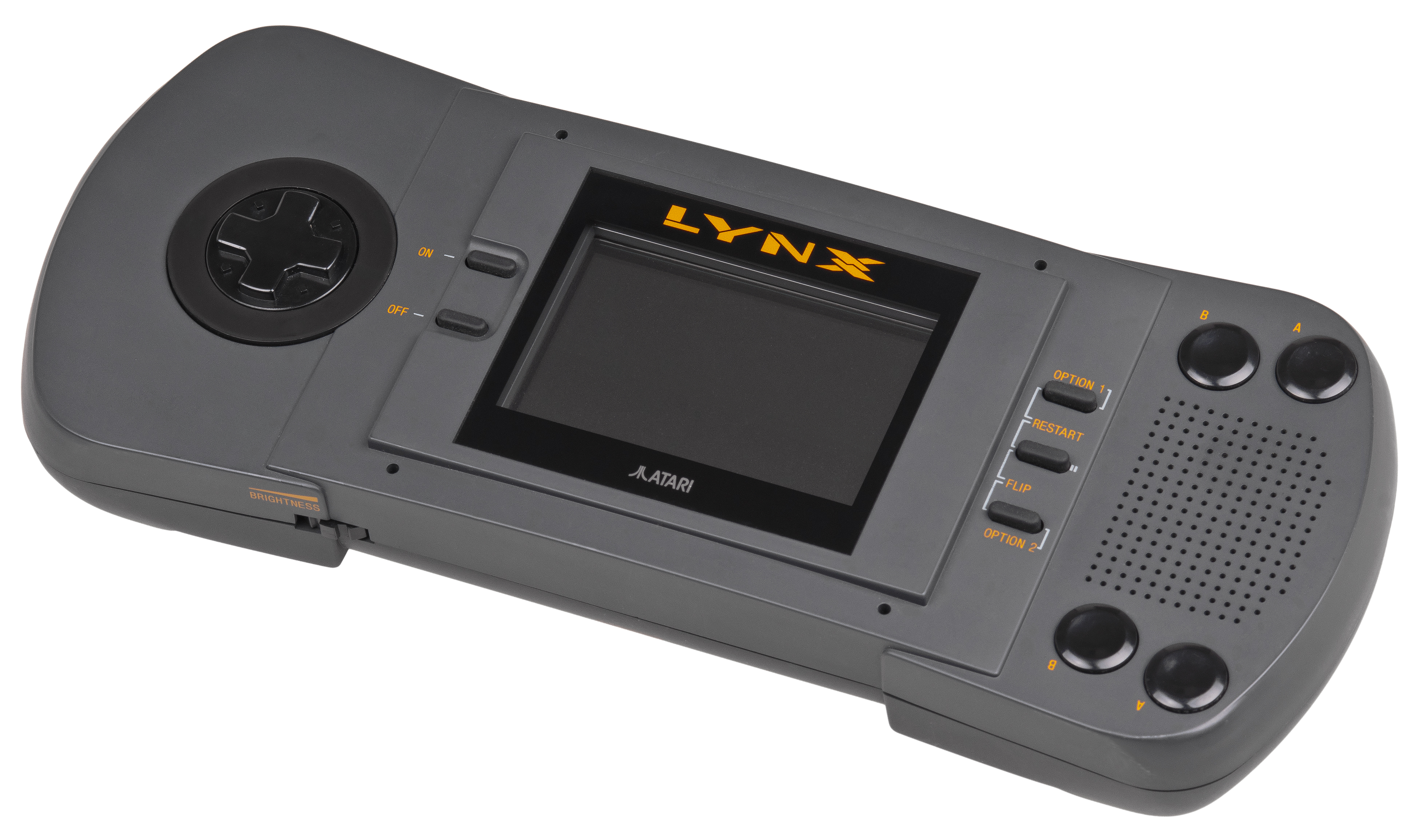
Gates of Zendocon started its development before any Atari Lynx hardware existed.

Gates of Zendocon was written by Peter Engelbrite when he worked at Epyx as games developer and programmer. He also worked on Atari 2600 conversion of other titles from the company such as California Games, Summer Games and Winter Games. In an online interview with website The Atari Times, Engelbrite recounted about the development process of the game, stating that work on the project began before functional Atari Lynx hardware existed and wrote an emulator of the console on the Apple II 8-bit microcomputer, setting up the system's graphical data structures but displaying the sprites as ASCII text.

Later during development, an early revision of the Lynx capable of displaying raster graphics was made, with the game running for the first time on actual hardware, albeit at a slow frame rate. Atari composer Alex Rudis was also involved during the production of the project, recalling the process of the developer's pictures in the hidden level on another interview with The Atari Times, which involved using a video camera to scan the image with Dave Needle and other team members freezing the images in order to be clear, while Rudis rotated his portrait as the scanning occurred to make it look distorted. Electronic Gaming Monthly also revealed that other members were involved in its production, among them being Lynx co-inventor RJ Mical, although their roles were not specified.

== Release ==
Gates of Zendocon was one of the launch titles during the initial release of the Lynx in 1989 along with California Games, Blue Lightning, and Electrocop. It was also released in Europe around the same time period and later in Japan on December 23 of the same year, where it was distributed by Mumin Corporation instead and the difference between the international and Japanese releases is that the latter came bundled with an instruction manual in Japanese. The game was first showcased to the public during the International Summer Consumer Electronics Show 1989, along with the system.

== Reception ==
Reception

Review scores
Publication	Score
AllGame	2.5/5
IGN	7.0 / 10
Aktueller Software Markt	6 / 12
Amstar	12 / 20
CVG Mean Machines	84%
The Games Machine	92 / 100
Génération 4	90%
Hobby Consolas	86 / 100
Joystick	86% 76%
Micromanía	6 / 10
Player One	75%
Power Play	73%
Zero	90 / 100

Gates of Zendocon garnered positive reception. In a review for STart, Clayton Walnum called the game "the obligatory, horizontally-scrolling, outer-space shoot-em-up", and said it would only appeal to fans of the genre due to its limited depth and weak use of the Lynx hardware. Robert A. Jung also reviewed the game which was published to IGN. He noted that "Underneath the average graphics and average sound is a well-rounded, pretty diverse action game" and called it "a good buy". Giving a final score of 7 out of 10.

== Legacy ==
In 1993, Atari requested several Epyx titles in order to be converted and release to the then-upcoming Atari Jaguar, with Gates of Zendocon among the list of selected titles. After Bethesda Softworks' Protector was cancelled in 1995, Atari suggested to use its engine in a proposed update of Gates of Zendocon for the system. However, Bethesda then-president Christopher Weaver rejected the offer.
