= Electrocop =

1989 video game

- Cover art
- Developer: Epyx
- Publishers: NA/EU: Atari Corporation; JP: Mumin Corporation
- Producer: Greg Omi
- Designers: Chuck Sommerville; Charlie Kellner; RJ Mical; Tom Schumacher
- Artists: Arthur Koch; Karen Mangum; Matthew Crysdale
- Composers: Alex Rudis; Robert Vieira
- Platform: Atari Lynx
- Release: NA: 1989; EU: 1989; JP: 25 November 1989
- Genres: Action, third-person shooter
- Mode: Single-player

Electrocop is a 1989 action video game developed by Epyx and published by Atari Corporation for the Atari Lynx. One of the first games written for the platform, it was among the launch titles that were released along with the system in North America.

Set on a futuristic interpretation of Washington, D.C. in the year 2069, players assume the role of the titular robot created by MegaCorp who must infiltrate the Steel Complex fortress and attempt to rescue the President of the United States' first daughter under a time limit from the Criminal Brain. Conceived by Greg Omi, who developed the Lynx hardware alongside Chip's Challenge creator Chuck Sommerville, Electrocop began its development prior to the existence of any functional Lynx hardware.

Electrocop received mixed reception from critics, who unanimously praised the pseudo-3D visuals and sound department, but some criticized the repetitive nature of the gameplay and convoluted graphics. A version of the game was developed and completed by ICC for the Atari 7800, but never released.

== Gameplay ==
Gameplay screenshot

Electrocop is a third-person shooter game in which players starts off with a time limit of one hour to complete the task of rescuing the president's daughter. The player must make their way through different levels and deal with various foes. These foes are robots named, Walker, Python, Mine, Wall Cannon, Virus and Stringray. To get between each level, players must use a computer interface to hack through different doors. While in this interface, there are directories of Information where more can be learned about the robots, Programs that disable the robots and help hack with codes, and Games where players can pass the time by playing minigames titled Meteors, Letter Puzzle and Out Break. There is a Med-pack which heals the player, and weapon repair that fixes any damaged weapons. There are different weapons to choose from to help the player fight throughout the game.

== Development and release ==
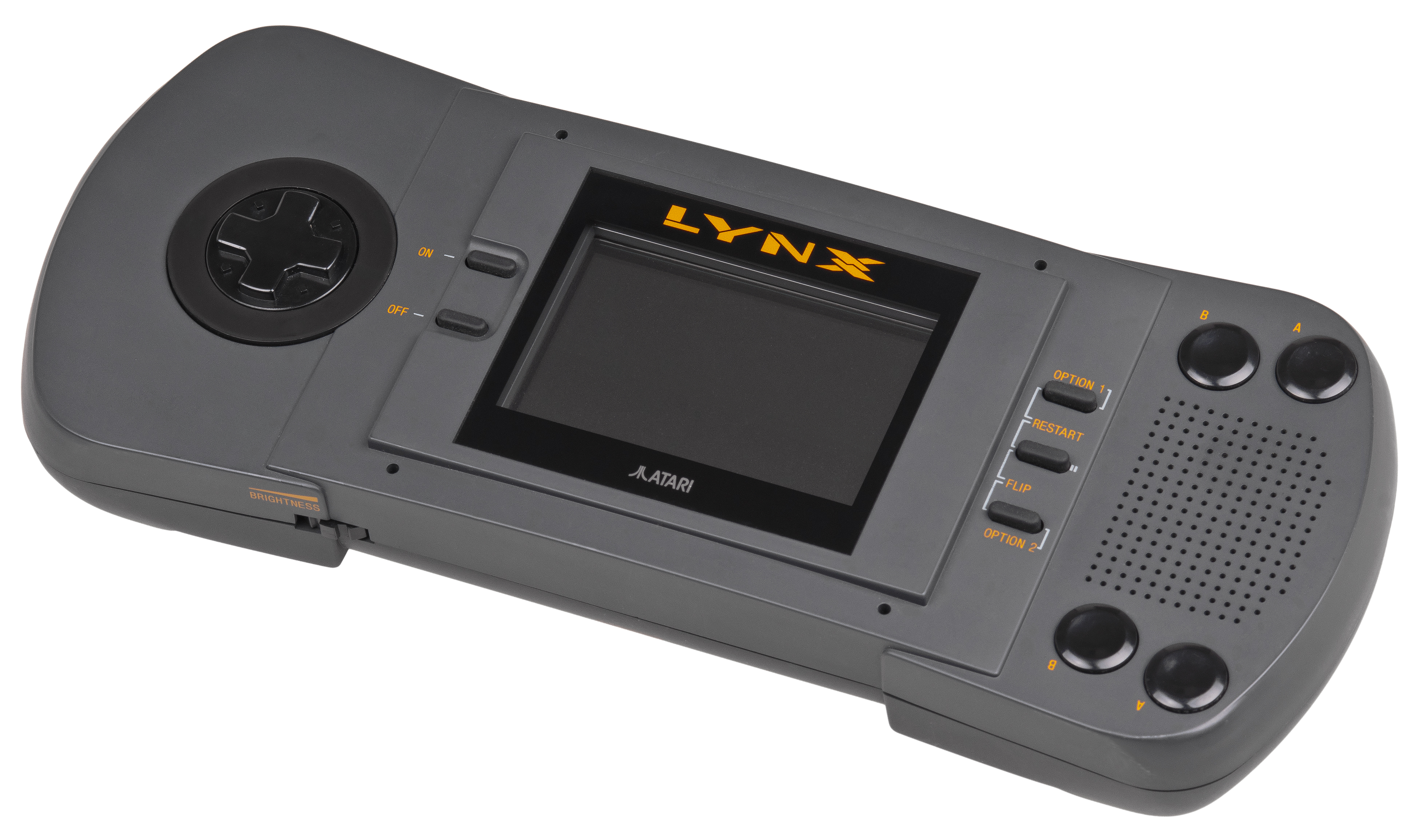
Electrocop began development prior to the existence of any functional Lynx hardware.

Electrocop was conceived by Greg Omi when he worked at Epyx as games developer and programmer alongside Chuck Sommerville. In an online interview with website The Atari Times, Omi recounted the development process of the game, saying work on the project began before any functional Lynx hardware existed. The team were working on an emulator of the console on the Amiga microcomputer at a slow frame rate, in addition of also using a video camera to scan the image in order to test how the graphics would look once the hardware was finalized. However, an early revision of the Lynx capable of displaying raster graphics was made later during development. Omi also stated that he initially lacked knowledge of 3D computer graphics and matrices, as he needed a graphical perspective for his project and consulted Blue Lightning programmer Stephen Landrum in how to write it, since the system could not perform sprite rotation.

A long-running rumor was that Electrocop originally started as a 3D sequel to Dennis Caswell's Impossible Mission. However, when asked about this rumor, Omi said "it's funny, but I can't remember if it was supposed to be a sequel to Impossible Mission or not. I remember writing a story and basic game design and pitching it to RJ [Mical], but I don't remember if they were asking for a sequel." Despite being a fan of Impossible Mission and knowing Caswell personally, Omi could not recall if he was still a member of Epyx. Atari composer Alex Rudis was also involved during the production of the project and created the music for it. The introductory sequence was created by Sommerville, who developed an animation engine that would be re-used on other titles for the hardware such as Blue Lightning and Todd's Adventures in Slime World, in addition of the minigame sequences.

Electrocop was one of the launch titles for the Lynx in 1989, along with Blue Lightning, California Games, and Gates of Zendocon. It was also released in Europe around that time period and later in Japan on December 23 of the same year, where it was distributed by Mumin Corporation instead. The difference between the international and Japanese releases was that the latter came bundled with an instruction manual in Japanese. The game was first showcased to the public during the International Summer Consumer Electronics Show 1989 along with the system, though early previews showed the title under the earlier name Net Runner.

=== Atari 7800 version ===
Level artwork from the unreleased Atari 7800 version of Electrocop by Hennig before being transposed to pixel art graphics

A version of Electrocop was in development by ICC for Atari Corporation on the Atari 7800, focusing on action and platforming instead of the third-person shooter gameplay style from the original Lynx version and was also showcased during an exhibition at the Consumer Electronics Show in a complete state. The 7800 version is notable for being one of the first titles where director and writer Amy Hennig was involved, creating the artwork using Atari ST and Macintosh computers as a freelancer. However, despite Hennig stating that work on the project was completed, this version would never be released due to Atari cancelling its release late during the official life span of the system. In a 2007 forum post at AtariAge, former MicroProse UK employee Steve Goss revealed artwork of the cancelled conversion that was given to him by Hennig herself.

== Reception ==
Reception

Review scores
Publication	Score
AllGame	2.5/5
IGN	7.0 / 10
Aktueller Software Markt	10 / 12
Amstar	13 / 20
CVG Mean Machines	90%
The Games Machine	79 / 100
Génération 4	75%
Hobby Consolas	84 / 100; 86 / 100
Interface	58 / 100
Joystick	80% 78%
Micromanía	7 / 10
Play Time	69%
Power Play	38%
Superjuegos	59 / 100
Zero	86 / 100

Electrocop garnered mixed reception. In a capsule review for STart, Clayton Walnum praised the game's graphics and variety of challenges. Robert A. Jung reviewed the game which was published to IGN Entertainment. In his final verdict he said "This cart was a brilliant concept that didn't completely click; the race against the clock and the real-time exploration/combat elements are hampered with uninspired gameplay and little variety. Electrocop's stunning visuals and sounds make it fun to watch, but whether you'd buy a game for its razzle-dazzle is a personal decision." Giving a final score of 7 out of 10.

== Legacy ==
Greg Omi has stated that no sequel was ever planned. In 1993, Atari Corporation requested several Epyx games for conversion and release for the upcoming Jaguar, including Electrocop. Development on a Jaguar version was never started.
