= Terminator 2 (computer game) =

1991 video game

Terminator 2: Judgment Day
- Developer: Dementia
- Publisher: Ocean Software
- Programmers: Bobby Earle (C64); Gary Priest (Spectrum)
- Composer: Jonathan Dunn
- Series: Terminator
- Platforms: Amiga; Amstrad CPC; Atari ST; Commodore 64; MS-DOS; ZX Spectrum
- Release: EU: 1991
- Genre: Action
- Mode: Single-player

Terminator 2: Judgment Day is an action video game developed by Dementia and published in 1991 by Ocean Software under license from Acclaim Entertainment. It is based on the 1991 film of the same name and was released in Europe for Amiga, Amstrad CPC, Atari ST, Commodore 64, MS-DOS, and ZX Spectrum. It is a sequel to The Terminator based on the 1984 film of the same name. The game involves driving, fighting, and puzzle-solving.

Terminator 2: Judgment Day was well received for its graphics, gameplay variety, and sound. However, critics also considered the game to be average or disappointing, with some criticizing it for a lack of originality and its difficult gameplay.

== Gameplay ==
Terminator 2: Judgment Day is based on the film of the same name, in which two Terminator machine models, the T-800 (Note: Referred to as a "T101" in the Amstrad CPC and ZX Spectrum versions.) and the T-1000, are sent back from the future. The T-800 is tasked with protecting a boy named John Connor, who will eventually become the leader of the human resistance in a war against machines. The T-1000 has been sent back with an order to kill young John, ensuring the rise of the machines. In the game, the player largely takes the role of the T-800. John's mother, Sarah Connor, is also playable in certain levels.

The levels are based on prominent scenes from the film, including one in which the T-1000 drives a truck through a flood control channel, in pursuit of the T-800 and John, who are riding on a motorcycle. Other scenes recreated in the game include Sarah's escape from a mental hospital, a sabotage of Cyberdyne Systems' headquarters, and a showdown between the Terminators in a steel mill. Digitized images from the film appear in between levels to advance the story.

Each level features one of several gameplay styles, such as beat 'em up fighting between the two Terminators, or vertically scrolling driving sequences in which characters flee from the T-1000. Sarah's hospital escape is played as a side-scrolling level. Other levels are played as a sliding puzzle game in which the player must perform repairs on the T-800; successfully completing these levels will increase the player's health for the next level, but winning the puzzle game is not necessary to progress forward.

The ZX Spectrum version has seven levels, while the Amiga and Atari ST versions have eight. The C64 version has nine levels. The ZX Spectrum version does not include the digitized film images.

== Development and release ==
Terminator 2: Judgment Day was developed by Dementia, a game development group based in Wolverhampton, England. The game was published by Ocean Software. Ocean secured the rights to a video game adaptation of the film while it was in the post-production phase. Kevin Bulmer and Richard Costello, the heads of Dementia, had met with Ocean to seek funding for a potential role-playing video game. Ocean manager Gary Bracey was impressed with their proposal but wanted them to develop a Terminator 2 video game first. Ocean had been impressed by Dementia's previous game, titled Corporation. Although Bulmer was a Terminator fan, he was initially hesitant to accept the offer, later saying that Dementia already had other projects planned and that "there's less money to be made out of doing conversion work than original games." In January 1991, Bracey gave Bulmer a copy of the Terminator 2 film script. After reading it, Bulmer gained an immediate interest in developing a video game adaptation. Ocean wanted the game to be completed within six months. Dementia picked scenes from the script to form the game's levels.

Within two weeks of accepting the development job, Bulmer submitted 20 sheets of Terminator 2 game designs. Initially, two gameplay ideas were briefly considered: a 3D shoot 'em up viewed from a first-person perspective; and an interactive adventure game. Both ideas were scrapped due to the limited development period. Another early idea would involve the T-800 fighting its way from a rebel base to an enemy area in order to use a time machine and travel back through time. Bulmer spent three days working on this idea, which would have been played as a shoot 'em up, but Ocean rejected the idea because it did not follow the plot of the film. Shortly thereafter, Bulmer devised the idea to use various gameplay styles, as used in the final version of the game. At the time, Bulmer had never played Ocean games such as RoboCop 2 and Total Recall, both of which used the same mix of gameplay styles. Bulmer said he was initially unaware that such a mix had already been used in previous games. Bulmer later played the two games, as well as Ocean's Batman game. Bulmer disliked the three games and said that they "made us more determined to make Terminator 2 a better, more playable, series of ideas." The developers had difficulty in deciding how the fight levels should end, as the Terminator characters are depicted in the film as being nearly invincible. Bulmer said, "Nobody really wins or loses, so how do you translate that into a game?" Bulmer explained that the solution involved making the T-800 and the T-1000 susceptible to damage.

Because of secrecy surrounding the film, Dementia was initially limited to using just the script as a reference for the game. Bulmer said he ultimately made some mistakes with the game adaptation, parts of which do not accurately reflect what happened in the film. When a trailer for the film was released in March 1991, it gave the developers a better idea of the film's tone. They also took frames from the trailer and digitized them for inclusion in the game. Bulmer and Costello were distraught when they realized that each frame was 240 kilobytes in size. Because the rest of the game was already 400 kilobytes, there was a need to reduce the memory constraint; this was achieved by reducing each frame to a quarter of its original size. The digitized film images had to be removed from the ZX Spectrum version because of lack of memory space. One of the puzzle levels depicts the T-800's arm as the player tries to repair it, similar to a scene in the first Terminator film. To create the level's appearance, an image was taken of Bulmer's arm and was subsequently digitized. A sliding puzzle was then overlaid near the wrist area. Another digitized shot was created out of an image that Bulmer took of his hand-painted T-800 endoskeleton model.

Bulmer had been disappointed in earlier games based on Arnold Schwarzenegger films, as they depicted Schwarzenegger's character as a small sprite. For the Terminator 2 game, Bulmer designed Schwarzenegger's T-800 character and others to be larger than most games; this took up more memory than it would have otherwise and also presented programming issues, but Bulmer believed the result was worth it. The characters each have approximately 93 frames of animation. As with some film-based games, Ocean was prohibited from using an obvious likeness from any of the film actors, so their game counterparts had to be designed in a way that would only vaguely resemble the actors. Shortly before the game's release, it was reported that Bulmer's house was robbed, and among what was stolen was some of his work for Terminator 2. While Ocean had backups of the data, several days worth of the game's development was lost.

Terminator 2: Judgment Day was released exclusively in Europe for Amiga, Amstrad CPC, Atari ST, Commodore 64 (C64), DOS, and ZX Spectrum. The ZX Spectrum version was released in August 1991, coinciding with the U.K. theatrical release of the film, followed by the C64 version in October. The other versions were released by the end of 1991. By November 1992, The Hit Squad had published a budget-priced re-release of the game for Amiga and C64. A budget re-release also occurred for the ZX Spectrum version.

== Reception ==
Reception

Review scores
| Publication | Score |
|---|---|
| Crash | 88% (ZX Spectrum) |
| Sinclair User | 84% (ZX Spectrum) |
| Your Sinclair | 88/100 (ZX Spectrum) |
| Zzap!64 | 89% (C64) |
| Amiga Action | 79% (Amiga) |
| Amiga Computing | 40% (Amiga) |
| Amiga Format | 60% (Amiga) |
| Amiga Joker | 64% (Amiga) |
| Amiga Power | 65% (Amiga) |
| Atari ST User | 35% (Atari ST) |
| Commodore Format | 78% (C64) |
| CU Amiga | 69% (Amiga) |
| Micro Hobby | 93% (ZX Spectrum) |
| New Computer Express | 2/5 (C64) |
| Retro Gamer | 14% (Amiga/Atari ST; 2004) |
| ST Format | 63% (Atari ST) |
| Your Commodore | 94% (C64) |
| Zero | 68% (Amiga/Atari ST) |

Terminator 2: Judgment Day received praise for its graphics, especially its character sprites. The digitized scenes in between levels also received some praise, as well as criticism. Some critics also praised the gameplay variety, as well as the sound.

However, critics also considered the game average or disappointing. Frank Bartucca Jr. of Amiga Format wrote, "What promised to be a game that you will never forget, turns out to be a glossily-packaged game you will try not to remember and probably regret buying." Adam Waring of ST Format stated that the game "follows scenes from the film quite closely, but isn't much fun to play." Colin Campbell of Amiga Power called it, "A typical movie licence in just about every sense. It follows the plot closely, gives you a lot of sub games for your money, even provides a few digitised animations," but also wrote, "There really isn't much in the way of worthwhile gameplay in here." Atari ST User called it, "Yet another great movie turned into a repetitive and dull spin-off." The magazine wrote that the game "feels like it was cobbled together in 10 minutes to coincide with the movie. Take little bits of RoboCop 2, Total Recall and the even more abysmal DarkMan and change the sprites, and you've got Terminator 2." David Wilson of Zero criticized the gameplay and considered the game a "huge disappointment." Despite praising the variety, Ian Watson of Sinclair User felt the game could have been better.

Other critics were more positive of the game. Jeff Davy of Your Commodore stated that Terminator 2 "clocks in as one of the best 'game-of-the-film' adaptations" available for the C64, further writing, "No game can capture the film's atmosphere and power but this'll go a fair way." Stuart Wynne of Zzap!64 called it a "huge and professionally executed movie tie-in, rarely brilliant but always competent". Nick Roberts of Crash criticized the levels for being repetitive, but otherwise enjoyed the game and called it "a great conversion" of the film.

Some reviewers were critical of the game's lack of originality. Commodore Format wrote, "The movie boasts more innovative ideas and stunning visuals than anything else on the planet, and we get a game put together with tried and trusted gameplay. Nice and safe, nothing too risky: a bit of Total Recall here, a hint of Batman there, and those flippin' tile-sliding puzzle sections." Steve Merrett of CU Amiga called the gameplay styles "simplistic and dull". Merrett stated, "In comparison to the brilliant film, no matter how hot the game, it's still going to come across as a slight disappointment. However, ignoring any comparisons, the game still isn't all it could be." Bartucca was critical of the gameplay but praised the puzzle levels for providing "a nice change from the mindless violence."

Some criticized the difficulty. Stuart Campbell of New Computer Express wrote that the game "has been set at a severe level of toughness, undoubtedly as a cheapskate way to provide it with some degree of addictiveness." Amiga Computing considered the game too short.

In the United Kingdom, Terminator 2 was the third best-selling game during the Christmas season of 1991. In 2004, Aaron Birch of Retro Gamer reviewed the game and criticized its levels, especially the puzzle games, writing that the latter seemed out of place. Birch concluded, "How Ocean could take one of the most promising gaming licences ever and turn out such filth is an achievement in itself."

=== Re-release ===
Reception

Review scores
| Publication | Score |
|---|---|
| Sinclair User | 79% (ZX Spectrum) |
| Your Sinclair | 46% (ZX Spectrum) |
| Amiga Action | 38% Amiga) |
| Amiga Computing | 60% (Amiga) |
| Amiga Format | 69% (Amiga) |
| Amiga Power | 30% (Amiga) |
| Commodore Format | 72% (C64) |
| CU Amiga | 34% (Amiga) |
| The One Amiga | 39% (Amiga) |

The game's budget re-release was criticized. Simon Byrne of The One Amiga disliked the gameplay and wrote that "this is a really disappointing game which could have been the conversion to end them all." Tony Kaye of Sinclair User praised the graphics but was critical of the gameplay. Commodore Format praised the music, the character sprites, and the digitized scenes. Jonathan Davies of Amiga Power praised the digitized scenes and stated they were the only good aspect of the game. He criticized the levels for their similarities to each other.

Your Sinclair praised the puzzle aspect but wrote that "two good levels out of seven doesn't really make much of a game." Amiga Force criticized the graphics, sound, and gameplay, while writing that the "stunning" digitized sequences "can't compensate for a poor game." The magazine also considered the game too tedious and difficult. Amiga Action wrote that the game varies between being "ridiculously easy" and "stupidly difficult."
