= Chronicles of the Sword =

1996 video game

- North American Windows box art
- Developer: Synthetic Dimensions
- Publisher: Psygnosis
- Producers: Craig Foster; Bill Allen
- Designer: Kevin Bulmer
- Programmer: John Wildsmith
- Artists: Nigel Bunegar; Matthew Stott; Ben Clark
- Writers: Kate Copestake; Dave Minto
- Composer: Ben Daglish
- Platforms: Windows, PlayStation
- Release: Windows: NA: June 1996; EU: 1996; PlayStation: NA: 12 November 1996; EU: 27 November 1996
- Genre: Adventure
- Mode: Single-player

Chronicles of the Sword is a 1996 adventure game developed by Synthetic Dimensions and published by Psygnosis for Windows and PlayStation. The game, originally titled King Arthur: The Quest of The Fair Unknown, is based on Arthurian legends and uses a point-and-click interface. Chronicles of the Sword tells the story of the young knight Gawain on a quest to save Camelot from the scheming witch queen Morgana. It has received largely negative reviews.

== Gameplay ==
Chronicles of the Sword is a third-person, mouse-based point-and-click graphic adventure game, featuring sprite-based characters in 3D pre-rendered environments with switching viewpoints (described as similar to Alone in the Dark). The game's user interface uses a context-sensitive cursor for movement and actions, and a classic adventure conversation system based on choosing dialogue options. It also includes a few action game elements in the form of simple combat sequences that are interactive only on the Regular difficulty level and are automated (shown as cutscenes) on the Easy setting.

== Plot ==
=== Setting ===
The sword and sorcery story is set in Albion, Sub-Roman Britain, circa 420. The player assumes the role of Gawain, a young apprentice knight about to be ordained by King Arthur and struggling to uphold virtues of his peaceful and prosperous kingdom. Gawain is ordered by Merlin to seek out and vanquish Queen Morgana, Arthur's half-sister and evil sorceress, before she can destroy Arthur and seize the throne of Albion.

=== Story ===
The game begins with Morgana cruelly murdering the court priest of King Arthur's castle of Camelot, located just as Gawain was about to be given his knighthood. She plots to reveal Sir Lancelot Du Lac and Lady Guinevere's affair to the world, which would help her overthrow Arthur and take over. The court wizard Merlin has discovered her nefarious plans, and the unknowing Gawain is used by Merlin to force Morgana into appearing before the king. Morgana is tried for treason and sentenced to be banished from the kingdom, but she then openly declares war on him and uses her supernatural powers to kill the guards and vanish. After Morgana's later attempts to assassinate Arthur is thwarted by Merlin, the king finally decides she needs to be stopped once and for all, and orders her to be found and put to death. Merlin then handpicks Gawain to be instrument of Morgana's destruction.

The young knight ventures to ferret out various objects for the creation of a special ring that would grant him an immunity from Morgana's black magic, who knows of his mission and will try to eliminate him. With the ring on, Gawain finally goes off on the journey to rid the world of Morgana, who has hidden in a forbidding fortress on the island of Lyonesse. On the way there, Morgana shows up to kill Gawain's companion, her former servant named Helie. Once in Morgana's castle, Gawain gets captured and is sentenced to death, but manages to escape after defeating a giant snake. He then works to overcome Morgana and slay her vampire bodyguard Ragnar. Ultimately, Gawain is unable to end Morgana's life, but the witch's own Faerie minions help him imprison her inside Lyonesse. She swears vengeance while he returns to Camelot as a hero to join the Order of the Round Table.

=== Characters ===
- Gawain - The player character, eldest son of King Lot and Arthur's sister Morgause. Gawain arrived at Camelot just the previous night before the start of the game, after having been nominated by Sir Lancelot to become a knight of King Arthur's Round Table. Later, Merlin order him to carry out the execution of Morgana using all means at his disposal. Gawain is chosen for this task precisely due to his youth and lack of experience, for Merlin hopes it will confuse and flatter the vain Morgana.
- Queen Morgana - The game's main antagonist, Morgana is King Arthur's immoral half-sister who constantly conspires against him and desires to be the ruler of all Albion. She is a witch of great dark power who once learnt much of her sorcery from Merlin himself, but now she and Merlin are bitter rivals and their past intimacy means nothing to them. Morgana has made many attempts on Arthur's life and is rumoured to be behind many mysterious deaths and disappearances, but never has left any trace of her involvement. A lascivious femme fatale of great beauty, Morgana is a master of intrigue and deception, and even without her magical powers she would make a dangerous adversary. Like Merlin, Morgana is semi-immortal, which requires Gawain to magically trap her soul in order to defeat her.
- Merlin (Merrdyn) - Merlin is a powerful warlock who is several hundred years old and may have been born in Atlantis. Merlin has been an influential figure for a very long time, working towards a greater goal known to no-one but himself. He was advisor to Vortigern, the last great king of Britain. When Ambrosius Aurelianus and Uther Pendragon killed Vortigen and stole his throne, Merlin appeared to change his allegiance and support Ambrosius until his death, and then Uther when he succeeded him. It is rumoured that he and Morgana had a short, explosive affair, but now they are sworn enemies. Merlin is hard drinking and often is callous when dealing with other people.
- King Arthur (Arthus) - Arthur is noble king of Britain, cultivating the ideal of the chivalrous knight operating under an honourable code of conduct. He started the fellowship of the Round Table after drawing the sword from the stone, thereby fulfilling a prophecy and proving his right to rule. Years ago, Merlin informed Arthur that once he was tricked into going to bed with Morgana, disguised by a spell, and the issue of their union was to be the instrument of Arthur's death. Arthur loves his wife, Guinevere dearly, but projects onto her an ideal which she cannot possibly live up to.
- Queen Guinevere - Guinevere, the King's wife, is a beautiful young queen who dresses and walks in a way which would tempt most men at court. She enjoys flirting with young knights, a habit the King finds irritating. Lady Guinevere is intelligent but too young and inexperienced to offer Arthur help and be a confidant. Morgana wants to use her romance with Lancelot in her plot against Arhur.
- Ragnar - Ragnar is a sadistic Saxon vampire based at Lyonesse. He is entirely devoted to Morgana, despises mortals, and is very difficult to destroy.

== Development ==
The game has been originally being developed by Synthetic Dimensions (then functioning under the name of DCD, or Dimension Creative Design) as King Arthur: The Quest of The Fair Unknown. The development team boasted of having spent a full year researching for a preparatory work into the production. According to Synthetic Dimensions, they have discovered "that there are few known facts, but plenty of mismatched half-truths, so the game sets out to detail a hitherto unheard part of the story." In a mid-1994 version of the game, as shown to the Edge magazine, the player character was the titular Fair Unknown (Gingalain), sent to a Welsh castle to rescue a queen. Upon reaching the castle, the player had to battle various enemies, including a giant serpent (here with a backstory related to the Questing Beast), a pair of mages, and a few undead skeletons (sword fights against an enormous snake and the skeletons are actually featured in the final version, towards the end of the game in Morgana's castle). This initial mission completed, the player would then return to Camelot, "where the real meat of the game begins" (Chronicles of the Sword begins already in Camelot), and the game would also feature Merlin and Morgana.

The version publicly shown at the ECTS '95 was titled Chronicles of the Sword. The game was advertised as using professional voice actors, but their names were not publicly disclosed. It was created using PCs and Amiga computers and Imagine and 3D Studio Max rendering programs (the graphics were first created using the palette of 16.7 million colors, before being downscaled down to only 256 colors), as well as many other techniques, "including full-motion video, stop-motion animation, model making, make-up, rendering, pain, and hand animating."

== Release ==
Chronicles of the Sword was supposed to be released already in November or December 1994, only for the PC Windows platform and on just one CD-ROM. The final game is contained on two discs and was released on February 23, 1996 in North America and on May 31, 1996 in Europe. It was also the second Psygnosis-published game that was based on Arthurian themes, the first being The Legend of Galahad. It was also re-released in 1998.

Chronicles of the Sword was ported for the PlayStation because of the ownership of Psygnosis by Sony, and released in June 1996 in Europe and in November 1996 in North America. To promote the game, Sony run win-a-PlayStation contests in some magazines including Hobby Consolas.

== Reception ==
Reception

Aggregate score
Aggregator	Score
GameRankings	41% (PC)

Review scores
Publication	Score
AllGame	1/5
Game Informer	2/10
GameSpot	4.2/10
PC Gamer (UK)	65%
PC Zone	68% (1996); 56% (1998)
Computer Games Magazine	1/5
Computer Player	6/10
Entertainment Weekly	D
Just Adventure	C
NowGamer	4.3/10
PC Games	C+

Chronicles of the Sword was met with generally poor critical reception. As of 2014, the PC version holds the averaged GameRankings score of only 41%, based on five reviews. Game Informer, whose review stated that "point and click adventures don't get much worse than this [...] two disc menace," even gave the PlayStation version an award for the worst video game of 1997. According to Michael L. House of allgame, Chronicles of the Sword is so "frustrating, boring, sloppy and horrible" it "deserves an award for the 'Worst Adventure Game' in the genre to date."

Ron Dulin of GameSpot opined "Chronicles of the Sword does have some nice elements, most notably the richly detailed background art and the excellent musical score. But the positive features only manage to distract you from the fact that the game is confusing, frustrating and—worst of all—excruciatingly dull." Art Angel of GamePro described it as "so slow it should have been a simple animated movie." While he praised the voice acting and the clean cinematics, he remarked that the player character's slow movements and the excessive precision required in the point-and-clicking make the game dull to the point of being almost unplayable. PC Zone called it a game of "a couple of nice puzzles and some lovely graphics - but little else," as the story "is dull, consisting of some medieval stereotypes presented in a fancily-rendered environment." T. Liam McDonald of PC Gamer wrote: "Synthetic Dimensions has created some of the best-looking visuals yet seen in a traditional adventure game, but they forget to put a meaningful story and game into them. Visually and aurally, it's top-notch, but it doesn't measure up where it counts: content."

Some reviews lambasted even the game's visuals. Bob Strauss wrote in a 1996 review in Entertainment Weekly that Gawain "moves with all the speed and vitality of a knight in a 500-pound suit of armor" and the "jerky computer-animated characters might have looked impressive a decade ago." According to Game Informer, "not only are the graphics completely lame, but the character interface is slow and boring."

Several reviews especially criticised the "pixel hunting" aspect of the gameplay (forcing the player to examine all of the screen while looking for something to interact with). In Computer Gaming World, Scorpia called it "a mediocre product at best" and added that "anyone waning a taste of the real thing is better off reading Le Mort d'Arthur. NowGamer gave the PlayStation version the final verdict of "dull and painfully S-L-O-W."

Internationally, the game's reception was less negative, but its review scores were still mostly average, including 3/5 in Génération4 in France, 50% from Gambler, 60% from Secret Service and 65% from Świat Gier Komputerowych in Poland, and three out of five stars in PC Player and 61% from Videogames in Germany. Some international reviews were more positive, like in the cases of Germany's PC Games, Spain's PCmania, and Serbia's Svet Kompjutera, who gave it unusually good ratings of 74%, 88%, and 79%, respectively.
