= Zarlor Mercenary =

1990 video game

- Developer: Epyx
- Publisher: Atari Corporation
- Designer: Chuck Sommerville
- Programmers: Chuck Sommerville; Stephen Landrum
- Artist: Matt Crysdale
- Composer: Chris Grigg
- Platform: Atari Lynx
- Release: 1990
- Genre: Scrolling shooter
- Modes: Single-player, multiplayer

Zarlor Mercenary is a 1990 vertically scrolling shooter video game developed by Epyx and published by Atari Corporation for the Atari Lynx.

== Gameplay ==
Zarlor Mercenary is a vertically scrolling shoot 'em up in which the player controls a spacecraft destroying enemy spaceships and buildings in order to earn money which can be used to buy upgrades between levels. At the end of each level there is a boss ship or landing craft that needs to be destroyed. Up to four players can play simultaneously using the Comlynx. Noted in the game manual you don't start with life but a fleet of ships. In single-player you start off with four ships, in two player mode you start off with three ships each. With three and four players you only start the game with two ships each.

There are seven different pilot mercenaries to choose from, each having their own permanent unique weapon or skill. When playing in multiplayer mode, each player has a unique colour, you can either work together or towards completing the game. However one can purchase the weapon attachment backstabber that can kill another pilot causing him to lose money. Ship health is displayed on the right as a vertical green bar, this will deplete to yellow and flash red when near destruction. Ships left in the fleet are displayed as blue dots, while the mega bomb is displayed as a red dot.

Merchant of Venus shop

After each mission there is a shop run by the Merchant of Venus. Here you can purchase and sell extra items. These include extra ships, which is like buying extra lives. Speed Up, Wing Cannons, Super Shield (regenerating shielding), Power Shots, Laser, Auto Fire, Mega Bomb, Back Shooter and Side Shooter. There are also two items for use in multiplayer mode. Invisibility so you can hide from other players and Back stabber which will attack your allied friends and not the enemy as well as protecting your loot so you don't lose it in that life.

=== Plot ===
Gameplay screenshot

The war had been going on for years between the Mendicant and the Zarlor races. It wasn't going anywhere so the Zarlors decided to hire outside help. There are six key installations on the Mendicant's home planet of Yorith. The first mission is the Cadmar Desert where you are to locate and destroy a super weapon. The second mission Mesort Swamp holds a secret base. Third mission is in the Docrit Sea where you have to destroy the Mendicant Navy. Fourth mission titled Sedimor Domes is to attack a moon in the sector. Mardic Ice is the fifth mission where you fly to the ice caps of Mardi Koldavia, these ice caps are described as radioactive and here the Mendicants have built nuclear reactors, power plants and weapons factories. The sixth and final mission is Cedmite City the only city on the Mendicant planet, the Zarlors have asked for everything to be destroyed, all to be cleared out for colonisation.

== Development ==
Peter Engelbrite at Epyx who was known for including easter eggs and mini-games in Atari Lynx games also included a version of the cellular automata, Conway's Game of Life in Zarlor Mercenary.

== Reception ==
Reception

Review scores
Publication	Score
AllGame	2.5/5
Aktueller Software Markt	8/12
Computer and Video Games	74%
Dragon	5/5
Electronic Gaming Monthly	5/10, 5/10, 5/10, 5/10
Famitsu	6/10, 6/10, 8/10, 5/10
Génération 4	3/10
IGN	9/10
Joystick	73%
Player One	75%
Raze	74%
ST Action	80%
Tilt	9/20
Play Time	69%
Power Play	50%

Zarlor Mercenary received mixed reviews from critics.

In Computer and Video Games, Paul Glancey called Zarlor Mercenary "a decent-looking shoot 'em up, but quite difficult and not overly exciting to play." Clayton Walnum wrote in STart, "As you struggle to destroy the attacking aliens and blast the ground targets, you'll begin to understand what people mean by the term 'control pad ache'. This blastathon will please all players with a thirst for destruction."

In a 1999 retrospective review, Robert Jung of IGN stated "A great no-nonsense action game, perfect for people who love the 'shoot it if it exists' philosophy. The game itself is not easy, and the addition of four-player teamups and cash payments/transfers/power-ups ensure quite a bit of variety to the game. Though there are only six levels, they are quite varied, and should offer many challenging hours to the average player." Kyle Knight of AllGame praised the graphics but stated that "Zarlor Mercenary moves sluggishly". In July 2013 GamesRadar's Jeff Dunn wrote that Zarlor Mercenary along with Blue Lightning were the "obscure but excellent games" for the Lynx.
