= California Games =

1987 video game

- European Commodore 64/128 cover art
- Developer: Epyx: Amiga Westwood Associates Master System Sega NES Rare Genesis/Mega Drive Novotrade
- Publishers: NA: Epyx; EU: U.S. Gold; Lynx; Atari Corporation
- Designers: Chuck Sommerville; Ken Nicholson; Kevin Norman; Kevin Furry; Jon Leupp
- Artists: Jenny Martin; Susan Greene; Sheryl Knowles; Paul Vernon
- Composer: Chris Grigg; Gil Freeman: NES David Wise
- Series: California Games
- Platform: Commodore 64: Apple II, Amstrad CPC, Atari 2600, Amiga, MS-DOS, MSX, ZX Spectrum, Apple IIGS, Atari ST, Master System, NES, Atari Lynx, Sega Genesis/Mega Drive
- Release: June 1987: Commodore 64; NA: June 1987; EU: 1987 Apple II; October 1987 2600; June 1988 Amiga, MS-DOS; 1988 MSX, ZX Spectrum; EU: 1988 Master System; NA: May 1989; EU: July 1989 NES; NA: June 1989; EU: 1990 Lynx; NA: September 1989; JP: December 1, 1989; EU: 1989 Atari ST; 1989 Genesis/Mega Drive; EU: December 1991; NA: February 1992
- Genre: Sports
- Modes: Single-player, multiplayer

California Games is a 1987 sports video game developed and published by Epyx for the Apple II and Commodore 64. Branching from their Summer Games and Winter Games series, it is a collection of outdoor sports purportedly popular in California. The game was successful and was soon ported to other home computers and video game consoles, and was the pack-in game for the Atari Lynx when that system launched in September 1989. It was followed by the sequel California Games II in 1990.

Half Pipe event (C64)

The events vary slightly per platform, but include half-pipe, footbag, surfing (starring Rippin' Rick), roller skating, BMX, and flying disc.

== Development ==
Epyx reportedly used more than three man-years to develop California Games, including a surfer who wrote the surfing game. Several members of the development team moved on to other projects. Chuck Sommerville, the designer of the half-pipe game in California Games, later developed the game Chip's Challenge, while Ken Nicholson, the designer of the footbag game, would go on to invent of the DirectDraw technology later used in Microsoft's DirectX. Kevin Norman, the designer of the BMX game, went on to found the educational science software company Norman & Globus, makers of the ElectroWiz series of products.

The sound design for the original version of California Games was done by Chris Grigg, a member of the band Negativland.

== Ports ==
Originally written for the Apple II and Commodore 64, it was eventually ported to Amiga, Apple IIGS, Atari 2600, Atari ST, MS-DOS, Sega Genesis, Amstrad CPC, ZX Spectrum, Nintendo Entertainment System, MSX and Master System. The Atari Lynx version was the pack-in game for the system when it was launched in September 1989. A version for the Atari XEGS was planned and contracted out by Atari Corporation to Epyx in 1988, but no code was delivered by the publication deadline.

== Reception ==
Reception

Review scores
Publication	Score				
Publication	Atari 2600	C64	Master System	Sega Genesis	ZX
ACE			930/1000		
Crash					36%
Computer and Video Games	82%	37/40	95% 94%		
Dragon		4.5/5			
Electronic Gaming Monthly				5/10, 4/10, 4/10, 5/10	
Sinclair User					8/10
The Games Machine (UK)		92%			
Your Sinclair					7/10
Zzap!64		97%			
Console XS			83%		
MicroHobby					5/5
Mega				60%	
MegaTech				80%	

Award
Publication	Award
Zzap!64	Gold Medal

California Games was a commercial blockbuster. With more than 300,000 copies sold in the first nine months, it was the most successful Epyx game, outselling each of the four previous and two subsequent titles in the company's "Games" series. CEO Dave Morse said that it was the first Epyx game to appeal equally to boys and girls during playtesting. The game topped 500,000 units sold by 1989, at which time Video Games & Computer Entertainment reported that sales were "still mounting". In the United Kingdom, California Games topped Sega's Master System best-sellers chart published by Computer and Video Games in February 1990, ahead of Wonder Boy III, R-Type, Ghostbusters and World Soccer.

Computer Gaming World recommended the game, calling it fun. Compute! called California Games "both inventive and charming". "Epyx Software gives us a refreshing treat", PC Magazine said of the PC version, citing the surfing game's "outstanding animation and realistic graphics". In a capsule review for STart, Clayton Walnum said California Games "isn't a bad package, especially since it comes free with the Lynx". He found the BMX and surfing events great fun but deemed the skateboarding event frustrating and said the foot-bag event is pleasant but quickly wears thin.

In 1996, Next Generation listed the "Games" series collectively as number 89 on its "Top 100 Games of All Time". The magazine stated that though the games had great graphics for their time, their most defining qualities were their competitive multiplayer modes and "level of control that has yet to be equaled". In 2004, the Atari Lynx version of California Games was inducted into GameSpot's list of the greatest games of all time.

== Legacy ==
A California Games television series was considered in the late 1980s as part of the Super Mario Bros. Power Hour, a one-hour animation block of Nintendo-focused video game adaptations. Concept art was produced for the project by DIC Animation City. Only the Mario and Zelda segments for the block were ultimately produced, airing in 1989 as part of The Super Mario Bros. Super Show!.

The game was released for mobile phones in the Java format. The Commodore 64 version was released for the Wii's Virtual Console service in Europe on April 11, 2008, and in North America on July 6, 2009. The current rights holder is Epyx Games, LLC and they are working on a revival of this title with one of their existing development partners.
