= Alternative Party (demoparty) =

Event in Finland

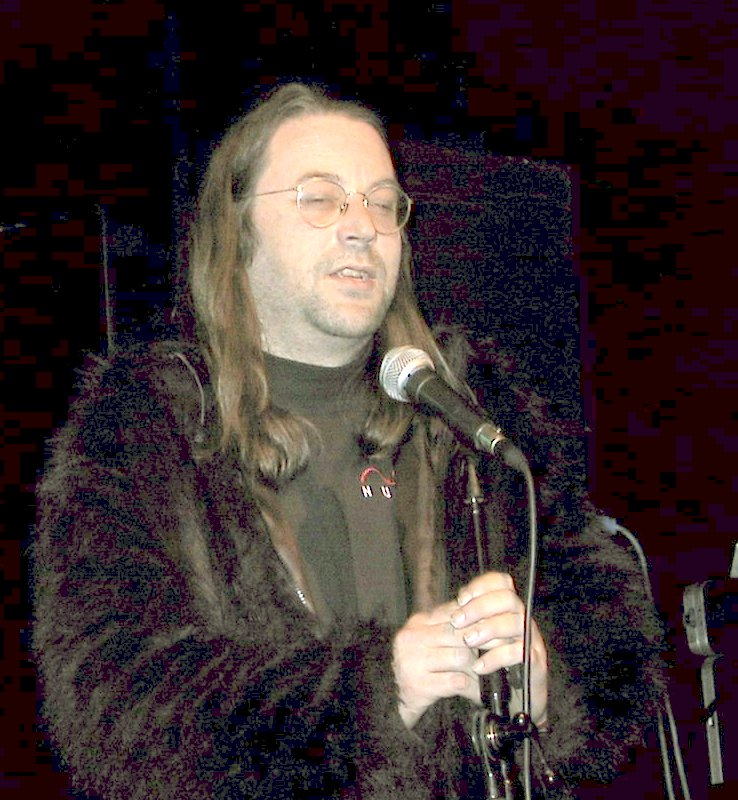
Jeff Minter speaking at Alternative Party 2003

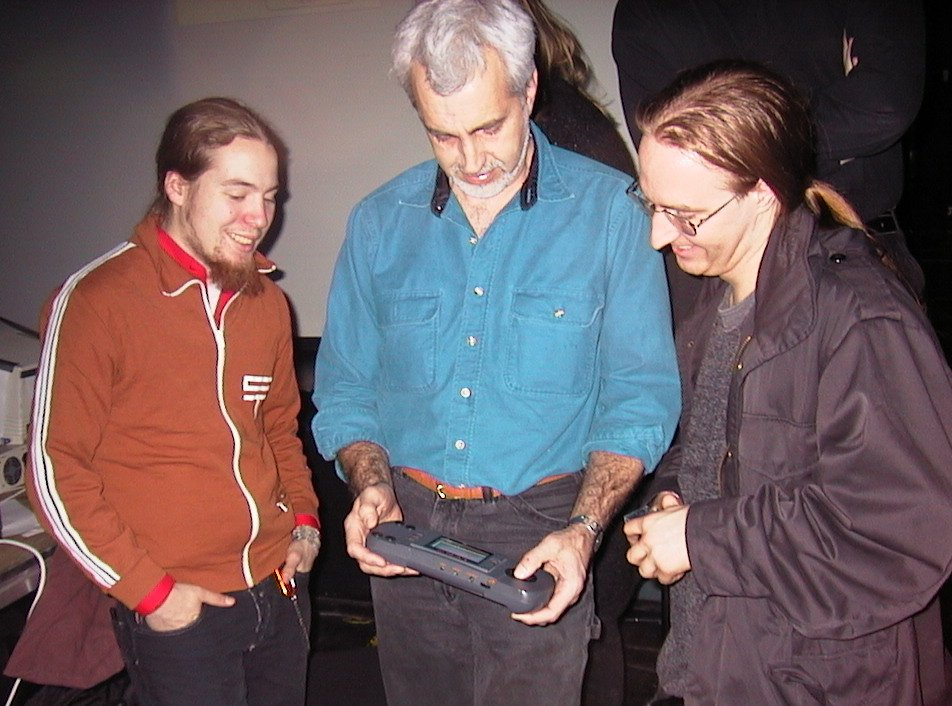
RJ Mical, the co-inventor of Atari Lynx, playing at Alternative Party 2002

Alternative Party is a demoscene and art event in Finland. It was first organized in 1998 in Turku and since 2000 in Helsinki. The event is organized by Alternative Party ry, a non-profit association.

Alternative Party is one of the largest demo parties in Finland. The aim of the event is to encourage artists (both demoscene and traditional arts) to creativity and new perspectives – regardless of the used equipment. The event is known for its peculiar competitions. The main focus has traditionally been on less common computers, although PCs are currently accepted as well.

The competitions—except for the main demo competition—tend to change every year as an extra challenge. There is also a traditional concert on the first evening, featuring artists of demoscene background playing live music.

The seventh Alternative Party was held on 2–4 November 2007 in Helsinki. Speakers included Al Lowe, creator of the legendary Leisure Suit Larry series of games.

The Alternative Party held on 24–26 October 2008 in Helsinki was the first time that one of the big pioneers of industrial music, Front 242, played for a Finnish audience. The special guest of honour was Brad Templeton, founder of ClariNet and, from 2008, chairman of the Electronic Frontier Foundation.

Cyberpunk themed Alt Party 2009 was held on 23–25 October 2009 at Cable Factory (Kaapelitehdas), Helsinki.

The event made a comeback in 2024, with Alternative Party 2024 held on 11-13 October 2024 at the Museum of Technology, Helsinki, exploring artificial intelligence and dynamic demos.

== Notable special guests ==
- 2002: RJ Mical
- 2003: Jeff Minter
- 2004: Jyrki Kasvi
- 2007: Al Lowe
- 2008: Front 242, Brad Templeton
- 2009: Dope Stars Inc., Jeri Ellsworth, Sophie Wilson
- 2010: Casey Pugh, Sini Merikallio, JP Metsävainio
- 2024: Nick Montfort
