= Firelord =

Firelord or Fire Lord may refer to:

- Firelord (character), a Marvel Comics character
- Firelord (novel), a 1980 Arthurian historical novel by Parke Godwin
- Firelord (video game), a 1986 action-adventure game
- Fire Lord, a title used by multiple characters from Avatar: The Last Airbender
