= PCGA =

- PC Gaming Alliance
- Philippine Coast Guard Auxiliary
