= Crackout =

There are several articles for the term: "Crackout".

Video Games:

- Crackout (video game) - The Breakout clone, released on the NES by Konami.
- Krakout - The Breakout clone released by Gremlin Graphics for various 8-Bit home computers.

Music:

- Crackout (Band)
