= Synthetic Dimensions =

UK game development and graphic design company

Synthetic Dimensions was a video game developer, 3D graphic design, animation and interactive media company based in Wolverhampton, United Kingdom. It was founded in 1985 in Solihull by Kevin Bulmer and his partner Kate Copestake and closed in 2012. Bulmer successfully took Synthetic public on both OFEX and AIM markets in 2000 (valued at 11 million pounds). It was also known as Dimension Creative Designs, Ltd. (DCD Ltd.). It is part of the Animation Forum West Midlands network.

== Company history ==
The company achieved the Innovations Award at the Consumer Electronics Show (CES) in 1996, in recognition of unique technologies developed for real-time, multi-user 3D game environments, and won the Wolverhampton Small Business of the Year title and the City of Birmingham Award for excellence in animation, both in 1998. In 1999, Synthetic worked with Iron Maiden, developing the computer game Ed Hunter and designed graphics and memorabilia for the band's The Ed Hunter Tour world tour. The company closed in 2012 after the death of Kevin from prostate cancer.

- 1985: Bulmer and Copestake form Synthetic Dimensions.
- 1998: SDSynthetic Dimensions wins the Small Business of the Year Award.
- 1999: Synthetic Dimensions floats on Ofex with a market valuation of £11 million.
- 2000: Bulmer is a semi-finalist in the Ernst & Young Entrepreneur of the Year Awards.
- 2001: Synthetic Dimensions moves to AIM with a valuation of £15.6 million.
- 2002: Bulmer and Copestake take the company private out of the parent group.
- 2012: Company closes after the death of Kevin. Kate founds Copestake Ltd.

== Video games ==
Including home ports of arcade games:

- Gauntlet (1986)
- Mickey Mouse: The Computer Game (1988)
- Gauntlet II (1988)
- Galaxy Force II (1989)
- Hot Rod (1989)
- Corporation (1990)
- Golden Axe (1990)
- Terminator 2: Judgment Day (1991)
- Legends of Valour (1992)
- Rapid Assault (1994)
- Druid: Daemons of the Mind (1995)
- Chronicles of the Sword (1996)
- Perfect Assassin (1997)
- Ed Hunter (1999)
