= California Games II =

1990 video game

California Games 2
- European box art
- Developer(s): Epyx; Probe Software (Master System)
- Publisher(s): NA: Epyx; EU: U.S. Gold
- Series: California Games
- Platform(s): Amiga, Atari ST, MS-DOS, Master System, Super NES
- Release: MS-DOS: NA: 1990; Amiga, Atari ST, SNES: NA: 1992; Master System: EU: August 1993
- Genre(s): Sports
- Mode(s): Single-player, multiplayer

Reception

Review score
Publication	Score
Sega Master Force	32%

California Games II is a sports video game released by Epyx for MS-DOS in 1990. Versions were published for the Amiga, Atari ST, and Super Nintendo Entertainment System in 1992, then the Master System in 1993. This game is a sequel to California Games. An Atari Lynx version was announced and previewed in several magazines but was never released.

== Gameplay ==
The included sports events are:

- Bodyboarding
- Hang gliding
- Jet surfing
- Skateboarding
- Snowboarding

The object of the game is to score as many points as possible by performing stunts and surviving the event. Each event has different play mechanics and physics as well.
