= Bombo (video game) =

1986 video game

- Publisher(s): Rino
- Platform(s): Commodore 64
- Release: June 1986
- Genre(s): Platform
- Mode(s): Single-player

Bombo is a platform game released by British video game publisher Rino for the Commodore 64 in 1985. It is a clone of Tehkan's 1984 arcade game Bomb Jack, the official Commodore 64 port of which was released earlier the same year.

The music was composed by Ben Daglish.

== Plot ==
Bombo is a clone of Bomb Jack.

Taken from the game's instructions:

A wave of insurrection has left the earth littered with bombs primed to explode and destroy mankind. Your commission is to clear the pyramids of ancient Egypt, castles of medieval Britain and hustling, bustling modern day New York City of this danger before their history becomes just a history. Hurry time is not on your side, neither are the many enemies left to harass you.

== Gameplay ==
Taken from the game's instructions:

You must collect 20 bombs from each screen, flashing bombs score more points and large bonuses are scored for collecting a majority of flashing bombs. Your Jetpack allows you full vertical movement in all directions which you must master quickly to work your way through the platforms of each level.
