= Games for Windows =

Microsoft brand

- Current owner: Microsoft
- Introduced: November 8, 2006
- Discontinued: August 25, 2013
- Related brands: Microsoft Studios
- Markets: Worldwide
- Registered as a trademark in: Worldwide
- Website: www.gamesforwindows.com (archived)

Games for Windows is a former brand owned by Microsoft and introduced in 2006 to coincide with the release of the Windows Vista operating system. The brand itself represents a standardized technical certification program and online service for Windows games, bringing a measure of regulation to the PC game market in much the same way that console manufacturers regulate their platforms. The branding program was open to both first-party and third-party publishers.

== History ==
Games for Windows was promoted through convention kiosks and through other forums as early as 2005. The promotional push culminated in a deal with Ziff Davis Media to rename the Computer Gaming World magazine to Games for Windows: The Official Magazine. The first GFW issue was published for November 2006. In 2008, Ziff Davis announced that the magazine would cease to be published, though online content would still be updated and maintained.

In 2013, Microsoft announced that Xbox PC Marketplace would cease operations, which would result in the discontinuation of the Games for Windows brand. In spite of this announcement, the company stated that content previously purchased could still be accessed via the Games for Windows – Live client software. Its successor is the Xbox app.

Games certified by Microsoft feature a prominent "Games for Windows" logo border across the top of their packaging, in a manner similar to games developed for the Xbox 360. Software must meet certain requirements mandated by Microsoft in order to display the brand on its packaging. These requirements include:

- An "Easy Install" option that installs the title on a PC in the fewest possible steps and mouse clicks
- Compatibility with Xbox 360 peripherals
- An "Only on Xbox 360 and Windows Vista" or "Only on Windows Vista" stamp for game packaging
- Compatibility with the Games Explorer
- Compatibility with x64 processors with proper installation and execution on 64-bit versions of Windows Vista and Windows 7; games themselves can be 32-bit
- Support for normal and widescreen resolutions, such as 4:3 aspect ratio (800 × 600, 1024 × 768), 16:9 aspect ratio (1280 × 720, 1920 × 1080), and 16:10 aspect ratio (1280 × 800, 1440 × 900, 1680 × 1050, 1920 × 1200)
- Support for parental controls and family safety features
- Support for launching from Windows Media Center

Microsoft claimed that it had increased its sales of Games for Windows-branded games in stores that had been giving the games greater focus, and stated that it planned to increase marketing efforts for the brand.

== Features ==
=== Cross-platform compatibility ===
Certain games certified under the Games for Windows brand, including Shadowrun, and UNO featured cross-platform compatibility, allowing gamers to play against each other across Xbox 360 consoles and traditional Windows Vista or Windows 7 PCs.

=== Offline play ===
Starting with Halo 2 on May 31, 2007, certain Games for Windows titles have access to Microsoft's Live network for online play and other features, including voice chat, instant messaging and friends lists, accessed from an in-game menu called the "Guide". Users can log in with their Xbox Live gamertags to gain achievements and play games and chat across platforms with games that support cross-platform compatibility. Some features, including cross-platform multiplayer gaming and multiplayer achievements, initially required a subscription to the Xbox Live Gold. However, on July 22, 2008, Microsoft announced that all Games for Windows functionality would be free for existing and future members, and that early adopters of the technology would receive refunds for previously incurred charges. In addition, Microsoft launched a Games for Windows Live Marketplace, similar to the Xbox Live Marketplace, which allowed users to download or purchase content, such as game demos, add-ons, and gamer pics, with Microsoft Points; the publisher of a title would determine if an item required to be purchased. At the same time, Microsoft announced its intentions to make the Games for Windows - Live client software interface more friendly and to reduce the technical requirements for developers.

=== Games Explorer ===
Games Explorer on Windows Vista showing information for the Hold 'Em poker game, including performance and content ratings

The Games Explorer, included with all versions of Windows Vista and Windows 7, is a special folder that showcases the games installed on a user's computer and their related information, essentially making it a games gallery. When a compatible game is installed, the operating system adds a shortcut of the game to the Games Explorer, and can optionally download additional information, such as game packaging and content rating information (e.g., ESRB, PEGI, USK, ACB, CERO) through the developer's own game definition file or from information provided by the Internet, although this feature was discontinued since 2016. Windows Experience Index information is also displayed within the interface. The feature was removed entirely in Windows 10 April 2018 Update.

Games Explorer supports custom commands for games and also includes shortcuts to configure various operating system components which may be pertinent to gamers, such as audio devices, display devices, firewall settings, and game controllers. In Windows Vista, Games Explorer allows developers to expose game metadata and thumbnails to the interface and Windows Search through a shell handler. The Games Explorer is fully compatible with the parental controls feature included in Windows Vista and Windows 7. Parental controls allows parents to include or preclude certain games from being played based on their content, rating, and/or title, and can also block games from being played altogether.

Compatibility typically depends on the age or popularity of a game, with newer games having better compatibility. If a game is incompatible, a user can manually add a game by dragging and dropping it to the Games Explorer.

=== Tray and Play ===
Tray and Play is a technology developed by Microsoft for Windows Vista that allows users to insert a game disc into an optical disc drive and play the game while it installs itself in the background and streams off the disc with minimal or zero caching—in a manner similar to a game console. The first and only commercial game known to use this technology is the Windows version of Halo 2.

=== Xbox 360 peripheral compatibility ===
Part of the Games for Windows initiative involved ensuring that Xbox 360 peripherals, such as the Xbox 360 Controller and Wireless Gaming Receiver worked across Windows platforms. Xbox 360 peripherals not only work with certified games, but also with the default games included with Windows Vista, such as Minesweeper.

== See also ==
- DirectX
- Index of Windows games
- List of Games for Windows titles
- List of Games for Windows – Live titles
- List of Windows Games on Demand
- List of Xbox games on Windows
- Live Anywhere
- PC Gaming Alliance
