= Dark Fusion =

1988 video game

- Developer: Gremlin Graphics
- Publisher: Gremlin Graphics
- Designer: Bernie Drummond
- Composer: Ben Daglish
- Platforms: ZX Spectrum, Amstrad CPC, Amiga, Commodore 64
- Release: April 1989
- Genres: Platform, shooter
- Mode: Single-player

Dark Fusion is a horizontally-scrolling platform shooter published by Gremlin Graphics in 1988. Levels are divided into three zones: Combat zone, Alien zone, and Flight zone. To enter a new zone, the player must first find a fusion pod. In the combat zone, the player controls an astronaut who has to go through levels by using a space shotgun. In Alien/Flight Zone, the player controls a space ship - first, fights against a giant alien, after killing these aliens the player makes their way to the Flight zone fusion pod then flies carefully through to the next level.

== Reception ==
Reception

Review scores
Publication	Score
Crash	80%
Sinclair User	79%
Your Sinclair	7/10

Dark Fusion received generally positive reviews from critics.
