= Legends of Valour =

1992 video game

Legends of Valour: Volume 1 – The Dawning
- Cover art by Fred Gambino
- Developer: Synthetic Dimensions
- Publishers: EU: U.S. Gold; NA: Strategic Simulations; JP: Ving Co.
- Producers: Strategic Simulations; Nicholas Beliaeff
- Designers: Kevin Bulmer; Ian Downend
- Programmers: Ian Downend; Graham Lilley; Paul Woakes
- Artists: Kevin Bulmer; Nigel Bunegar; Kate Copestake
- Composers: Ben Daglish; Martin Walker
- Platforms: MS-DOS, Amiga, Atari ST, PC-98, FM Towns
- Release: 1992 (DOS); 1993 (Amiga, ST, PC-98); 1994 (FM Towns)
- Genre: Role-playing video game
- Mode: Single-player

Legends of Valour is a role-playing video game developed by Synthetic Dimensions and released by U.S. Gold and Strategic Simulations in 1992-1993 for the Amiga, Atari ST and MS-DOS, with the additional FM Towns and PC-98 versions in 1993-1994 in Japan only (as Legends of Valour: Gouyuu no Densetsu). As the game was planned to be a first part of the series, its full title is Legends of Valour: Volume I – The Dawning.

== Plot ==
The protagonist arrives in the walled city of Mittledorf to visit their cousin Sven. Shortly after their arrival, the city is quarantined due to a plague outbreak and they are barred from leaving. Sven is missing, and throughout the course of the game, the protagonist seeks to find him. This is the starting point of the game's main quest that ends with the protagonist restoring the king to power.

== Gameplay ==
The game features a point-and-click interface, an either automated or realtime combat, and day/night cycle. The game's mechanics are complex for its time, requiring the player to eat, drink, sleep, pay taxes and take out life insurance. The game takes place in a walled capital city called Mitteldorf, where the player can explore the streets, buildings and a massive network of dungeons and sewers connected through a natural cave system, while completing various missions given by its numerous citizens. Mitteldorf is over a square mile in size and among its many buildings are several taverns, hostels, shops, guilds, temples, prisons as well as other places of interest - well over a hundred locations in total. The player may join guilds, such as the Thieves, Mercenaries, and Men at Arms guilds, or temples for deities, including Asegeir, Loki, Set, Odin, Freya, and Aegir. Joining a guild or temple may prevent membership with others, for example, joining the Thieves Guild prevents the player from joining the temple of Odin, but the player may still join the temples of Asegeir, Set, or Aegir. The guilds and temples offer the player career paths with unique missions and provide a weekly wage. There are two different types of spells: magic spells, and religious spells, the latter may only be obtained by joining a Temple.

Characters are defined by four attributes: Strength, Intelligence, Speed, and Health. These four statistics are determined by a dice-roll and can be re-rolled as desired during character creation, and the player's race adds bonuses to certain attributes. Strength determines a character's combat prowess, Intelligence determines magical ability and ability to reason, and speed determines a character's movement speed, ability to dodge attacks, and accuracy in combat. The player can choose to play as a human, an elf, or a dwarf; the chosen race influences relations with other characters. Elves gain bonuses to Intelligence and Speed but lower health, dwarves gain bonuses to Health and Strength, but lower speed. Human characters are average in all statistics. The protagonist's gender has no effect on statistics, but affects interactions with NPCs.

During the game, the player's character can become a vampire or a werewolf. The player character can become drunk, which impairs movement and vision, and be arrested for this. Characters can become undernourished if they neglect their needs (food, water and sleep) and are more likely to catch a disease. Passing guards may overhear illegal conversations.

== Development ==
Legends of Valour development for the Amiga began in May 1991 and continued over two years. U.S. Gold described Legends of Valour with the catchphrase 'A Virtual World'. Advertisements for Legends of Valour claimed "Ultima Underworld, move over! ... Experience the hottest, smoothest 3-D scrolling graphics ever in an underworld, or any world!" A demo for Legends of Valour was featured on Amiga Format issue #40's coverdisk.

The One interviewed Kevin Bulmer, one of Legends of Valour's designers, for information regarding its development in a pre-release interview. Bulmer states that the game's city of Mitteldorf is "a mile and half [sic] long from North to South and three-quarters of a mile from East to West. According to US Gold's playtesters, the ground plan of the town is eight times the size of Eye of the Beholder 2 and they reckon that to visit every location on the ground level, doing nothing else and playing the game all night and at the weekends, would take you over two weeks." In regards to the design of the game's dungeons, Bulmer explains that "we design the puzzles we're putting in the map, rather than draw a map and then fit the puzzles into it." Legends was first developed on PC using texture mapping, but this could not be directly ported to the Amiga version, as "on the Amiga each pixel is represented by a number of bits scattered over several bytes. So, wherease [sic] on the PC you can change a pixel in one go by writing to just one byte, on the Amiga you have to write to several bytes, making sure that you don't alter any of the other bits in the process, which takes a lot longer." Bulmer said that "we did the Amiga first as a texture-mapped polygon game like the PC but it was so slow because the maths is a nightmare ... So what we're now doing is ray-tracing the player's view, which is a scheme Ian came up with for the PC but we never had time to do." Programmers for the Amiga port, Graham Lilley and Paul Woakes, implemented ray tracing for the Amiga version to help the game run better, "and solved any problems there were" with it. The One's interviewer notes that ray tracing the 3D scenes is more complicated mathematically, to which Bulmer responds that "It is and it should be incredibly slow ... But it isn't. Now we know why it works but we're not telling anybody else! Theoretically the Amiga version should be playing on an 8MHz 286 PC but using this technique we've developed it's more like playing on 16MHz 386. It's given us a huge increase in performance. In fact, we want to take it back over to the PC for the sequel when we get time." The Amiga's ray traced 3D allows functional windows, through which the player can see into or out of a building. Bulmer enthuses about this feature in the Amiga version, stating that "You can look diagonally across a building, through a window, into a room, out of the window on the other side and into another street to another building and into a window there." A key feature of Legends' combat are the three ways of striking with a weapon: crushing, jabbing, and swinging with it. Bulmer noted that "each weapon has an optimum way of being used and each monster has an optimum way of being attacked." People in Legends are stored as a set of eight 50-pixel high sprites, while monsters and large objects such as trees and streetlights are kept at a 100-pixel scale. The eight sprites correspond to each possible rotation at which a character can be viewed, and sprites are "shrunk" in real time to correspond to how much of the character is positioned in the player's view. When in dialogue or combat, characters are shown close-up; this sprite is shown in greater detail than when the player is not in dialogue or combat with them. Legends of Valour's dialogue operates in a tree structure, and as the player explores, more conversation topics regarding specific items, areas, and people of interest become available.

== Reception ==
Reception

Review scores
| Publication | Score |
|---|---|
| The One | 92% (Amiga) |
| Amiga Format | 91% (Amiga), 86% (Amiga re-release) |
| Amiga Power | 88% (Amiga), 89% (Amiga re-release) |
| CU Amiga | 88% (Amiga) |
| Amiga Action | 64% (Amiga) |
| Pelit | 45% (Amiga) |
| Dragon | 2/5 (MS-DOS) |

The PC version was generally poorly received. Computer Gaming World called the game "a stimulating new perspective on fantasy role-playing", but strongly criticized its "general lack of atmosphere" and other "numerous deficiencies", including the difficulty in saving the game or finding food, drink, and sleep. Despite liking the 3-D VGA graphics, the magazine warned that the "grandiose claims" Strategic Simulations made about the game and Spelljammer: Pirates of Realmspace threatened the company's "long-standing reputation for quality". It received 2 out of 5 stars in Dragon. According to VideoGames & Computer Entertainment, "Legends of Valor is an ambitious attempt that couldn't get itself out of the starting gate."

The Amiga version was received much better, and was rated 88% by CU Amiga, with Amiga Format stating in their original review, "Legends of Valor is a cross between a Dungeons & Dragons game and a graphic adventure ... the [actual] interface is intuitive and well designed ... there are plenty of nice touches ... if you've met the person before then they'll remember you." In a 1993 issue, Amiga Format rated the game 91%, but in a 1995 issue the re-release was given 86% despite being the same game. Amiga Power continues the same trend, giving the game 88% in a 1993 issue, and the re-release 89% in a 1995 issue.

The One gave the Amiga version of Legends of Valour an overall score of 92%, referring to its first-person 3D perspective as "revolutionary ... until you've seen the 3D in action it's hard for words to explain just how exhilarating the experience can be." The One praises the UI, calling it "intuitive", and the combat and graphics, stating that "the excellent use of 3D extends to the combat as well - at last you can see your sword blade or axe head hitting home, and the animation on the enemies is superb ... Visually Legends is nothing short of breathtaking." The One extended critical acclaim to the quests and worldbuilding, expressing that "as a game Legends is beautifully structured ... as the player grows in experience and power new tasks and different areas of the gameworld are slowly revealed, ensuring that the player is constantly being presented with fresh challenges and surprises ... Legends is nothing short of a revolution in computer role-playing, and has become the standard by which future additions to the RPG genre will be judged."

Finnish gaming magazine Pelit gave the Amiga version of Legends of Valour an overall score of 45%, beginning their review by stating that "[Legends of Valour] sets the standards that all role-playing games will be compared to - that is, for the worse ... The game has been successfully buried under idiotic design." Pelit criticises Legends of Valour's gameplay, expressing their disdain for the length of time it takes to travel to specific locations, and states that "moving along the streets has been hampered by 'ingenious' random arrests ... To stay alive, one has to sleep, drink, and eat, but cannot when it is so IMPOSSIBLE! One of the reasons behind this problem is money, or its lack thereof." Pelit further criticises the implementation of the need to drink, expressing their frustration that drinking alcohol may result in the player being arrested, and states that "apparently one must constantly return to a pond to drink muddy water. It cannot be bottled because the game has no bottles to refill." Pelit further criticises Legends of Valour's gameplay and items, stating that "except for weapons, items are useless," and "the gameplay under all this idiotic design is pathetic. The Commodore PC-10's homemade text adventures offer more variety. Interaction with other people is very limited. No one lives anywhere, they just wander. Houses are empty except for tables. About 90% of the buildings are insignificant and there is nothing usable in the shops. People will attack you if they don't like how you look. Yet, your character is arrested, even though the city is filled with psychopaths." Pelit expresses their frustration for guilds in Legends of Valour, stating that "there is no point in joining the guilds because the hero has no abilities to develop! You need to join the guilds only because the design of the game requires it." Pelit's only compliment for Legends of Valour is its graphics, calling movement "technically sound" and expressing that "externally, it looks good and with the smallest window, it updates quickly, which is a plus." Pelit concludes their review by stating that "In [Legends of Valour] EVERYTHING is so perfectly (swear word) that the human brain capacity is not enough to understand it. Maybe we're just stupid."

== Legacy ==
Bethesda Softworks's Todd Howard cited the game as an influence on Bethesda's RPG series The Elder Scrolls. The first game in the series, The Elder Scrolls: Arena, was inspired by "the unheralded" Legends of Valour and Ultima Underworld. Ted Peterson said: "There was another game that came out while we were working on Arena called Legends of Valour, which was a free-form first-person perspective game that took place in a single city. It got pretty pitiful reviews and not many people bought it, but I really had fun with it. It's completely forgotten nowadays, but I probably logged more hours playing it than any other game."
