= Federation of Free Traders =

1989 video game

- Publisher(s): Gremlin Graphics
- Composer(s): Ben Daglish
- Platform(s): Amiga, Atari ST
- Release: EU: 1989
- Mode(s): Single-player

Federation of Free Traders is a space trading video game released in 1989 for the Amiga and Atari ST. The game is similar in scope to Elite, involving space simulation and exploration tilted towards trading. The player is tasked with exploring and discovering the billions of procedurally generated galaxies and planets. The game was developed and published by Gremlin Interactive.

== Reception ==
Reception

Award
Publication	Award
Zzap!64	Gold Medal

== See also ==
- Elite (video game)
