= Axel's Magic Hammer =

1989 video game

- Developer: Core Design
- Publisher: Gremlin Graphics
- Composer: Ben Daglish
- Platforms: Amiga, Atari ST
- Release: 1989
- Genre: Platform
- Mode: Single-player

Axel's Magic Hammer is a platform game developed by Core Design and published by Gremlin Graphics in 1989. The game was released for the Amiga and Atari ST.
