= Basil the Great Mouse Detective =

1987 video game

- Publisher: Gremlin Graphics
- Designer: Bob Armour
- Composer: Ben Daglish
- Platforms: Amstrad CPC, Atari 8-bit, Commodore 64, ZX Spectrum
- Release: 1987
- Genres: Platform, action-adventure

Basil, the Great Mouse Detective is a platform, action-adventure game designed by Bob Armour and published by Gremlin Graphics in 1987 for the Amstrad CPC, Atari 8-bit computers and Commodore 64. The game is based on the 1986 Disney animated film The Great Mouse Detective.

== Plot ==
The protagonist of the game is a mouse named Basil who resides in the basement of the fabled 221b Baker Street home of Sherlock Holmes. The evil Professor Ratigan has abducted Basil's friend, Dr. Dawson, and he now has to scour London for hints that will help him find the villain's hideout.

== Gameplay ==
Atari 8-bit screenshot

The player controls Basil by walking around the chambers, passing from one to another through the edges of the screen (if possible) or squeezing through letter slots and other holes in the walls. In the locations, in addition to numerous enemies, there are various objects. Most of them are just decorations, but in each level there are at least two types of containers in which Basil can find items. So when the player spots a container, bin, jar or something similar they should search it. Once the player has collected all the evidence in a level, they need to find the passage to the next stage, which was previously masked. The above steps must be repeated until the game is completed, and there are a total of three levels: London's shops and docks, the sewers and finally the hideout of the evil Ratigan.

== Reception ==
John S. Davison for Page 6 said: "Overall, the game looks good, sounds good, plays well, and has just the right balance of intellectual challenge to keep players of all ages coming back for more". What? said: "A lovely game with lots of atmosphere and excitement". Adam Rigby for The Australian Commodore and Amiga Review said: "Basil the Great Mouse Detective is a good game with a rather refreshing plot". Crash said that "the characters are very Walt Disneyesque, though the wiry graphics aren't as attractive as they could have been". Zzap! wrote: "Check this out if you like arcade adventures, but don't expect anything especially innovative". Sinclair User wrote that "the game play is strong, and the graphics are rather smart".
