= Future Knight =

1986 video game

- Developer: Gremlin Graphics
- Publisher: Gremlin Graphics
- Composer: Ben Daglish
- Platforms: Amstrad CPC, Commodore 64, MSX, ZX Spectrum
- Release: December 1986
- Genre: Platform
- Mode: Single-player

Future Knight is a 2D, flip screen platform game released by Gremlin Graphics in 1986 for the Amstrad CPC, Commodore 64, MSX, and ZX Spectrum. The player must guide Randolph through twenty levels of hostile robots and aliens before defeating Spegbott and rescuing Amelia.

== Plot ==
The space cruiser S.S. Rustbucket has crashed on Planet 2749 of the Zragg System, and its passengers been taken hostage by Spegbott the Terrible and his minions. Among them is the Princess Amelia, beloved of the Future Knight Randolph, who has now teleported into the wreck of the Rustbucket to defeat Spegbott and rescue her.

== Gameplay ==
An undocumented level editor is included in the Spectrum version which can be accessed from the main menu by pressing the key combination EDIT-F-K.

== Reception ==
Sinclair User:

If you leave Randolph standing still for too long a period, he'll wave at you as incentive to get a move on. Leave him in the same spot for much longer and things start to get really desperate: Randolph will go completely bezerk, spinning round and round, flailing his arms and panicking in an astoundingly convincing manner. Ignore him then and the chances are his constitution will plummet at a tremendous rate.

The game was reviewed in 1990 in Dragon #158 by Hartley, Patricia, and Kirk Lesser in "The Role of Computers" column, as part of the Mastertronic MEGA Pack of 10 games previously released in Europe. The reviewers gave the game 1 out of 5 stars, criticizing its premise and gameplay.
