= Kevin Bulmer =

English artist and video game designer (1962–2011)

Kevin Bulmer (1962, in Solihull – 12 November 2011, in Tettenhall), also known as Kev Bulmer, was an English artist, game designer and president of the graphic design and video game company Synthetic Dimensions, which was co-founded by him in 1985. Earlier in his career, he was a contributor to White Dwarf magazine. In 2009, Bulmer was given an honorary degree by the University of Wolverhampton for being a "pioneer of 3D image technology and computer games development", in particular for developing "a world-leading two-dimensional (2D) to 3D image conversion system which has been used worldwide by companies such as Nike, Reebok, Peugeot, Disney, EMI and Newline Cinema". Bulmer announced his plans to re-enter the video game industry in 2008, but died in 2011 of prostate cancer.

== Video games ==
- Gauntlet (1986) - graphics (Amstrad CPC, Atari 8-bit, Commodore 64, Master System, ZX Spectrum)
- M.A.S.K. (1987) - graphics
- Gauntlet II (1987) - graphics (Amiga, Amstrad CPC, Commodore 64, ZX Spectrum)
- Techno Cop (1988) - graphics (ZX Spectrum)
- Skate Crazy (1988) - graphics (Amstrad CPC, ZX Spectrum)
- Mickey Mouse: The Computer Game (1988) - graphics (Amiga, ZX Spectrum)
- Dragons of Flame (1989) - graphics (Amiga, DOS)
- Hoverforce (1990) - graphics (DOS)
- Hot Rod (1990) - graphics (Amiga, Atari ST)
- Galaxy Force II (1990) - graphics (Amiga, Atari ST)
- Corporation (1990) - game design and graphics
- Shadow Sorcerer (1991) - additional design and playtesting (Amiga, Atari ST), graphics and playtesting (DOS)
- Legends of Valour (1992) - original idea, game design, graphics/artwork
- The Flash (1993) - graphics
- Druid: Daemons of the Mind (1995) - original concept, managing director
- Druid: Daemons of the Mind (1995) - original concept, managing director
- Rapid Assault (1995) - graphics
- Perfect Assassin (1997) - project lead, lead artist, AI/programming, graphics
