= Druid: Daemons of the Mind =

1995 video game

- Developer: Synthetic Dimensions
- Publisher: Sir-Tech: JP: Koei
- Designers: Kevin Bulmer; Matt Stott
- Programmer: John Wildsmith
- Writer: Brenda Brathwaite
- Composer: Ben Daglish
- Platforms: MS-DOS, Windows, PlayStation, Saturn
- Release: December 7, 1995 (MS-DOS): JP: 1997 (Windows); JP: February 19, 1998 (PS); JP: July 2, 1998 (Saturn)
- Genre: Action role-playing
- Mode: Single-player

Druid: Daemons of the Mind is an action role-playing video game developed by British studio Synthetic Dimensions and published by Sir-Tech for MS-DOS. It was later ported to Microsoft Windows, PlayStation and Sega Saturn by Koei in Japan.

== Gameplay ==
Druid: Daemons of the Mind is an action role-playing game with graphic adventure elements.

== Reception ==
Reception

Review scores
Publication	Score
Computer Games Strategy Plus	3.5/5
Computer Gaming World	2.5/5
Next Generation	4/5
PC Gamer (US)	81%
Arcane	5/10
PC Entertainment	3.5/5

Next Generation reviewed the PC version of the game, rating it four stars out of five, and stated that "hard-core fans of either RPGs or graphic adventures won't find much satisfaction. The puzzles can be rather simple, and though the story is well crafted and deep, role-playing fanatics will be annoyed at the lack of statistics and manipulation of your character. Still, if you're just getting into either genre, this one does a great job of taking some of the aspects of both."

Andy Butcher reviewed Druid: Daemons of the Mind for Arcane magazine, rating it a 5 out of 10 overall. Butcher comments that "the various elements don't really seem to fit together very well, and the game has a somewhat disjointed feel to it. Combine this with an awkward combat system that requires split-second timing, and you end up with something of a poor man's Ultima VIII (a game which Druid resembles in many ways)."
