= Perfect Assassin =

1997 video game

- Developer(s): Synthetic Dimensions
- Publisher(s): Grolier Interactive
- Platform(s): MS-DOS, PlayStation
- Release: 1997 (DOS), 1998 (PlayStation)
- Genre(s): Point and click adventure
- Mode(s): Single-player

Perfect Assassin is a point and click adventure released by Grolier Interactive for MS-DOS and the PlayStation in 1997 and 1998 respectively. The game's titular character, Charon, a cyborg with superhuman abilities, suddenly loses his memory during one of his most important missions, landing on the planet Kar-Naq. Hunted by strangers using only his old instincts as a weapon, he must remember the target of his mission and execute it, before he himself is assassinated.

Fantasy comic artist Kev Walker was recruited to create the environment for the game.

The game uses a third-person perspective and a mouse-driven interface despite using a 3D engine.

Perfect Assassin is complemented by a topical conversation system that lets players set the tone/mood of the protagonist.
