= Museum of Technology, Helsinki =

Museum in Helsinki, Finland

Museum of Technology
- Tekniikan Museo
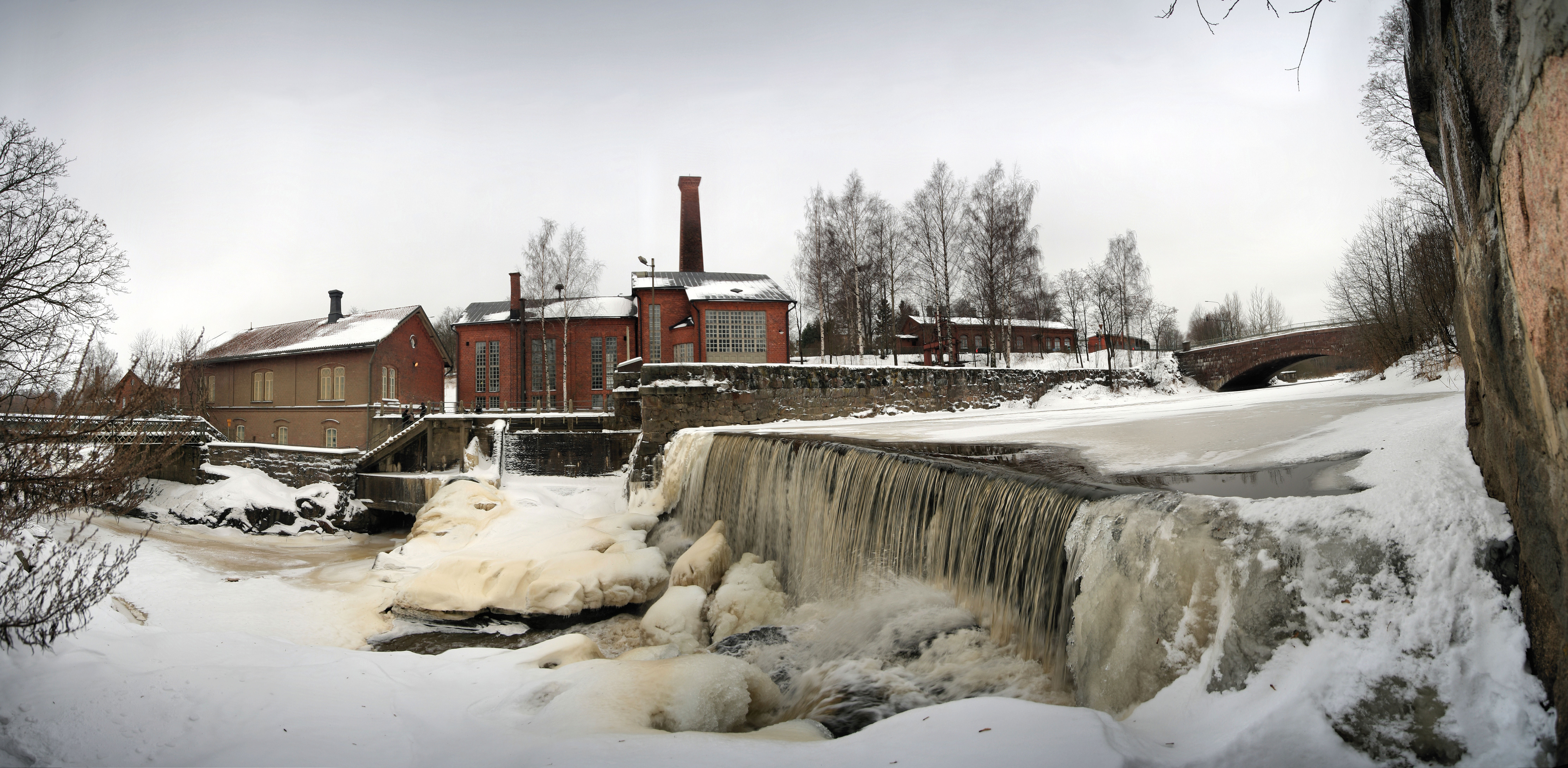
- Established: 1969
- Location: Vanhakaupunki, Helsinki, Finland
- Coordinates: 60°12′59″N 024°58′57″E
- Collection size: approx. 19,000 objects
- Website: www.tekniikanmuseo.fi

The Museum of Technology, Helsinki, (Finnish: Tekniikan museo) is located in Helsinki, Finland. It is the only general museum of technology in the country.

The Museum of Technology is operated by the private Museum of Technology Foundation which was established in 1969. The foundation was established by industrial and engineering organizations, museum professionals and the municipalities of the Helsinki metropolitan area.
