= Chip's Challenge =

1989 video game

- Cover art
- Developer: Epyx
- Publishers: Atari Corporation (Lynx); U.S. Gold (ST, Amiga, Spectrum, CPC); Epyx (MS-DOS, C64); Microsoft Home (Windows); Pixel Games UK (Switch)
- Designer: Chuck Sommerville
- Programmer: Chuck Sommerville
- Artist: Paul Vernon
- Composers: Robert Vieira; Alex Rudis
- Series: Chip's Challenge
- Platforms: Windows, MS-DOS, Atari Lynx, Atari ST, Amiga, Commodore 64, ZX Spectrum, Amstrad CPC, Nintendo Switch
- Release: 1989
- Genre: Puzzle
- Mode: Single-player

Chip's Challenge is a 1989 tile-based puzzle video game developed by Epyx and published by Atari Corporation for the Atari Lynx. It was released as a launch title for the console. It was later ported to several other systems and was included in the Windows 3.1 bundle Microsoft Entertainment Pack 4 (1992), and the Windows version of the Best of Microsoft Entertainment Pack (1995), where it found a much larger audience.

The original game was designed by developer Chuck Sommerville, who also made about a third of the levels. Most of the conversions from the Atari Lynx original to other formats were carried out by Images Software in the UK.

The game was re-released on Steam on May 28, 2015, along with a sequel, Chip's Challenge 2, which was also designed by Sommerville.

== Gameplay ==
Atari Lynx version screenshot

The premise of the game is that high-school nerd Chip McCallahan has met Melinda the Mental Marvel in the school science laboratory and must navigate through Melinda's "Clubhouse", a series of increasingly difficult puzzles, in order to prove himself and gain membership to the very exclusive Bit Busters Club.

Chip's Challenge consists of a series of 148 two-dimensional levels (149 in Microsoft's version) which feature the player character, Chip McCallahan, often called just Chip, and various game elements such as computer chips, buttons, locked doors, water and lethal monsters. Gameplay involves using arrow keys, numeric keypad or mouse to move Chip about each of the levels in turn, collecting enough chips to open the chip socket at the end of each level, get to the exit, and move on to the next level.

While the same set of rules applies to each level, there are many different kinds of levels. Some are action-oriented and some are puzzle-oriented. Most levels have a time limit. Levels may include block-pushing puzzles (similar to Sokoban), dodging enemies, and moving through mazes. Levels can be skipped by entering an appropriate four-letter non-case-sensitive password. For the PC versions, game progress is automatically saved. If the player has a lot of trouble with a level, the game gives the option to skip to the next level. Progress is measured in terms of completed levels and player score, which is a sum of the scores obtained on each level. Level scores for timed levels can be improved by quickly completing the level, and scores on all levels can be improved by using fewer attempts to complete the level.

== Development ==
In 1989, Sommerville led a team of programmers at Epyx to write Chip's Challenge for Atari Lynx during a ten-week period shortly before the system's launch. Sommerville had developed a crude prototype of the game on an Apple II to develop the game's logic and to demonstrate to Epyx that it would be fun. Sommerville designed about a third of the levels, Bill Darrah designed another third, and the rest were developed by other Epyx staff.

Windows screenshot

Chip's Challenge was ported to several other systems, including the Atari ST, Amiga, Commodore 64, ZX Spectrum, MS-DOS, and Windows. Most of the conversions from the Atari Lynx original to other formats were carried out by Images Software in the UK, except for the Microsoft Windows version.

Microsoft licensed Chip's Challenge from Epyx for a Windows 3.1 version of the game, developed by Microsoft under the direction of Tony Garcia. Tony Krueger coded the program by reverse-engineering the MS-DOS version. Artwork was by Ed Halley. Entering "TONY" as a password will bring the player to a level that credits the "WEP 4 test team" in the hint for that level and also contains different tiles that spell out developer names, including Doug T., Rob D., Ed H., and Lisa F. According to Doug, a former roommate of Krueger's and one of the testers for the game, it was written in a single summer.

The Microsoft version was included in the fourth Microsoft Entertainment Pack and Best of Microsoft Entertainment Pack. This version had significantly different sound and graphics, but became very popular due to the success of the Microsoft Entertainment Pack. The sequel, Chip's Challenge 2 would be based on this version.

BBS and early Internet forums dedicated to the Microsoft version allowed users to share home-made level editors and unofficial expansion packs, which was an early example of software modding.

== Reception ==
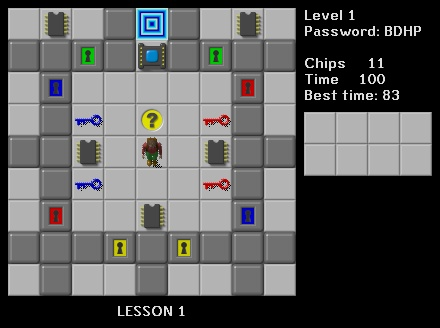
Tile World is an open source clone.

STart's Clayton Walnum remarked, "If there's one game that will sell Lynxes, Chip's Challenge is it." He applauded the consistently high quality of the puzzles, saying that each one is "a visual and intellectual delight." Computer Gaming World called Chip's Challenge a casual game with "a set of addicting, puzzle solving levels ... a quick fix for testing the acceleration speed of one's brain".

The One reviewed the Amiga version of Chip's Challenge in 1990, giving it an overall score of 88%, and expressing that while "It might not look or sound like much, but Chip's Challenge packs a very addictive punch. The iconic graphics are colorful but little more than functional, and the musical accompaniment is inoffensive if endlessly repetitive – but in this game, frills don't count." The One praises Chip's Challenge's gameplay, calling it "a puzzle player's dream", expressing that the game's puzzles require "quick thinking" and "experimentation", and further praises their difficulty.

== Legacy ==
Prompted by the popularity of the Microsoft releases, Sommerville created a sequel, Chip's Challenge 2, in 1999. Sommerville was unable to release it independently, as the trademark was owned by Bridgestone Multimedia Group. Bridgestone, a Christian publishing company, had purchased Epyx's assets when that company folded in order to acquire Bible software produced by the company. Bridgestone had little experience with the video game industry, and required that Sommerville pay a six-figure fee for the right to publish the game, which was not consistent with industry norms. Sommerville resumed negotiations in 2010 and, after five years, Bridgestone and Sommerville's company Niffler released Chip's Challenge 2 via Steam on May 28, 2015, alongside a Steam release of the original game and a level editor.

During the negotiation period, Sommerville's company Niffler also developed other similar puzzle games. Chuck's Challenge was released in 2012 for iOS systems from the iTunes Store. The game was later licensed by Cartoon Network as the basis for a series of official Ben 10 games called Ben 10 Game Generator.

Chuck's Challenge 3D (2014) was funded through Kickstarter, and released for Windows, Mac, and Linux on Steam, and for Android on Google Play. The game was also a launch title for the Nvidia Shield.
