= RJ Mical =

American programmer and hardware designer

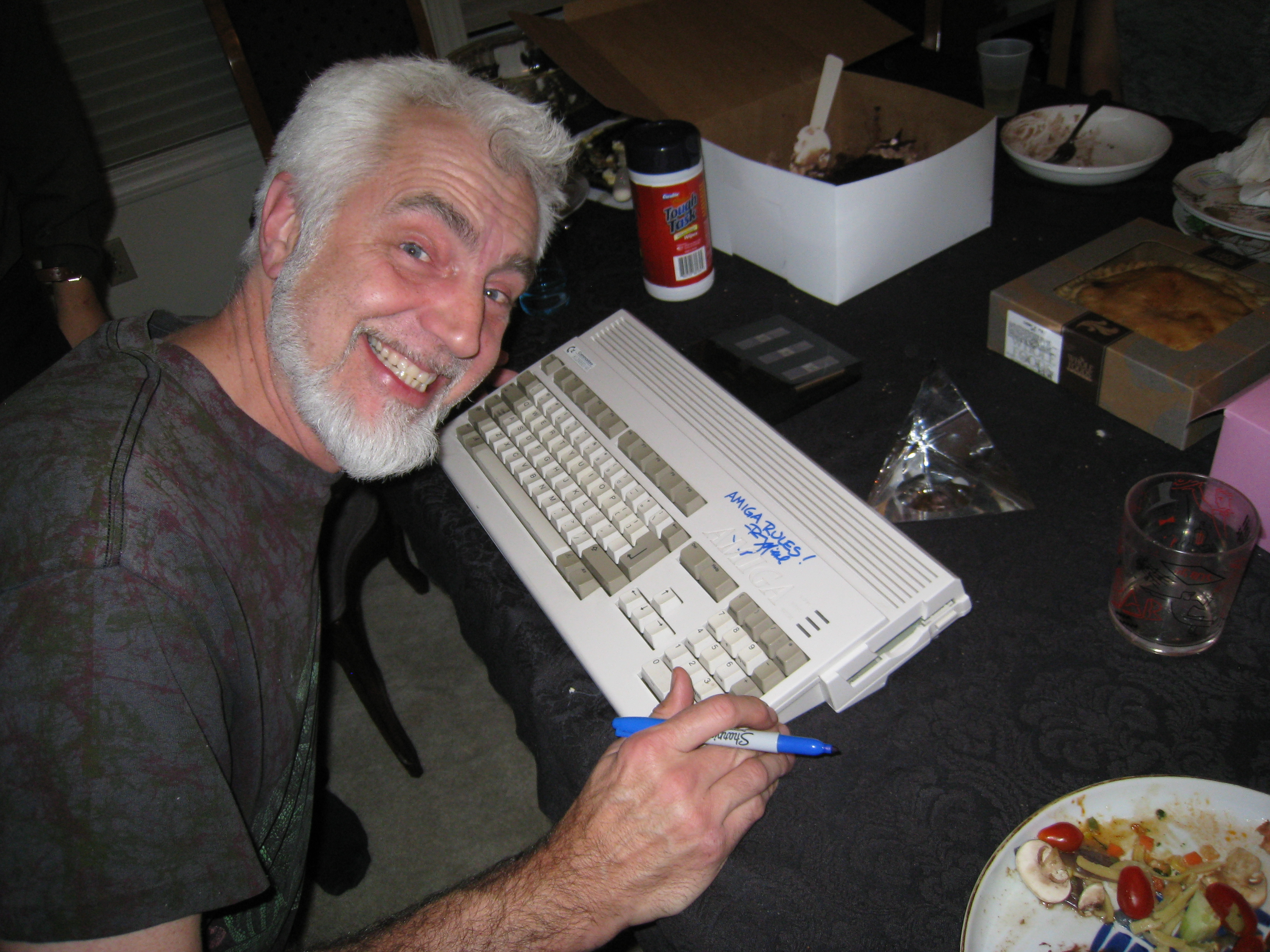
- Signing an Amiga 1200 for the 25th anniversary of the Amiga (2011)
- Born: Robert J. Mical; 26 January 1956 (age 70)
- Occupations: Computer programmer; hardware designer; product manager
- Website: mical.org

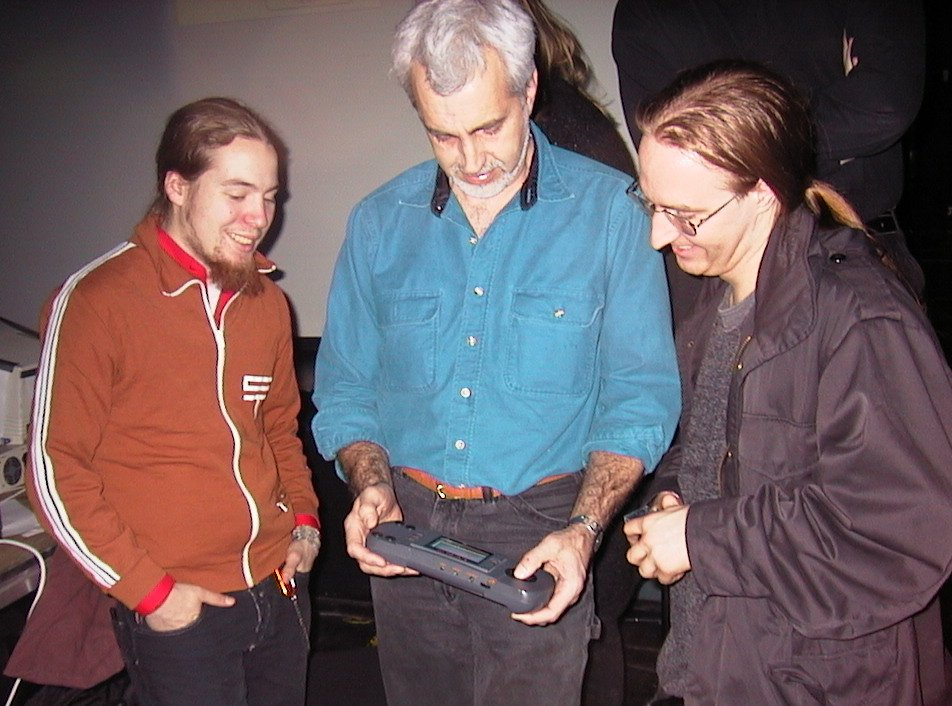
Playing the Lynx that he co-designed at Alternative Party 2002

Robert J. Mical (born 26 January 1956) is an American computer programmer and hardware designer who has primarily worked in video games. He is best known for creating the user interface, Intuition, for Commodore's Amiga personal computer (1985), contributing to the design of the Amiga hardware, and co-designing, with Dave Needle, the Atari Lynx color handheld (1989) and the 3DO Interactive Multiplayer (1993).

He also worked on arcade video games at Williams Electronics, was the chief architect of the Fathammer mobile game engine, and was at Sony Computer Entertainment from 2005 to 2011 as a senior manager on the PlayStation product line. In 2012, he was hired by Google.

A 1995 article in Next Generation commented "It's true that of the machines that Mical and Needle have created, only the Amiga has been a true global mass market hit ... But it's only fair to put forward the argument that this is down to the marketing of the machines rather than the quality of the product."

== Biography ==
Robert J. Mical graduated in 1979 from the University of Illinois with dual degrees in Computer Science and English and a minor in Philosophy.

From 1983 to 1984, Mical was software engineer at arcade video game and pinball creator Williams Electronics. He worked on special effects for Sinistar (1983) and coordinated the Star Rider LaserDisc racing project.

From 1984 to 1986, Mical worked for Amiga Corporation and then Commodore International on the development of the Amiga 1000 and later models. He created various development tools and the animation system software. He developed Intuition, the Amiga user interface system software.

From 1987 to 1989, he was vice-president of game technology at Epyx, reuniting with two ex-Amiga employees: Dave Needle and Dave Morse. He co-developed the first color handheld console, internally named "Handy." He was the co-designer of the hardware and put together run-time libraries, a debugger, art and audio tools, and an emulator. The system was acquired by Atari Corporation and brought to market as the Atari Lynx in 1989. He did some design for the launch titles Blue Lightning and Electrocop.

In 1990, Mical co-founded New Technology Group (NTG), a company established to create a new game system, working again with Needle and Morse. Mical co-designed the hardware and headed the creation of the system's multitasking operating system, Portfolio. The company later merged with The 3DO Company and their technology became the base of the 32-bit console 3DO Interactive Multiplayer.

From 1996 to 2005, Mical worked on mobile and online projects. In 1996 and 1997, Mical was part of the creation of a joint company effort, joining Prolific and founding Glassworks, which developed online games. In 1998 and 1999, he was as consultant for Rjave. In 2000 and 2001, he was vice president of software at Red Jade which was developing a handheld console. In 2001 and 2002, he was chief architect of Fathammer, a company which provided software development and runtime technology for the creation of 3D games on mobile phones. In 2003 and 2004, Mical was the vice president of software at Global VR, a company that created arcade versions of home games.

From 2005 to 2011, he was employed by Sony Computer Entertainment working on developer tools for the PlayStation 3 and PlayStation Vita. Since 2011 he has worked on software games and inventions with his own company, Arjinx. He was hired to be Director of Games at Google in 2012.
