= Mickey Mouse: The Computer Game =

1988 video game

- Developer: Gremlin Graphics
- Publisher: Gremlin Graphics
- Programmers: Bill Allen; Stuart Gregg; Gary Priest
- Artists: Kevin Bulmer; Jon Harrison
- Composers: Ben Daglish; Colin Dooley
- Platforms: Amiga, Amstrad CPC, Atari ST, Commodore 64, ZX Spectrum
- Release: EU: 1988
- Genre: Action

Mickey Mouse: The Computer Game, also known as just Mickey Mouse, is an action game developed and published by Gremlin Graphics in 1988 for the Amiga, Amstrad CPC, Atari ST, Commodore 64, and ZX Spectrum.

== Plot ==
Mickey Mouse needs to find and destroy the four evil witches who have stolen Merlin's wand. To do so he must reach the top of each tower of the enchanted castle. After that, Mickey can defeat the evil Ogre King to free Disneyland from an evil spell.

== Reception ==
Reception

Award
Publication	Award
Crash	Smash

The game received mostly positive reviews:

- ACE: 790/1000 (ST)
- Commodore Computing International: 50% (C64)
- Commodore User: 8/10 (C64)
- Computer & Video Games: 7/10 (C64), 8/10 (ST)
- Crash Smash award
- The Games Machine: 65% (C64), 85% (CPC), 89% (ST), 87% (ZX)
- Zzap!64: 85% (Amiga), 72% (C64)
