= Todd's Adventures in Slime World =

1990 video game

- Atari Lynx cover art in all regions
- Developers: Epyx; ISC (PCE Super CD-ROM²)
- Publishers: Atari Corporation: Lynx; JP: Mumin Corporation Genesis; JP: Micro World; NA: Renovation Products PC Engine Super CD-ROM²; JP: Micro World
- Programmer: Peter M. Engelbrite
- Artists: Matthew Crysdale; Phillip Vaughan
- Composers: Christopher Grigg; Eric VanRhee
- Platforms: Atari Lynx, Genesis, PC Engine Super CD-ROM²
- Release: August 25, 1990: Lynx; JP: August 25, 1990; NA: October 1990; EU: 1990 Genesis; JP: April 30, 1992; NA: June 1992 PC Engine Super CD-ROM²; JP: October 9, 1992
- Genre: Metroidvania
- Modes: Single-player, multiplayer

Todd's Adventures in Slime World is a 1990 Metroidvania video game developed by Epyx and published by Atari Corporation for the Atari Lynx. The Sega Genesis and PC Engine Super CD-ROM² versions followed in 1992, both of which were released by Micro World.

== Gameplay ==
Atari Lynx version screenshot.

The main character of the game is Todd the explorer, who enters Slime World to search for gems. Todd starts the game with a water pistol and computer generated map. Players in Slime World are armed with a water cannon that can be fired at many angles and can kill most enemies in one hit, cling to and climb most walls, and perform high and long jumps. Although nominally an action game, many rooms require knowledge of the player's abilities and can only be navigated in certain ways, frequently giving it an air of a puzzle game.

Todd can sustain ordinary damage from many sources, but there are invulnerability shields and pools of water that remove all damage taken when used. Red enemies, when shot, release a spray of red slime that can instantly kill even a shielded player, creating circumstances when it is best not to shoot foes.

There is also a type of enemy called a Hidden Snapper, that instantly kills players that step over it. Snappers are often undetectable until triggered, though subtle design cues hint at their location. Players (usually) have infinite lives to explore the world, but lose all their inventory items if Todd dies and are also sent back to the last checkpoint arrow passed.

== Plot ==
Todd is a galactic explorer who, while in the Andromeda sector, discovered a starship and downloaded part of the captain's log. The log contains information on Slime World, a world teeming with disgusting life forms and the presence of valuable slime gems.

=== Multiplayer ===
In the multiplayer scenario, there is one single seater escape capsule, and the players must fight each other to get to it first.

== Variations ==
The game contains seven "levels" that are more akin to game variations, each possessing not just its own map but its own variation on the basic rules. The variations are:

- Easy: A relatively simple mode with little red slime or snapjaws, good for learning the game.
- Exploration: Players are given a huge map with a great number of secret passages, and many enemies.
- Action: The hardest level in terms of enemy opposition.
- Logic: A slower-paced, solo-only mode in which the water gun does not work. Players must instead avoid, dodge or outrun foes, or find other ways of defeating them like mega bombs. While checkpoint arrows work, everything else in the world is reset when Todd dies.
- Suspense: The player is given a severe time limit within which to escape Slime World. It starts at 3 minutes, but it can be extended by one minute for each mushroom collected. While the route to the exit is mostly linear, there are a number of false routes to confound players.
- Combat: Most of the modes can be played cooperatively, but this one is competitive. Everyone gets five lives, and the last player in the game wins. Players may find slime guns to replace their water guns, that are capable of directly harming the other players. There are also other weapons to use, with room-destroying mega bombs at the top of the list. The Combat map is also just as packed with environmental dangers as the other modes.
- Arcade: The greatest challenge of Slime World, in this mode the map is almost as dangerous as Action, but the checkpoint arrows do not work. While the map is shorter than some of the other modes, it is still fairly substantial, and the player must start over from the beginning every time a life is lost. In the Lynx version of the game, there are multiple exits from the map. Continuing past the first few exits, the automap will show that the floor layout spells "GREEN TODD: OPT 1". This is an hint for an Easter egg in the game: the "Zit popping game". In the Easter egg, game players must repeatedly press the A button to make a slime bubble grow. If the player is fast enough the slime bubble will explode in hundreds of slime drops.

== Development ==
Peter Engelbrite, who worked for Epyx, one of the programming divisions at Atari, stated in his interview with Retro Gamer Magazine that "I saw that many of the movies for kids around that time had at least some slime in them" and commented that it was the "current craze" in the 1990s. Engelbrite went on to develop the game, which also included the option to link up eight Atari Lynx machines through its Comlynx system. This was then credited to be the first eight-player game ever created, and the only eight-player game on the Lynx.

Matt Householder of Epyx was charged with porting the game from the Lynx to Sega Genesis and PC Engine CD. The Genesis and PC Engine CD versions were changed to two-player split-screen, had different sound tracks and the map moved to the top right corner.

== Reception ==
=== Lynx ===
Lynx reviews

Review scores
Publication	Score
AllGame	4/5
Computer and Video Games	90/100
Electronic Gaming Monthly	5/10, 6/10, 7/10, 8/10
IGN	7/10
Raze	92%

In a capsule review of the Lynx version for STart, Clayton Walnum called the game "Wonderfully gross" and "a guaranteed hit." CVG Magazine reviewed the game in their January 1991 issue calling it a "superb exploration game", "highly original", "with plenty of long-lasting appeal".

Robert A. Jung reviewed the Atari Lynx version of the game in IGN. In his final verdict, he stated that "Todd's Adventures in Slime World will appeal mostly to players who enjoy the idea of exploring every nook and cranny of its vast, gooey terrain. For others, however, the appeal is not as distinct; depending on personal preferences and the availability of friends, the value of this card will vary significantly." He gave the game 7 out of 10.

Marshal Rosenthal reviewed the game in the short-lived Raze Magazine, giving a score of 92%.

=== Genesis ===
Genesis reviews

Review scores
Publication	Score
Electronic Gaming Monthly	4/10, 7/10, 6/10, 8/10
Mega Action	48%

N. Somniac of GamePro characterized the Genesis version as "a faithful translation" of the Lynx version which benefits from the large screen presentation. He was especially impressed that the multiplayer mode was adapted to split-screen format without significant slowdown or reduction in graphic quality. Additionally praising the convenience of the restart/password feature and the variety of gameplay possibilities resulting from the many features, he concluded, "Sharp graphics, an engaging story line, and a nice mixture of action and suspense guarantees a messy, but fun-filled, time for all!" Most of the four reviewers of Electronic Gaming Monthly agreed that the Genesis version improved on the presentation of the Lynx original, though Martin Alessi contended the controls are not nearly as good, affecting the playability. Steve Harris found the essential gameplay concept "awkward and flat", while Ed Semrad and Sushi-X had more positive reactions, praising the long levels and challenge. Mega Action gave a negative review writing: "The sound is poor and the graphics are small and untidy" and felt one of the major problems with Slime World is the lack of variety between levels.

In a 2006 retrospective review, Benjamin Galway of Sega-16 stated that the Genesis version's reduction of the multiplayer mode from eight players to two, along with its addition of an ever-present map to eliminate any possibility of getting lost, takes away most of the game's appeal. He also stated that the background graphics, animations, and color palette are inferior to the Lynx version's, and while the play control is the same, this is not a positive since the original had clunky and unnatural control. He nonetheless gave it a 7 out of 10.

=== Awards ===
Todd's Adventures in Slime World was awarded Game Players Magazine' game of the year.
