= Ben Daglish =

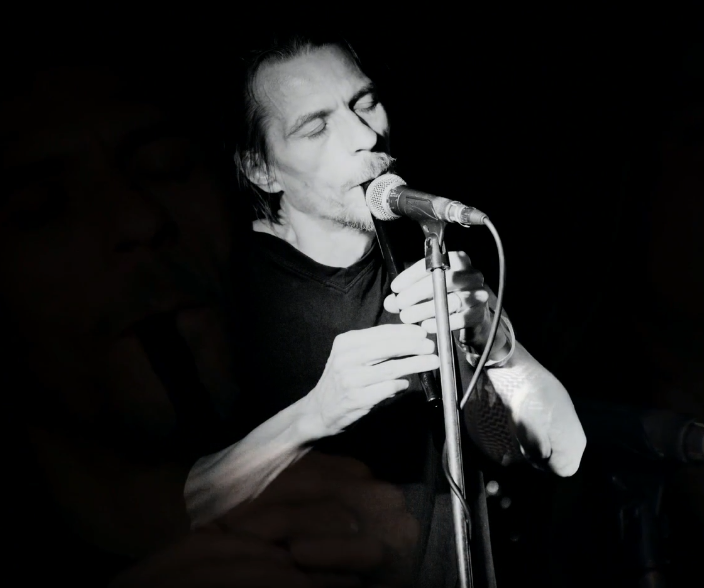
- Ben Daglish performance: Wastelands loader (The Last Ninja) (Underworld, 2016) Photo by Jason Moon

Background information
- Also known as: Benn
- Born: 31 July 1966; London, England
- Died: 1 October 2018 (aged 52)
- Genres: Soundtracks
- Occupation: Composer

Ben Daglish (31 July 1966 – 1 October 2018) was an English composer and musician. Born in London, his parents moved to Sheffield when he was one year old. He was known for creating many soundtracks for home computer games during the 1980s, such as The Last Ninja, Trap, Krakout, and Deflektor. Daglish teamed up with fellow C64 musician and prolific programmer Tony Crowther, forming W.E.M.U.S.I.C., which stood for "We Make Use of Sound in Computers". Daglish had attended the same school as Crowther, Bradfield Comprehensive School. Daglish mostly worked freelance but was employed by Gremlin Graphics for a couple of years.

== Biography ==
Daglish lived in Derbyshire where he composed, played and performed in a number of UK bands, including Loscoe State Opera. He also regularly performed with violinist Mark Knight and the band SID80s at retro computer game events such as Back in Time Live and Retrovision. He had also performed with Commodore 64 revival band Press Play On Tape together with Rob Hubbard. He was a fan of the late Ronnie Hazlehurst, a prolific composer for television. He died from complications from lung cancer on 1 October 2018.

== Compositions ==
=== Amstrad CPC ===
- Basil the Great Mouse Detective
- Dark Fusion (1988 – Gremlin Graphics Software)
- Deflektor (1987 – Vortex Software)
- H.A.T.E. – Hostile All Terrain Encounter (1989 – Vortex Software)
- Mask (1987 – Gremlin Graphics Software)
- Mask II (1988 – Gremlin Graphics Software)
- Masters of the Universe (Les Maitres De L'Univers) (1987 – Gremlin Graphics Software)
- North Star (1988 – Gremlin Graphics Software)
- Skate Crazy (1988 – Gremlin Graphics Software)
- Supercars (1990 – Gremlin Graphics Software)
- Switch Blade (1990 – Gremlin Graphics Software)
- Terramex a.k.a. Cosmic Relief: Prof. Renegade to the Rescue (1988 – Grandslam)
- The Real Stunt Experts (1989 – Alternative Software)
- Thing Bounces Back (1987 – Gremlin Graphics Software)

=== Atari ST ===
- 3D Galax (1987)
- Action Fighter (1986)
- Artura (1988)
- Axel's Magic Hammer (1989)
- Blasteroids (1989)
- Butcher Hill (1989)
- California Games (1989)
- Captain America - Defies the Doom Tube (1988)
- Chase H.Q. (1989)
- Chubby Gristle (1988)
- Continental Circus (1989)
- Cosmic Relief (1987)
- Dark Fusion (1988)
- Deflektor (1988)
- Dynamite Düx (1988)
- FoFT - Federation of Free Traders (1989)
- Footballer of the Year 2 (1989)
- Gary Lineker's Hot Shots
- Greg Norman's Ultimate Golf (1990)
- H.A.T.E. – Hostile All Terrain Encounter (1989)
- Hot Rod (1990)
- John Lowe's Ultimate Darts (1989)
- Kingmaker (1993)
- Legends of Valour (1993)
- Lotus Esprit Turbo Challenge (1990)
- Masters of the Universe (1988)
- Mickey Mouse: The Computer Game (1988)
- Monty Python's Flying Circus (1990)
- Motor Massacre (1988)
- Motörhead (1992)
- North Star (1988)
- Pac-Mania (1989)
- Passing Shot (1988)
- Prison (1989)
- Rick Dangerous (1989)
- Rick Dangerous 2 (1990)
- Road Raider (1988)
- Saint & Greavsie (1989)
- Skidz (1990)
- Super Cars (1989)
- Super Scramble Simulator (1989)
- Switchblade (1989)
- Terramex (1987)
- The Flintstones (1988)
- The Munsters (1988)
- The Running Man (1989)
- Thunderbirds (1989)
- Wizard Warz (1987)
- Xybots (1989)

=== Commodore 64 ===
- 720°
- Ark Pandora
- Alternative World Games
- Artura
- Auf Wiedersehen Monty (with Rob Hubbard)
- Avenger
- Basil the Great Mouse Detective
- Biggles
- Blasteroids
- Blood Brothers
- Blood Valley
- Bobby Bearing
- Bulldog
- Bombo
- Challenge of the Gobots
- Chubby Gristle
- Cobra (arrangement of the unused movie theme "Skyline" by Sylvester Levay)
- Dark Fusion
- Death Wish 3 (1987)
- Defenders of the Earth
- Deflektor
- Dogfight 2187
- Firelord (1986)
- Footballer of the Year
- Footballer of the Year 2
- Future Knight
- Future Knight II
- Gary Lineker's Hot Shot
- Gary Lineker's Super Skills
- Gauntlet and Gauntlet II
- Greg Norman's Ultimate Golf
- Hades Nebula
- Harvey Headbanger
- He-Man and the Masters of the Universe
- Heroes of the Lance
- Jack the Nipper
- Jack the Nipper II
- Kettle
- Killer-Ring
- Krakout
- L.O.C.O.
- Mask III – Venom Strikes Back
- Mickey Mouse
- Mountie Mick's Death Ride
- Munsters
- Northstar
- Olli and Lissa
- Pac-Mania
- Percy the Potty Pigeon
- Potty Pidgeon (Death tune only)
- Pub Games
- Re-Bounder
- Real Stunt Experts
- Return of the Mutant Camels
- Skate Crazy
- SkateRock
- Super Cars
- Supersports
- Switchblade
- TechnoCop
- They Stole a Million
- Thing Bounces Back
- Terramex
- The Flintstones
- The Last Ninja (with Anthony Lees)
- Trap
- Vikings
- Way of the Tiger
- William Wobbler
- Wizard Warz
- Zarjaz

Source: The High Voltage SID Collection

=== Amiga ===
- Artura (1989)
- Chubby Gristle (1988)
- Deflektor (1988)
- Federation of Free Traders (1989)
- Pac-Mania (1988, re-arrangement of arcade game tunes)
- Switchblade (1989)
- Corporation (1990)
- Super Cars (1990)

=== ZX Spectrum ===
- Artura (1989)
- Auf Wiedersehen Monty (1987)
- Avenger (1986)
- Blasteroids (1987)
- Blood Brothers (1988)
- Blood Valley (1987)
- Butcher Hill (1989)
- Challenge of the Gobots (1987)
- Chubby Gristle (1988)
- Dark Fusion (1988)
- Death Wish 3 (1987)
- Deflektor (1988)
- The Flintstones (1988)
- Footballer of the Year (1987)
- Future Knight (1987)
- Gary Lineker's Hot Shots (1988)
- Gary Lineker's Super Skills (1988)
- Gauntlet 2 (1988)
- H.A.T.E. – Hostile All Terrain Encounter (1989)
- Jack the Nipper 2: in Coconut Capers (1987)
- Krakout (1987)
- Mask 1, Mask 2 (1988)
- MASK III: Venom Strikes Back (1988)
- Masters of the Universe (1987)
- Mickey Mouse (1988)
- Moley Christmas (1987)
- Motor Massacre (1989)
- Mountie Mick's Death Ride
- North Star (1988)
- Pacmania (1988)
- The Real Stunt Experts
- Skate Crazy (1988)
- Super Scramble Simulator (1989)
- Super Sports
- Switchblade (1991)
- Techno Cop (1988)
- Terramex (1988)
- Thing Bounces Back (1987)
- Trap (128k) (1985)
- Wizard Wars
