= GamePC Consortium =

The GamePC Consortium was an ad hoc PC industry standards organisation in the mid-1990s. It was founded through the joint efforts of ATI's Ken Nicholson and Diamond Multimedia's Glenn Coffman. The two competing companies shared a common interest in the evolution of PC games and agreed that the PC graphics industry was limited by a lack of standards. At that time, the vast majority of games for PCs were written for MS-DOS and had no standardized way to access expanded memory, accelerated graphics or digital audio capabilities.

Based on the notion of "a rising tide lifts all boats", the two companies established the GamePC Consortium as a way for PC hardware manufacturers and PC game software publishers to combine their efforts to establish game API standards that would enable PCs to compete with successful console game systems such as the Sega Genesis.

The GamePC Consortium's member companies included 80 of the leading entertainment hardware and software PC companies of the time, including Intel, nVidia, Rendition, Sigma Designs, ATI, Diamond Multimedia, S3 Graphics, Trident, Cirrus Logic, Rendermorphics and Lucas Arts. Microsoft, most notably, refused to recognize the GamePC Consortium, though Alex St. John, Microsoft's first game evangelist, spoke at several of the meetings.

One of the consortium's early efforts resulted in establishing a 2D graphics 'manifesto' that called for the creation of a Windows graphics API that offered the following new capabilities:

- The ability for games to change the display mode of any supported display resolution or color-depth without requiring a system reboot.
- The ability for games to read and write graphics memory, including the framebuffer. This allowed the CPU to draw directly onto the screen, hence the origin of the name "DirectDraw." Direct access to screen memory was not possible under the Windows GDI architecture.
- The ability for games to allocate offscreen memory and to store graphics data in offscreen memory.
- The ability for games to make use of the blitter
- The ability for games to utilize page flipping
- Support for transparent blts as a technique for implementing 2D Sprite (computer graphics)

The consortium expressed its intent to create such an industry standard API for Windows if Microsoft did not. Microsoft embraced all of the proposed features of the manifesto and added considerably more with the first release of DirectDraw in DirectX 1.0.

The GamePC Consortium was significant in being one of the early examples of an industry consortium influencing the development of a standard API in the otherwise proprietary Windows operating system. It was also significant in prompting the game industry's rapid adoption of the nascent DirectX standard.

The GamePC Consortium disbanded when it became clear that Microsoft had begun to undertake the architectural, technical and marketing responsibilities necessary to further Windows game standards. In 2008, a similar organization called the PC Gaming Alliance was formed.
