= Open Gaming Alliance =

Non-profit organization

The Open Gaming Alliance was a non-profit organization of hardware manufacturers, game developers, game publishers and others, with the goal of promoting and advancing the PC as a gaming platform.

== Background ==
The originally named PC Gaming Alliance was announced during the Game Developers Conference 2008. In 2014, the PC Gaming Alliance changed its name to the Open Gaming Alliance to encompass all mainstream non-console gaming platforms, including Windows, OS X, SteamOS, Linux, desktops, laptops, and tablets.

As of 2025, the official Open Gaming Alliance website has been non functional since 2018.

== Goals and activities ==
The OGA was working to develop marketing for PC games, combat piracy, develop new business models beyond retail sales, and establish minimum hardware requirements for computer games, along with guidelines for developers to make games work for those requirements. According to former president Randy Stude, the PC Gaming Alliance is to "help make certain that the PC game industry had a public voice and a pulpit for accurately communicating the size, growth and overall popularity of the single largest gaming platform worldwide." They also performed market research for their members and the public.

== Members ==
- Dell
- Arxan Technologies
- Cloud Imperium Games
- Corsair Components Inc
- Digital River
- DinoPC
- EMA
- Intel Corp.
- Lenovo
- Nexosis
- Razer USA Ltd.
- Ubisoft
- Unity
- Webroot

== Former members ==
- 38 Studios
- Acer Inc./Gateway, Inc.
- AMD
- Antec
- BFG Technologies
- Bigfoot Networks
- Epic Games
- Flextronics
- GameStop
- GameTap
- Gas Powered Games
- Howie's Game Shack
- InstantAction
- Logitech
- Microsoft
- Nvidia
- Pyxel Arts Digital Entertainment S.L.
- Sony DADC
- Southern Methodist University Guildhall
- WildTangent

== See also ==
- Games for Windows
- GamePC Consortium—a similar organization formed in the mid-1990s
- Multimedia PC, an early effort by the SPA to define levels of PC hardware capabilities
