= Corporation (video game) =

1990 video game

- European home computer box art
- Developers: Synthetic Dimensions; Core Design (DOS & Genesis)
- Publishers: Core Design (European Amiga & Atari ST); Virgin Games (DOS & Genesis)
- Designer: Kevin Bulmer
- Programmer: Bill Allen
- Composer: Ben Daglish
- Platforms: Amiga, Atari ST, MS-DOS, Mega Drive/Genesis
- Release: 1990 (Amiga and Atari ST); 1991 (MS-DOS); 1992 (Mega Drive/Genesis)
- Genres: Role-playing, first-person shooter
- Mode: Single player

Corporation (released as Cyber-Cop in North America) is a video game for Amiga, Atari ST and MS-DOS, later ported to the Mega Drive/Genesis. It was developed for Core Design by Dimension Creative Designs by Bill Allen with graphics and design by Kevin Bulmer.

The PC and Sega versions were published by Virgin Games. Originally released for Amiga in 1990, it is one of the earliest 3D first-person shooter games, predating id Software's Wolfenstein 3D (1992). It was also the first of its kind to utilize dynamic lighting. Gameplay was very complex for its time, featuring role-playing, stealth and hacking elements, similar to the later immersive sims System Shock and Deus Ex series of games.

== Plot ==
Corporation is set in a dark future, and centers around the Universal Cybernetics Corporation, or U.C.C., responsible for employing a large percentage of the population of London and is a keystone in the stability of the economy, thus controlling the government's popularity. U.C.C.'s London headquarters' factory is under the government suspicion of illegally producing genetically engineered hostile mutants. The U.C.C. is a successful "corporation" that works with pride on (legal) genetic experiments, cybernetic implants and body modifications. Recently, however, one of the U.C.C.'s experiments has escaped and is wreaking havoc on London, which is where the player comes in, taking control of a national security spy (or a "cyber cop" in the North American Genesis version) working for the agency known as ZODIAC, assigned to infiltrate and expose the illegal activity.

Corporation is an early example of a 3D first person shooter.

== Gameplay ==
The player is given the option of choosing between one of six agents (two men, two women, and two androids, each with variable ability and skill levels). The game is played in a first-person perspective, rendered with 3D polygon environments. The agent lands on the building's roof with the goal of progressing from the fifth floor down to the basement on level eight. The mission involves the search of incriminating evidence, which would allow the authorities to shut down the illegal genetic experiments taking place.

Game elements include hacking electronic door locks from terminals, avoiding alarm triggers and security cameras, battling enemies, and staying alive through the planned use of the items bought in advance before the mission. The conservation of energy is key, but more batteries can be found as floor pick-up items. In a special menu the player is able to heal wounds on specific parts of body, manage various electronic devices scattered throughout the game, apply body modifications and other items, and gather information. In order to reach lower floors, the player must locate special key cards or terminals to acquire higher security clearances to operate the elevators. The Amiga and Atari ST version also had customisable content: a suitable registration card with a request could be sent to Core containing details of the player and a passport-sized photograph attached. Core would then send the player a floppy diskette containing the sent data that could then be loaded after inserting and loading the data from the first disk.

== Expansion ==
In 1991, an expansion pack with 16 new levels titled the Corporation Mission Disk was released for the Amiga & Atari ST.

== Reception ==
The game received very high marks in magazines but had problems with the blocky controls, non-textured polygon surfaces, high difficulty, and realism.
