= Dave Needle =

American computer engineer (1947–2016)

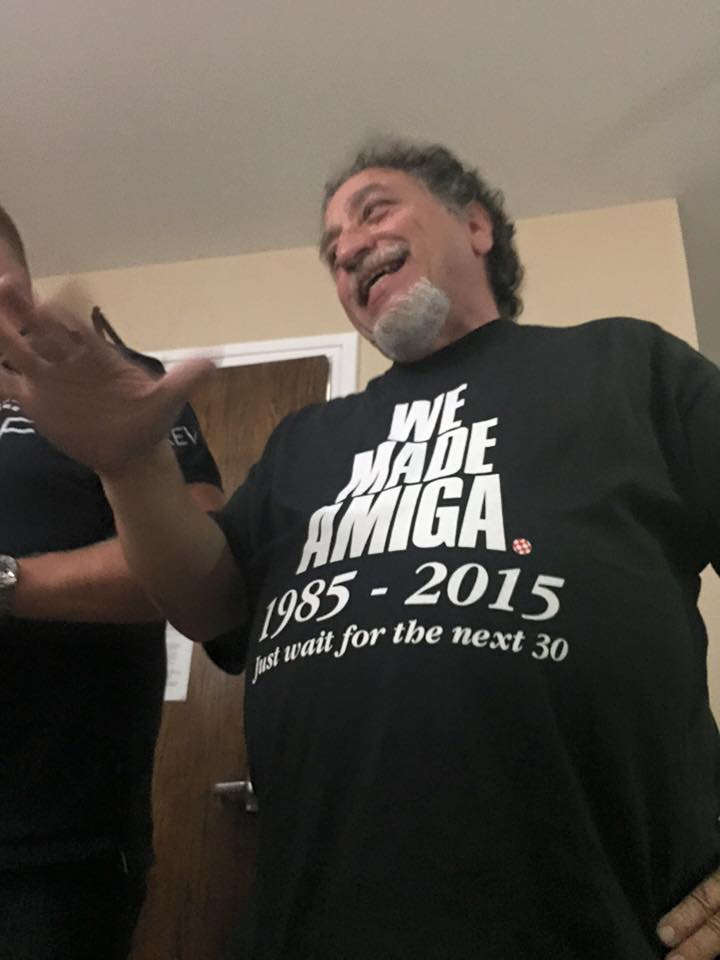
- Needle in 2016
- Born: David Lewis Needle; December 17, 1947; New York City, New York, U.S.
- Died: February 20, 2016 (aged 68); Alameda, California, U.S.
- Occupation: Hardware engineer

David Lewis Needle (December 17, 1947 – February 20, 2016) was an American computer engineer. He was a key engineer and co-chief architect in the creation of the Amiga 1000 computer with Jay Miner, Dave Morse, and RJ Mical. He was one of the main designers and developers of the custom chips of the Amiga computer. Later he co-invented the Atari Lynx handheld game system and the 3DO console with Morse and Mical.

A 1995 article in Next Generation commented: "It's true that of the machines that Mical and Needle have created, only the Amiga has been a true global mass market hit ... But it's only fair to put forward the argument that this is down to the marketing of the machines rather than the quality of the product."

Dave Needle died on February 20, 2016 at age 68.
