= Clayton Walnum =

Clayton Walnum is a programmer who has written multiple books about programming in C#, DirectX and C++.

Clayton Walnum started programming computers in 1982, when he traded an IBM Selectric typewriter to buy an Atari 400 computer with 16K of RAM. He was hired as a Technical Editor for Atari 8-bit magazine ANALOG Computing in 1985, eventually becoming Executive Editor before leaving in 1989, the year the publication folded. He authored a number of type-in games for ANALOG, including Dragonlord (1985) and Moonlord (1986), mostly written in Atari BASIC.

Walnum has since acquired a degree in computer science, and written over 30 books (translated into many languages). He is also the author of hundreds of magazine articles and software reviews, as well as a large number of programs.

== Books ==
- Microsoft Direct3D Programming: Kick Start
- Sams Teach Yourself Game Programming With Directx in 21 Days
- C# for Visual Basic Programmers
- Sams Teach Yourself Game Programming With Visual Basic in 21 Days
- C++ Master Reference
- Visual Basic 6: Master Reference
- The Complete Idiot's Guide to Visual Basic 6
- QBASIC for Rookies
