= STart =

- June 1990 cover
- First issue: Summer 1986
- Final issue Number: April/May 1991; 42
- Company: Antic Publishing
- Country: United States

STart was a computer magazine covering the Atari ST published from Summer 1986 through April/May 1991—42 issues total. STart began as sections of Atari 8-bit magazine Antic, before being spun off into a separate publication. Its primarily competitor ST-Log was similarly spawned by ANALOG Computing. Each issue of STart included a cover disk.

== See also ==
- Atari ST User, A British Atari ST magazine
- Page 6, Long-running Atari magazine for 8-bit and ST machines
