= Episodic video game =

Type of video game where gameplay is split up into individual playthroughs

An episodic video game is a video game of a shorter length that is commercially released as an installment to a continuous and larger series. Episodic games differ from conventional video games in that they often contain less content but are developed on a more frequent basis.

Such a series may or may not have continuity, but will always share settings, characters, and/or themes. Episodic production in this manner has become increasingly popular among video game developers since the advent of low-cost digital distribution systems, which can immensely reduce their distribution overhead and make episodes financially viable. Alternatively, it can be used to describe the narrative of the game. Examples of episodic video games include most Telltale games, Alan Wake, BioShock Infinite: Burial at Sea, Grand Theft Auto: Episodes from Liberty City, Life Is Strange, Resident Evil: Revelations (and Revelations 2), Half-Life 2: Episode One (and Two), Star Trek Online and Deltarune.

== Concept ==
To consumers, episodic games are very similar in nature to expansion packs. An expansion is an add-on to an original, non-episodic product however; something of a lower order. In an episodic series there is no dominant '"first" game': each installment, although perhaps of the same length and price point as an expansion, is a main event that drives the core experience forward. This particular aspect of this type of game underpins the developer focus on the game's story.

In terms of the narrative framework, episodic games tend to end in cliffhangers because it serves as a tool to deploy a seamless transition. These scenes are also dramatic, drawing the interest of the players so that they anxiously await for the next installment.

== Single-player episodic gaming ==
The first episodic game appeared in 1979. Automated Simulations' Dunjonquest series started with Temple of Apshai, and in the same year several mini-episodes using the same game system and world were released. The sequel Hellfire Warrior and several full-sized add-on packs for both main games followed 1980–1982. Wizardry was likewise appended with additional scenarios that allowed importing of the first games' save data.

Following Nihon Falcom's 1986 expansion pack Xanadu Scenario II for the 1985 action role-playing game Dragon Slayer II: Xanadu, the fifth Dragon Slayer title Sorcerian in 1987 introduced a scenario system where the player can play through fifteen scenarios in their order of choice. Soon after, additional expansion packs were released containing a number of new scenarios. The game introduced an aging system, where one or more years pass by and the characters age during each scenario, with the additional scenario packs in mind. That same year saw the beginning of the Kroz series, a seven-part series of games featuring similar text-based graphics and gameplay, with renewed levels. These were not released on a regular schedule, but were sold in packages, with the first episode being available freely as shareware. During 1993-1994, the Italian publisher Simulmondo published several games in bite-sized episodes, among them the comic book adaption Diabolik (11 Episodes) and the original series Time Runners (30 Episodes).

Adventure games Shin Onigashima, Yūyūki, and Famicom Tantei Club series for the Family Computer Disk System were released in two disks, with both disks being separate releases but forming a single game.

Single-player games, particularly real-time strategy games and first-person shooters, have in the past experimented with a limited form of episodic gaming, by adding new stages, levels, weapons, enemies or missions with expansion packs. Early examples include Wing Commander: Secret Ops, which was released episodically over the internet in 1998. However, this series was a failure and was discontinued after it failed to attract significant player numbers. One of the contributing factors was its 120 MB download size, which may have been prohibitively large in an age in which 56k internet access was the norm. Limitations in bandwidth have also been cited as one of the reasons for the failure of the episodic alternate reality game Majestic, as it required an initial download of an hour or more on a dial-up connection.

Another example of a more casual episodic game is Goodnight Mister Snoozleberg!, an online game created by Sarbakan that was released in 1999 on TF1's website, later on CBC and now available for download on Trygames. El Dorado's Gate was a Japan-only episodic game released by Capcom in 2001.

Kuma Reality Games has developed first-person shooter episodic games since its inception in 2003. Some of the "game-isodes" that the company has developed include The DinoHunters, which documents a group of off-key time travelers hunting dinosaurs and other prehistoric beasts, and the controversial Kuma\War, which focuses on recent military action in the world, especially in Iraq and Afghanistan. Recently, Kuma Games produced a series mirroring The History Channel's Shootout! series. The games created were modeled on the battles featured in the TV show, adding another level of media depth to episodic gaming in general.

From 1994 to 2000, the world's first digital satellite radio broadcaster, St.GIGA, transmitted episodic video games with voice acted overdubs (a technique called SoundLink), to be played in Japan on partner Nintendo's Super Famicom video game console with its Satellaview peripheral. The first SoundLink title, BS Zelda no Densetsu, was released in four discrete broadcast episodes starting in August 1995. Nintendo has said it to be the world's first integrated radio-game.

Shining Force III is a three-part RPG released by Sega for the Sega Saturn between 1997 and 1999. The narrative of the game was distributed through three distinct "scenarios", each showing a part of the complete story.

Other games have contemplated going the route of episodic development and distribution, only to decide against it. Examples of this include Quantic Dream's Fahrenheit, Ubisoft's Rayman Origins, and a planned series of episodes starring Duke Nukem by ARUSH Entertainment.

Valve's Steam platform is being used as a content delivery platform for several episodic games including Half-Life 2 Episodes developed by Valve themselves.

Telltale Games is one of the heaviest supporters of episodic gaming thus far, as well as its successor, AdHoc Studio, after its closure. Their game Bone is an adventure title that literally adapts chapters from Jeff Smith's Bone comic book saga into game episodes on a periodic basis, with two episodes having been released. Telltale's Sam & Max Save the World was their first fully completed episodic series, followed by Sam & Max Beyond Time and Space and Sam & Max: The Devil's Playhouse. Other series based on various other franchises include Strong Bad's Cool Game for Attractive People, Wallace and Gromit's Grand Adventures, Tales of Monkey Island, Back to the Future: The Game and The Walking Dead.

Minerva is a single-player modification that has adopted an episodic development structure. It is one of the first mods to do so for Valve's Half-Life 2.

Turner Broadcasting's GameTap has made large investments in episodic game development. The online game service's first episodic game, Sam & Max, was co-published with Telltale Games. Each episode premiered on GameTap 14 days before becoming available on the Telltale Games web site. GameTap's second foray into episodic games was monthly content deliveries for Myst Online: Uru Live an online massive multiplayer game by Cyan Worlds. In February, GameTap announced a third episodic game, Galactic Command: Echo Squad, developed in conjunction with 3000AD. Their most recently announced game, the 24 episode American McGee's Grimm, was announced in May 2007 for an early 2008 launch. GameTap's VP of content, Ricardo Sanchez, has written for sites like Gamasutra and GameDaily and presented at the D.I.C.E. Summit on the subject. His "Three Laws of Episodics" lay out rules by which GameTap determines whether a title is episodic or not, and rules out Bone and Half-Life 2 Episodes due to the unknown duration of time between episodes.

Dimps and Sonic Team created the episodic video game, Sonic the Hedgehog 4 for various formats, the first episode of which was released in October 2010, with Episode 2 released in May 2012. A third episode was planned, but was canceled.

Joey Drew Studios Inc. released Chapter 1 of the horror game ‘’Bendy and the Ink Machine‘’ for free on Game Jolt and itch.io in February 2017. There were four additional paid chapters. Chapter 2 released on Game Jolt itch.io and Steam (alongside Chapter 1 on Steam) in April 2017, Chapter 3 released in September 2017, Chapter 4 released in April 2018, and Chapter 5 was released as part of the complete edition in October 2018.

Glowstick Entertainment created their first horror game ‘’Dark Deception‘’, releasing on Steam with Chapter 1 releasing in September 2018, Chapter 2 in January 2019, Chapter 3 in June 2019, Chapter 4 in September 2021, and Chapter 5 is scheduled to be released in 2026/2027.

Mob Entertainment created their first horror game, ‘’Poppy Playtime‘’ releasing on Steam with Chapter 1 in October 2021, Chapter 2 in May 2022, Chapter 3 in January 2024, Chapter 4 in January 2025, Chapter 5 being released in February 2026 & Chapter 6 Being Scheduled For 2027.

Telltale's episodic adventure games inspired Roy and Ronen Gluzman to revive their popular Israeli video game franchise Piposh with a four-part 2019 entry.

Deltarune is being released in an episodic format. The first two chapters of the game are available together as a free demo and were released in 2018 and 2021 respectively. The third and fourth chapters released in a paid format in 2025. The fifth chapter was released in 2026 as a free update for those who already had purchased the last two chapters. The game's menu implies there will be seven chapters, as does the ending of Chapter 5 when playing on the "weird route."

== Massively multiplayer online gaming ==
Since episodic gaming is mostly driven through linear storytelling, outside of story-driven single player games, it is mostly found in MMOGs. Much as they worked for offline games, expansion packs have often been sold to increase available content to MMOG players by adding additional worlds to explore and additional gameplay features, such as new weapons and characters.

As the term relates to this genre, episodes are typically contrasted to the traditional expansion pack, as in the Asheron's Call franchise, where episodic content was downloaded without an additional fee (to the standing subscription price). This included new expansive story arcs comparable to those found in offline RPGs and were updated on a bi-monthly basis. Retail expansion packs were still created for the Asheron's Call games.

Another MMOG featuring an episodic design is the Guild Wars series developed by ArenaNet. The company's business model involves releasing new, independent chapters for the game on a six-month basis. Since Guild Wars does not charge a monthly fee, and there is no requirement to own the newer chapters, it is one of the few games entirely reliant on the episodic games model to continue its service. To this end, Guild Wars Factions was released on April 28, 2006, which was subsequently followed by Guild Wars Nightfall, released worldwide on October 27, 2006, and finally Guild Wars Eye of the North on August 31, 2007.

== See also ==
- Gaiden

== Other sources ==
- Catalin Z. Alexandru [December 2006] "Episodic Gaming, fact or fiction". TheG33ks.
- Ricardo Sanchez [October 2006] "What is episodic?. GameDaily
- Jason Kraft and Chris Kwak (April 2006) "Episodic Gaming in the Age of Digital Distribution". GamaSutra.
- David Edery (April 2006) "In Defense of Episodic Content - A Response to the Above Article".
- Patrick Klepek (April 2006) "Bethesda Responds To Oblivion Issues" - Fan reaction to the Horse Armour expansion. 1UP.com
- N. Evan Van Zelfden (March 2006) "Dallas Developers: Ritual" - Steve Nix of Ritual Entertainment discusses Episodic delivery of Sin Episodes: Emergence. Next Generation
- Kris Graft (August 2005) Micropayments. Next Generation
- Ben Williamson (April 2003) "Episodic gaming" Futurelab
- Rojas, Peter (August 21, 2002). "But Serially, a Game in Episodes?". Wired.
- David Kushner (March 2002) " So What, Exactly, Do Online Gamers Want?" The New York Times
