= Adventure game =

Video game genre

Adventure games are a video game genre in which the player assumes the role of a protagonist in an interactive story, driven by exploration and/or puzzle-solving. The genre's focus on story allows it to draw heavily from other narrative-based media, such as literature and film, encompassing a wide variety of genres. Most adventure games (text and graphic) are designed for a single player, since the emphasis on story and character makes multiplayer design difficult. Colossal Cave Adventure is identified by Rick Adams as the first such adventure game, first released in 1976, while other notable adventure game series include Zork, King's Quest, Monkey Island, Syberia, and Myst.

Adventure games were initially developed in the 1970s and early 1980s as text-based interactive stories, using text parsers to translate the player's commands into actions. As personal computers became more powerful with better graphics, the graphic adventure-game format became popular, initially by augmenting player's text commands with graphics, but soon moving towards point-and-click interfaces. Further computer advances led to adventure games with more immersive graphics using real-time or pre-rendered three-dimensional scenes or full-motion video taken from the first- or third-person perspective. Currently, a large number of adventure games are available as a combination of different genres with adventure elements.

For markets in the Western hemisphere, the genre's popularity peaked during the late 1980s to mid-1990s when many considered it to be among the most technically advanced genres, but it had become a niche genre in the early 2000s due to the popularity of first-person shooters, and it became difficult for developers to find publishers to support adventure-game ventures. Since then, a resurgence in the genre has occurred, spurred on by the success of independent video-game development, particularly from crowdfunding efforts, from the wide availability of digital distribution enabling episodic approaches, and from the proliferation of new gaming platforms, including portable consoles and mobile devices.

Within Asian markets, adventure games continue to be popular in the form of visual novels, which make up nearly 70% of PC games released in Japan. Asian countries have also found markets for adventure games for portable and mobile gaming devices. Japanese adventure-games tend to be distinct, having a slower pace and revolving more around dialogue, whereas Western adventure-games typically emphasize more interactive worlds and complex puzzle solving, owing to them each having unique development histories.

== Definition ==
| Components of an adventure game | Ref. |
|---|---|
| Puzzle solving, or problem solving | |
| Exploration | |
| Narrative | |
| Player assumes the role of a character or hero | |
| Collection or manipulation of objects | |

The term "adventure game" originated from the 1970s text computer game Colossal Cave Adventure, often referred to simply as Adventure. It pioneered a style of gameplay that many developers imitated, and it became a genre in its own right. The video game genre is therefore defined by its gameplay, unlike the literary genre, which is defined by the subject it addresses: the activity of adventure.

Essential elements of the genre include storytelling, exploration, and puzzle-solving. Marek Bronstring, former head of content at Sega, has characterised adventure games as puzzles embedded in a narrative framework; such games may involve narrative content that a player unlocks piece by piece over time. While the puzzles that players encounter through the story can be arbitrary, those that do not pull the player out of the narrative are considered examples of good design.

=== Relationship to other genres ===
Combat and action challenges are limited or absent in adventure games; this distinguishes them from action games. In the book Andrew Rollings and Ernest Adams on Game Design, the authors state that: "this [reduced emphasis on combat] doesn't mean that there is no conflict in adventure games ... only that combat is not the primary activity." Some adventure games will include a minigame from another video game genre, which adventure game purists do not always appreciate. Hybrid action-adventure games blend the action and adventure genres throughout the game experience, incorporating more physical challenges than pure adventure games and having a faster pace. This definition is hard to apply, however, with some debate among designers about which games classify as action games and which involve enough non-physical challenges to be considered action-adventures.

Adventure games are also distinct from role-playing video games that involve action, team-building, and points management. Adventure games lack the numeric rules or relationships seen in role-playing games (RPGs), and seldom have an internal economy. These games lack any skill-system, combat, or "an opponent to be defeated through strategy and tactics". However, some hybrid games do exist and are referred to as either Adventure games or Role-playing games by the respective communities. Finally, adventure games are classified separately from puzzle video games. While puzzle video games revolve entirely around solving puzzles, adventure games revolve more around exploration and story, with puzzles typically scattered throughout the game.

== Game design ==
=== Puzzle-solving ===
Adventure games contain a variety of puzzles, including decoding messages, finding and using items, opening locked doors, or finding and exploring new locations. Solving a puzzle will unlock access to new areas in the game world, and reveal more of the game story. Conceptual Reasoning and Lateral Thinking Puzzles form the majority of the gameplay, where extrinsic knowledge gained in real life is expected to be known and used by the player to overcome the challenges. This sets the puzzles apart from Logic puzzles where all the information needed to solve said problem is presented within the context of the situation, such as combination locks or other machinery that the player must learn to manipulate, though lateral thinking and conceptual reasoning puzzles may include the use of logical thinking.

Some puzzles are criticized for the obscurity of their solutions, for example, the combination of a clothes line, clamp, and deflated rubber duck used to gather a key stuck between the subway tracks in The Longest Journey, which exists outside of the game's narrative and serves only as an obstacle to the player. Others have been criticized for requiring players to blindly guess, either by clicking on the right pixel, or by guessing the right verb in games that use a text interface. Games that require players to navigate mazes have also become less popular, although the earliest text-adventure games usually required players to draw a map if they wanted to navigate the abstract space.

=== Gathering and using items ===
Many adventure games make use of an inventory management screen as a distinct gameplay mode. Players are only able to pick up some objects in the game, so the player usually knows that only objects that can be picked up are important. Because it can be difficult for a player to know if they missed an important item, they will often scour every scene for items. For games that utilize a point and click interface, players will sometimes engage in a systematic search known as a "pixel hunt", trying to locate the small area on the graphic representation of the location on screen that the developers defined, which may not be obvious or only consist of a few on-screen pixels. A notable example comes from the original Full Throttle by LucasArts, where one puzzle requires instructing the character to kick a wall at a small spot, which Tim Schafer, the game's lead designer, had admitted years later was a brute force measure; in the remastering of the game, Schafer and his team at Double Fine made this puzzle's solution more obvious. More recent adventure games try to avoid pixel hunts by highlighting the item, or by snapping the player's cursor to the item.

Many puzzles in these games involve gathering and using items from their inventory. Players must apply lateral thinking techniques where they apply real-world extrinsic knowledge about objects in unexpected ways. For example, by putting a deflated inner tube on a cactus to create a slingshot, which requires a player to realize that an inner tube is stretchy. They may need to carry items in their inventory for a long duration before they prove useful, and thus it is normal for adventure games to test a player's memory where a challenge can only be overcome by recalling a piece of information from earlier in the game. There is seldom any time pressure for these puzzles, focusing more on the player's ability to reason than on quick-thinking.

=== Story, setting, and themes ===
Adventure games are single-player experiences that are largely story-driven. More than any other genre, adventure games depend upon their story and setting to create a compelling single-player experience. They are typically set in an immersive environment, often a fantasy world, and try to vary the setting from chapter to chapter to add novelty and interest to the experience. Comedy is a common theme, and games often script comedic responses when players attempt actions or combinations that are "ridiculous or impossible".

Since adventure games are driven by storytelling, character development usually follows literary conventions of personal and emotional growth, rather than new powers or abilities that affect gameplay. The player often embarks upon a quest, or is required to unravel a mystery or situation about which little is known. These types of mysterious stories allow designers to get around what Ernest W. Adams calls the "Problem of Amnesia", where the player controls the protagonist but must start the game without their knowledge and experience. Story-events typically unfold as the player completes new challenges or puzzles, but in order to make such storytelling less mechanical, new elements in the story may also be triggered by player movement.

=== Dialogue and conversation trees ===
Adventure games have strong storylines with significant dialog, and sometimes make effective use of recorded dialog or narration from voice actors. This genre of game is known for representing dialog as a conversation tree. Players are able to engage a non-player character by choosing a line of pre-written dialog from a menu, which triggers a response from the game character. These conversations are often designed as a tree structure, with players deciding between each branch of dialog to pursue. However, there are always a finite number of branches to pursue, and some adventure games devolve into selecting each option one-by-one. Conversing with characters can reveal clues about how to solve puzzles, including hints about what that character wants before they will cooperate with the player. Other conversations will have far-reaching consequences, deciding to disclose a valuable secret that has been entrusted to the player.

=== Goals, success and failure ===
The primary goal in adventure games is the completion of the assigned quest. Early adventure games often had high scores and some, including Zork and some of its sequels, assigned the player a rank, a text description based on their score. High scores provide the player with a secondary goal, and serve as an indicator of progression. While high scores are now less common, external reward systems, such as Xbox Live's Achievements, perform a similar role.

The primary failure condition in adventure games, inherited from more action-oriented games, is player death. Without the clearly identified enemies of other genres, its inclusion in adventure games is controversial, and many developers now either avoid it or take extra steps to foreshadow death. Some early adventure games trapped the players in unwinnable situations without ending the game. Infocom's text adventure The Hitchhiker's Guide to the Galaxy has been criticized for a scenario where failing to pick up a pile of junk mail at the beginning of the game prevented the player, much later, from completing the game. The adventure games developed by LucasArts purposely avoided creating a dead-end situation for the player due to the negative reactions to such situations, despite this, some fans of the genre enjoy dead ends and player death situations, resulting in divergent philosophies in adventure games and how to handle player risk-reward.

== Subgenres ==
=== Text adventures and interactive fiction ===
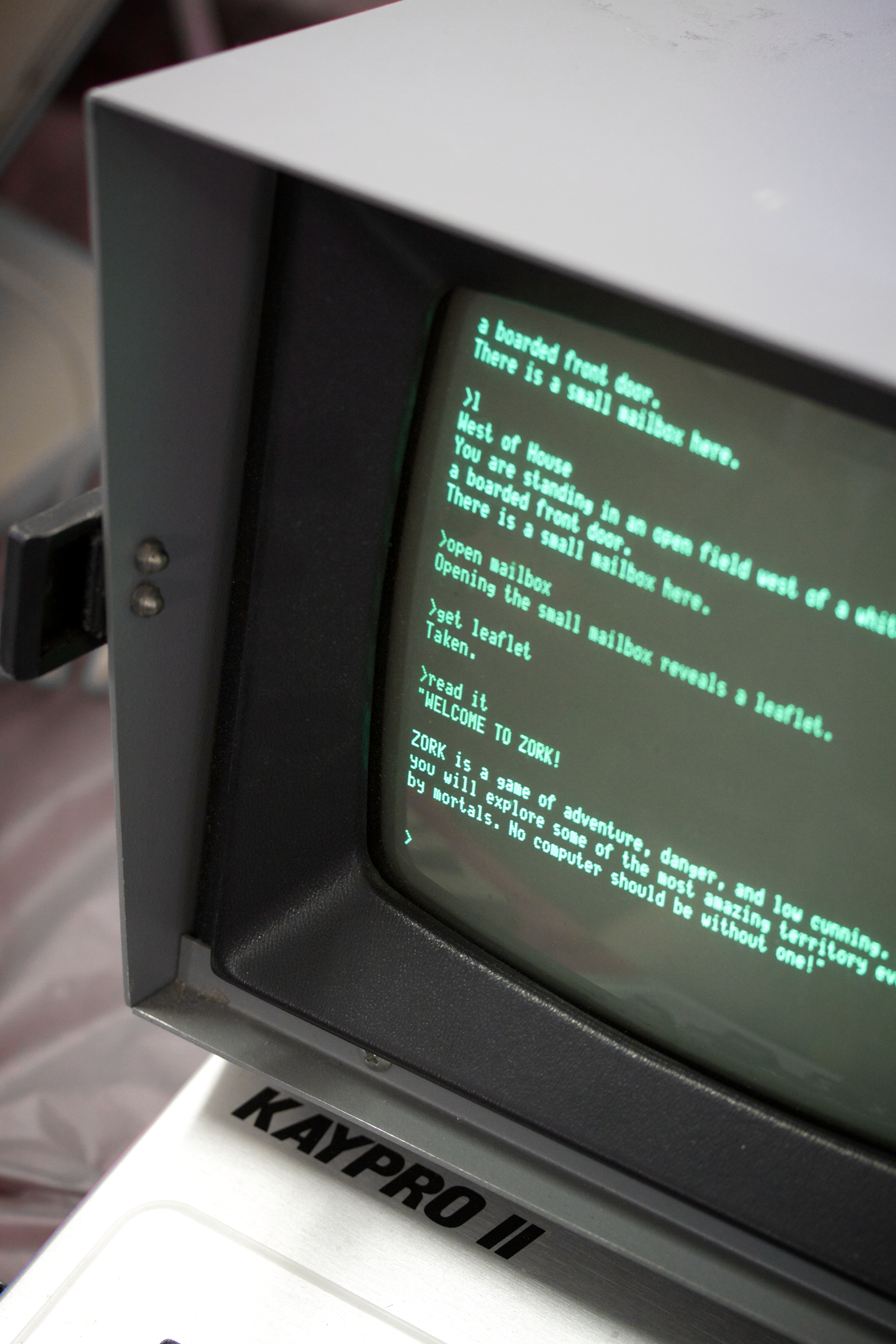
A computer terminal running Zork (1977), one of the first commercially successful text adventure games

Text adventures convey the game's story through passages of text, revealed to the player in response to typed instructions. Early text adventures, Colossal Cave Adventure or Scott Adams' games, used a simple verb-noun parser to interpret these instructions, allowing the player to interact with objects at a basic level, for example by typing "get key". Later text adventures, and modern interactive fiction, use natural language processing to enable more complex player commands like "take the key from the desk". Notable examples of advanced text adventures include most games developed by Infocom, including Zork and The Hitchhiker's Guide to the Galaxy. With the onset of graphic adventures, the text adventure fell to the wayside, though the medium remains popular as a means of writing interactive fiction (IF) particularly with the introduction of the Inform natural language platform for writing IF. Interactive fiction can still provide puzzle-based challenges like adventure games, but many modern IF works also explore alternative methods of narrative storytelling techniques unique to the interactive medium and may eschew complex puzzles associated with typical adventure games. Readers or players of IF may still need to determine how to interact appropriately with the narrative to progress and thus create a new type of challenge.

=== Graphic adventure ===
Graphic adventures are adventure games that use graphics to convey the environment to the player. Games under the graphic adventure banner may have a variety of input types, from text parsers to touch screen interfaces. Graphic adventure games will vary in how they present the avatar. Some games will utilize a first-person or third-person perspective where the camera follows the player's movements, whereas many adventure games use drawn or pre-rendered backgrounds, or a context-sensitive camera that is positioned to show off each location to the best effect.

==== Text-and-graphics adventure games ====
Text-and-graphics adventure games (also called illustrated or graphical text adventures) combine interactive fiction-style text descriptions with graphic illustrations of locations. These games sometimes use a text parser, as in the Magnetic Scrolls games; a point-and-click interface, such as the MacVenture games; or a combination of both (e.g., Tass Times in Tonetown; Enchanted Scepters and other World Builder games).

==== Point-and-click adventure games ====
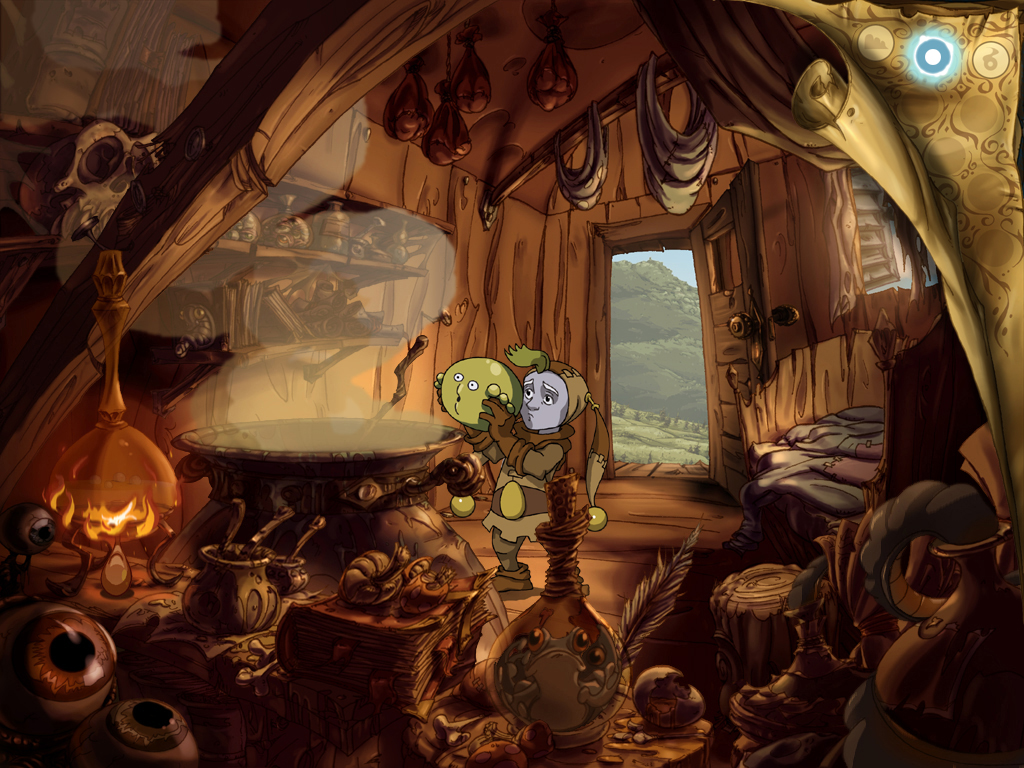
The Whispered World (2009) is an example of a context-based point-and-click adventure game using high-definition graphics and animation.

Point-and-click adventure games are those where the player typically controls their character through a point and click interface using a computer mouse or similar pointing device, though additional control schemes may also be available. The player clicks to move their character around, interact with non-player characters, often initiating conversation trees with them, examine objects in the game's settings or with their character's item inventory. Many older point-and-click games include a list of on-screen verbs to describe specific actions in the manner of a text adventure, but newer games have used more context-sensitive user interface elements to reduce or eliminate this approach. Often, these games come down to collecting items for the character's inventory, and figuring the right times to use those items; the player would need to use clues from the visual elements of the game, descriptions of the various items, and dialogue from other characters to figure this out. Later games developed by Sierra On-Line, including the King's Quest games, and nearly all of the LucasArts adventure games, are point-and-click-based games.

Point-and-click adventure games can also be the medium in which interactive, cinematic video games comprise. They feature cutscenes interspersed by short snippets of interactive gameplay that tie in with the story. This sub-genre is most famously used by the now-defunct Telltale Games with their series such as Minecraft: Story Mode and their adaptation of The Walking Dead.

==== Escape room games ====
Escape room games are a further specialization of point-and-click adventure games; these games are typically short and confined to a small space to explore, with almost no interaction with non-player characters. Most games of this type require the player to figure out how to escape a room using the limited resources within it and through the solving of logic puzzles. Other variants include games that require the player to manipulate a complex object to achieve a certain end in the fashion of a puzzle box. These games were often delivered in Adobe Flash before its discontinuation and are now most popular on mobile devices. The genre is notable for inspiring real-world escape room challenges. Examples of the subgenre include MOTAS (Mysteries of Time and Space), Crimson Room, and The Room.

==== Puzzle adventure games ====
Puzzle adventure games are adventure games that put a strong emphasis on logic puzzles. They typically emphasize self-contained puzzle challenges with logic puzzle toys or games. Completing each puzzle opens more of the game's world to explore, additional puzzles to solve, and can expand on the game's story. There are often few to no non-playable characters in such games, and lack the type of inventory puzzles that typical point-and-click adventure games have. Puzzle adventure games were popularized by Myst and The 7th Guest. These both used mixed media consisting of pre-rendered images and movie clips, but since then, puzzle adventure games have taken advantage of modern game engines to present the games in full 3D settings, such as The Talos Principle. Myst itself has been recreated in such a fashion in the title realMyst. Other puzzle adventure games are casual adventure games made up of a series of puzzles used to explore and progress the story, exemplified by The Witness, Ghost Trick: Phantom Detective, and the Professor Layton series of games.

==== Narrative adventure games ====
Narrative adventure games are those that allow for branching narratives, with choices made by the player influencing events throughout the game. While these choices do not usually alter the overall direction and major plot elements of the game's story, they help personalize the story to the player's desire through the ability to choose these determinants – exceptions include Detroit: Become Human, where players' choices can bring to multiple completely different endings and characters' death. These games favor narrative storytelling over traditional gameplay, with gameplay present to help immerse the player into the game's story: gameplay may include working through conversation trees, solving puzzles, or the use of quick time events to aid in action sequences to keep the player involved in the story. Though narrative games are similar to interactive movies and visual novels in that they present pre-scripted scenes, the advancement of computing power can render pre-scripted scenes in real-time, thus providing for more depth of gameplay that is reactive to the player. Most Telltale Games titles, such as The Walking Dead, are narrative games. Other examples include Sega AM2's Shenmue series, Konami's Shadow of Memories, Quantic Dream's Fahrenheit, Heavy Rain and Beyond: Two Souls, Dontnod Entertainment's Life Is Strange series, Supermassive Games' Until Dawn, and Night in the Woods.

==== Walking simulators ====
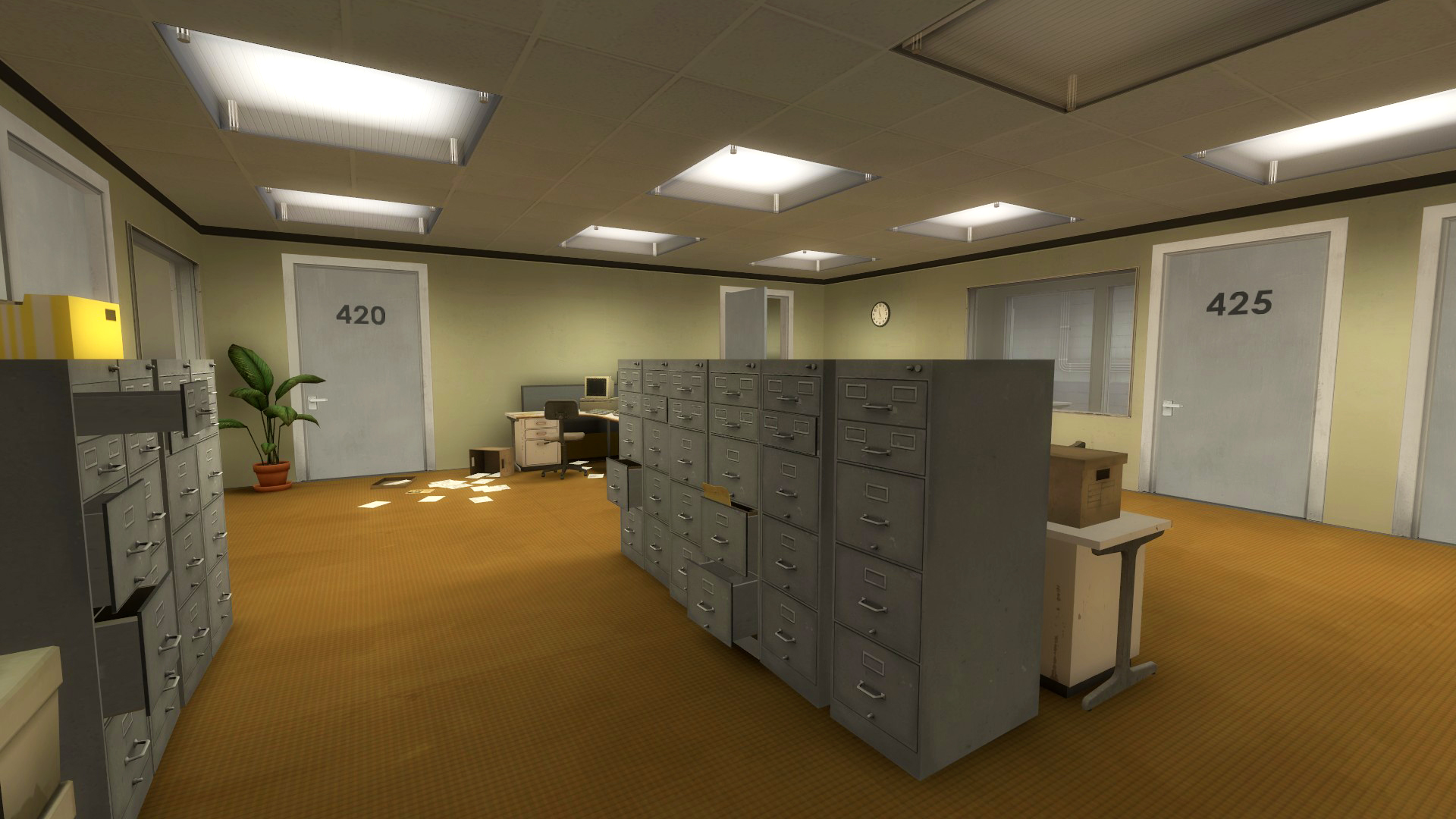
The Stanley Parable (2013) is a first-person walking simulator set in an office building.

Walking simulators, or environmental narrative games, are narrative games that generally eschew any type of gameplay outside of movement and environmental interaction that allow players to experience their story through exploration and discovery. Walking simulators feature few or even no puzzles at all, and win/lose conditions may not exist. The simulators allow players to roam around the game environment and discover objects like books, audio logs, or other clues that develop the story, and may be augmented with dialogue with non-playable characters and cutscenes. These games allow for exploration of the game's world without any time limits or other forced constraints, an option usually not offered in more action-oriented games.

The term "walking simulator" had sometimes been used pejoratively as such games feature almost no traditional gameplay elements and only involved walking around. The term has become more accepted as games within the genre gained critical praise in the 2010s; other names have been proposed, like "environmental narrative games" or "interactive narratives", which emphasizes the importance of the narration and the fact the plot is told by interaction with ambient elements. Examples of walking simulators include Gone Home, Dear Esther, Firewatch, The Vanishing of Ethan Carter, Proteus, Jazzpunk, The Stanley Parable, Thirty Flights of Loving, Everybody's Gone to the Rapture, and What Remains of Edith Finch.

=== Visual novel ===
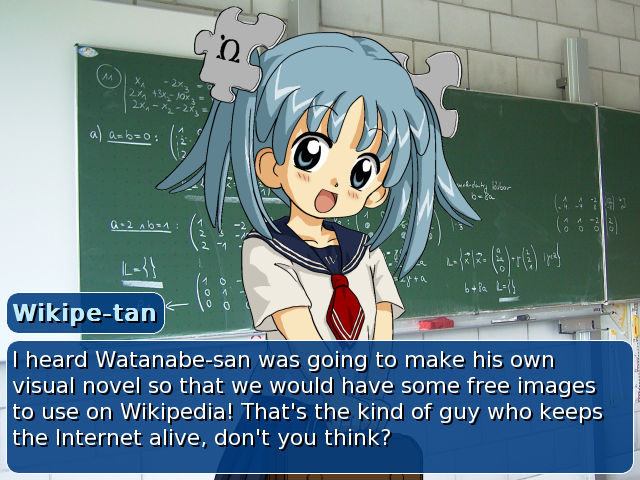
A common layout for a visual novel game

A visual novel (ビジュアルノベル, bijuaru noberu) is a hybrid of text and graphical adventure games, typically featuring text-based story and interactivity aided by static or sprite-based visuals. They resemble mixed-media novels or tableau vivant stage plays. Most visual novels typically feature dialogue trees, branching storylines, and multiple endings. The format has its primary origins in Japanese and other Asian video game markets, typically for personal computers and more recently on handheld consoles or mobile devices. The format did not gain much traction in Western markets, but started gaining more success since the late 2000s.

=== Interactive film ===
Some adventure games have been presented as interactive films; these are games where most of the graphics are either fully pre-rendered or use full motion video from live actors on a set, stored on a media that allows fast random access such as laserdisc or CD-ROM. The arcade versions of Dragon's Lair and Space Ace are canonical examples of such works. The game's software presented a scene, to which players responded by moving a joystick and pressing a button, and each choice prompted the game to play a new scene. The video may be augmented by additional computer graphics; Under a Killing Moon used a combination of full-motion video and 3D graphics. Because these games are limited by what has been pre-rendered or recorded, player interactivity is limited in these titles, and wrong choices or decisions may lead quickly to an ending scene.

=== Hybrids ===
There are a number of hybrid graphical adventure games, borrowing from two or more of the above classifications. The Zero Escape series wraps several escape-the-room puzzles within the context of a visual novel. The Adventures of Sherlock Holmes series has the player use point-and-click type interfaces to locate clues, and minigame-type mechanics to manipulate those clues to find more relevant information.

While most adventure games typically do not include any time-based interactivity by the player, some do include time-based and action game mechanics. The Telltale Games licensed episodic adventure games, and some interactive movies, such as Dragon's Lair, include quick time events. Action-adventure games are a hybrid of action games with adventure games that often require to the player to react quickly to events as they occur on screen The action-adventure genre is broad, spanning many different subgenres, but typically these games utilize strong storytelling and puzzle-solving mechanics of adventure games among the action-oriented gameplay concepts. The foremost title in this genre was Adventure, a graphic home console game developed based on the text-based Colossal Cave Adventure, while the first The Legend of Zelda brought the action-adventure concept to a broader audience.

== History of Western adventure games ==
=== Text adventures (1976–1989) ===
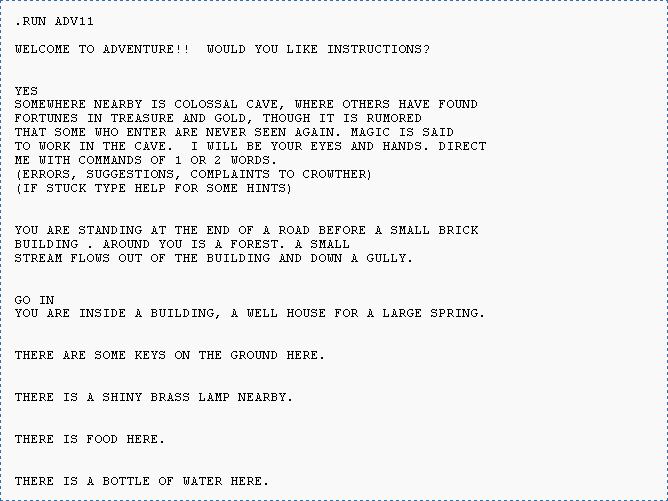
Telechrome^type output of Will Crowther's original version of Colossal Cave Adventure

The origins of text adventure games are difficult to trace as records of computing around the 1970s were not as well documented. Text-based games had existed prior to 1976 that featured elements of exploring maps or solving puzzles, such as Hunt the Wumpus (1973), but lacked a narrative element, a feature essential for adventure games. Colossal Cave Adventure (1976), written by William Crowther and Don Woods, is widely considered to be the first game in the adventure genre, and a significant influence on the genre's early development, as well as influencing core games in other genres such as Adventure (1980) for the action-adventure video game and Rogue (1980) for roguelikes. Crowther was an employee at Bolt, Beranek and Newman, a Boston company involved with ARPANET routers, in the mid-1970s. As an avid caver and role-playing game enthusiast, he wrote a text adventure based on his own knowledge of the Mammoth Cave system in Kentucky. The program, which he named Adventure, was written on the company's PDP-10 and used 300 kilobytes of memory. The program was disseminated through ARPANET, which led to Woods, working at the Stanford Artificial Intelligence Laboratory at Stanford at the time, to modify and expand the game, eventually becoming Colossal Cave Adventure.

Colossal Cave Adventure set concepts and gameplay approaches that became staples of text adventures and interactive fiction. Following its release on ARPANET, numerous variations of Colossal Cave Adventure appeared throughout the late 1970s and early 1980s, with some of these later versions being re-christened Colossal Adventure or Colossal Caves. These variations were enabled by the increase in microcomputing that allowed programmers to work on home computers rather than mainframe systems. The genre gained commercial success with titles designed for home computers. Scott Adams launched Adventure International to publish text adventures including an adaptation of Colossal Cave Adventure, while a number of MIT students formed Infocom to bring their game Zork from mainframe to home computers and was a commercial success. Infocom later released Deadline in 1982, which had a more complex text parser, and more NPCs acting independently of the player. Also innovative was its use of "feelies", which were physical documents unique to the game itself which aided the player in solving the mystery, which also resulted in the higher cost of the game at the time of its release relative to other text adventures. These feelies would soon become standard within the text adventure genre and would also be used as an early form of copy protection. Other well-known text adventure companies included Level 9 Computing, Magnetic Scrolls and Melbourne House.

When personal computers gained the ability to display graphics, the text adventure genre began to wane, and by 1990 there were few if any commercial releases, though in the UK publisher Zenobi released many games that could be purchased via mail order during the first half of the 90s. Non-commercial text adventure games have been developed for many years within the genre of interactive fiction. Games are also being developed using the older term 'text adventure' with Adventuron, alongside some published titles for older 8-bit and 16-bit machines.

=== Graphical development (1980–1990) ===
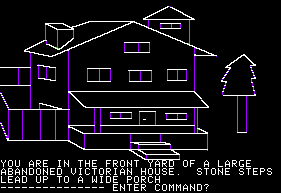
Mystery House for the Apple II was the first adventure game to use graphics in the early home computer era.

The first known graphical adventure game was Mystery House (1980), by Sierra On-Line, then at the time known as On-Line Systems. Designed by the company's co-founder Roberta Williams and programmed with the help of her husband Ken, the game featured static vector graphics atop a simple command line interface, building on the text adventure model. Roberta was directly inspired by Colossal Cave Adventure as well as the text adventure games that followed from it. Sierra continued to produce similar games under the title Hi-Res Adventure. Vector graphics gave way to bitmap graphics which also enabled simple animations to show the player-character moving in response to typed commands. Here, Sierra's King's Quest (1984), though not the first game of its type, is recognized as a commercially successful graphical adventure game, enabling Sierra to expand on more titles. Other examples of early games include Sherwood Forest (1982), The Hobbit (1982), The Return of Heracles (which faithfully portrayed Greek mythology) by Stuart Smith (1983), Dale Johnson's Masquerade (1983), Antonio Antiochia's Transylvania (1982, re-released in 1984), and Adventure Construction Set (1985), one of the early hits of Electronic Arts.

As computers gained the ability to use pointing devices and point-and-click interfaces, graphical adventure games moved away from including the text interface and simply provided appropriate commands the player could interact with on-screen. The first known game with such an interface was Enchanted Scepters (1984) from Silicon Beach Software, which combined a graphics window with interactive clickable hotspots and occasional animations, drop-down menus for the player to select actions from, and a text window with a text parser and a log describing the results of the player's actions. Planet Mephius, released in 1983, had a keyboard-driven point-and click interface (see § Early point-and-click adventures (1983–1995) below), but Enchanted Scepters was the first true point-and-click game in the sense that the cursor was controlled through the computer mouse. In 1985, ICOM Simulations released Déjà Vu, the first of its MacVenture series, which utilized a more complete point-and-click interface, including the ability to drag objects around on the current scene, and was a commercial success. LucasArts' Maniac Mansion, released in 1987, used a novel "verb-object" interface, showing all possible commands the player could use to interact with the game along with the player's inventory, which became a staple of LucasArts' own adventure games and in the genre overall.

Graphical adventure games were considered to have spurred the gaming market for personal computers from 1985 through the next decade, as they were able to offer narratives and storytelling that could not readily be told by the state of graphical hardware at the time.

=== Expansion (1990–2000) ===
Graphical adventure games continued to improve with advances in graphic systems for home computers, providing more detailed and colorful scenes and characters. With the adoption of CD-ROM in the early 1990s, it became possible to include higher quality graphics, video, and audio in adventure games.

This saw the addition of voice acting to adventure games. Similar to the first sound films, games that featured such voice-overs were called "Talkies" by all the major adventure game companies, including LucasArts, and Sierra. Use of the term continues to this day, for example by GOG.com on its page about Revolution Software's Broken Sword: The Sleeping Dragon. Mark J.P. Wolf, professor at CUW, in his Encyclopedia of Video Games:

In some genres, the rich assets afforded by the CD format could be integrated more intricately into the gameplay, for example, "talkie" revised editions of popular adventure games with digitized voices, like King's Quest V (1992) or Indiana Jones and the Fate of Atlantis (1993), in which the queries or other conversations selected by the player were fully acted out.

The 1990s also saw the rise of Interactive movies, The Beast Within: A Gabriel Knight Mystery, and the gradual adoption of three-dimensional graphics in adventure games, the critically acclaimed Grim Fandango, Lucasarts' first 3D adventure. Alone in the Dark, released in 1992, and which is now referred to as a "survival horror" game, was originally considered among other graphic adventure games by critics of the time, and significantly influenced the development of then new genre, being looked at now as a separating point. Its development was considered a break-through in technology, utilizing the first fixed-camera perspective in a 3D game, and now recognized as the first 3D survival horror game, going on to influence games such as Fatal Frame, Resident Evil, and Silent Hill, with its influence seen within other titles such as Clock Tower and Rule of Rose.

Myst used high-quality 3D rendered graphics to deliver images that were unparalleled at the time of its release.

Myst, released in 1993 by Cyan Worlds, is considered one of the genre's more influential titles. Myst included pre-rendered 3D graphics, video, and audio. Myst was an atypical game for the time, with no clear goals, little personal or object interaction, and a greater emphasis on exploration, and on scientific and mechanical puzzles. Part of the game's success was because it did not appear to be aimed at an adolescent male audience, but instead a mainstream adult audience. Myst held the record for computer game sales for seven years—it sold over six million copies on all platforms, a feat not surpassed until the release of The Sims in 2000. In addition, Myst is considered to be the "killer app" that drove mainstream adoption of CD-ROM drives, as the game was one of the first to be distributed solely on CD-ROM, forgoing the option of floppy disks. Myst's successful use of mixed-media led to its own sequels, and other puzzle-based adventure games, using mixed-media such as The 7th Guest. With many companies attempting to capitalize on the success of Myst, a glut of similar games followed its release, which contributed towards the start of the decline of the adventure game market in 2000. Nevertheless, the American market research firm NPD FunWorld reported that adventure games were the best-selling genre of the 1990s, followed by strategy video games. Writer Mark H. Walker attributed this dominance in part to Myst.

The 1990s also saw the release of many adventure games from countries that had experienced dormant or fledgling video gaming industries up until that point. These games were generally inspired by their Western counterparts and a few years behind in terms of technological and graphical advancements. In particular the fall of the Soviet Union saw countries such as Poland and Czechoslovakia release a string of popular adventure games including Tajemnica Statuetki (1993) and The Secret of Monkey Island parody Tajemství Oslího ostrova (1994), while in Russia a whole subgenre informally entitled "Russian quest" emerged following the success of Red Comrades Save the Galaxy (1998) and its sequels: those games often featured characters from Russian jokes, lowbrow humor, poor production values and "all the worst things brought by the national gaming industry". Israel had next to a non-existent video gaming industry, nevertheless Piposh (1999) became extremely popular, to the point where 20 years later a reboot named Piposh was released due to a grassroots fan movement.

=== Decline (2000–2010) ===
Whereas once adventure games were one of the most popular genres for computer games, by the mid-1990s the market share started to drastically decline. The forementioned saturation of Myst-like games on the market led to little innovation in the field and a drop in consumer confidence in the genre. Computer Gaming World reported that a "respected designer" felt it was impossible to design new and more difficult adventure puzzles as fans demanded, because Scott Adams had already created them all in his early games. Another factor that led to the decline of the adventure game market was the advent of first-person shooters, such as Doom and Half-Life. These games, taking further advantage of computer advancement, were able to offer strong, story-driven games within an action setting.

This slump in popularity led many publishers and developers to see adventure games as financially unfeasible in comparison. Notably, Sierra was sold to CUC International in 1998, and while still a separate studio, attempted to recreate an adventure game using 3D graphics, King's Quest: Mask of Eternity, as well as Gabriel Knight 3, both of which fared poorly; the studio was subsequently closed in 1999. Similarly, LucasArts released Grim Fandango in 1998 to many positive reviews but poor sales; it released one more adventure game, Escape from Monkey Island in 2000, but subsequently stopped development of Sam & Max: Freelance Police and had no further plans for adventure games. Many of those developers for LucasArts, including Grossman and Schafer, left the company during this time. Sierra developer Lori Ann Cole stated in 2003 her belief that the high cost of development hurt adventure games: "They are just too art intensive, and art is expensive to produce and to show. Some of the best of the Adventure Games were criticized they were just too short. Action-adventure or adventure role-playing games can get away with re-using a lot of the art, and stretching the game play."

Traditional adventure games became difficult to propose as new commercial titles. Gilbert wrote in 2005, "From first-hand experience, I can tell you that if you even utter the words 'adventure game' in a meeting with a publisher you can just pack up your spiffy concept art and leave. You'd get a better reaction by announcing that you have the plague." In 2012 Schafer said "If I were to go to a publisher right now and pitch an adventure game, they'd laugh in my face." Though most commercial adventure game publication had stopped in the United States by the early 2000s, the genre was still alive in Europe. Games such as The Longest Journey by Funcom as well as Amerzone and Syberia, both conceived by Benoît Sokal and developed by Microïds, with rich classical elements of the genre still garnered high critical acclaims. Even in these cases, developers often had to distance themselves from the genre in some way. The Longest Journey was instead termed a "modern adventure" for publishing and marketing. Series marketed to female gamers, however, like the Nancy Drew Mystery Adventure Series prospered with over two dozen entries put out over the decade and 2.1 million copies of games in the franchise sold by 2006, enjoying great commercial and critical success while the genre was otherwise viewed as in decline.

Similar to the fate of interactive fiction, conventional graphical adventure games have continued to thrive in the amateur scene. This has been most prolific with the tool Adventure Game Studio (AGS). Some notable AGS games include those by Ben Croshaw (namely the Chzo Mythos), Ben Jordan: Paranormal Investigator, Time Gentlemen, Please!, Soviet Unterzoegersdorf, Metal Dead, and AGD Interactive's Sierra adventure remakes. Adobe Flash is also a popular tool known for adventures such as MOTAS and the escape the room genre entries.

=== New platforms and rebirth (2005–onward) ===
Following the demise of the adventure genre in the early 2000s, a number of events have occurred that have led to a revitalization of the adventure game genre as commercially viable: the introduction of new computing and gaming hardware and software delivery formats, and the use of crowdfunding as a means of achieving funding.

The 2000s saw the growth of digital distribution and the arrival of smartphones and tablet computers, with touch-screen interfaces well-suited to point-and-click adventure games. The introduction of larger and more powerful touch screen devices like the iPad allowed for more detailed graphics, more precise controls, and a better sense of immersion and interactivity compared to personal computer or console versions. In gaming hardware, the handheld Nintendo DS and subsequent units included a touch-screen, and the Nintendo Wii console with its Wii Remote allowed players to control a cursor through motion control. These new platforms helped decrease the cost of bringing an adventure game to market, providing an avenue to re-release older, less graphically advanced games like The Secret of Monkey Island, King's Quest and Space Quest and attracting a new audience to adventure games.

Further, the improvements in digital distribution led to the concept of episodic adventure games, delivering between three and five "chapters" of a full game over a course of several months via online storefronts, Steam, Xbox Live Marketplace, PlayStation Store, and Nintendo eShop. Modeled off the idea of televisions episodes, episodic adventure games break the story into several parts, giving players a chance to digest and discuss the current story with others before the next episode is available, and further can enhance the narrative by creating cliffhangers or other dramatic elements to be resolved in later episodes. The first major successful episodic adventure games were those of Telltale Games, a developer founded by former LucasArts employees following the cancellation of Sam & Max: Freelance Police. Telltale found critical success in The Walking Dead series released in 2012, which won numerous game of the year awards, and eschewed traditional adventure game elements and puzzles for a strong story and character-driven game, forcing the player to make on-the-spot decisions that became determinants and affected not only elements in the current episode but future episodes and sequels. The game also eschewed the typical dialog tree with a more natural language progression, which created a more believable experience. Its success was considered a revitalization of the genre, and led Telltale to produce more licensed games driven by story rather than puzzles. However, Telltale Games suffered from mismanagement and excessive rapid growth from trying to release too many games at the same time, and in mid-2018, had undergone a majority studio closure, laying off most of its staff and selling off most of its assets. By the end of 2018, LCG Entertainment had acquired many of the former Telltale assets and relaunched a new Telltale Games to continue its adventure game history. Other former Telltale Games works such as The Walking Dead fell back to their original IP holders, such as Skybound Entertainment in the case of The Walking Dead, who took over for publishing the games.

Meanwhile, another avenue for adventure game rebirth came from the discovery of the influence of crowdfunding. Tim Schafer had founded Double Fine Productions after leaving LucasArts in 2000. He had tried to find funding support for an adventure game, but publishers refused to consider his proposals for fear of the genre being unpopular. In 2012, Schafer turned to Kickstarter to raise $400,000 to develop an adventure game; the month-long campaign ended with over $3.4 million raised, making it, at the time, one of the largest Kickstarter projects, enabling Double Fine to expand the scope of their project and completing the game as Broken Age, released over two parts in 2014 and 2015. The success led many other developers to consider the crowd funding approach, including those in the adventure game genre who saw the Double Fine Kickstarter as a sign that players wanted adventure games. Many sequels, remakes, and spiritual successors to classic adventure games emerged on Kickstarter, leading to a significant increase in traditional adventure game development during this time. Some of these include:

- Armikrog
- Broken Sword: The Serpent's Curse
- Dreamfall Chapters
- Gabriel Knight
- Leisure Suit Larry: Reloaded
- Moebius: Empire Rising
- Obduction
- Sam and Max Save the World
- SpaceVenture
- Tesla Effect: A Tex Murphy Adventure
- Thimbleweed Park

However, far fewer adventure games are released in Western countries annually than other genres.

== History of Japanese adventure games ==
Due to differences in computer hardware, language, and culture, development of adventure games went in a different direction in Japan compared to Western markets. The most popular adventure game subgenres in Japan are visual novels and dating sims.

=== Early computer graphic adventures (1981–1988) ===
In the early 1980s, computer adventure games began gaining popularity in Japan. While the NEC and PC-8801 were prominent, the country's computer market was largely dominated by PC-9801 (1982), which had a resolution of 640×400, higher than Western computers at the time, in order to accommodate Japanese text. While the computer became known for its higher resolutions, the lack of hardware sprites and anemic video RAM resulted in games having a tendency to be much slower. This in turn influenced game design, as Japanese computers became known for RPG's and Adventure games with detailed color graphics, which eventually evolved into visual novels and dating sims.

The most famous early Japanese computer adventure game was the murder mystery game The Portopia Serial Murder Case (1983), developed by Yuji Horii and published by Enix. The player interacts with the game using a verb-noun parser which requires typing precise commands with the keyboard. The game featured exploring an open world, an interrogative dialogue menu system, and making choices that determined the order of events. The game was well received in Japan, with praise aimed at its mystery, drama, and humor. The game was later re-released on the Famicom in 1985 and featured the addition of 3D dungeon mazes and a verb menu system.

Japan's first domestic computer adventure games to be released were ASCII's Omotesando Adventure (表参道アドベンチャー) and Minami Aoyama Adventure (南青山アドベンチャー), released for the PC-9801 in 1982.

Due to a lack of content restrictions, some of Japan's earliest adventure games were also bishoujo games with eroge content. In 1982, the eroge, Danchi Tsuma no Yuwaku (Seduction of the Condominium Wife), was released, becoming a big enough success to turn Koei into a major software company. Other now-famous companies such as Enix, Square and Nihon Falcom also produced similar eroge in the early 1980s before they became famous for their mainstream role-playing games.

A notable 1987 adventure game was Arsys Software's Reviver: The Real-Time Adventure, which included a real-time persistent world where time continues to elapse, day-night cycles adjust the brightness of the screen to indicate the time of day, and certain stores and non-player characters would only be available at certain times of the day.

Hideo Kojima was inspired by The Portopia Serial Murder Case to enter the video game industry, and produce his own adventure games. His first graphic adventure was released by Konami: Snatcher (1988), an ambitious cyberpunk detective novel graphic adventure that was highly regarded at the time for its cinematic cut scenes and mature content.

=== Interactive movie arcade games (1983–1985) ===
Interactive movie games are considered a subgenre of adventure games. This subgenre has origins in interactive movie arcade games.

The first interactive movie laserdisc video game was Sega's Astron Belt, unveiled in 1982 and released in 1983, though it was more of a shooter game presented as an action movie using full motion video. A more story-driven interactive movie game was Bega's Battle, released in 1983, which combined shooting stages with interactive anime cutscenes, where player input had an effect on the game's branching storyline. Time Gal (1985), in addition to featuring quick time events, added a time-stopping feature where specific moments in the game involve Reika stopping time; during these moments, players are presented with a list of three options and have seven seconds to choose one.

=== Early point-and-click adventures (1983–1995) ===
A notable adventure game released in 1983 was Planet Mephius, authored by Eiji Yokoyama and published by T&E Soft for the FM-7 in July 1983. In addition to being one of the earliest titles to use a command menu system, its key innovation was the introduction of a point-and-click interface to the genre, utilizing a cursor to interact with objects displayed on the screen, albeit the cursor utilizing primitive keyboard controls instead of a mouse. A similar point-and-click cursor interface was later used in the adventure game Wingman, released for the PC-8801 in 1984.

The Famicom version of The Portopia Serial Murder Case was released in 1985 and sold over 700,000 copies. With no keyboard, the Famicom version, developed by Chunsoft, replaced the text parser of the original with a command selection menu list. It also featured a cursor that can be moved on the screen using the D-pad to look for clues and hotspots, like a point-and-click interface.

In 1986, Square released the science fiction adventure game Suishō no Dragon for the Family Computer Disk System. The game featured the use of animation in many of the scenes rather than still images or sprites, which was unusual at the time for a console game, and an interface resembling that of a point-and-click interface for a console, like The Portopia Serial Murder Case on the Famicom, but making use of visual icons rather than text-based ones. That same year saw the release of J.B. Harold Murder Club, a graphic adventure, for the PC-98. It featured character interaction as the major gameplay element and has been compared to more recent titles such as Shenmue and Shadow of Memories as well as the role-playing game Star Wars: Knights of the Old Republic. The TurboGrafx-CD port of J.B. Harold Murder Club was one of the first Japanese adventure games released in the United States.

Haruhiko Shono's adventure games Alice: An Interactive Museum (1991), L-Zone (1992) and Gadget: Invention, Travel, & Adventure (1993) used pre-rendered 3D computer graphics, predating Myst, though lacking in the same level of interactivity, often referred to more as "Interactive Movies" rather than games. The plot of Gadget influenced filmmaker Guillermo del Toro.

In 1995, Human Entertainment's Clock Tower for the Super Famicom was a hybrid between a point-and-click graphic adventure and a survival horror game, revolving around survival against a deadly stalker known as Scissorman that chased players throughout the game. Alongside the French Alone in the Dark, it played a key role in the formation of the survival horror genre.

=== Visual novels (1990–present) ===
A distinct form of Japanese adventure game that eventually emerged is the visual novel, a genre that was largely rooted in The Portopia Serial Murder Case, but gradually became more streamlined and uses many conventions that are distinct from Western adventures. They are almost universally first-person, and driven primarily by dialog. They also tend to use menu-based interactions and navigation, with point and click implementations that are quite different from Western adventure games. Inventory-based puzzles of the sort that form the basis of classic Western adventures, are quite rare. Logic puzzles like those found in Myst are likewise unusual. Because of this, Japanese visual novels tend to be streamlined, and often quite easy, relying more on storytelling than challenge to keep players interested.

Kojima's next graphic adventure production was Policenauts (1994), him returning to the genre following Metal Gear 2: Solid Snake's completion. Policenauts is a point-and-click adventure notable for being an early example of extensive voice recording in video games. The gameplay was largely similar to Snatcher, but with the addition of a point-and-click interface. Policenauts also introduced summary screens, which act to refresh the player's memory of the plot upon reloading a save, an element Kojima later used in Metal Gear Solid.

From the early 1990s, Chunsoft, the developer for the Famicom version of The Portopia Serial Murder Case, began producing a series of acclaimed visual novels known as the Sound Novel series, which went on to sell a combined total of more than two million copies.

The visual novel Yu-no: A Girl Who Chants Love at the Bound of This World, directed by Hiroyuki Kanno and released by ELF in 1996, raised standards in Japan with its elaborate storyline and music; heightened player expectations led to creative revitalisation in the genre. Its concepts influenced other visual novels, with their storytelling being affected by its mechanism of parallel story branches.

=== 3D adventure games (1993–present) ===
From the 1990s, a number of Japanese adventure games began using a 3D third-person direct control format, particularly on consoles like the PlayStation, Dreamcast and PlayStation 2. Examples include The Life Stage: Virtual House (1993), Human Entertainment's Mizzurna Falls (1998), Sega's Shenmue series (1999–2002), and Konami's Shadow of Memories (2001).

The success of Resident Evil in 1996 was followed by the release of the survival horror graphic adventures Clock Tower (Clock Tower 2) and Clock Tower II: The Struggle Within for the PlayStation. The Clock Tower games proved to be hits, capitalizing on the success of Resident Evil, though both games stayed true to the graphic-adventure gameplay of the original Clock Tower rather than following the lead of Resident Evil.

Sega's ambitious Shenmue (1999) attempted to redefine the adventure game genre with its realistic 3D graphics, third-person perspective, direct character control interface, sandbox open-world gameplay, quick time events, and fighting game elements. Its creator Yu Suzuki originally touted it as a new kind of adventure game, "FREE" ("Full Reactive Eyes Entertainment"), giving them full reign to explore expansive interactive city environments with its own day-night cycles and changing weather, and interact with fully voiced non-player characters going about their daily routines. Despite being a commercial failure, the game was critically acclaimed and has remained influential.

=== Global expansion (2000–present) ===
In recent years, Japanese visual novel games have been released in the West more frequently, particularly on the Nintendo DS handheld following the success of mystery-solving titles such as Capcom's Ace Attorney series (which began on the Game Boy Advance in 2001), Cing's Hotel Dusk series (beginning in 2006), and Level-5's Professor Layton series (beginning in 2007). Online distribution has also helped lower the costs of bringing niche Japanese titles to the global market, which has enabled another outlet for visual novels and dating sims to be localized and released for Western regions. Localization and distribution can be performed by small teams, lowering financial barriers to updating these games.

The Nintendo DS in particular helped spark a resurgence in the genre's popularity through the introduction of otherwise unknown Japanese adventure games, typically visual novels localized for Western audiences. In 2005, Capcom re-released the courtroom-based visual novel game Phoenix Wright: Ace Attorney, originally a 2001 Game Boy Advance game released only in Japan, for the Nintendo DS in both Asian and Western markets. The game and its sequels proved popular with Western audiences. Following on Ace Attorney's success, Level-5 and Nintendo published the Professor Layton series worldwide starting in 2007. Both have since become some of the best-selling adventure game franchises, with Ace Attorney selling more than 13 million units worldwide and Professor Layton selling over 18 million units worldwide.

== Emulation and virtual machines ==
Most text adventure games are readily accessible on modern computers due to the use of a small number of standard virtual machines (such as the Z engine) used to drive these games at their original release which have been recreated in more portable versions. A popular text adventure interpreter is Frotz, which can play all the old Infocom text adventures. Some modern text adventure games can even be played on very old computer systems. Text adventure games are also suitable for personal digital assistants, because they have very small computer system requirements. Other text adventure games are fully playable via web browsers.

On the other hand, many graphical adventure games cannot run on modern operating systems. Early adventure games were developed for home computers that are not in use today. Emulators and virtual machines are available for modern computers that allow these old games to be played on the latest operating systems, though players must have access to the game's assets themselves to legally play them. One open-source software project called ScummVM provides a free engine for the LucasArts adventure games, the SCUMM-derived engine for Humongous Entertainment adventure games, early Sierra titles, Revolution Software 2D adventures, Coktel Vision adventure games and a few more assorted 2D adventures. ResidualVM is a sister project to ScummVM, aimed to emulate 3D-based adventure games such as Grim Fandango and Myst III: Exile. Another called VDMSound can emulate the old sound-cards which many of the games require.

DOSBox is designed to emulate an IBM PC compatible computer running MS-DOS. Many companies, like Sierra Entertainment, have included DOSBox in their rereleases of older games.

== See also ==
- Cybertext
- Get Lamp, a documentary on interactive fiction
- List of graphic adventure games
- List of text-based computer games
- MUD
- Roguelike
