= Crimson Room =

2004 video game

- Developer: Toshimitsu Takagi
- Publisher: TAKAGISM Inc.
- Platform: web browser
- Release: Crimson Room, Viridian Room, Blue Chamber: 2004; White Chamber: 2005; Crimson Room (DS): 2007; Crimson Room Reverse: Japan: 2008; USA: 2009; Crimson Room '11: 2011; Crimson Room Decade: 2016
- Genres: Escape the room, Puzzle
- Mode: Single-player

Crimson Room is a 2004 online point-and-click adventure game created by Japanese developer Toshimitsu Takagi. Developed with Adobe Flash and released for free on the internet, it broke out in popularity and is often credited with popularising the escape room video game genre (also known as the 'escape the room' genre), even inspiring the term 'Takagism' used in Asia to refer to the genre.

The game begins with text explaining to the player that they have mysteriously awoken in a room and must escape. They may then explore the room, which is portrayed graphically with a series of fixed camera angles in a three-dimensional space, and can click certain spots in the room to investigate objects or uncover new angles, gathering items they find and using them to attempt to escape the room and complete the game.

Takagi developed three follow-up games following the same format: Viridian Room and Blue Chamber, released later in 2004, and White Chamber, released in December 2005. All four games were made available to play online for free, and later included in two collections for handheld consoles: Crimson Room for the Nintendo DS and the expanded remake Crimson Room Reverse for the PlayStation Portable. A port of the original Crimson Room for feature phones became available in 2006, and an adaptation of the game for Android and iPhone devices titled Crimson Room '11 was released in 2011. A full sequel, Crimson Room Decade, was released in 2016 for Windows and Mac OS X.

== Gameplay ==
Crimson Room begins with a brief monologue in which the player clicks to advance the text displayed on-screen. The player character narrates their experience waking up, saying they had drunk too much last night and realising the bed they were sleeping in is not theirs and the room they awoke in is one unfamiliar to them. They question if they are in a hotel room, then deny it and conclude that they are trapped in the room and must escape. This plot is cursory and is not relevant to the remainder of the game beyond providing a scenario to introduce the player to the room.

The room is then shown to the player, with a crimson red ceiling and crimson walls, and the player may click on the screen to get out of the bed, allowing them to begin interacting with the room. The room is presented from a first-person perspective as a three-dimensional space, where it can be explored and interacted with in the style of a typical point-and-click adventure game. The player initially sees a door with a doorknob, and a desk, which has drawers and has a bowl and a stereo on top of it. They may investigate or attempt to interact with the objects they see in the room by clicking on them. Clicking on the door will tell the player that "It is a strong door", and clicking on the doorknob will reveal that "The knob does not turn". They may look at the room from different fixed camera angles by clicking on the edges of the screen to move their field of view towards that area of the screen. They may also see a closer perspective of specific objects by clicking on them, or reveal new, hidden angles of the room by clicking on certain areas of it. For example, the player must click a particular space near the edge of a mattress to then see the area between the bed and the wall.

Some objects found in the room are items which are collected when clicked and are added to the inventory of the player. The pillow on the bed in the room lifts up when clicked, revealing a golden key underneath, which the player can collect. The player can then select the key they collected from the inventory section of the interface, and click on a previously-locked drawer in the room to use the key on the drawer and unlock it, allowing them to open it and find a power cord inside, another item the player can collect. The power cord can be used on the stereo on top of the desk to power it, letting the player click on the stereo's power button to turn it on. Eventually, after solving every puzzle in the room, the player is able to collect a screwdriver and use it on the doorknob of the locked door, which lets them escape, completing the game.

Viridian Room, Blue Chamber, and White Chamber all follow the same basic format as Crimson Room, but feature new rooms and puzzles to be solved. The Nintendo DS version of Crimson Room lets players choose to play any of the aforementioned four games, and allows players to save their progress in the rooms so they can leave the game and resume it later. Players navigate the room by using the touchscreen to tap on specific areas of the room to search them or interact with objects, just as the mouse is used in the online version. The game's puzzles were changed only as necessary to allow the game to be played on the handheld console and without using the internet — a notepad in the original release of Crimson Room which showed a web address for players to visit was replaced with an in-game PDA in the Nintendo DS version. The PlayStation Portable release Crimson Room Reverse uses the console's analog stick in place of a physical mouse, and features eight games total: the original four games in the series, and modified 'Reverse' versions of each game.

== Reception ==
At the time of its release, Crimson Room was praised and considered an innovative work. Peter Cohen, writing for Macworld in 2005, called the game a "remarkable piece of work" that tested the limits of the Adobe Flash platform. Matt Frilingos of The Daily Telegraph emphasised its quality, and said that the time of players would be filled well trying to solve its puzzles.

A 2010 article for The Kathmandu Post considered the game "exemplary" and intellectually challenging, judging it in value alongside other online games such as Quake Live and FarmVille. Some later commentary, however, has focused on the game's short length and unintuitive puzzle-solving. An article written for Siliconera in 2007 deemed Crimson Room a "glorified pixel hunt" and said it would likely take players only an hour or less to beat even without using a walkthrough. It also noted the game's "bad English". Steven T. Wright, writing in 2019, noted that the game may fail to "hold up to modern tastes", featuring "tedious pixel-sniping" and some questionable logic, but argued that its appeal lies not in its gameplay but in its atmosphere and sense of mystique. Another Siliconera article, evaluating the Nintendo DS collection of Crimson Room and its three successors, argues that while the games are interesting, they lack replay value and have too little content to merit purchasing a paid copy for the console when the games are available for free online.

== Legacy ==
The original Crimson Room is often cited as originating the 'escape the room' genre, although MOTAS, which was influential in its own right, predates it by a few years. (Crimson Room's credits list MOTAS, Droom, and Chasm, all prior Flash games, as inspiration.) Regardless, the game is a seminal work which popularised the genre, especially in Japan, received 800 million views online, and inspired hundreds of other games like it. As well as its sequels and ports, it received a novelisation written by Takagi which was published in 2008.

Crimson Room has often been noted as influential on real-world escape rooms and an inspiration for their creation. The game in particular, as well as the trend of online 'escape the room' games in Japan that it sparked, has been said to have incited the creation of the first real escape room event hosted by Japanese magazine SCRAP. The event was a pioneer in real-world escape rooms and is generally considered to have been the first example of a physical escape room in the world.

The magazine's founder, Takao Kato, took interest in a conversation with a friend about escape the room Flash games, which inspired him to publish an article about them and plan and host a real game to tie-in with the article, as SCRAP normally hosted events that thematically related to its articles. He later wrote that playing Crimson Room specifically was itself what first led him to create his original Real Escape Game, saying it inspired him through being perfectly "logical, simple, and stimulating". Kato's concept was successful and led to the expansion of Real Escape Game into a major brand of escape room events.

The term 'Takagism', which came from the name of Crimson Room's developer Toshimitsu Takagi and was the brand he used for his works, then became used in Japan to refer to escape room video games as a whole, is now used in China to refer to real-world escape rooms, as they were known to have been inspired by or 'adapted from' Takagism games. For example, one of the first groups hosting escape rooms in China, founded in 2012, was known in English as the Beijing Takagism Club.
