= Shadow of Memories =

2001 video game

Shadow of Memories Shadow of Destiny
- Developers: Konami Computer Entertainment Tokyo; Runecraft (PC port)
- Publisher: Konami
- Director: Junko Kawano
- Producer: Junko Kawano
- Artists: Minako Asano; Junko Kawano; Yohei Kiyohara; Kazuhide Nakazawa
- Writer: Junko Kawano
- Composers: Norikazu Miura; Hana Hashikawa; Sayaka Yamaoka
- Platforms: PlayStation 2, Xbox, Microsoft Windows, PlayStation Portable
- Release: PlayStation 2: JP: February 22, 2001; NA: March 8, 2001; EU: March 30, 2001; Windows: NA: June 2002; EU: February 7, 2003; Xbox: EU: September 27, 2002; PlayStation Portable: JP: October 1, 2009; NA: January 26, 2010
- Genre: Adventure
- Mode: Single-player

Shadow of Memories (シャドウ・オブ・メモリーズ, Shadou obu Memorīzu) (Shadow of Destiny in North America) is a mystery adventure game developed by Konami Computer Entertainment Tokyo and published by Konami. Originally released for the PlayStation 2 in 2001, it was later ported to Xbox (which is only released in Europe) and Microsoft Windows in 2002. A PlayStation Portable version was released on October 1, 2009 in Japan and on January 26, 2010 in North America.

== Gameplay ==
The color tone varies depending on which era Eike time-travels to. For example, the early twentieth century is depicted in grey tones while 1580 appears in earth-colored ones.

The objective of Shadow of Memories is to guide player character Eike Kusch through the fictional German town of Lebensbaum (Life's Tree) as he travels through time to prevent and unmask his murderer. The game takes place in three parts: a prologue, eight chapters, and an epilogue. In the prologue and each chapter, Eike dies, is resurrected by the non-player character Homunculus, and travels back in time before his death with the intent of changing events to prevent it. Shadow of Memories lacks traditional action elements, and Eike cannot attack nor does he have a bar displaying his health. The digipad, a time-traveling item given to Eike by Homunculus, requires energy units, which the player can find scattered around the town. The gameplay primarily consists of time-traveling through the different eras, finding items, and interacting through dialogue with the non-player characters. Actions taken in one time period affect future ones; for example, if Eike removes a seal from the squire's manor in 1580, the seal will not appear in the present era.

Additionally, the game keeps two digital clocks: one depicting the time in the present-day era and another for whichever era Eike time-travels to. The amount of time Eike spends in the different eras also passes in the present-day one. The cut-scenes and dialogue takes up varying amounts of in-game time. When the clock arrives at the time of Eike's death, the chapter restarts, however, if Eike is not in his time period at the time of his death, the game ends.

== Plot ==
Set in a fictional German town named Lebensbaum (The Tree of Life), Shadow of Memories revolves around a 22-year-old man named Eike Kusch, who dies in the beginning of the game from being stabbed after leaving a small diner. However, he is resurrected by Homunculus, a djinn or genie, who offers to send him back in time to prevent his death and gives him the time-traveling digipad. Eike explores four eras—2001, 1979/1980, 1902 and 1580 to 1584 — as he attempts to unmask his killer and figure out a way of stopping his own murder at various points in the present. Along the way he encounters several characters: Dana, a modern-day waitress whom he accidentally brings back to the year 1580 and loses; the present-day fortune teller, who tells Eike the hour of his death; Eckart Brum, the curator of a private art museum who lost his wife and infant daughter in a shooting; Dr. Wolfgang Wagner, an alchemist living in 1580 with his wife, Helena, and their two children, Hugo and Margarete; and Alfred Brum, the great-grandfather of Eckart.

Given a red stone by Dana, Eike follows the Homunculus' instructions to give the stone to Wagner. Time-traveling ten days later, Eike discovers that the result of Wagner's experiment destroyed the lab and caused Hugo, already upset by his mother's death due to a lingering illness, to build a time machine and track Eike down with the intent of killing him. Depending on the player's actions, Hugo holds either Margarete or Dana hostage in the present and plans to use the red stone, revealed to be the Philosopher's Stone, to resurrect his mother.

=== Endings ===
Shadow of Memories contains eight endings to the plot, with six available at first, the last two being unlocked by achieving the first six. In the first six endings, Eike discovers that Homunculus was using him to ensure that he would be "created" (actually unsealed) by Wagner and returns the digipad to him, with the fifth timeline/ending revealing that Wagner is actually a rejuvenated Eike who was cursed with both immortality and amnesia by the very Homunculus in retaliation for being resealed back into the stone. The last two endings (EX Endings) have Eike retaining all of his memories from the previous timelines, obtained the Philosopher's Stone from the diner much earlier and either gives Dr. Wagner the stone to successfully cure Helena or throwing it at the Homunculus, erasing him from existence upon contact. Both resulted in Eike disappearing, with the final scene showing a possible descendant or reincarnation of Eike in present-day walking through the streets like in the beginning of the game, with the difference that rather than being stabbed, he was hit by a soccer ball unharmed, and returns the ball to a boy who may either be Hugo's descendant or reincarnation.

== Development ==
Developed by Konami Computer Entertainment Tokyo, a playable demo of Shadow of Memories debuted at the Tokyo Game Show in September 2000. The game went through several development titles: The Day and Night of Walpurgisnacht, Days of Walpurgis, and Time Adventure. Konami released Shadow of Memories for the PlayStation 2 in Japan on February 22, 2001, in North America on March 8, 2001 (retitled as "Shadow of Destiny"), and in Europe on March 30, 2001. In 2002, the now-defunct Runecraft company ported it to the PC, while an Xbox port appeared simultaneously in Europe and Australasia; a PlayStation Portable port arrived in 2009.

== Reception and legacy ==
Reception

Aggregate score
Aggregator	Score		
Aggregator	PC	PS2	PSP
Metacritic	71/100	78/100	54/100

Review scores
Publication	Score		
Publication	PC	PS2	PSP
Computer Games Magazine	2.5/5	N/A	N/A
Computer Gaming World	2/5	N/A	N/A
Electronic Gaming Monthly	N/A	6.5/10, 7.5/10, 6.5/10	N/A
Famitsu	N/A	7/10, 8/10, 8/10, 7/10	N/A
Game Informer	N/A	6.75/10	N/A
GameRevolution	N/A	B	N/A
GameSpot	7.7/10	8.2/10	N/A
GameSpy	78%	80%	N/A
IGN	8.7/10	8.5/10	7.1/10
Next Generation	N/A	4/5	N/A
Official U.S. PlayStation Magazine	N/A	3.5/5	N/A
PC Gamer (US)	70%	N/A	N/A
PlayStation: The Official Magazine	N/A	8/10	5/10
RPGFan	N/A	66%	N/A

The PlayStation 2 version received "favorable" reviews, while the PC and PSP versions received "mixed or average reviews" according to video game review aggregator Metacritic. Kevin Rice of NextGen said of the former console version, "Good adventure games on consoles are rare, and even if you normally don't like adventure games, this one is worth checking out. It lures players in like few others in recent memory." In Japan, Famitsu gave the PS2 version a score of 30 out of 40.

Reviewers praised the overall plot as the game's strength, especially on PlayStation 2. IGN's David Zdyrko called the story "one of the deepest and most engaging that has ever been told through a videogame." Andrew Vestal of GameSpot enjoyed the idea of the detective in a murder mystery as the intended victim. Writing for GameRevolution, Shawn Sanders liked the time-traveling aspect of the game. Johnny Minkley of Computer and Video Games magazine called it "a brilliantly conceived, wonderfully executed game."

The graphics of the PS2 version received mixed responses. Sanders found the textures of the game "clean and detailed". Zdyrko disliked the low amount of detail on the characters and some of the background, but enjoyed the "lighting and particle effects", particularly the snow and night. Vestal praised the different visual depictions of Lebensbaum, and felt that high level of detail in the backgrounds helped to somewhat counterbalance the low-resolution of the game's graphics. Critics agreed that the full motion videos were well-done, and praised the realistic character animation.

Critics commented on the general absence of action in the gameplay. Sanders considered it the game's greatest flaw and a possible source of frustration for players. The slow beginning to the PS2 version was remarked on by critics, who felt that the game eventually picked up after a while. Additionally, the "stiff" motion of the protagonist when running drew criticism. Reviewers noted the relatively short play time, and felt that the multiple endings enhanced the game's replay value.

The game's soundtrack was well received. Critics wrote that it suited the mood and occasionally helped to build suspense. The voice acting also went over well, with several critics remarking on the quality of it. Zdyrko described it as "first-class" and believable, and commented that since much of the PS2 version consists of dialogue, flawed voice acting might have ruined the game. Vestal considered the voice acting of B-movie quality, but not flawed enough to be a major distraction.

Kevin Krause of GameZone gave the PlayStation 2 version eight out of ten, calling it "a relatively short play, as it can easily be finished in one day." Jake The Snake of GamePro called it "a worthwhile game, but just as you wouldn't spend $50 for a DVD you've never seen, rent this first." (Note: GamePro gave the PlayStation 2 version 4.5/5 for graphics, and three 4/5 scores for sound, control, and fun factor.) Jon Thompson of AllGame gave it three-and-a-half stars out of five, calling it "an outstanding adventure game in terms of thematic and narrative structure. Fans of the adventure genre and those are interested in something new should give this one a look. Those who would rather demolish enemies instead of sitting through countless conversations, however, should forget about solving Eike Kusch's murder." However, Jason D'Aprile of Extended Play gave it two stars out of five, saying, "The main, and probably only, draws to this adventure are some great story concepts and its minor replay value. 'Shadow of Destiny' is a cool idea, but the lack of meaty gameplay, awful dialog, and a short game time make this a minor footnote in the history of the PlayStation2's library. Let's hope the next adventure for the system fares better." Edge also gave the Japanese import four out of ten, saying, "If the same amount of care had been placed in the game dynamic, Shadow Of Memories might have been less of a disappointment."

Mark H. Walker of The Electric Playground gave the PlayStation 2 version eight out of ten, calling it "quality adventure gaming at its best." However, Bonnie later gave it 6.5 out of 10, saying, "The game is a little bit tough to get into. The controls (mouse look and arrows keys to move) are a tad ungainly." Christina Gmiterko of Adventure Gamers gave the PC version three-and-a-half stars out of five, saying, "I wouldn't say that the gameplay is the high point here. Controlling Eike will be tedious for some and if you weren't a fan of the 3D control in games like Grim Fandango or Gabriel Knight 3, you should steer clear of this one."

The PC version was nominated for the "Best Adventure Game for PC" award at The Electric Playground's 2002 Blister Awards, which went to both Syberia and Silent Hill 2. It was also nominated for the "Best Adventure Game for PC" Award at GameSpot's Best and Worst of 2002 Awards, which also went to Syberia. The staff of the latter website called it "one of the best PC adventure games to come around in some time". In 2011, Adventure Gamers named it the 68th-best adventure game ever released.

=== Time Hollow ===
After Shadow of Memories, Kawano wrote and directed another game with a time-traveling element: the 2008 Nintendo DS title Time Hollow; it focuses on seventeen-year-old Ethan Kairos, who awakens in a world where his parents have been missing for twelve years, and his quest to find them. Along the way, he obtains the Hollow Pen, which allows him to create time portals to solve the mystery. Time Hollow continues the "themes of time manipulation and paradoxes", for which Kawano has expressed an interest.
