= Justin Richards =

British writer (1961–2026)

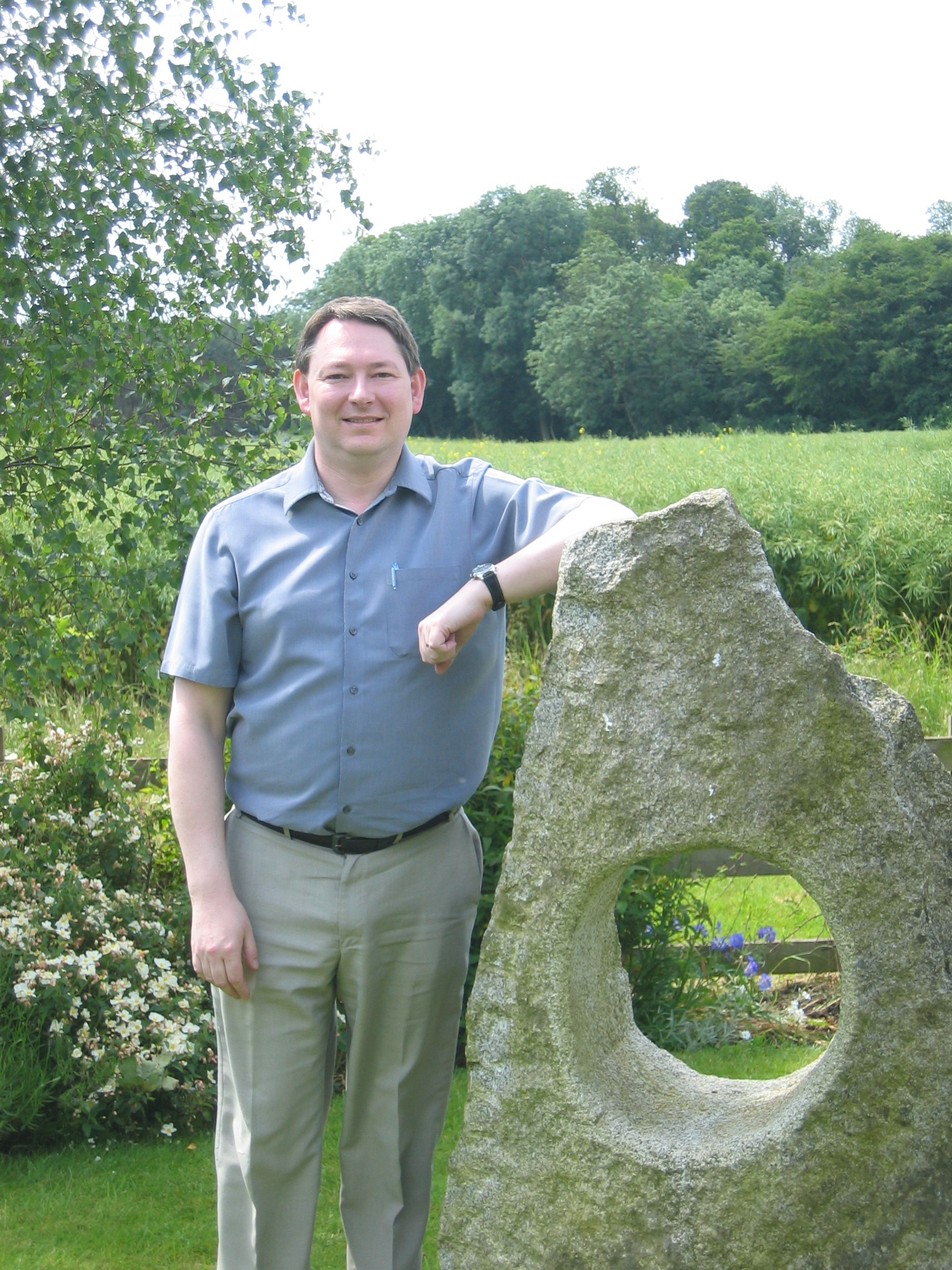
- Richards in the garden of his house in Warwickshire
- Born: 14 September 1961; Epping, Essex, England
- Died: 28 June 2026 (aged 64); Warwickshire, England
- Occupation: Writer
- Children: 2
- Writing career
- Genres: Science fiction Fantasy; Adventure novel

Justin Richards (14 September 1961 – 28 June 2026) was a British writer of science fiction, fantasy, and adventure fiction. He wrote science fiction and fantasy novels, including series set in Victorian and early 20th-century London, as well as contemporary adventure stories. He was best known for writing numerous spin-off novels, reference books, and audio plays based on the long-running BBC science fiction television series Doctor Who. Richards served as Creative Consultant for the BBC Books range of Doctor Who novels until 2017.

== Background ==
Richards was born in Epping, Essex, on 14 September 1961. After attending Dean Close School in Cheltenham, he obtained a BA (Hons) in English and Theatre at the University of Warwick.

As well as his literary career, Richards worked as a technical writer, editor, programmer, and user interface designer at IBM, and as an errand boy in a hotel.

Richards was married and had two sons, Julian and Chris. He lived in Warwickshire until his death on 28 June 2026, at the age of 64. He had been suffering from early-onset dementia in the years prior to his death.

== Work ==
Richards' first published novels were based on Doctor Who, appearing in the Virgin New Adventures, Virgin Missing Adventures, and Virgin Decalog series. He continued to write for BBC Books after it resumed publishing Doctor Who fiction. As well as producing numerous novels, audiobooks, activity books, and reference books, he served as Creative Consultant for the BBC Books range of Doctor Who novels.

In 2003, Richards began writing a series of crime novels for children (The Invisible Detective), whose parallel plots, set in the 1930s and the present day, reflected a fascination with time and temporal paradox that was also evident in the Time Runners series, published in 2007–08. His more action-oriented books included the Agent Alfie series for younger readers and a series of action-adventure novels for young teenagers co-written with Jack Higgins. Other works incorporated supernatural elements, including the Department of Unclassified Artefacts novels and the School of Night series.

His novel The Chaos Code won the Hull Children's Book Award in 2008. Demon Storm (from the School of Night series) was shortlisted for the Southampton's Favourite Book Award in 2011.

Richards also wrote audio plays for Big Finish Productions, original audiobooks, and television scripts, including for Five's soap opera Family Affairs. In 2011, he ventured into electronic publishing through his own publishing company, Braxiatek. His novel The Skeleton Clock was released digitally later that year.

== Books ==
=== Books based on the Doctor Who series ===
==== For Virgin Books ====
- Virgin New Adventures
  - Theatre of War (1994)
  - Dragons' Wrath (1997)
  - The Medusa Effect (1998)
  - Tears of the Oracle (1999)
  - The Joy Device (1999)
  - The Doomsday Manuscript (2000) – featuring Professor Bernice Summerfield
- Virgin Missing Adventures
  - System Shock (1995)
  - The Sands of Time (1996)
- Virgin Decalog
  - Decalog 3, Consequences (1996) (editor, with Andy Lane)
  - Decalog 4, Re:generations (1997) (editor, with Andy Lane)
  - Dependence Day (Decalog 4, Re:generations, 1997) (with Andy Lane)

==== For BBC Books ====
- Past Doctor Adventures
  - Dreams of Empire (1998)
  - Millennium Shock (1999)
  - Grave Matter (2000)
  - The Shadow in the Glass (2001) (with Stephen Cole)
- Eighth Doctor Adventures
  - Option Lock (1998)
  - Demontage (1999)
  - The Banquo Legacy (2000) (with Andy Lane)
  - The Burning (2000)
  - Time Zero (2002)
  - Sometime Never... (2004)
- New Series Adventures
  - Ninth Doctor
    - The Clockwise Man (2005)
    - The Deviant Strain (2005)
  - Tenth Doctor
    - The Resurrection Casket (2006)
    - Martha in the Mirror (2008)
  - Eleventh Doctor
    - Apollo 23 (2010)
    - Plague of the Cybermen (2013)
  - Twelfth Doctor
- Quick Reads
  - Code of the Krillitanes (2010)
- The Darksmith Legacy
  - 1: The Dust of Ages (2009)
  - 4: The Depths of Despair (2009)
  - 7: The Planet of Oblivion (2009)
  - 10: The End of Time (2009)
- Graphic novels
  - The Only Good Dalek (2010) (with artist Mike Collins)
- Activity books
  - Time Lord in Training (2007) – with press-out and make models
- Reference books
  - The Book of Lists (1997) (with Andrew Martin)
  - The Legend (2003)
  - The Legend Continues (2005)
- The Doctor Who Monsters Books
  - 1: Monsters And Villains (2005)
  - 2: Aliens and Enemies (2006)
  - 3: Creatures and Demons (2007)
  - 4: Starships and Spacestations (2008)
  - The Ultimate Monster Guide (2009) – a collection of reworked extracts from the earlier books together with new material.
  - "Doctor Who: The Secret Lives of Monsters" (Oct. 2014)
- Doctor Who Files
  - Taking Mickey in 5: Mickey (2006) (main writer Moray Laing)
  - A Dog's Life in 6: K-9 (2006) (main writer Jacqueline Rayner)
  - Mission to Galacton in 7: The Daleks (2006) (main writer Jacqueline Rayner)
  - Going off the Rails in 8: The Cybermen (2006) (main writer Jacqueline Rayner)
  - Needle Point in 9: Martha (2007) (main writer Moray Laing)
  - 10: Captain Jack (2007) including the story Best Friends
  - Birth of a Legend in 11: The Cult of Skaro (2007) (main writer Matt Kemp)
  - 12: The TARDIS (2007) including the story The Secret of the Stones
  - 13: The Sontarans (2008) including the story Blind Terror
  - Disappearing Act in 14: The Ood (2008) (main writer Moray Laing)

==== For BBC Audiobooks ====
- The Sarah Jane Adventures (original stories for Audio CD)
  - The Thirteenth Stone (2007)

==== For Big Finish Short Trips ====
- Short Trips: Companions
  - The Splintered Gate (2003)
- Short Trips: The Muses
  - The Glass Princess (Clio) (2003)

=== The Invisible Detective ===
Set in London in the 1930s, the series recounts the adventures of Arthur (Art) Drake, Jonny Levin, Meg Wallace and Flinch, who invented the "Invisible Detective" Brandon Lake and who investigate all his cases themselves. Each story has a parallel subplot set in the 2000s, where Art's grandson, also named Art, and his friend Sarah have related mysteries to solve.

1. The Paranormal Puppet Show (2003) (published as Double Life in America)
2. Shadow Beast (2003)
3. Ghost Soldiers (2003)
4. Killing Time (2003)
5. Faces of Evil (2004)
6. Web of Anubis (2004)
7. Stage Fright (2005)
8. Legion of the Dead (2005)

=== Chance Twins (Rich and Jade) ===
(written with Jack Higgins)

- Sure Fire (2006)
- Death Run (2007)
- Sharp Shot (2009)
- First Strike (2009)

=== Department of Unclassified Artefacts novels ===
A series of books set in Victorian London (1886) describing the adventures of Eddie Hopkins, Liz Oldfield, Sir William Protheroe of the British Museum's secret 'Department of Unclassified Artefacts' and his assistant George Archer.

- The Death Collector (2006) – the characters meet (after Eddie steals George Archer's wallet) and together uncover an ancient secret.
- The Parliament of Blood (2008) – the characters discover the legends of the Book of the Undead and take on the vampire parliament.
- The Chamber of Shadows (2010) – the characters investigate the deadly Tick-Tock Killer and discover a link with a thousand-year-old tyrant king deep in a chamber beneath London.
- The Suicide Exhibition (2015) – Elizabeth and Eddie appear as secondary characters as the Nazis stir up long-vanished aliens in 1940.
- The Blood Red City (2016) – continuing the World War II storyline.

=== Time Runners series ===
A series of books which chronicle the adventures of schoolboy Jamie Grant who falls through a time break and becomes a Runner along with the mysterious Anna, with power to control time and a duty to protect it from malign interference by the sinister Darkling Midnight.

- Freeze-Framed (2007)
- Rewind Assassin (2007)
- Past Forward (2008)
- Wipe Out (2008)

=== Agent Alfie ===
1. Thunder Raker (2008)
2. Sorted! (2009)
3. Licence to Fish (2009)

=== The School of Night ===
A supernatural horror series, described by the publisher as "perfect for readers not yet old enough for Darren Shan".

- Demon Storm (2010)
- Creeping Terror (2011)

=== Other novels ===
- The Chaos Code (2007) – Matt Stribling discovers that his father has been searching for an ancient code, rumoured to have brought down the fabled civilisation of Atlantis, which has now fallen into the hands of a madman using high-tech computers to decipher it. Matt and Robin must traverse the globe in their efforts to stop the Chaos Code from being reactivated.
- Monster Island (2011) – part of the Heroes series of novels for young boys together with teaching aids published by Heinemann.
- The Skeleton Clock (2011) – in an imagined future flooded London, the long-buried head of an immortal is uncovered and attempts to reunite some special chess men, a chess board, and a crucial piece of mechanism (the Skeleton Clock) to return himself to a body.

== Audio plays ==
=== Adaptations ===
- Dragons' Wrath (2000, adapted from the 1997 novel)
- Theatre of War (2015, adapted from the 1994 novel)

=== Original plays ===
- Whispers of Terror (1999)
- Red Dawn (2000)
- The Time of the Daleks (2002)
- The Renaissance Man (2012)
- The Rani Elite (2014)
- The Worlds of Doctor Who (2014; with Jonathan Morris and Nick Wallace)
- The Darkness of Glass (2015)
- The Vaults of Osiris (2015)
- Prisoners of the Lake (2015)
- The Forsaken (2015)
- Wave of Destruction (2016)
- Vampire of the Mind (2016)
- The Beast of Kravenos (2017)

=== Gallifrey series ===
- The Inquiry (series 1, episode 3: 2004)
- Pandora (series 2, episode 3: 2005)
- Disassembled (series 4, episode 2: 2011)
- Ascension (series 6, episode 3: 2013)

=== Jago & Litefoot series ===
- The Bloodless Soldier (series 1, episode 1: 2010)
- Litefoot and Sanders (series 2, episode 1: 2011)
- Dead Men's Tales (series 3, episode 1: 2011)
- The Hourglass Killers (series 4, episode 4: 2012)
- The Final Act (series 5, episode 4: 2013)
- The Trial of George Litefoot (series 6, episode 4: 2013)
- The Wax Princess (series 7, episode 4: 2014)
- Higson & Quick (series 8, episode 4: 2014)
- The Devil's Dicemen (series 9, episode 2: 2015)
- Return of the Nightmare (series 9, episode 4: 2015)
- The Museum of Curiosities (series 10, episode 4: 2015)
- Jago & Litefoot & Strax: The Haunting (special: 2015)
- Masterpiece (series 11, episode 4: 2016)
- Picture This (series 12, episode 1: 2016)
- Warm Blood (series 12, episode 4: 2016)
- Too Much Reality (series 13, episode 4: 2017)
- A Command Performance (series 14, episode 4: 2021) (co-written with Julian Richards)

=== Bernice Summerfield series ===
- Many Happy Returns (anniversary special; with Xanna Eve Chown, Stephen Cole, Paul Cornell, Stephen Fewell, Simon Guerrier, Scott Handcock, Rebecca Levene, Jacqueline Rayner, Miles Richardson, Eddie Robson and Dave Stone)

=== Counter-Measures series ===
- State of Emergency (series 1, episode 4: 2012)
- The Concrete Cage (series 3, episode 2: 2014)

=== The Diary of River Song series ===
- I Went to a Marvellous Party (series 1, episode 2: 2015)

=== The Churchill Years series ===
- Living History (series 1, episode 3: 2016)
