= Escape room video game =

Point-and-click adventure sub-genre

An escape room video game, also known as escape the room, room escape, or escape game, is a subgenre of point-and-click adventure game which requires a player to escape from imprisonment by exploiting their surroundings. The room usually consists of a locked door, objects to manipulate, and hidden clues or secret compartments. The player must use the objects to interact with other items in the room to reveal a way to escape. Escape the room games were born out of freeware browser games created in Adobe Flash, but have since become most popular as mobile games for iOS and Android. Some examples include Crimson Room, Viridian Room, MOTAS, and Droom (playable until mid-2012). The popularity of these online games has led to the development of real-life escape rooms all around the world.

Elements of escape the room games can be found in other adventure games, such as Myst and Nine Hours, Nine Persons, Nine Doors, where a complete puzzle is solved by evaluating the elements within a single room. Games like The Room may also present virtual puzzle boxes that are solved in a similar manner to escape games, by finding out how to open the puzzle box using visual clues on the box and around the environment.

== Origin ==
Early video games that featured a theme of a player escaping a single location date back at least to the text adventure Behind Closed Doors, in which the player is trapped inside a restroom. Myst (1993) would feature elements of escape-the-room styled games such as clicking and draging various items across a screen to interact with the gameplay world. While developers made sequels and similar games to Myst, adventure game sales flattened. Rand Miller, one of Cyan's co-founders, described Myst as "too big" and "too hard to top". Vox writer Alex Abad-Santos stated that while adventure games with more open exploration may be "too aimless", the appeal of escape room games is in their immediacy and constricted world.

The term originated in 2001 from the MOTAS game, though there are many older examples of the point-and-click variation, such as Noctropolis, and even earlier examples from the text adventure canon. The genre was further popularized in 2004 by the Japanese "Crimson Room" game by Toshimitsu Takagi, which has spread throughout the internet and can be seen on many gaming websites.

== Structure ==
Most escape-the-room games play from a first-person perspective, where the player must click on objects to interact with them. Most room escape games offer only token plots, usually a short cut scene consisting only of text to establish how the player got there, and sometimes another when the game is finished. Room escapes usually have a minimalistic interface, ambient soundtrack, and no non-player characters; these elements can enhance the gamer's sense of isolation.

During gameplay the player must click on objects to either interact with them or add them to their inventory. As the player passes the mouse over the game screen, usually the mouse cursor will change shape (e.g. to a hand or different kind of arrow) if the item under the cursor can be used, opened, manipulated, collected, searched or (if an exit) followed, but some games do not provide such hints to the player. If the object cannot be collected, opened, used or manipulated, the player is usually assumed to be inspecting it; in most cases, the player will see a brief text description. The player must collect items and use them with various objects (or other items in the inventory) to find a way to get out of the room. Some games require the player to solve several rooms in succession. Some require significant amounts of pixel hunting (tedious searching for a small clickable area), which can frustrate players. For example, when reviewing the PSP game "Crimson Room Reverse" (a collection of room escape games that were originally free online flash games), critic Brad Gallaway said, "Key items are often hidden behind other items, and the player has no way of knowing these areas exist or that it's possible to search there unless the cursor falls in a very specific location, sometimes a "hot spot" as small as a few pixels."
