= The Invisible Detective =

Book series by Justin Richards

- Author: Justin Richards
- Cover artist: David Frankland, Richard Jones
- Country: United Kingdom
- Language: English
- Genre: Detective fiction, Science fiction, Fantasy
- Published: 2003 - 2005
- Media type: Print

The Invisible Detective is a series of juvenile adventure novels, written by Justin Richards. Originally published in the United Kingdom between 2003 and 2005, the series has also been released in the United States.

The books are detective fiction with science fictional and/or fantastic elements (depending on the book). Set in London in the 1930s, the series recounts the adventures of four children, Art, Jonny, Meg, and Flinch, who act as "Baker Street Irregulars" to the detective Brandon Lake, who is known as "the Invisible Detective" as no one has seen more than his silhouetted figure in a darkened room. In fact, Brandon Lake does not exist; he was invented by the four children, who investigate all his cases themselves. Art plays the Invisible Detective in weekly sessions held in a darkened room, during which the Detective addresses the concerns of local residents, in exchange for a small fee.

Each book also has a parallel subplot set in the 2000s, where Art's grandson, also named Art, and his friend Sarah have related mysteries to solve.

== Titles ==
The Invisible Detective book series
Book Number	Title	Publication Date	ISBN	Cover Illustrator	Length (Pages)	Ref.
1	The Paranormal Puppet Show (renamed Double Life in America)	June 2, 2003	ISBN 0-7434-6145-2	David Frankland (current); Richard Jones (original)	264	
2	Shadow Beast	June 2, 2003	ISBN 0-7434-6146-0	David Frankland (current); Richard Jones (original)	220	
3	Ghost Soldiers	October 2, 2003	ISBN 0-7434-6224-6	David Frankland (current); Richard Jones (original)	260	
4	Killing Time	October 2, 2003	ISBN 0-7434-6225-4	David Frankland (current); Richard Jones (original)	227	
5	Faces of Evil (Note: Original title "The Faces of Evil". When the book was reprinted, "The" in the title was removed.)	April 2004	ISBN 0-7434-7871-1	David Frankland (current); Richard Jones (original)	264	
6	Web of Anubis	May 2004	ISBN 0-689-86124-9	David Frankland (Note: All the covers were redesigned by the new artist, Frankland, and all new books (Web of Anubis onwards) had Frankland's art as the original.)	307	
7	Stage Fright	September 2005	ISBN Unknown	David Frankland	320	
8	Legion of the Dead	September 2005	ISBN Unknown	David Frankland	288	

== Characters ==
=== Protagonists ===
The series revolves around the cases of eponymous detective, Brandon Lake. The books' protagonists are the Cannoniers, a group of four children in 1930s London who solve mysteries. They are based out of Cannon Street, hence their name. They invent the character of Brandon Lake and portray him in weekly consulting sessions in a darkened room. The Cannoniers are:

- Arthur "Art" Drake: The leader of the Cannoniers, Art possesses good leadership skills and often develops the plans for the group. Though tall for a 14-year-old boy, he is slightly built, with dark brown hair. He acts as Brandon Lake, the Invisible Detective, providing his voice and silhouette figure in the armchair.
- Flinch: The youngest of the Cannoniers at only 9 or 10 years of age, Flinch is short and slight of build, with long, bedraggled hair. She lives on the streets without any family that she knows of. Besides being streetwise, she can also squeeze through small gaps by dislocating her joints at will.
- Jonny Levin: A thin 13-year-old with short black hair, Jonny mans a fishing rod during Lake's consulting sessions, which he uses to flick hastily written messages to Art in the armchair when necessary. The line is invisible in the near darkness of the room. Jonny is a quick runner, a skill he developed due to frequent bullying from older boys at school. He also serves as the treasurer of the Cannoniers due to his talent for handling money.
- Margaret "Meg" Wallace: Almost as tall and old as Art, Meg prefers wearing very covering clothes, such as long-sleeved shirts and high-necked collars. She has long auburn hair and rarely smiles. She can instinctively tell when someone is lying, which she learned from being around her violent father and uncaring brothers.

Art's grandson, Arthur Drake II, is a main character who lives in the present day. In The Paranormal Puppet Show, Arthur seeks shelter from the rain in an antique shop, where he buys Art's famous casebook and the loadstone that was used to control the puppets in 1936. Throughout the books, he learns about the Cannoniers' cases, and in Stage Fright, the loadstone switches him and his grandfather, sending him to 1937 London and Art to the present day.

=== Recurring characters ===
Recurring characters in the series include:

- Sarah Bustle: Sarah goes to the same school as Arthur, but is a year above him. She has long black hair that she often wears in a ponytail. She lives with her mother, Linda, and her 7-year-old brother, Paul. She is very headstrong, somewhat like Meg. In Ghost Soldiers, Sarah is revealed to be behind a series of modern websites dedicated to the Invisible Detective.
- Detective Sergeant Peter Drake: Peter Drake, a Scotland Yard detective, is the father of Art Drake, the leader of Cannoniers, and the great-grandfather of Arthur Drake. He often works the same cases as the Cannoniers, leading Art to rely on him for clues at times.
- Charles "Charlie" Etherbridge, Earl of Fotherington: Charlie is an elderly man with a wrinkled face and a kind voice and eyes. He becomes allied with the Cannoniers after alerting them to a watchman searching empty buildings where they were hiding. He becomes a representative for the Invisible Detective, but not does learn the truth about "Brandon Lake" until Faces of Evil. He can speak Latin.
- Harry Jerrickson: Harry Jerrickson is the owner of the antique shop where Arthur seeks shelter in The Paranormal Puppet Show. He is friends with Art Drake, Arthur's grandfather.
- Albert Norris: Albert Norris is the landlord of the Dog and Goose pub. He and his customers are often drive the plots of the books by bringing cases to the Invisible Detective. Norris is described as a large man, almost as broad as he is round.
