= The Life Stage: Virtual House =

1993 video game

- Developer: Microcabin
- Publisher: Matsushita Electric Corporation of America
- Platform: 3DO Interactive Multiplayer
- Release: NA: March 1993; JP: March 20, 1994
- Genres: Construction simulation Adventure
- Mode: Single-player

The Life Stage: Virtual House is a construction simulation/adventure game developed by Microcabin for the 3DO Interactive Multiplayer. The player is given tools to create virtual living spaces and may also view several predesigned virtual homes. The Life Stage: Virtual House was a launch title for the 3DO in Japan.

== Reception ==
The game was scored a total of 21 out of 40 by the four reviewers of the Japanese magazine Weekly Famicom Tsūshin (Famitsu).
