= The Chaos Code =

2007 novel by Justin Richards

- First edition (publ. Faber & Faber)
- Author: Justin Richards
- Language: English
- Publication date: 2007

The Chaos Code is a 2007 science-fiction/fantasy novel for young teenagers by British author Justin Richards.

The novel won the Hull Children's Book Award in 2008.

== Synopsis ==
Matt Stribling, a 15-year-old boy on holiday from boarding school, finds his archaeologist father missing under mysterious circumstances. He discovers that his father has been working on an ancient code which may have caused the downfall of ancient civilisations. Now a madman has the code and wants to use it to dominate the universe.

== Reception ==
Publishers Weekly gave the book a mixed review, praising its action, but criticizing its shallow characters and implausible events. Kirkus Reviews was more positive, stating that the book "will capture the reader’s attention and keep them turning pages long after lights out."
