= Piposh (2021 video game) =

2021 video game

- Steam art
- Developers: Renan and Roy Gluzman
- Series: Piposh
- Platforms: Microsoft Windows, MacOS, Linux
- Release: April 1, 2021
- Genre: Graphic adventure

Piposh (Hebrew: פיפוש) is a 2021 episodic adventure video game and a reboot of the Piposh video game franchise which was developed by Israeli studio Guillotine from 1999 to 2003. The point-and-click games center around the adventures of failed actor Hezi Piposh, and see players explore, collect items, and interact with characters to advance through the plot. The new title was originally to be a 'four-part trilogy', with the first installment being released in September 2019. This was later changed to a complete title, which was released on April 1, 2021.

== Development ==
=== Conception ===
The original game's creators brothers Renan and Roy Gluzman announced that after 20 years since working on the series together, they would reunite to reboot Piposh. The push for a new entry in the franchise had been organised by a grassroots movement for many years; loyal fans had created two popular Facebook pages named "פיפוש / Piposh" and "חזי פיפוש", had regularly met up at Piposh conventions, and had been building anticipation. Over the years, a large community of fans who loved and reminisced over the series "ran Facebook groups, organized events and constantly asked for a new game". Ronen had resisted the urge to revisiting the series earlier, as "the trauma of creating a computer game of such a megalomaniac size is still well remembered"; he empathised with a fan-made project from 2008 earlier that was cancelled early. Having not seen each other since the development of the original Piposh in 1999, the duo met up in 2018 and found that Piposh was the first topic that came up. While they were originally just toying with the idea, it became a reality when Elad Tabakov – a long-time fan of the series who had become aware of the conversation.

=== Design ===
While the original game was created by only the Gluzmans, the new title has a team of seven people. As with the 1999's Piposh, the brothers are the creators, screenwriting the title. Meanwhile, Gal Pasternak and Gal Hajaj worked on the technical aspects, while Elad Tabakov was managing the project. Roy Gluzman created the characters and concept art, Nir Sachrur created the animation, and Amir Dwek designed the environment. The Gluzmans have noted that the staff members resurrecting the game were once the generation that grew up on it, who genuinely want it to come back. They have acknowledged that there had never been a logical business strategy behind Piposh, which extends to this title. Roy said they're "working out of the joy of creation" since its development cannot be justified from a financial perspective, noting that they closed Guillotine down in 2003 specifically due to a lack of sales.

While at the time of the original Piposh's release its target audience was a relatively small niche who understood computer games and how to operate them, in the 2020s the developers wanted to make the game accessible to the mass market. One way they did this is to make it compatible with mobile devices. Secondly, taking a cue from Telltale Games projects like The Walking Dead the original plan was to divide the experience into easy-to-digest chapters of three to four hours each, with decisions affecting the future narrative. Segmenting the title was to allow the development time to be dramatically shortened, with the first chapter able be released within a year. They later decided to release the entire game in one for early 2021.

The "interactive, serialized adventure" features two-dimensional graphics as in the first two games of the series, moving away from the 3D animation used in the third title. The Gluzmans chose this as they could see finished visual assets very quickly. Dweck has noted the level of creative freedom the team has, in that while character designs are being kept to the same proportions as the original, the team is able to build upon the "grotesque...unique, wild style" of the original game. Meanwhile, the title's game world is being designed to be "rich, diverse and intriguing", and animations were intended to be an improvement. A new character – Egyptian film star Tawfiq Bibush – was given a three-dimensional personality.

In November 2018, Renan and Roy suggested the plot might revolve around Piposh trying to sabotage a Hollywood production in order to promote himself to leading man, only for his plan to be halted by the discovery of a murder. Noting that the voice actor for Fritz von Bezzez, Amos Shuv died in 2015, Roy acknowledged that they would have to find a creative solution to putting him into the game as a guest star is they chose to. Additionally Mani Peer has similarly died since the original games were published. However the developers were interested in getting Shai Avivi to reprise his role.

=== Announcement and release ===
The same year in September, The Gluzmans announced on the Facebook group for GamesIS – a non-profit organisation promoting and supporting the Israeli digital gaming industry – that he was working on four gaming projects, without mentioning Piposh. In mid September, he posted to Facebook asking for developers and designers to contact him via private message to work on an upcoming Piposh project.

On November 15, the developers set up a Piposh campaign on crowdfunding site Patreon for fans of the series to be able to contribute financially to the reboot. The same day the Patreon page was linked to the official "פיפוש המשחק החדש" Facebook page for the reboot. Tabakov wanted to pursue this for the fans who wanted to see Piposh return despite content creation, especially game-making, being difficult within Israel. He acknowledged that as "the adventure games industry in Israel is almost nonexistent", this was an opportunity to bring both Piposh and the notion of original local gaming content back to life, requiring financial support from fans to pull it off. The campaign took place during the game's development, and backers received regular updates, live broadcasts with illustrators and creators, and merchandise. Mako deemed the use of Patreon over Kickstarter as a wise decision, as the fixed monthly income model "allows game developers a greater breathing space and assures them, if they have recruited enough supporters, that the budget will not end in the middle". While Patreon is an "unusual choice" due to being little known is Israel, it was chosen over popular crowdfunding sites like Kickstarter and the Israeli Headstart due to them requiring more in their pitches than "charisma and nostalgia"; the Gluzmans noted that when the campaign was launched, they were in the early stages of development rather than in the process of being published. A Headstart page was later set up.

In preparation for the comeback, on December 4 the brothers presented an artist's workshop at the 2018 Utopia Festival where they explained how their virtual world built a "compelling and cohesive" audience, as well as some plans for the upcoming title. The developers commented that they had no intention of restraining themselves or creating anything subjecting themselves to commercial or economic considerations.

In 2019, the developers launched a second Headstart campaign to publish the game in early 2020. The developers raised 100,000 NIS out of the 150,000 NIS goal by June. On the 30th, they hit 203,182 NIS out of the 150,000.

In mid 2019, Piposh: The Audition was released as a prologue and a demo for a fully released Piposh game coming early 2020. It has 35 minutes of gameplay.

Originally, the game was supposed to be released in September 2019. It was later delayed to March 2020, then delayed again to September. Eventually, it was released on April 1, 2021 through Steam. While the full version of the game was released in Hebrew, full English support is expected for future updates.

== Critical reception ==
=== Pre-release ===
Geekloid noted that in light of the series' popularity, they expected the number of Patreon supporters to rise. Calcalist wrote that the series has been revived through the proliferation of indie games. Noting that the game is arriving after a "two-decade lull" in the franchise, Gadgety anticipated that the new title will make them laugh again like the previous games used to do. Additionally, the site felt that projects such as this could be the "beginning of a new era in the local industry with larger games with more extensive and meaningful content". Mako deemed the announcement likely the most exciting piece of gaming news for 2018. Gadgety suggested the game is not "just for nostalgic gamers", and also aimed at a generation of new players.

=== Release ===
IGN gave Piposh: Audition 9/10, praising its "extreme characters, the witty dialogues, the unique animation style". Gamers Pack felt the title "goes out of its way to appeal to fans and preserve the magic of the original games". Frogi wrote that the full game was "expected to be highly viral".
