= MOTAS =

2001 video game

Mystery Of Time And Space
- Developer: Jan Albartus
- Publisher: Jan Albartus
- Composers: Sam Cardon; John Frederick Coots, Haven Gillespie (Level 8); Dorothy Fields, Jerome Kern (Levels 9 & 13)
- Release: First version: November 2001 (25 years ago); Current version: May 2008 (18 years ago)
- Genres: Escape the room, Puzzle

The Mystery of Time and Space (commonly known as MOTAS) is a popular online graphic adventure game created by Jan Albartus (LOGAN). The game was produced using Macromedia Flash (now Adobe Flash) and was an early influential example of the escape the room genre. There are 20 levels of varying length, some consisting of a single room and others consisting of a large network of rooms. Though advertised as a constant work-in-progress with "new levels coming soon," MOTAS has not been updated since May 2008.

The game is currently available in 15 languages, including English, French, German, Japanese, and both traditional Chinese and simplified Chinese. There is also a moderated chat room available for players to discuss the game.

The levels have been noted for their jazz soundtrack, especially the Christmas-themed Level 8 and its jazz representation of "Santa Claus Is Coming to Town". Levels 9 and 13 play a MIDI version of "The Way You Look Tonight".

== Gameplay ==
As with most games of this genre, the player interacts with the environment within the game by pointing at and clicking the elements within the game's environment in order to solve the game's puzzles, with many of them exhibiting a high technology and science fiction influence. The environment may be "searched" by clicking at various spots within the game's environments to uncover hidden items; for example, in the first room, the player has to retrieve a hidden key under the bed's pillow. Retrieved items can then be used to interact with elements within the environment to solve puzzles. A player uses retrieved items by clicking on it in their inventory (shown on the upper left corner), and then clicking on the element within the environment to interact with the element using the selected item. Taking the key from the previous example, a player can click on it when it is in their inventory, and then click on the cupboard's door again to open the cupboard using the retrieved key. If the item is not meant for the element, then nothing happens. Again using the key as an example: if the player tries to use the key on the door instead of the cupboard, nothing happens and the door remains locked.

Often, solving one part of the puzzle will reveal items, codes (passwords), or pathways that in turn that help solve another part of the puzzle. The aforementioned cupboard, for example, yields a screwdriver, and the screwdriver is used to unscrew the painting, which yields a screw in return, and so on. The player must often apply lateral thinking when trying to find uses for the items retrieved in order to solve the puzzles. Codes can be in a variety of formats, usually involving simple number sequences but can also be as complex as involving colours, directions and binary; these must be entered into the appropriate elements inside the game's environment correctly in order to advance through the game.

Some of the puzzles may be presented as a single element within the game's environment itself, rather than involving multiple items and elements within the game's environment; these are usually presented in the form of locks preventing access to other elements or pathways. For example, in one of the rooms on the tenth level, the player must unlock a safe by solving a circular, colourful pie chart-like puzzle, through interaction with the elements of the puzzle itself.

Many elements within the game, such as many pieces of furniture and some of the puzzles themselves, can be interacted with without using any additional items. For example, unlocked doors can be opened simply by clicking on them, and some chairs can be moved around by clicking on them.

As the game advances, the gameplay itself steadily evolves at the same time, the levels and puzzles gradually becoming more complex and multi-layered. Levels begin taking place over multiple rooms at once and eventually ventures into an outside world beyond locked buildings. In later levels, the player acquires a device called the Manipulator of Time and Space (MOTAS) device, which takes the player back to previous levels via time travel in order to retrieve items; the player then returns to the current level to solve the puzzles using the items retrieved.

== Plot ==
Unique among many games of this genre, MOTAS features a plot that changes and evolves as the player advances through the course of the game. MOTAS begins in a relatively formulaic fashion; as is the convention in escape the room games, the player awakens in a bedroom that is locked from the outside with no memory of prior events. As the game progresses, the player discovers several elements throughout the game's environment that suggest the player is a clone, such as a letter left on a table in one of the rooms on the seventh level regarding an escaped clone, and a manual about cloning left on a table in the eleventh level, which leaves the player wondering about their existence afterwards. There are also subtle hints throughout the game suggesting that the player may be an alien, such as at the end of level eight the player puts on what is described as an "Alien Suit". Depictions of aliens can also be found throughout the game: for example, on the ninth level the player sees the dead body of an alien lying outside a crashed UFO in the first room.

Both possibilities are most strongly hinted at on the sixteenth level. On that level, an encrypted mission report, written by an unknown group of persons aboard an "artificial moon" and left on a computer to be discovered and decrypted by the player, mentions clones being trained in a "Logic Training facility" on the artificial moon along with the discovery of a planet that is named by the writers as "Terra Prime", and is reported as being called Earth by its inhabitants. This strongly suggests that the writers may be extraterrestrial aliens; the report also mentions hostilities from the inhabitants of the planet after the writers' presence in the Solar System was uncovered, and of the measures taken against it by the writers of the report, including the creation of a clone to "hopefully save the planet"; this clone is hinted at the end of the report as being the player.

One plot suggestion has been dismissed though: on the eighth level of the game, a figure in a pink alien suit was shown apparently following the player by exiting one of the two doors inside a room after the player has left the level; this figure was revealed in the seventeenth level to be merely the player themselves, the pink colour explained as the result of an accident while attempting to hide behind the door. The version of the player in the pink suit had travelled from the future using the MOTAS device; the item also helps serve to further the game's metafictional elements.

Other elements that serve as plot suggestions include a book named after the game itself, various notes left behind by persons unknown throughout the game (with one reading "No unauthorised time travel"), and the use of portals and teleportation devices to advance between some levels of the game.

== Development ==
MOTAS was created in November 2001. At that time MOTAS was hosted on a free web server and the game featured only one room (level). In February 2002, a counter was added. As of May 2008, MOTAS has 20 levels plus the guestbook/end level. At several points, the game became so popular that bandwidth became a problem, and so the game was moved to another web host.

== Reception ==
Mystery of Time and Space is considered to be a highly significant escape the room adventure that helped propel the genre to significance as a subset of online games. It has been referenced in other adventure games, such as the similarly alien-themed Cybee's Adventure, in which a "MOTAS Deluxe box" appears as an item. The credits of the seminal escape the room adventure Crimson Room name MOTAS as an inspiration. Channel 4 has commented on the game, describing it as "a treat" with "intricate problems", although it also criticized the game for the obscurity and difficulty of its puzzles. Nytimes.com mentioned MOTAS in its article "GAME THEORY; A Little Getaway: Small, Simple, Fast and Fun". MOTAS is also mentioned in an article on TheStar.com: "For lots of gamers, escapism means starting out in a trap - 'Room escape' games, with their endless variations, are booming". PCWorld.com wrote: 'If you liked the Crimson and Viridian rooms, you'll get a kick out of "Mystery of Time and Space," a 12-level game of the same ilk as the "rooms."' The game Bonte Room also references MOTAS in the walkthrough.
