= Time Runners =

Series of fantasy novels

- Freeze-Framed; Rewind Assassin; Past Forward; Wipe Out
- Author: Justin Richards
- Country: United Kingdom
- Language: English
- Genre: Fantasy, young adult fiction, thriller
- Publisher: Simon & Schuster (UK)
- Published: March 2007 — August 2008
- Media type: Print (hardcover and paperback)

Time Runners is a series of fantasy novels written by the British author Justin Richards. The books chronicle the adventures of schoolboy Jamie Grant who falls through a "time break" and becomes a Runner along with the mysterious Anna, with power to control time and a duty to protect it from malign interference by the sinister Darkling Midnight.

The first novel Freeze-Framed was released in March 2007, and since then three further books have been added to the series.

== Plot ==
The novels are narrated in the first person by the schoolboy Jamie Grant, who at the start of the first book is twelve years old and has just started a new school. The Time Runners of the series title are people who fall through a time break and who therefore "no longer exist": their existence fades away until they cannot be seen and are not remembered, though this can be averted temporarily by them reminding people it gets to the point eventually where they cannot be seen at all but they continue an existence outside time, with some degree of power over it. Those who are lost are told there is no way to return to reality. Jamie works with a young runner called Anna who has been 14 for a long time and guides him. The Runners comprise an alliance from many places and times who work to protect time from the interference of those who wish to alter reality to meet their image of a perfect world by changing history, the main antagonist is Darkling midnight an Adept (someone with a very powerful control over time) who the Runners see as their enemy, and who is assisted by evil time creatures called Skitters. Midnight is at times threatening but can be very courteous. H

The Runners appear to remain fixed at the age they were when they fell outside time, so once Jamie becomes a Runner he remains at twelve years old throughout the remaining books.

While Runners are not remembered and do not have a place in time, they can be given the ability to be seen and interact with the real world. Over the course of the series, Jamie and Anna discover that they have been misled and that a difficult, though rare, method to return home exists, which requires a significant sacrifice.

=== Freeze-Framed ===
In the first book of the series, the narrator, Jamie Grant, is introduced, along with his mum and dad and little sister Ellie. Jamie is having trouble settling at school when he meets Anna, a Runner who appears to be fourteen years old but is later revealed to have many years of experience as a Runner. She attempts to protect Jamie from his first encounter with Darkling Midnight, but Jamie falls through a time break and is rescued by Senex, Anna's partner in the alliance. He becomes a Runner, and is revealed to be very strong, and he starts to learn how to exercise his control over time.

=== Rewind Assassin ===
The second book of the series recounts the first mission on which Jamie and Anna are sent as Runners. They go to 1596 to prevent an assassination, and in the process meet William Shakespeare and Queen Elizabeth I.

=== Past Forward ===
The third book of the series is set in America in 2021, at a time when civilization has broken down after the assassination of the President. Jamie and Anna discover that someone is tampering with time, and sacrificing children in the process.

=== Wipe Out ===
The fourth book is set in the 1950s, in Britain during the Cold War. At the end of this book Jamie manages to generate a large sum of energy succeeds in returning Anna to her own time, along with twenty years of time in which to live life protected from midnight. He lies to her that there is enough energy to return them both home as he knows she would not let him do so otherwise. Both Darkling Midnight and Jamie arrive at the end of this time interval to meet the now-adult Anna who has no recollection of the Runners, and the book ends on a cliffhanger.
