= Sherwood Forest (video game) =

1982 video game

- Publisher: Phoenix Software
- Platforms: Apple II, FM-7, PC-88, PC-98
- Release: 1982
- Genre: Puzzle

Sherwood Forest is a puzzle video game published in 1982 by Phoenix Software.

== Gameplay ==
Sherwood Forest is a game in which the player solves puzzles to progress.

== Reception ==
John Besnard reviewed the game for Computer Gaming World, and stated that "Phoenix has put everything in place to allow them to create a really great adventure game. Sherwood Forest isn't bad, it's just too short."
