= Piposh =

Israeli video game series

- Cover image of the first game
- Genres: Point-and-click adventure, comedy
- Developers: Guillotine (Renan & Roy Gluzman)
- Publisher: Hed Artzi Multimedia
- First release: Piposh; 1999
- Latest release: Piposh; April 2021

Piposh (Hebrew: פיפוש) is an Israeli media franchise that started as a series of comedic point-and-click adventure video games developed by Guillotine and published by Hed Arzi Multimedia for Windows. Based on an eponymous actor-turned-detective who embarks on several adventures solving murders, the titles include Piposh, Piposh 2, Halom SheItgashem (spin-off), and Piposh 3D: HaMahapecha. An English version of Piposh entitled Piposh: Hollywood was published in 2002. The series, which began in 1999, was created at a time when the Israeli video gaming industry was at its peak, particularly in terms of adventure gaming, and served as a notable example of a work targeted specifically at the young local market, with aspects such as inside jokes relating to Israeli culture. The games became very popular within Israel, although never becoming financially successful, and its developers struggled to live off the proceeds.

Piposh evolved into a franchise, with a television series, a comic book, and a soundtrack being created. The series continues to have a dedicated fanbase, and Piposh conventions have been regularly held as a way for fans to celebrate the games together. While the titles have often been criticized for their amateurish visual style and clunky game mechanics, they are looked at fondly by critics who see Piposh as a source of Israeli pride and a key milestone in the advancement of the local industry throughout the 21st century. A reboot of the series was released in April 2021.

== Plot and gameplay ==
The series consists of point and click adventures, requiring players to interact with an inventory and with characters in order to complete puzzles and advance the story. The main character is intended to be a caricature of the arrogant Israeli, with a worldview that "the whole world is an idiot – and that talk can not be done quietly, only with shouting".

The plot of Piposh follows the quirky adventures of its main character, flawed actor Hezi Piposh and "morbidly tactless guy in his attempts to reach Hollywood and make it big". In the first game, he boards the wrong boat and has numerous antics, including being caught up in a murder. He can interrogate characters, break into their rooms, and accuse them of murder. In Piposh 2, Piposh finds himself trapped on an island populated by dwarves, who help him assemble an aviation device to escape. Halom SheHitgashem is focused on eight strange acquaintances who are invited to the castle of an eccentric man. Piposh 3D revolves around a political revolution that ensues because the entire country decides to become vegetarian, replacing meat with tofu.

== History ==
=== Conception and In the Interest of Ratings (1997–98) ===
In the late 1980 while brothers Renan and Roy Gluzman was at the age of 13 and 11, they began their computer gaming career by creating games and animations on Macromedia Mac Director software. After Renan left the Israeli army and while his brother Roy was still a member, they set up a small graphics business in Pardes Hanna (פרדס חנה), where they did routine projects for commission. In 1997, one of their projects reached the desk of the CEO of video game distributor Hed Artzi Multimedia (הד ארצי מולטימדיה), the multimedia arm of Israeli record label Hed Arzi Music, who liked the illustration style of the duo and suggested they create a Hebrew-language computer game. He gave them NIS 10,000 in return for 50% of the future profits from the sales.

Despite having no experience in the video gaming industry, the team went to work and after nine months of development, released In the Interest of Ratings (בתככי הרייטינג), a title which focused on the incompetent detective Elimelech Egoz (voiced by Moshe Ferster), who goes on holiday at the fictional Nofei Hadera Hotel only to be greeted by a bizarre murder case. The game contained intertextuality, inside jokes, irony, and cynicism. In the Interest of Ratings received negative reviews in the press, including in Internet Captain (קפטן האינטרנט), the technology/multimedia branch of the leading Israeli newspaper Haaretz, but it received positive reviews in youth-oriented newspapers. Ultimately the game was relatively popular, though it was not financially successful. Nevertheless, it led the duo to decide to try to develop a second video game, which would become Piposh, under their new development company Guillotine (גיליוטין).

Games released timeline
1999	Piposh game (פיפוש)
1999	Piposh and Other Vegetables comic book (פיפוש ושאר ירקות)
1999	Piposh Congress fan conventions (הקונגרס הפיפושי)
2000	Piposh 2 game (פיפוש 2)
2001	Halom SheItgashem game (חלום שהתגשם, spin-off)
2001	Batheshet Moav TV show (בטשת מואב, spin-off)
2002	Piposh Hollywood game (English remake of Piposh)
2003	Piposh 3D: HaMahapecha game (פיפוש 3די- המהפכה)
2004	At the Piposh Tavern (album)
2005
2006
2007
2008	Piposh 2.5 and the Stolen Vase game (fan-made; cancelled)
2009
2010
2011
2012
2013
2014
2015
2016
2017
2018
2019	Piposh reboot - First Demo
2020	Piposh reboot - Part 1
2021	Piposh (reboot)

=== Piposh (1998–99) ===
The Gluzman brothers wrote the text and the code, drew the backgrounds and characters, and created the animations; in addition they convinced actors Shai Avivi, Amos Shuv, Anat Magen, Ilan Peled, Dudu Zar, Meni Pe'er, and Ilan Ganani (as Piposh) to voice characters voluntarily. The game was developed by four people in a garage, at a time when the computer gaming industry in Israel was considered practically non-existent. Glutzman recalls that Guillotine was not particularly well managed, lacked business planning and didn't have a financial focus, and instead consisted of a naive team who wanted to simply make something "fun and cool". Ynet asserts the duo was irrational for choosing set up a development company for Israeli games that only appealed to the local market. Renan and Roy would later describe the contemporary Israeli video gaming industry as an imaginary thing to pursue, for four young developers working from their garage. During development, Ronan used the program Macromedia Director 4, and he created each game screens from scratch. At the time of the game's release, Ronan published his phone number to allow stuck players to phone in for help.

After a year and a half of development, Piposh was released; it became a hit among teenagers and sold 6000 copies over a period of one year in retail sales, and would ultimately sell or over 7000 copies. They achieved this without reducing the original selling price. Haaretz asserts that many thousands more probably illegally pirated it. The game reached 5th place on the sales charts, and for a few weeks was competitive with the best-selling games from abroad. Some of Piposh's royalties were donated to the animal rights and welfare organizations. The game originally had text and voice-work in Hebrew, though a few years later it was made available in both English and Russian, and due to its success Guillotine was able to distribute the games to the United States and Russia. Due to the title's low minimum requirements, it was able to be played on computers with weaker processing power. The game was deemed an adventure gaming success aimed primarily at the local market, having been developed independently, almost underground. While not officially a Piposh title, In the Interest of Ratings has a link to the series; within Piposh, the main character – a flawed actor – claims to have played Egoz in the previous game.

=== Rest of the series (2000–04) ===
Roy left the series during production of the second game, believing that in addition to piracy, the distribution networks weren't as efficient at bringing video games to stores as other products like Israeli music. According to Ronan, his brother did not have prowess in the business and marketing side to succeed in the industry. After leaving, Roy moved away from sensationalist nature of the entertainment and gaming industry, and instead focused in personal creative projects. On his own Ronan began to suffer financially, which would continue for years while making the Piposh games. By 2003 he was living on 30 shekels a day. He would later explain that at the time, to be a video game developer in Israel, one was expected not to make money. While the first game took 1.5 years to make, the team spent a year making Piposh 2, and a year making Halom SheItgashem. Each time the developers made a game, they did it independently and without external funding. Once a title neared completion, Guillotine spoke to their distribution company to print discs and send them to stores. However, as the distribution company was very large they didn't have time to invest into a small local game like Piposh so the games ended up being sent out two weeks later than intended, once the advertising and buzz had died down. For each title, Ronan produced advertising materials such as posters, business cards and funny stickers.

Piposh 3D was the series' first foray into 3D graphics, after using traditional animation for the previous games; this title was directed by Roy Lazarowitz. By this point the developers had grown tired of their distributor and sought to use Indogram, which represented fewer games and could therefore invest more time into each. It was developed using the A5 engine, which Guillotine had purchased specifically for this title. 2004 saw the English release of Piposh entitled Piposh Holywood, which was to be published by The Phantom after Phantom Entertainment bought the distribution rights electronically. Ynet noted that if successful, it would have been a notable achievement for the industry, seeing the first Israeli video game released on console, but noting the unclear outcome of this venture. Guillotine had aimed to translate their first Piposh game to break it into the international market, but the text and dubbing translations became an astronomical task due to the original game having a badly-constructed programming interface. The foreign adaption of the first game is known worldwide by its English title. The games were not intended to meet the technological standards of the global industry, particularly in terms of graphics. They were not targeted at a worldwide audience, instead appealing to Israeli teenagers who were not necessarily gamers, but who wanted immature content with cultural references they would understand. Haaretz contends that despite the development team tapping into the minds of local youth, the rampant pirate copying phenomenon prevented them from making a living of their games.

Piposh saw numerous opportunities for franchise expansion over its history. The team gave up a NIS 20,000 offer by Burger Ranch to distribute the games because they were vegetarians. Soon after the release of Piposh, the duo started creating a weekly comic section in the local youth newspapers Rosh 1 and Maariv LeYanar, and also created a comic book which was published by Hed Artzi, released under the title "Piposh and Other Vegetables" (פיפוש ושאר ירקות) which could be purchased from the official Guillotine site. They also lectured to youth at an animation and comics festival at the Tel Aviv Cinematheque. In 2000, the developers thought of porting Piposh to mobile phones, having already set up documents such as an installation guide, but this never came to fruition. A spin-off television series named Batheshet Moav (בטשת מואב) – ten episodes in length and about five minutes per episode – first aired on the Beep channel in either 2001 or February 5, 2002. A previous concept for the show – where viewers could interact by choosing which of two outcomes they wanted to watch – was offered to Fox Kids. While Fox wanted to sign a contract, Guillotine refused as they did not want to give up the rights and the artistic freedom, for instance they would be censored from using the swear word קיבינימט and from mentioning that Piposh's father drowned in the Yarkon River. An album featuring music, interviews, and other content entitled At the Piposh Tavern was released by Guillotine and the Tag Group in 2004. A fourth game (excluding the spin-off) was to be released but this was eventually cancelled. Running until at least 2004, 'Piposh Congresses' have been held as national meeting for all the fans of Piposh and Guillotine. The developers sold an "I'm Pipposi Proud" game package, which included 5 game discs including the first three titles, plus a demo of Piposh 3D and a disc with rare files and documents.

=== Aftermath (2005–17) ===
The last title developed by Guillotine was the network-strategy nonsense game Vajimon, which saw players fight against each other over the internet using a variety of vegetables. Around 2003–4, the company's operations were terminated and its managers retired. Renan Gluzman left the industry soon after due to the financial and mental burden the series had given him, and became a yacht skipper. He earned money as a writer of games for interactive TV and cell phone in a leading high tech company. In 2005, the brothers lectured for a Gameology course at Beit Berl College as part of the first Israeli curriculum course for video game development. The program was started by Dr. Diana Silverman Keller who discovered while writing her thesis that there was no formal education in the field of game creation in the country. She noted that "despite the success of Israeli high-tech, the Israelis do not excel at developing games". Keller contacted Renan, who at the time was known as the "spiritual father of the Israeli gaming community", and he soon became a central figure in the program.

On May 7, 2008, on Israel's 60th Independence Day, all Guillotine games were re-released free to download on the Internet. By this time, it was impossible to get the games anymore, as there were no orderly backups. The Gluzmans noted that the games were unplayable unless the player had a Windows 95 computer, and commented "I felt that I had to do this, in order to save the game from falling into the abyss". Tal Dinovich, a fan of the series who had volunteered for years on the site and answered phone calls from stuck players, helped locate all the game files and create updated versions that would work on Windows XP. The brothers noted that it was strange to revisit these games after having not touched them since the series ended in 2003. While he had since moved on from the series, Roy and Renan did create a Facebook group for the fans who had grown up with the series and wanted to reminisce. According to Calcalist, the series released 7 games, 4 of which are available for free download. As part of the campaign, the brothers aimed to print special nostalgic shirts, as this was a common fan request.

In December 2008, a group of Piposh fans, believing that it had died prematurely, started a campaign to create a new chapter of the series and started looking for volunteers. The game, to be developed through their company Sellotape (סלוטייפ) was entitled Piposh 2.5 and the Stolen Vase. The official website of the project wrote that while the developers were unable to reach the quality level of the official games, they hoped to emulate it as much as possible. Their aim was to "remember, save, and enjoy" the Piposh series. The plot, taking place immediately after Piposh 2, saw the protagonist try to find the magic 'vase of life' that can be used to resurrect characters that died in the previous game. The producer/director was Ben Werchizer, the artist/designer was Daniel Avdo, the music and dubbing producer was Itay Jeroffi, and the writer was Shahar Kraus; they were looking for professional programmers in Director or Flash as well as voice talent. Their site contained a "build your own character" minigame from the series as a flash game, and a forum dedicated to the resurrection of Piposh. The project was discontinued around 2010.

Video game archivist and founder of the Movement for Preservation of Games in Israel Raphael Ben-Ari got in touch with the series' creators and detailed the story behind its development process and in a documentary film. The documentary was uploaded to YouTube on Ben-Ari's Oldschool account. Ben-Ari believes the work boosted the Piposh community in Israel and introduced the series to many new people.

In 2015, Renard was given the "Half Life" award at the 2015 GameIS Awards due to his work on the series having a "significant impact on the short history of the Israeli gaming industry", thereby helping it to flourish.

During this time, Piposh was surrounded by a loyal fanbase who held onto the franchise even while no games were in active development. Writing a game quote in one of the Piposh Facebook groups would be met with relevant written responses and memes, and links to legally download the games. Over the years, the large community of fans who love and reminisce over the series "ran Facebook groups, organized events and constantly asked for a new game".

=== Comeback (2018–present) ===
In 2018, Piposh creators announced a reboot of the series. A new installment, simply titled Piposh, was released in April 2021.

== Critical reception ==
The games became a cult hit in Israel, known for their unique humor, original characters and a satirical look at Israeli society. The Gluzmans are notable for being one of a few Israelis who have managed to develop a computer game within the country and distribute it in Israel. According to Timeout, the games are hilarious and brave. Eser felt that Piposh was a "semi-decent adventure game". Bikorate felt the title had a "fascinating plot and humor ahead of its time". The student newsletter Factor thought the game was "more funny, more ingenious, and generally more universal" than In the Interest of Ratings had been a year earlier, and felt the two games were "exemplary examples of Israeli creativity". Sport5 listed the game in their article There is honor: the greatest Israeli computer games ever, rating it 10/10 and praising its unique crazy and sharp sense of creativity and humour, as well as for sparking one of the "most cohesive computer game communities ever in the country".

Haaretz deemed it ultimately a failed initiative to establish the Israeli video gaming industry, despite its significance. Vgames deemed the series "the most daring attempt to create computer games for Israeli audiences only". In 2001, Ynet asserted that the few games of Israeli origin such as Piposh were "quite negligible in terms of scope and technicality", and were "not close to being competitive in the global market", but in 2003 the site saw the series as a source of Israeli pride. The site would later come to feel that the series offered some of the most "bizarre, funny and hallucinatory quests" to come out of gaming, noting that the first title is widely regarded as a cult game, and that many peculiar moments from the series are etched into the minds of players. Bikorate thought Piposh 2 surprised with its "witty and satirical jokes about Israeli society".

The Hebrew site Eser, despite having sympathy for Israeli game developers, who are "forced to work in almost impossible conditions" when compared to their American and European colleagues, gave Piposh 3D a scathing review; while calling its premise amusing, and noting that the patient Piposh fanbase would overlook its inferior graphics the site felt the game was very bad, likening it to a "singer singing without makeup". Ynet criticised 3D's graphics and interface, though noted its humour and charm might make up for the experience. Ben-Ari feels a sense of patriotism toward the game as a piece of video gaming software that is proudly and unabashedly Israeli. Factor thought the series attempt to enter the 3D market was an "utter failure". Even though Walla thought Piposh 3D was a bad game, it thought the game looked like a masterpiece in comparison with Dangerous Vaults, a Lara Croft parody that forces players to have sex with animals.

When news of a fan-made Piposh 2.5 was brought to Nana 10, the site made an emotional appeal to its readers, hoping to attract anyone who could "help this promising project take shape", while hoping it would be the first of many. Meanwhile, 2all.co.il wished the developers success.

Noting a recent campaign to name a road in Israel "Lara Croft street", Nana 10 hoped that soon there would be a "Piposh street" to honour the series. The paper believed Piposh to be possibly the most successful and profitable Israeli computer gaming project, deeming Guillotine a champion of the local industry. Makorrishon deemed Guillotine a "stubborn pioneer" due to persisting with making a game in Israel, though noted that despite their bravery, the company did close down a mere 6 years later. Looking back at the games in 2008, the brothers were impressed at how the humour held up, and noted ultimately that Piposh is "not a game of technology, but of people, behavior and relationships". Comedy Children listed the original title as the only Israeli entry in an article entitled "The Most Funny Games".

According to Gadgety, the games have "earned cult status among Israeli players". Calcalist deemed it "most important series of games - well, the only one - that was done in Israel in this millennium". Additionally, it argued that the series' humor combined the nonsense of LucasArts and Sierra with the experimental weirdness of Channel 2. Renard and Roy have said that "what Piposh is good at is being crazy, being delusional and telling a good story with an emphasis on humor and Israeliness".

In January 2026, Piposh was voted the best Israeli indie game of all time at the annual YB Awards, run by a prominent Israeli gaming YouTuber and supported by gaming businesses and the gaming community, beating other franchises from past and present.
