= Aaargh! =

1987 video game

- Cover Art
- Developers: Binary Design; Sculptured Software
- Publishers: Arcadia Systems; Melbourne House
- Designers: Steve Coleman; Joe Hitchens
- Artist: Joe Hitchens
- Platforms: Arcade, Amiga, Amstrad CPC, Apple IIgs, Atari ST, Commodore 64, MS-DOS, MSX, ZX Spectrum
- Release: 1987, 1988, 1989
- Genre: Action game
- Mode: Single-player

Aaargh! is a single-player action video game in which the player controls a giant monster with the goal of obtaining eggs by destroying buildings in different cities across a lost island. It was designed for Mastertronic's Arcadia Systems, an arcade machine based on the custom hardware of the Amiga, and was released in 1987. It was ported to a range of other platforms and released on these across 1988 and 1989. Electronic Arts distributed the Amiga version of the game.

== Gameplay ==
Taking the role of a monster, the player must destroy buildings in search of eggs.

The goal of the game is to find the golden dragon's egg. The player controls one of two monsters who must destroy buildings in order to find Roc eggs, the discovery of each of which triggers a fight with a rival monster. When five eggs are found, the two monsters fight on a volcano to claim the dragon's egg.

The game is an action game with fighting game elements. The player chooses to play as either a Dinosaur (Note: The monster is described as a Dinosaur on the box but the manual describes it as a Dragon being 18 feet tall) or an Ogre (Note: The monster is depicted as a Cyclops and is described as being 20 feet tall in the manual); the character that the player does not select becomes the player's rival to obtain the egg. After an egg is located, the player must fight the rival monster in a one on one battle to lay claim to the egg. In the arcade version of the game either one or two players could play simultaneously, whereas on the ports only one player could play at a time.

Gameplay takes place across the ten cities of the Lost Island (Note: The manual refers to the island as Darance, while ingame text refers to it as Forgotten Island), these include a Primitive village, a Pueblo village, a Wild West Fort, a Chinese Pagoda village, an ancient Egyptian city, a Colonial harbour town, a Medieval village, an Aztec city, an Ancient Greece city, and an Indian Temple city. The island's giant Volcano is the final level of the game. Each city is represented by a single static playing area that uses a form of 2.5D projection in order to give the impression of depth on the screen. The monsters can eat the natives or various giant food items (Pizza slice, Hamburger, Hot Dog, Taco) for health as well as a lightning bolt for a powerup. These items are hidden in the level's buildings.

As well, the monsters will be attacked by the native's weapons (catapults, cannons, and wagons), and various monsters that inhabit the island (Giant mosquitoes, giant bees, giant hornets, Rocs, giant flying lizards, and dragons).

== Reception ==
Reception

Review scores
Publication	Score
ACE	261/1000 (Amiga)
Amiga Computing	67% (Amiga)
Crash	29% (Spectrum)
Computer and Video Games	8/10 (Amiga)
Dragon	X (Amiga)
Sinclair User	44% (Spectrum)
Your Sinclair	48% (Spectrum)
Zzap!64	87% (Amiga)

The game received mixed reviews from gaming magazines across the platforms to which it was ported, with scores ranging from around 2/10 (or equivalent) up to almost 9/10.

While reviewers praised the graphics and sound, particularly on the Amiga port, they criticised the gameplay. ACE magazine said that although the game had "good graphics, atmospheric sound and good gameplay" there was not enough challenge to the game and that players would "not want to spend much time playing a game you know you can beat easily." ZX Spectrum reviewers were unimpressed by the fact that the game required levels to be loaded individually, with Your Sinclair magazine describing it as a "multi-level, multi-load, beat 'em, blowtorch 'em up which'll have you screaming its title each time you die and have to reload."

The game was reviewed in 1989 in Dragon #141 by Patricia Hartley and Kirk Lesser in "The Role of Computers" column. The reviewers normally assign a rating to a game ranging from 1 up to 5 stars, but they disliked this game so much that they ranked it with an "X" instead, stating: "This game is boring, violent without purpose, and lacks a solid plot".

== See also ==
- Crush, Crumble and Chomp! (1981)
- Rampage (1986)
- The Movie Monster Game (1986)
