= Dragonriders of Pern (video game) =

1983 video game

- Developer: The Connelley Group
- Publisher: Epyx
- Designer: Jim Connelley
- Series: Dragonriders of Pern
- Platforms: Atari 8-bit, Commodore 64
- Release: 1983
- Genre: Strategy
- Modes: Single-player, multiplayer

Dragonriders of Pern is a video game published by Epyx in 1983 based on Anne McCaffrey's book series of the same name. The game was released for the Atari 8-bit computers and Commodore 64.

The player acts as the ruler of a "weyr", a mountaintop redoubt where the people of the planet Pern raise dragons in order to protect against periodic invasions of deadly "thread" that falls from a nearby planet. The game is primarily a strategic one, in which the user attempts to form alliances, but it also includes an action portion where the player controls a dragon in an attempt to destroy falling thread.

The game was considered a forerunner of similar games based on novels. A sequel for the Commodore 64, Moreta: Dragonlady of Pern, was cancelled.

== Plot ==
In the novels, the world of Pern is in a semi-feudal state of development. The majority of the population belongs to one of many Holds, which are similar to principalities or duchies.

Pern is at the mercy of the Thread, a deadly microorganism native to another planet in the Pern solar system. When the two planets periodically approach each other in orbit every few hundred years, the organisms form into long strings of thread that cross the gap through space.

The Weyrs are dedicated to the raising and training of dragons, whose fiery breath is the only effective weapon against the Thread. Only the combined forces of many Weyrs could hope to deal with the Thread on a global basis, but internecine political battles among the Holds, Weyrs, and powerful Guilds prevent any sort of global response.

The first book, Dragonflight, is primarily focused on the efforts of Benden Weyr's new dragon master to form an alliance to fight the soon-to-arrive Thread. It has been hundreds of years since the last approach of the two planets, and the planet is ill-prepared for its return.

== Gameplay ==
A thread fight. The dragon is in the upper right corner of the screen in the frontmost of three "depths". Thread is falling on two of these depths; the larger Threads (like those lower on the screen) at the front, and smaller Threads (examples at the top) in the middle depth.

Like the books, Dragonriders focuses on the strategic need to form alliances between the Holds, Weyrs, and Guilds. It also had the option of periodic action sequences in which the player has to fight the Thread directly.

The game is divided into turns, each representing one 240-day year. The player can select any game length from 1 to 99 turns when the game is being set up. Game setup also allows the player to select the speed of the game which affects how long messages are displayed. Gameplay can stretch into hours, depending on the number of turns selected. The player is offered a chance to save the game to disk at the end of every turn. The game could also be played by one to four players on the Atari, and one or two players on the C64, each using separate joysticks. The Commodore 64 could have up to 4 players if the paddle and keyboard were used.

During each turn, the user is initially presented with a screen showing ongoing negotiations between the various factions in the game, as the date continues to increase in real time. At any time, the player can decide to start negotiations of his own, which may be the formation of an alliance, or a more mundane attempt to influence future negotiations through invitations to a wedding or hatching. Watching the ongoing negotiations between the computer-controlled Holds is important, as it often provides clues to the next Holds to contact.

While negotiations are taking place, a map of Pern periodically appears, highlighting a Hold where Thread is falling. Any of the Weyrs can choose to send dragons to fight the Thread, and how many to send. The outcome of these battles has a major influence on the Weyr's perception among the Holds, so sending dragons to allies, or potential allies, has a major outcome during the next turn. When the turn ends, thread is fought.

If the player has chosen to send dragons to a Hold, this launches an action sequence, with the player controlling one of the Dragonriders, maneuvering the dragon and firing its breath to destroy the Thread falling from the top of the screen. Thread that touches the dragon injures and eventually kills it, and the player attempts to survive to the end of the sequence with the number of dragons he decided to send.

One twist to the action sequence was the inclusion of a 3-D capability known as "depths". Each "depth" was a separate 2-D side-view play field on which the Thread was falling, stacked onscreen, and indicated by scaling the size of the Thread and dragon. Selecting one depth produced a simple 2-D playfield, but this could be increased up to three, allowing the user to move "into" the screen among the layers. Adding layers made the gameplay more complex, but spread the Thread across the layers, and thereby provided more room to maneuver.

The game is score-based, with points being awarded for successful negotiations and alliances. Games end when the pre-selected number of turns expire, a certain number of points are reached, or a certain number of Holds become Thread-infested.

== Development ==
Dragonriders was developed during a key period of the development of Epyx, what amounted to a "battle for the creative vision of Epyx".

Originally formed as Automated Simulations in 1978 as a partnership between Jim Connelley and Jon Freeman, the company had initially concentrated on wargame titles like Starfleet Orion. The release of the famed Temple of Apshai in 1979 took the company away from its hardcore market into a more action-oriented space. Concerned about brand dilution, the company introduced the Epyx brand to cover these titles. As these were very successful, the Epyx brand became more widely used than its parent company's name.

By 1982 the company had grown very large and Freeman left to work on his own (forming Free Fall Associates). Although Connelley was ostensibly in control of the company, in effect he had removed himself from the day-to-day operations to focus on development. This led to the formation of an internal development team under his direction, known as "The Connelley Group". During this period, the company continued moving its focus from simulations and wargames to action titles. By 1983 the company's management was focusing on the Epyx brand, and changed the name of the company to match.

Dragonriders was one of the last games designed to the original vision of the thinking man's game company. Although Dragonriders garnered critical praise, its release was overshadowed by the pure-action game Jumpman, a huge success. Connelley left with his team soon after, and this was his last game at Epyx.

A board game based on the same basic premise was also released in 1983 by Mayfair Games. Like the Epyx game, the board game concentrated on the diplomatic efforts of one to seven players, with the same basic victory conditions. Unlike the Epyx version, there was no action sequence. The parallels between the gameplay dynamics of the two games are striking, but existing sources do not record whether or not this was due to a collaborative effort.

== Reception ==
Pern received mixed reviews when it arrived. Compute! granted it a lengthy review, calling it "offbeat" and suggesting it to players looking for something different than "shooting up the same retreaded space ships" or typing "look under rock". Computer Gaming World was even more hesitant, suggesting that those looking for action would be better off elsewhere, while those looking for complex strategy would find the game would "appeal to you". In a 1992 survey of science fiction games the magazine gave the title two stars out of five, stating that "it offers some interesting features, but it is dated and primitive" and mentioning DragonStrike as a superior clone. Creative Computing in 1984 said Pern "cleverly mixes elements of Diplomacy-style wargaming, arcade skills, and fantasy roleplaying". While noting the need for time to learn the gameplay, the magazine concluded that "it will be worth the trouble to escape to Anne McCaffrey's fantasy world".
