= Street Sports Soccer =

1988 video game

- Developer: K-byte
- Publisher: Epyx
- Platforms: Commodore 64, MS-DOS, Apple IIGS, Apple II
- Release: 1988
- Genre: Sports
- Modes: Single-player, multiplayer

Street Sports Soccer is a 1988 sports video game developed by K-byte and published by Epyx for the Commodore 64, Apple II, Apple IIGS, and MS-DOS-compatible operating systems. It was the third title in the Street Sports series by the publisher, following Street Sports Baseball and Street Sports Basketball. The game received mixed reviews. In 2024, it was included in the Evercade C64 Collection 3 by Blaze Entertainment.

== Gameplay ==
Gameplay screenshot of the Apple IIgs version.

Player compete in street competitions of soccer in teams of three, either against a computer, or with another player if two joysticks are connected. Players select from five pairs of teams, each with two forwards and a goalie, with a coin toss made to determine who picks the first player on their team. Matches are set between two and 45 minutes. Players use the joystick to control the highlighted player with the ball, and use buttons to shoot, or dive the goalie towards the ball. The game features offside rules.

== Reception ==
Reception

Review scores
| Publication | Score | |
| Publication | C64 | PC |
|---|---|---|
| ACE | | 33.2% |
| Commodore User | 5/10 | |
| The Games Machine (UK) | 63% | 42% |
| Zzap!64 | 75% | |

Compute! considered the game was good and enjoyable for soccer fans, praising the inclusion of official rules and tactics to maintain interest, although struggled to distinguish players from competitors. Zzap! also found the game enjoyable, but felt it was not a proper simulation of soccer, which meant that whilst players did not need any special knowledge or skills to play, the game had a "lack of tactical variety". Commodore User felt the game "plays sluggishly and the sprites are too slow and clunky to give the game any real action feeling", also critiquing the "appalingly bad" scrolling screen for not following the ball or players.
