= Fore =

Fore may refer to:

- Fore people, a highland people of Papua New Guinea
- Fore (golf), a warning yelled by golfers
- Fore Abbey, a 6th century abbey in Ireland
- Fore River (Maine), a river
- Fore!, the 4th album by Huey Lewis and the News
- Fore! (Entourage), an episode of the TV series Entourage
- Fore! (video game), a 1982 video game
- Fore (EP), an EP by Pegboy
- Toward the front of a ship (see List of ship directions)
- FORE Systems, a computer networking company

== Places in Ireland ==
- Fore, County Westmeath, a village beside Fore Abbey
- Fore (barony, County Meath); see List of baronies of Ireland
- Fore (barony, County Westmeath)
- Fore (Parliament of Ireland constituency) (1612–1800), County Westmeath

== See also ==
- Aft
