= Breakdance (disambiguation) =

Breakdance is a style of street dance.

Breakdance may also refer to:

- "Breakdance" (song), a 1984 song by Irene Cara
- Break Dance, a 1984 Commodore 64 game
- Breakdance (ride), a type of amusement park and fairground ride
- Breakin', a 1984 hip-hop dance-themed film released as Breakdance in the United Kingdom
- "Break Dance - Electric Boogie", a 1983 song by West Street Mob
- "Break Dance Party", a 1984 song by Break Machine
