= Jumpman Junior =

1983 video game

- Developer: Epyx
- Publisher: Epyx
- Designer: Randy Glover
- Platforms: Atari 8-bit, ColecoVision, Commodore 64
- Release: 1983: Atari 8-bit, C64; 1984: ColecoVision
- Genre: Platform
- Mode: Single-player

Jumpman Junior is a platform game written by Randy Glover and published by Epyx in 1983 for the Atari 8-bit computers and Commodore 64. In 1984, a port was released for ColecoVision in Australia, France, Germany, Italy and the UK. It is a follow-up to Jumpman (1983). While Jumpman has 30 levels, Jumpman Junior has 12–all of which are different from the previous game. The game was reduced in scope so it could be released in cartridge form.

== Gameplay ==
Gameplay screenshot (Atari 8-bit)

Jumpman Junior has the same gameplay as Jumpman but with new levels. The goal is to disarm the bombs before they explode. To reach the bombs the player must navigate up platforms, ladders, and ropes by jumping and climbing. Each level has a different theme and different obstacles. There are 12 levels and 8 game speeds.

== Reception ==
Antic liked Jumpman Junior's "excellent" graphics, and faulted it only for the way it started over from the beginning after losing a life. Electronic Games started its review by calling the original Jumpman "a genuine classic" with levels that were "a coherently-written collection of some of the most interesting play mechanics ever devised." They conclude that the new version is "so good—the playfields are reminiscent of the original, but are all new—that even veteran Jumpmen should check it out." InfoWorld's Essential Guide to Atari Computers cited Jumpman Junior as a standout among Epyx's arcade games. Creative Computing said that it was not among the "look-alikes that don't add anything to the [climbing game] genre", approving of the gameplay and attract mode.

Computer and Video Games rated the ColecoVision version 89% in 1989.

== Legacy ==
In 2004, Jumpman Junior was re-released on the C64 Direct-to-TV.
