= John Bigelow (disambiguation) =

John Bigelow (1817–1911) was an American diplomat.

John Bigelow may also refer to:

- John P. Bigelow (1797–1872), American politician
- John Bigelow, Jr. (1854–1936), American cavalry officer and son of American diplomat John Bigelow
- John Bigelow IV (born 2001), American golfer
- Jackie Cooper (1922–2011), child actor brought up as John Bigelow
