= 4x4 Off-Road Racing =

1988 video game

- Developer: Ogdan Micro Design
- Publishers: NA: Epyx; EU: U.S. Gold
- Platforms: Commodore 64, MS-DOS, Amstrad CPC, ZX Spectrum, Atari ST, Amiga, MSX
- Release: 1988
- Genre: Racing
- Mode: Single Player

4x4 Off-Road Racing is a video game of the racing genre released in 1988 by Epyx and developed by Ogdan Micro Design.

== Gameplay ==
ZX Spectrum screenshot

The player chooses one of four race areas that are set in different environments (Mud, Ice, Desert and Mountains) and selects a car which will be used to race on them with other 17 competitors. Each car is a 4x4 vehicle with its own unique characteristics like weight, top speed, fuel tank capacity. Selected car can be upgraded before the race with different set of tyres, set of tools required to fix the car in case of malfunction (or mechanic who does not require tools but increases weight), additional fuel tank. A vehicle can albo be re-modeled in order to add space so more tools can be loaded but it will increase weight thus the speed will be decreased and the fuel usage increased.

During the race the player has to avoid obstacles that are on the way - each collision brings down the endurance level. Some of the obstacles, however, may be useful in jumping over rivers. Each map is divided into three section and between them there are checkpoints were cars can be repaired or refueled without using tools loaded on them.

== Reception ==
Compute! called the game "an enjoyable drive".

The Spanish magazine Microhobby valued the game with the following scores: Originality: 50% Graphics: 50% Motion: 60% Sound: 50% Difficulty: 70% Addiction: 40%
