= Super Cycle =

1986 video game

- Developer: Epyx
- Publisher: Epyx
- Platforms: Amstrad CPC, Atari ST, Commodore 64, ZX Spectrum
- Release: 1986

Super Cycle is a 1986 racing video game developed and published by Epyx. Originally released for the Commodore 64, Amstrad CPC, ZX Spectrum and Atari ST, it is a clone of Sega's 1985 arcade racing game Hang-On.

The Commodore 64 version was later re-released in 2023 as part of THEC64 Collection 3 compilation cartridge for the Evercade by Blaze Entertainment.

== Gameplay ==
Super Cycle is a racing game in which arcade style racing is featured.

== Reception ==
Reception

Award
| Publication | Award |
|---|---|
| Computer and Video Games | C+VG Hit |

David M. Wilson and Johnny L. Wilson reviewed the game for Computer Gaming World, and called it a "pleasing translation of the coin-op motorcycle racing hit".
