= Fax (video game) =

1983 video game

- Developer: Exidy
- Publishers: Exidy (arcade); Epyx
- Designers: Mike Craven; Vic Tolomei
- Writer: Larry W. Hutcherson
- Platforms: Arcade, Commodore 64, Apple II
- Release: June 1983
- Genre: Quiz
- Modes: Single player, multiplayer

Fax (a play on facts) is a quiz game developed by Exidy and released as an arcade video game in June 1983. The wooden arcade cabinet stands about 4 feet high and looks nothing like other video games of the time period. Home versions were published by Epyx for the Commodore 64 and Apple II.

== Gameplay ==
Fax is a trivia game which the players are asked multiple-choice questions that cover about four topics whose are general knowledge, sports, history and entertainment. The game had more than 4,800 questions and three skill levels which are novice, expert and genius.

During the players take the time to answer, two timers are shown. The timer at the top of the screen is shown as a bar, indicating the total time of the current question. The timer at the bottom of the screen consists of four digits and indicates the score the players get when they answer a question correctly. When the timer reaches zero in single-player mode, the player receives no score and the game moves on to the next question. In the two-player mode, the winner is displayed before the option to play again is presented.

== Reception ==
Reception

Review scores
Publication	Score
Software Encyclopedia	8
Glitchwave	1.50/5.0

In a group test of 11 trivia games, John O'Brien from Commodore Power/Play said "Fax isn't the best of them, but a good addition to the trivia buff's collection."
