= Boulder Dash Construction Kit =

1986 video game

- Developer: First Star Software
- Publishers: Epyx; Databyte
- Platforms: Commodore 64, Atari 8-bit, Amiga, Amstrad CPC, Apple II, Atari ST, MS-DOS, ZX Spectrum
- Release: 1986: C64, Atari 8-bit 1987: Apple II, ST, MS-DOS; 1988: Amstrad, Spectrum; 1989: Amiga

Boulder Dash Construction Kit is the fourth game in the Boulder Dash series. It was published for the Commodore 64 and Atari 8-bit computers in 1986 by Epyx. Ports were released for the Apple II, Atari ST, Amiga, Amstrad CPC, ZX Spectrum, and MS-DOS. The Spectrum version was rereleased as Boulder Dash IV: The Game. Boulder Dash Construction Kit includes new levels and a level editor.

== Reception ==
Reception

Review score
Publication	Score
Zzap!64	97%

Rick Teverbaugh reviewed the Atari ST version of the game for Antic and said: "I'd mostly recommend it for Boulder Dash fanatics who know the game inside and out and want new horizons and challenges. They certainly can be created here".

Steve Panak reviewed the Atari 8-bit version of the game for Antic and wrote: "Of course, one expects all the hallmarks of a proven arcade wristbuster. The simple objectives, fast action and superb graphics make for hours of addictive play".

Rhett Anderson for Compute! said that "players unfamiliar with Boulderdash probably won't stand much of a chance; experts will be delighted. Beginners are better off designing their own games with easier challenges before trying to tackle the sample game".

David Langendoen for Family Computing considered the game as "boulder" and "better" than its predecessors.

Ervin Bobo for Compute!'s Gazette said that the action in the game is fast and deadly.
