= Quedex =

1987 video game

- Developer: Thalamus
- Publishers: Thalamus; Epyx
- Designer: Stavros Fasoulas
- Composer: Matt Gray
- Platforms: Amiga, Commodore 64, MS-DOS, TRS-80 Color Computer
- Release: 1987: C64; 1988: Amiga, MS-DOS; 1989: TRS-80 Color Computer
- Mode: Single-player

Quedex is a game released for the Commodore 64 in 1987 by Thalamus. It is the third game developed by Finnish game programmer Stavros Fasoulas. The game consists of ten planes where the player steers a silvery ball and must find an exit square in order to leave the maze-like play-area. The name Quedex derives from the subtitle "The Quest for Ultimate Dexterity". In 1988, Epyx released ports of Quedex for the Amiga and MS-DOS under the name Mindroll.

== Gameplay ==
The ten levels can be played in any order the player chooses. The game contains features and challenges such as jumping, going through teleports and finding keys that open gates. Only Planes 4 and 8 feature music, due to their more frenetic nature.

1. Introductory level, teaching the player the mechanics of gameplay. The players roll over flashing squares to reveal a hole to the next sub-plane. It also introduces time-draining electric pools and lifts.
2. Players traverse a maze of teleports and doors, which are unlocked by picking up keys. Touching the skull tiles is fatal.
3. This level features teleports and electric tiles abound, and a sub-maze of invisible walls that reveal a pickup when players bump into them.
4. The players race down an obstacle course; bumping into obstacles knocks time off the clock, as does jumping from a lift or into an electric pool. Jumps are limited to 4.
5. The players turn all the tiles textured by rolling over them. Flashing tiles affect several others; black tiles are safe spaces rather than holes. Jumps are limited to 9.
6. This level requires players to navigate a maze of pipes, avoiding electric and skull tiles. Question mark icons litter the plane, some of which reveal the goal, but some are invisible until they are within range. Jumps are limited to what they can pick up.
7. The players have to pick up as many time pickups as they can, but the plane is covered with Goal tiles. They can collect all the pickups to reveal a bonus sub-plane with another 27, greatly enhancing a timer.
8. The players have to work their way to the centre of a maze, collecting four keys to unlock the goal as they go. No time to waste, because the maze collapses around the player. The route to the goal differs depending on the colour of the plane.
9. The goal is to destroy all the blocks and this can only be done by grabbing a cross pickup that turns the sphere blue and running into the blocks at high speed. Non-path tiles only drain player's clock while flashing.
10. The players hop across small islets of tiles, the height of which differs depending on how light or dark they are. The level also features the game's only use of conveyor belts.

Completing a plane takes to a brief bonus plane, in which a set sequence of directions had to be repeated.

== Ports ==
Quedex was released in America by Epyx under the name Mindroll on the Amiga and MS-DOS in 1988, and on the TRS-80 Color Computer in 1989. Silent Software was behind the conversion. The game also bore Thalamus copyrights. The look and feel of Mindroll was more bizarre and arcane in nature, with the sphere becoming an eyeball or 8-ball and the plane walls being ornately decorated. While the graphics were more colourful, the frame rate dropped greatly on both formats.

== Reception ==
The game was positively reviewed by Zzap!64 who described it as "an original, beautifully designed and superbly implemented puzzle package". It was given an overall score of 92%, earning the magazine's Sizzler accolade. Commodore User were also impressed by the game, praising the "superb" graphics and sound and stating that it was "a strange game but a great game". It was awarded a 9/10 overall rating.
