= Armor Assault =

1982 video game

- Publisher(s): Automated Simulations
- Designer(s): John Weber
- Platform(s): Atari 8-bit
- Release: 1982
- Genre(s): Turn-based strategy

Armor Assault is a turn-based strategy video game written by John Weber for the Atari 8-bit computers and published in 1982 by Automated Simulations. It is a game in which tactical level armor warfare is simulated between NATO and Soviet forces.

== Gameplay ==
In-game screenshot showing river map

Armor Assault is a tactical simulation of tank warfare in hypothetical World War III between NATO and the Soviet Union, in a variety of scenarios from the Rhine to Afghanistan. Each side controls six tanks, armed with guided missiles and mines. The player can select from 12 scenarios and variety of terrain: jungle, desert, river, city and mountain ranges. Each turn player maneuvers his tanks, mines and guided missiles, destroying his foe's forces with opportunity and direct fire. Movement is affected by terrain and type of fire implemented.

== Reception ==
Floyd Mathews reviewed the game for Computer Gaming World, and stated that "All factors considered, Armor Assault is a game with many good features, the best of which are the ability gives of during a wide range of scenarios and the inclusion of simultaneous movement and opportunity fire."
