= Invasion Orion =

1979 video game

- Developer: Automated Simulations
- Publisher: Automated Simulations
- Designers: Jon Freeman; Jim Connelley
- Platforms: Apple II, Atari 8-bit, PET, TRS-80
- Release: 1979
- Genre: Strategy
- Modes: Single-player, multiplayer

Invasion Orion is a 1979 science fiction strategy video game written and published by Automated Simulations (which would become Epyx in 1983). It is one or two player sequel to the original two-player Starfleet Orion which was published in late 1978. The game was written in BASIC for the Commodore PET and TRS-80 and ported to the Atari 8-bit computers and Apple II.

== Gameplay ==
The gamefield was a thirty-two high by sixty-four wide grid of possible locations (the game manual contains a typo, stating these are 34 × 62). The map could contain ships, stacked on the same grid space if needed, as well as planets and other objects. The game was turn based, and in two-player games the players took turns at the keyboard to enter their commands, which were then carried out simultaneously. Each player controlled one or more ships, and the game continued until one or both were destroyed, or escaped by flying off the playfield.

Ships were powered by a single energy source whose power had to be divided up among the many parts of the ship, including drives, shields and weapons. Each ship was armed with a beam weapon whose chance to hit a target depending on the target's size and the "beam quality" of the firing ship. The amount of damage caused by a hit was reduced with distance, making it primarily a short-range weapon. In addition, ships were also armed with missiles or torpedoes for long-range fire. Missiles would fly to a location in space relative to the ship after movement and then explode regardless if there was a target in that location. Torpedoes were fired in a particular direction (the eight cardinals) and would explode if they passed within two grid spaces of any other material object (everything except torpedoes). Some ships also included fighters equipped with missiles or torpedoes, which allowed spoiling attacks. Generally the Klaatu ships were better armed and shielded, but lacked armor.

Additionally, ships were equipped with a tractor beam that allowed them to push or pull on material objects, allowing complicated strategies of pushing or pulling on opposing ships to throw off their aim. For instance, a torpedo aimed at a ship that was expected to be "due left" after the movement phase could be avoided by the target by pushing the opposing ship a few locations down. The distance a ship could be pushed or pulled was a relative measure of the strength of the beam and the mass of the target. For instance, it was a useful strategy to use the tractor beam to push fighters quickly into range of their targets, at "speeds" their own engines could not achieve. One change between Invasion and Starfleet is that the tractor beam could no longer be used on opposing missiles.

The mission setups were provided in the manual. For the cassette versions they had to be typed in using the BUILDER program and saved to a second cassette (not supplied) so they could be loaded in again after loading the game. The diskette version had all of the ten pre-rolled missions on the disk, allowing them to be easily loaded up. The user could still create their own missions using BUILDER, as well. One new addition was the in-game "W" command, which would write out a copy of the current game state in a BUILDER-file format, allowing it to be re-loaded later.

Unlike Starfleet, Invasion's game manual does not include the source code.

== Development ==
After Starfleet Orion had been completed, the authors, Jon Freeman and Jim Connelly, decided that the original placed too many demands on the players. In the case of the cassette versions, for instance, the player would first have to type in a series of complex inputs to the BUILDER program and save them to a separate cassette, then load up the game and use it to load in the scenario that had been saved to the other cassette. Additionally, the game demanded two players who had to take turns typing in their commands on the keyboard, hopefully not peeking to see what the other user was entering. Finding two players willing to play a longish strategy game was always difficult – the final pre-rolled mission had a suggested playing time of six hours.

Both Freeman and Connelly were interested in a new game with what they called "solo play", a single player against a computer opponent. Given the limited resources of the Commodore PET the game was written on, any sort of strategy on the computer's part would have to be simple. In order to make up for this and have some sort of challenge, they made the scenarios somewhat one sided, allowing the computer AI to simply charge in and attack with some hope of winning.

== Reception ==
Todd Zervas reviewed Invasion Orion in The Space Gamer No. 32. Zervas commented that "Invasion Orion is great for the solo games. If you have live opponents available, then leave this one on the shelf and buy Starfleet Orion instead."

Although he reported that the computer opponent in Invasion Orion played slowly, sometimes requiring several minutes per move, Jerry Pournelle praised the Orion games' realism: "Classical principles of fleet warfare work, and strategy and tactics are more important than luck". In March 1983 Invasion Orion won tenth place in Softline's Dog of the Year awards "for badness in computer games", Atari division, based on reader submissions.

== Reviews ==
- Moves #55, p32
