= Dragon's Eye (video game) =

1981 video game

- Developer: Southern Software
- Publisher: Automated Simulations
- Platforms: Apple II, Atari 8-bit, PET
- Release: 1981

Dragon's Eye is fantasy role-playing video game published by Automated Simulations in 1981 for the Apple II, Atari 8-bit computers, and Commodore PET.

== Plot ==
Dragon's Eye is a game in which the player is a spell-using adventurer that a wizard hires to find the legendary Dragon's Eye.

== Reception ==
Daniel Hockman reviewed the game for Computer Gaming World, and stated that "In the final analysis it is the individual combat system of Dragon's Eye that sets this game apart from others of similar type. It is very well done, challenging to play, and fun. If you like FRP style combat this is the game for you."

Rudy Kraft reviewed Dragon's Eye in The Space Gamer No. 48. Kraft recommended it, opining that it is "a very good game".
