= Jabbertalky =

1981 video game

- Publisher: Automated Simulations
- Platforms: MS-DOS, Apple II, TRS-80
- Release: 1981

Jabbertalky is a 1981 video game for MS-DOS, Apple II and TRS-80 published by Automated Simulations.

== Contents ==
Jabbertalky is programmable word game which includes three games and allows the player to create a vocabulary to use with these games.

== Reception ==
Ron Boerger reviewed Jabbertalky in The Space Gamer No. 48. Boerger commented: "Unless you are (a) crazy about word games, (b) want to buy every game for the Apple, or (c) both of the above, don't waste your money on this one."

Marty Halpern reviewed the game for Computer Gaming World, and stated that "once you understand how the game functions, it really is quite simple. By the way, I've not revealed all of the Jabbertalker's secrets... these you must discover on your own. So, while I try to find Alice, why don't you just uncurl your cramped fingers from about that joystick, forget about the aliens or hidden treasure for a little while, and enter the world of the Jabbertalker."
