= Sorcerer of Siva =

1981 video game

- Developer: Automated Simulations
- Publisher: Automated Simulations
- Series: Dunjonquest
- Platforms: Apple II, TRS-80
- Release: 1981
- Genre: Role-playing
- Mode: Single-player

Sorcerer of Siva is a 1981 video game published by Automated Simulations for the Apple II and TRS-80. The last standalone Dunjonquest game, Sorcerer of Siva is not as large as the major releases in the series, but also not as small as the MicroQuests.

== Gameplay ==
The player takes the role of a wizard, who is thrown into a labyrinth of mines by his rival. While the dungeon layout is still fixed, the players starting point within is determined at random. The combat system is different from the other titles in the series, as it is based on a set of spells instead of weapons. Fatigue is replaced with a magic aura, which determines the remaining strength to cast spells. During the game, the evil sorcerer sometimes appears to cause the player character to forget spells, which can be remembered again by finding touchstones within the mines.

== Reception ==
Bruce Webster reviewed Sorcerer of Siva in The Space Gamer No. 54. Webster commented that "If you've never played any of Epyx's adventure games, then I can easily recommend Sorcerer to you. If you've played some of the, then I can recommend this one if the theme appeals to you. If you've played most of them, you won't find anything all that new or exciting here."
