= Destroyer (video game) =

1986 video game

- Developer: Epyx
- Platforms: Amiga, Apple II, Commodore 64, IBM PC
- Release: 1986
- Genre: Simulation

Destroyer is a naval combat simulation video game published by Epyx in 1986 for the Amiga, Apple II, Commodore 64, and IBM PC compatibles.

== Gameplay ==
Destroyer puts the player in the role of captain of a Fletcher-class destroyer in the Pacific theatre during World War II. The player can undertake a number of naval warfare operations, including hunting submarines, torpedoing enemy ships, fighting off airplane attacks, bombarding island installations, rescuing stranded allies, and escorting cargo vessels through enemy waters.

The game uses both joystick and keyboard controls. The keyboard switches between several different screens, each representing a section of the ship:

- Bridge - A series of switches used to alert stations of status or turn on certain automated functions, such as pursuant or evasive action.
- Navigation - A map of the sea where the ship was, with the ability to chart specific courses.
- Observation Deck - A 360-degree view of the ocean around the ship.
- Radar - A sweeping radar screen indicating the presence of enemy planes.
- Sonar - A sonar screen indicating the presence of enemy submarines.
- Guns Forward/Guns Aft - Two separate locations on opposite ends of the ship, each with a set of long-range guns for firing on enemy ships and island locations.
- Anti-Aircraft Guns Port/Starboard - Two separate locations on opposite sides of the ship, each with a set of anti-aircraft guns for firing on enemy planes.
- Torpedoes Port/Starboard - Two separate locations on opposite sides of the ship, each with a set of torpedoes for firing on enemy ships.
- Depth Charges - A location for dropping explosive charges to attack enemy submarines.
- Damage Control - An overview of the ship to see what sections had been damaged by enemy attacks and to what extent the damage affected them.

In each screen, the joystick is used to control the functions within that screen; for example, directing the heading and speed of the ship, or aiming and firing guns. Only one screen can be controlled at any one time; however, there is an informational ticker along each screen where certain stations could report informational updates, such as if enemy planes or submarines are sighted. Each mission was played in real-time, so the choice of screen at any given time is important, and switching between them rapidly is part of the strategy.

Attacks from enemies can disable any screen at any time. If a certain area of the ship is damaged by an enemy attack, the player can still access the screen, but all or part of the functions of that screen may be unresponsive. For example, if any of the weapons are damaged, they may not fire at all, or they may still fire but may not be able to be properly aimed. Damage to the navigation area causes the ship to sail uncontrollably in random headings. As battles progress, repairs—over which the player has no control—may restore functions. Some weapons have certain limitations that if reached could cause damage as well; anti-aircraft guns, for example, can overheat if fired continuously for too long, rendering them inoperable until they cool down. If the ship was to sustain too much damage in the course of a mission (or in certain other circumstances, such as running aground on an island), the ship was deemed sunk and the mission was a failure. Players also had the option of sending an "abandon ship" message, but in terms of gameplay, the result was the same as a sunken ship.

== Reception ==
Computer Gaming World in 1987 called Destroyer "an excellent naval simulation [that] doesn't require a vast background in war games ... anyone who has ever played computer games and won at chess should have a ball". A 1991 survey of strategy and war games was less positive, however, giving it two and a half stars out of five, stating that "the documentation and scenarios are underdeveloped". A 1993 survey in the magazine of wargames gave the game two stars out of five. Compute! stated that the game successfully combined strategy and arcade elements with excellent graphics.
