= Print Magic =

- Developer: Epyx
- Initial release: 1988; 37 years ago
- Platform: Apple II, MS-DOS
- Type: personal publishing

Print Magic is a personal publishing program by Epyx. It was a direct competitor to the leading personal publishing program of the time, The Print Shop, by Broderbund. It was released in 1988 for the Apple II and MS-DOS.

Like The Print Shop, Print Magic lets users create a variety of customized documents, mixing graphics and text, such as:

- Greeting cards
- Invitations
- Award certificates
- Meeting announcements
- Publicity notices
- Scratch pads
- Stationery
- Banners

The program's three disks aren't copy-protected, so users are free to make "working copies" of them. It employs a Macintosh-like GUI, unusual for software of its time. Most commands and features are accessed via pull-down menus or icons. It can also import clip art from other publishing software, such as The Print Shop and Newsroom. It includes the ability to create custom graphics, such as with a paint program.

Print Magic's included clip art was much higher resolution than other packages and scales much better as well. It could also import fonts from Fontrix, a popular font program of the era. The flexibility of the text and graphic layout of documents was one of its most critically acclaimed features, though reviewers noted that sometimes it was troublesome due to the computer's limited resolution. However, it also has a zoom function which allows for pixel-precision placement. Print Magic includes other features, such as the ability to draw various borders on a document, something absent from other contemporary offerings.

== Reception ==
Print Magic was universally praised for its ease of use, versatility and high-quality graphics, especially compared to contemporary offerings. Duncan Teague of Compute! gave the program a favorable review saying, "Print Magic provides solutions to nearly every drawback you've encountered with other printing programs... With its ease of use, intuitive interface, exquisite graphics and text, and superior documentation, Print Magic delivers a fine performance." Peter Staek of Apple2000 said it "combines the virtues of versatility and easy operation," and, "it is a splendid alternative (or complement) to Print Shop". The only criticisms of the program were that it only allowed printing in black and white and that a fairly new ribbon should be used when printing.

== Legacy ==
Print Magic was later incorporated into another Epyx product, Studio of Greetings. Studio of Greetings used Print Magic as its engine to create a variety of greeting cards for any occasion. Released in 1992, Studio of Greetings was available only for MS-DOS.
