= John Bigelow IV =

American golfer

- Born: June 12, 2001 (age 23); Philadelphia, Pennsylvania, U.S.
- Other names: "Fore"
- Occupation: Golfer

John Bigelow IV (born June 12, 2001), also known as "Fore", is a golf prodigy from North Philadelphia. Bigelow started playing golf at the age of one when he was given a set of plastic golf clubs.

Once the media learned of his talent, requests were made for him to appear on several television shows. Fore appeared locally on the 10 Show! with host Bill Henley. He also appeared on The Ellen DeGeneres Show at the age of 3 and on The Today Show, where he was interviewed by Matt Lauer. He was featured in Golf Digest in October 2005; as a result of the article, countrymate Tiger Woods, the world's top-ranked golfer, invited him to a putting contest in New York City, New York.

He has also competed in the U.S. Kids Golf Tour for boys and girls aged four to twelve years.

He lives in central Florida where he is under the close instruction of Jered Gusso (former lead instructor at Mike Bender Academy) of The Gusso Golf Academy.
