= Monster Maze =

1982 video game

- Publisher: Epyx
- Designer: Robert Schilling
- Platforms: Atari 8-bit, VIC-20
- Release: 1982
- Genre: Maze

Monster Maze is a first-person maze video game written by Robert Schilling and published in 1982 by Epyx for the Atari 8-bit computers and VIC-20.

== Gameplay ==
Atari 8-bit screenshot

Monster Maze is a game in which the player collects gold bars in a maze while being pursued by monsters. The object is to collect as many gold bars as possible before losing all nine lives, while avoiding monsters that run around the maze. After clearing a maze, the player advances to a new, more difficult level. There are a 48 monsters scattered across the 16 levels and 48 vitamin pills that player can eat. When vitamin-charged, the player can chase a monster for a few steps and kill it.

== Reception ==
Allen Doum of Computer Gaming World wrote: "The speed of play is slow, even at the higher difficulty settings, and the monsters move more quickly while the player is moving than they do while he is standing still."
