= Crypt of the Undead =

1979 video game

- Developer: Liberty Systems
- Publisher: Automated Simulations
- Programmers: John Bell (Atari 8-bit); Steve Fisher (Apple II)
- Platforms: Atari 8-bit, Apple II
- Release: 1982
- Genres: Adventure, role-playing
- Mode: Single-player

Crypt of the Undead is an adventure game with some role-playing elements published by Automated Simulations in 1982 for the Apple II and the Atari 8-bit computers. It was sold as The Crypt in some markets.

== Description ==
The player awakes in a cemetery and must escape within 12 hours in game time, or die and become a "resident".

The game is controlled completely via a joystick. The player must collect gold (to increase power), bagels (health), and keys to escape. The cemetery is divided into four areas: Strawberry Fields, Forest Lawns, Peacock Park, and the Field of Martyrs. The areas are connected by various pathways.

Each area is inhabited by one monster: Jim the Zombie, Chet the Vampire, Marc the Werewolf, and Susan the Headless Woman. These must be defeated in order to complete the area. The areas contain various buildings, each which only can be unlocked by keys found within the game.

The game is viewed from a top-down perspective and scrolls in all four directions. The Apple II features a combination of primitive line graphics and text prose, while the Atari version uses a custom character set for its graphics.

== Development ==
This game and three others were developed for video game publisher Crystalware. Crystalware went out of business before they could be published, so Epyx picked them up and published them simultaneously. The other three games were King Arthur's Heir, The Nightmare, and Escape from Vulcan's Isle.

The Atari version was developed in Atari BASIC.

== Reception ==
Softline magazine panned the three other games, but praised this one, noting its interesting puzzles that require the players to "pay close attention to the various messages". It also praised some of its music in the boot sequence and one of its mazes. Phil Gershon of Electronic Fun with Computers & Games called it "a delightful diversion" and also said, "the graphics inside and outside the buildings are equally spectacular and the game itself shows lots of imagination and thought".

Softline noted, however, that the game re-uses one of the mazes from Vulcan's Isle and notes a technical glitch. Some copies of the game came with a write-protected tab on the floppy disk. They noted it needed to be removed in order to finish the game.

The Book of Atari Software 1983 said the graphics get repetitive after a while and that it didn't require any skill. After a while, the player learns how to beat all the opponents and it can be beat purely through persistence. They praised the instruction booklet, however. They also noted the disk write-protect error that Softline did.

Gershon noted that "the game is exactly the same each time it's played. The layout of the cemetery, the insides of buildings, the location of keys and secret clues are identical from session to session." He concluded while fun the first time, its entertainment value decreases with each playthrough.
