= The Movie Monster Game =

1986 video game

- Developer: Epyx
- Publisher: Epyx
- Platforms: Apple II, Commodore 64
- Release: NA: 1986; EU: 1986
- Genre: Action
- Mode: Single-player

The Movie Monster Game is an action video game released by Epyx for the Apple II and Commodore 64 in 1986. It includes a variety of scenarios, playable monsters, and cities to demolish (complete with famous landmarks, such as Tokyo Tower, Eiffel Tower, Statue of Liberty, Golden Gate Bridge, Saint Basil's Cathedral and Big Ben). Most of the monsters are original characters based on movie monsters such as The Blob, Mothra, Tarantula, the Stay Puft Marshmallow Man, and the Transformers. The one exception is Godzilla, which Epyx was able to officially license.

The game was re-released on Evercade part of THEC64 Collection 1.

== Gameplay ==
The player chooses one of six movie monsters to play as, a scenario, and a city for the scenario to take place. The gameplay is depicted on a movie screen in front of a movie theater crowd simulating an actual monster movie. Each scenario even starts off with an advertisement, (for popcorn and "Gummi Glogs"; in the Apple II version "Godzilla Mouthwash" is also featured), and other attractions, (such as promotions for Epyx's own Summer Games) before the "Feature Presentation" of the game begins.

=== Monsters ===
- Godzilla
- Sphectra (a giant wasp)
- The Glog (a huge green blob with red eyes)
- Tarantus (a giant Tarantula)
- Mr. Meringue (a knock-off of the Stay Puft Marshmallow Man)
- Mechatron (a giant robot that resembles Topspin from The Transformers)

=== Scenarios ===
- Berserk. The player must accumulate a certain number of points by destroying as many buildings and vehicles as possible.
- Escape. The player must flee the city before being killed by the military.
- Search. The player must use the monster to rescue its offspring hidden in a building. Godzilla's son is depicted as Minilla.
- Destroy Landmark. The player must destroy a specific landmark within the city such as the Statue of Liberty in New York City, the Tokyo Tower in Tokyo, Big Ben in London, etc.
- Lunch. The player must satisfy the monster's hunger by eating vehicles and civilians until the monster's hunger meter is depleted.

=== Cities ===
- New York City
- San Francisco
- London
- Tokyo
- Moscow
- Paris

== Reception ==
In Dragon #114's "The Role of Computers" column, reviewers Hartley and Pattie Lesser stated that "this is a game that is a great deal of fun to play!"

Computer Gaming World said that The Movie Monster Game "gets a little tedious after a while".

== See also ==
- Crush, Crumble and Chomp!
- Mail Order Monsters
