= Epyx =

Defunct video game developer and publisher

Epyx, Inc.
- Type: Private
- Industry: Video games
- Founded: 1978; 48 years ago (as Automated Simulations)
- Defunct: 1993
- Headquarters: San Francisco, California, US
- Key people: Jim Connelley; Jon Freeman; Dave Morse (software manager)
- Products: Temple of Apshai; Jumpman; Summer Games series Impossible Mission

Epyx, Inc. was an American video game developer and publisher active in the late 1970s and 1980s. The company was founded in 1978 as Automated Simulations by Jim Connelley and Jon Freeman, publishing a series of tactical combat games. The Epyx brand was introduced when the company branched out to a series of more action-oriented titles. In 1983, as these types of games now represented the majority of its product line, the company was renamed to match. Epyx published a long series of games through the 1980s. The company's assets are currently owned by Bridgestone Multimedia Group Global.

== History ==
=== Formation ===
In 1977, Susan Lee-Merrow invited Jon Freeman to join a Dungeons & Dragons game hosted by Jim Connelley and Jeff Johnson. Connelley later purchased a Commodore PET computer to help with the bookkeeping involved in being a dungeon master, and he came up with the idea of writing a computer game for the machine before the end of the year so he could write it off on his taxes. Freeman had written on gaming for several publications, and he joined Connelley in the design of a new space-themed wargame. Starting work around August 1978, Freeman wrote the basic rules, mission sets, background stories and the manual, while Connelley coded up the system in PET BASIC.

=== The BASIC era ===
The two formed Automated Simulations around Thanksgiving 1978 to market their first game, and released it in December as Starfleet Orion. Examining contemporary magazines (Byte and Creative Computing) suggests this is the first commercial space-themed wargame for a personal computer. (Note: Non-commercial space war-games existed previously, notably Star Trek and Decwar.) As the game was written in BASIC, it was easy to port to other home computers of the era, starting with the TRS-80 and then the Apple II, the latter featuring rudimentary graphics. They followed this game with 1979's Invasion Orion, which included a computer opponent so as not to require two human players.

The company's next release, Temple of Apshai, was very successful, selling over 20,000 copies. As the game was not a "simulation" of anything, the company introduced the Epyx brand name for these more action-oriented titles. Rated as the best computer game by practically every magazine of the era, Apshai was soon ported from the TRS-80 to additional systems, such as the Atari 8-bit computers and Commodore 64. Apshai spawned a number of similar adventure games based on the same game engine, including two direct sequels, branded under the Dunjonquest label. The games were so successful that they were later re-released in 1985 as the Temple of Apshai Trilogy.

Using the same BASIC game engine, a series of "semi-action" games followed under the Epyx brand, including Crush, Crumble and Chomp!, Rescue at Rigel, and Star Warrior, each of which added twists to the Apshai engine.

=== Growth and action focus ===
Freeman became increasingly frustrated by Connelley's refusal to update the game engine. He left the company to start Free Fall Associates in 1981, leaving Connelley to lead what was now a large company.

A year later, Epyx was starting to have financial difficulties. Jim Connelley wanted and received money through venture capital, and the venture capitalists installed Michael Katz to manage the company. Connelley clashed with new management, left Epyx, and formed his own development team, The Connelley Group, with all of the programmers going with him, but continued to work under the Epyx umbrella.

With no programmers to develop any games in-house, Michael Katz needed to hire programmers to ensure a steady supply of games. Several venture capital owners involved in Epyx also had ownership of a company called Starpath. While Starpath had several young programmers and hardware engineers, they were facing financial difficulties as well. Around this time, an independent submission to publish a game called Jumpman came through and was a hit for Epyx. Through the success of Jumpman revenues grew, so Michael Katz had the capital to create a merger between Epyx and Starpath, bringing Starpath's programmers and hardware engineers under the same company. Michael Katz left Epyx in 1984 after being hired away by Atari Corporation as their President of Entertainment Electronics Division (and later, became the President of Sega of America). Katz was replaced by Gilbert Freeman (no relation to Jon Freeman), hired by the board to evaluate the company's operations and budgets. Freeman had a good executive background, including guiding the initial development and launch of Pier 39 in San Francisco. By 1983 Epyx discontinued its older games because, Jerry Pournelle reported, "its managers tell me that arcade games so outsell strategic games that it just isn't cost-effective to put programmer time on strategy."

Gil Freeman made his report to the board, and they decided to keep funding the company. A turn around team was brought in: Freeman was officially hired as President, Bob Lindsey, who had been brought in from Atari, was already head of Product Development, Jon Monday, who had been VP at Romox and licensed titles from Epyx for electronic distribution to store kiosks, was brought in to deal with IT and operations. Following the company's rebrand from Automated Simulations to Epyx, Electronic Games highlighted Jumpman as a stellar example of the company's new focus on fluid, arcade-style action for home computers.

By early 1984, InfoWorld estimated that Epyx was the world's 16th-largest microcomputer-software company, with $10 million in 1983 sales. Many successful action games followed, including the hits Impossible Mission and the sports game Summer Games. The latter created a long run of successful sequels, including Summer Games II, Winter Games, California Games, and World Games. The company produced games based on licenses of Hot Wheels, G.I. Joe, and Barbie. In Europe, U.S. Gold published Epyx games for the Commodore 64, and also ported many of the games to other major European platforms such as the ZX Spectrum and Amstrad CPC. Compute!'s Gazette lauded the game's split-screen presentation and fluid animations, noting that it set a new graphical benchmark for multi-event sports simulations.

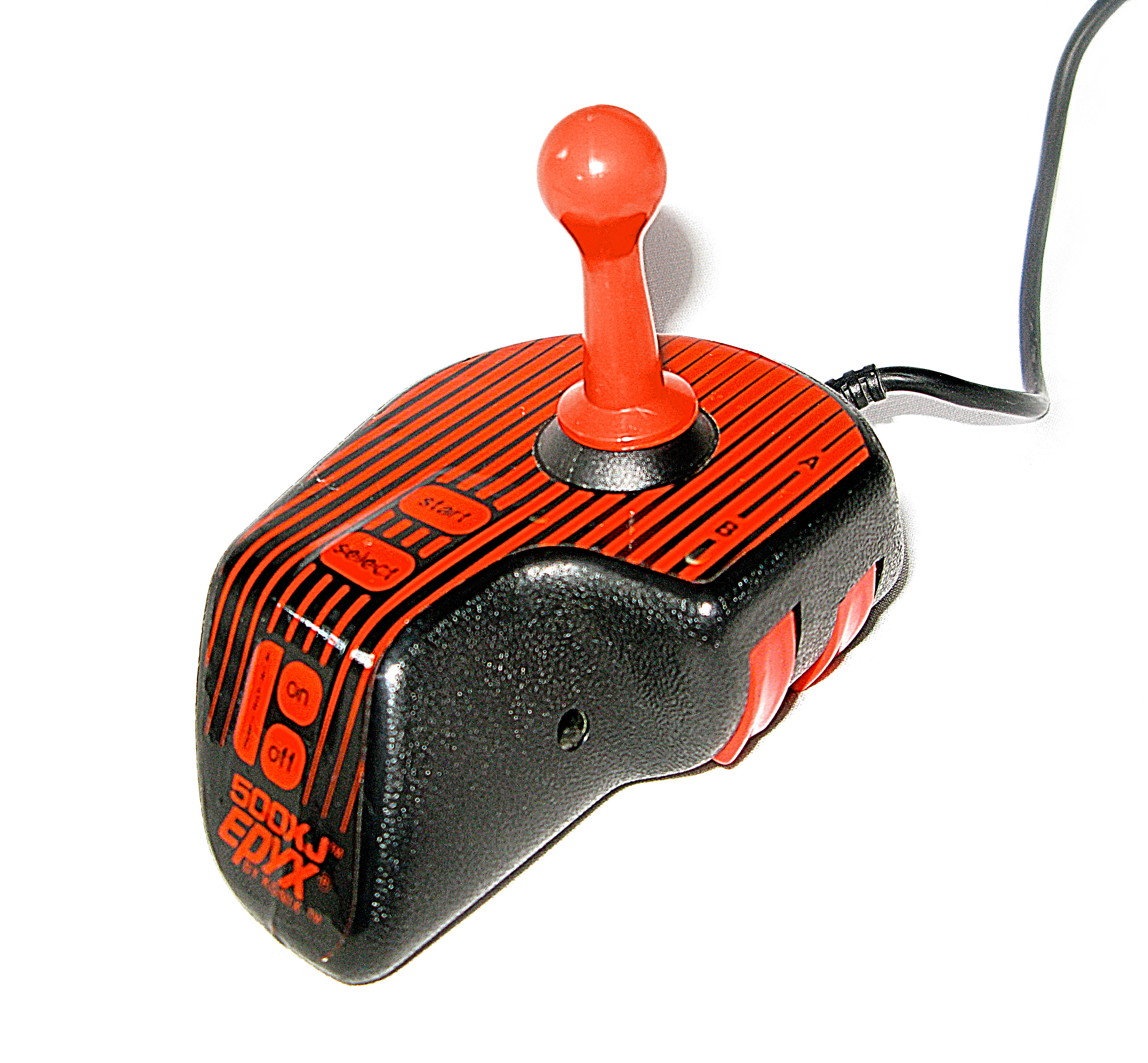
The Epyx 500XJ Atari CX40-compatible joystick

For the Commodore 64, Epyx made the Fast Load cartridge which enables a fivefold speedup of floppy disk drive accesses through Commodore's very slow serial interface. Another hardware product was the Epyx 500XJ Joystick, which uses high-quality microswitches and a more ergonomic form factor than the standard Atari CX40 joystick while remaining compatible.

Starting in 1986, Epyx realized that the Commodore 64 was starting to show its age, and it needed to think about the future of the company. They hired Dave Morse to explore the next generation of consoles and computers and to learn about their strengths. David's son wanted his father to come up with a portable game system, so he had a meeting with former colleagues at Amiga Corporation, RJ Mical and Dave Needle, to see if there was a way to design a portable gaming system. Internally, the handheld gaming system it was working on was called the Handy. Unable to continue due to high costs, it was sold to Atari Corporation which brought it to market in 1989 as the Atari Lynx.

=== Litigation ===
In 1987, Epyx faced an important copyright infringement lawsuit from Data East USA regarding Epyx's Commodore 64 video game World Karate Championship. Data East thought the whole game, and particularly the depiction of the referee, looked too much like its 1984 arcade game Karate Champ. Data East won at the US District Court level and Judge William Ingram ordered Epyx to recall all copies of World Karate Championship. Epyx appealed the case to the United States Court of Appeals for the Ninth Circuit, who reversed the judgment and ruled in favor of Epyx, stating that copyright protection did not extend to the idea of a tournament karate game, but specific artistic choices not dictated by that idea. The Court noted that a "17.5 year-old boy" could see clear differences between the elements of each game actually subject to copyright.

=== Bankruptcy and asset sales ===
Epyx was unable to fulfill its contract with Atari to finish developing Lynx hardware and software, and the latter withheld payments that the former needed. By the end of 1989, Epyx discontinued developing computer games, began making only console games, and filed for Chapter 11 bankruptcy protection. According to Stephen Landrum, a long-time game programmer at Epyx, the company went bankrupt "because it never really understood why it had been successful in the past, and then decided to branch out in a lot of directions, all of which turned out to be failures."

Epyx had shrunk from 145 employees in 1988 to fewer than 20 by the end of 1989. After emerging from bankruptcy the company resumed game development but only for the Lynx, with Atari acting as publisher. In 1993, with eight employees left, they decided just to sell off the rest of the company. Bridgestone Media Group eventually acquired the rights the rest of Epyx's assets. Job offers were extended to the eight remaining employees, but only Peter Engelbrite accepted.

In 2006, British publisher System 3 announced it had licensed certain Epyx's assets on a time limited basis to release games such as California Games and Impossible Mission for Nintendo DS, PlayStation Portable, and Wii in 2007.

== Products ==
=== Games ===
Name	Year	Platforms	Description
4x4 Off-Road Racing	1988	Amiga	An off-road racing game
4x4 Off-Road Racing	1988	Amstrad CPC	An off-road racing game
4x4 Off-Road Racing	1988	Atari ST	An off-road racing game
4x4 Off-Road Racing	1988	Commodore 64	An off-road racing game
4x4 Off-Road Racing	1988	MS-DOS	An off-road racing game
4x4 Off-Road Racing	1988	MSX	An off-road racing game
4x4 Off-Road Racing	1988	ZX Spectrum	An off-road racing game
Alien Garden	1982	Atari 8-bit	An "art game" that required experimentation to understand and win
Armor Assault	1982	Atari 8-bit	A turn-based tank strategy game between Soviet and NATO forces
Barbarian: The Ultimate Warrior	1987	Acorn Electron	Also known as Death Sword, a fighting game, players fight gory combat against one another or for the sake of a bikini-clad princess. Controversy over the game's packaging in the UK stoked this game's success.
Barbarian: The Ultimate Warrior	1987	Amiga	Also known as Death Sword, a fighting game, players fight gory combat against one another or for the sake of a bikini-clad princess. Controversy over the game's packaging in the UK stoked this game's success.
Barbarian: The Ultimate Warrior	1987	Amstrad CPC	Also known as Death Sword, a fighting game, players fight gory combat against one another or for the sake of a bikini-clad princess. Controversy over the game's packaging in the UK stoked this game's success.
Barbarian: The Ultimate Warrior	1987	Apple II	Also known as Death Sword, a fighting game, players fight gory combat against one another or for the sake of a bikini-clad princess. Controversy over the game's packaging in the UK stoked this game's success.
Barbarian: The Ultimate Warrior	1987	Atari ST	Also known as Death Sword, a fighting game, players fight gory combat against one another or for the sake of a bikini-clad princess. Controversy over the game's packaging in the UK stoked this game's success.
Barbarian: The Ultimate Warrior	1987	BBC Micro	Also known as Death Sword, a fighting game, players fight gory combat against one another or for the sake of a bikini-clad princess. Controversy over the game's packaging in the UK stoked this game's success.
Barbarian: The Ultimate Warrior	1987	Commodore 64	Also known as Death Sword, a fighting game, players fight gory combat against one another or for the sake of a bikini-clad princess. Controversy over the game's packaging in the UK stoked this game's success.
Barbarian: The Ultimate Warrior	1987	MS-DOS	Also known as Death Sword, a fighting game, players fight gory combat against one another or for the sake of a bikini-clad princess. Controversy over the game's packaging in the UK stoked this game's success.
Barbarian: The Ultimate Warrior	1987	ZX Spectrum	Also known as Death Sword, a fighting game, players fight gory combat against one another or for the sake of a bikini-clad princess. Controversy over the game's packaging in the UK stoked this game's success.
Barbarian II: Dungeons of Drax	1988	Acorn Electron	Also known as Axe of Rage, a fighting game, garnered much less attention than its predecessor
Barbarian II: Dungeons of Drax	1988	Amiga	Also known as Axe of Rage, a fighting game, garnered much less attention than its predecessor
Barbarian II: Dungeons of Drax	1988	Amstrad CPC	Also known as Axe of Rage, a fighting game, garnered much less attention than its predecessor
Barbarian II: Dungeons of Drax	1988	Atari ST	Also known as Axe of Rage, a fighting game, garnered much less attention than its predecessor
Barbarian II: Dungeons of Drax	1988	BBC Micro	Also known as Axe of Rage, a fighting game, garnered much less attention than its predecessor
Barbarian II: Dungeons of Drax	1988	Commodore 64	Also known as Axe of Rage, a fighting game, garnered much less attention than its predecessor
Barbarian II: Dungeons of Drax	1988	MS-DOS	Also known as Axe of Rage, a fighting game, garnered much less attention than its predecessor
Barbarian II: Dungeons of Drax	1988	MSX	Also known as Axe of Rage, a fighting game, garnered much less attention than its predecessor
Barbarian II: Dungeons of Drax	1988	ZX Spectrum	Also known as Axe of Rage, a fighting game, garnered much less attention than its predecessor
Barbie	1984	Commodore 64	Players must successfully prepare for a date with Barbie's male counterpart, Ken
Battle Bugs	1994	MS-DOS	A real-time tactics game featuring bugs battling in common household environments
Battle Bugs	1997	PlayStation	A real-time tactics game featuring bugs battling in common household environments
Battle Bugs	1994	Windows	A real-time tactics game featuring bugs battling in common household environments
Blue Lightning	1995	Jaguar CD	One of the first games for the Lynx, a pseudo-flight simulator where the pilot commands a military aircraft
Blue Lightning	1989	Lynx	One of the first games for the Lynx, a pseudo-flight simulator where the pilot commands a military aircraft
Break Dance	1984	Commodore 64	A rhythm game similar to Simon inspired by the then-current fad of breakdancing
Boulder Dash Construction Kit	1986		
California Games	1987	Amiga	A hit for Epyx, a collection of sport games purportedly popular in California, such as half-pipe skateboarding and surfing
California Games	1987	Amstrad CPC	A hit for Epyx, a collection of sport games purportedly popular in California, such as half-pipe skateboarding and surfing
California Games	1987	Apple II	A hit for Epyx, a collection of sport games purportedly popular in California, such as half-pipe skateboarding and surfing
California Games	1987	Apple IIGS	A hit for Epyx, a collection of sport games purportedly popular in California, such as half-pipe skateboarding and surfing
California Games	1987	Atari 2600	A hit for Epyx, a collection of sport games purportedly popular in California, such as half-pipe skateboarding and surfing
California Games	1987	Lynx	A hit for Epyx, a collection of sport games purportedly popular in California, such as half-pipe skateboarding and surfing
California Games	1987	Atari ST	A hit for Epyx, a collection of sport games purportedly popular in California, such as half-pipe skateboarding and surfing
California Games	1987	Commodore 64	A hit for Epyx, a collection of sport games purportedly popular in California, such as half-pipe skateboarding and surfing
California Games	1987	MS-DOS	A hit for Epyx, a collection of sport games purportedly popular in California, such as half-pipe skateboarding and surfing
California Games	1987	MSX	A hit for Epyx, a collection of sport games purportedly popular in California, such as half-pipe skateboarding and surfing
California Games	1987	NES	A hit for Epyx, a collection of sport games purportedly popular in California, such as half-pipe skateboarding and surfing
California Games	1987	Master System	A hit for Epyx, a collection of sport games purportedly popular in California, such as half-pipe skateboarding and surfing
California Games	1987	Genesis/Mega Drive	A hit for Epyx, a collection of sport games purportedly popular in California, such as half-pipe skateboarding and surfing
California Games	2008	Virtual Console	A hit for Epyx, a collection of sport games purportedly popular in California, such as half-pipe skateboarding and surfing
California Games	1987	ZX Spectrum	A hit for Epyx, a collection of sport games purportedly popular in California, such as half-pipe skateboarding and surfing
California Games II	1992	Amiga	A sequel to California Games, a collection of more California-themed sports games
California Games II	1992	Atari ST	A sequel to California Games, a collection of more California-themed sports games
California Games II	1990	MS-DOS	A sequel to California Games, a collection of more California-themed sports games
California Games II	2008	PlayStation Network	A sequel to California Games, a collection of more California-themed sports games
California Games II	1993	Master System	A sequel to California Games, a collection of more California-themed sports games
California Games II	1993	Super NES	A sequel to California Games, a collection of more California-themed sports games
California Games II	2008	Virtual Console	A sequel to California Games, a collection of more California-themed sports games
Championship Wrestling	1986	Apple II	A professional wrestling sports game
Championship Wrestling	1986	Atari ST	A professional wrestling sports game
Championship Wrestling	1987	Commodore 64	A professional wrestling sports game
Chip's Challenge	1989	Amiga	Originally designed for the Lynx, this puzzle video game was subsequently ported to several other platforms, sometimes more than once.
Chip's Challenge	1989	Amstrad CPC	Originally designed for the Lynx, this puzzle video game was subsequently ported to several other platforms, sometimes more than once.
Chip's Challenge	1989	Lynx	Originally designed for the Lynx, this puzzle video game was subsequently ported to several other platforms, sometimes more than once.
Chip's Challenge	1989	Atari ST	Originally designed for the Lynx, this puzzle video game was subsequently ported to several other platforms, sometimes more than once.
Chip's Challenge	1989	Commodore 64	Originally designed for the Lynx, this puzzle video game was subsequently ported to several other platforms, sometimes more than once.
Chip's Challenge	1989	MS-DOS	Originally designed for the Lynx, this puzzle video game was subsequently ported to several other platforms, sometimes more than once.
Chip's Challenge	1989	Windows	Originally designed for the Lynx, this puzzle video game was subsequently ported to several other platforms, sometimes more than once.
Chip's Challenge	1989	ZX Spectrum	Originally designed for the Lynx, this puzzle video game was subsequently ported to several other platforms, sometimes more than once.
Crush, Crumble and Chomp!	1981	Apple II	A movie monster strategy game where the player controls a monster and tries to destroy a city without getting killed
Crush, Crumble and Chomp!	1981	Atari 8-bit	A movie monster strategy game where the player controls a monster and tries to destroy a city without getting killed
Crush, Crumble and Chomp!	1981	Commodore 64	A movie monster strategy game where the player controls a monster and tries to destroy a city without getting killed
Crush, Crumble and Chomp!	1981	VIC-20	A movie monster strategy game where the player controls a monster and tries to destroy a city without getting killed
Crush, Crumble and Chomp!	1981	MS-DOS	A movie monster strategy game where the player controls a monster and tries to destroy a city without getting killed
Crush, Crumble and Chomp!	1981	TRS-80	A movie monster strategy game where the player controls a monster and tries to destroy a city without getting killed
Crypt of the Undead	1982	Apple II	a.k.a. The Crypt, a fantasy adventure game with light RPG elements.
Crypt of the Undead	1982	Atari 8-bit	a.k.a. The Crypt, a fantasy adventure game with light RPG elements.
Curse of Ra	1982		An expansion to Temple of Apshai, requiring the original game to play. Included in Temple of Apshai Trilogy
Danger in Drindisti	1981		An entry in the loosely tied Dunjonquest series of fantasy role-playing video games
The Datestones of Ryn	1979	Apple II	A "prequel" to Temple of Apshai and part of Epyx's loosely tied Dunjonquest series, a role-playing video game, perhaps the first example of an action role-playing game
The Datestones of Ryn	1979	Atari 8-bit	A "prequel" to Temple of Apshai and part of Epyx's loosely tied Dunjonquest series, a role-playing video game, perhaps the first example of an action role-playing game
The Datestones of Ryn	1979	PET	A "prequel" to Temple of Apshai and part of Epyx's loosely tied Dunjonquest series, a role-playing video game, perhaps the first example of an action role-playing game
The Datestones of Ryn	1979	TRS-80	A "prequel" to Temple of Apshai and part of Epyx's loosely tied Dunjonquest series, a role-playing video game, perhaps the first example of an action role-playing game
Destroyer	1986	Amiga	A well-received naval combat simulation
Destroyer	1986	Apple II	A well-received naval combat simulation
Destroyer	1986	Apple IIGS	A well-received naval combat simulation
Destroyer	1986	Commodore 64	A well-received naval combat simulation
Destroyer	1986	MS-DOS	A well-received naval combat simulation
Dragon's Eye	1981	Atari 8-bit	
Dragon's Eye	1981	Apple II	
Dragon's Eye	1981	PET	
Dragonriders of Pern	1983	Atari 8-bit	A strategy video game based on the series of books by Anne McCaffrey
Dragonriders of Pern	1983	Commodore 64	A strategy video game based on the series of books by Anne McCaffrey
ElectroCop	1989	Lynx	An action game where the player has to rescue the President's daughter
Escape from Vulcan's Isle	1982		
Fax	1983		
Final Assault	1987	Amiga	A mountain climbing simulation. Released as Chamonix Challenge in Europe.
Final Assault	1987	Amstrad CPC	A mountain climbing simulation. Released as Chamonix Challenge in Europe.
Final Assault	1987	Apple IIGS	A mountain climbing simulation. Released as Chamonix Challenge in Europe.
Final Assault	1987	Atari ST	A mountain climbing simulation. Released as Chamonix Challenge in Europe.
Final Assault	1987	Commodore 64	A mountain climbing simulation. Released as Chamonix Challenge in Europe.
Final Assault	1987	MS-DOS	A mountain climbing simulation. Released as Chamonix Challenge in Europe.
Final Assault	1987	ZX Spectrum	A mountain climbing simulation. Released as Chamonix Challenge in Europe.
Fore!	1982	Apple II	Published as Automated Simulations, a golf game.
G.I. Joe: A Real American Hero	1985	Apple II	An action shoot 'em up game based on the popular action figure
G.I. Joe: A Real American Hero	1985	Commodore 64	An action shoot 'em up game based on the popular action figure
The Games: Summer Edition	1988		
The Games: Winter Edition	1988		
Gates of Zendocon	1989	Lynx	A sci-fi shoot 'em up
Gateway to Apshai	1983	Atari 8-bit	An action-adventure role-playing video game that served as a prequel to the earlier Temple of Apshai
Gateway to Apshai	1983	ColecoVision	An action-adventure role-playing video game that served as a prequel to the earlier Temple of Apshai
Gateway to Apshai	1983	Commodore 64	An action-adventure role-playing video game that served as a prequel to the earlier Temple of Apshai
Hellfire Warrior	1980		An entry in the Dunjonquest series of role-playing video games
Hot Wheels	1984	Commodore 64	
Impossible Mission	1985	Acorn Electron	The player is a secret agent trying to thwart an evil genius's nefarious plans. Debuting on the Commodore 64, this widely hailed game featured aspects of various different game genres, such as action games, adventure games and platform games.
Impossible Mission	1986	Amstrad CPC	The player is a secret agent trying to thwart an evil genius's nefarious plans. Debuting on the Commodore 64, this widely hailed game featured aspects of various different game genres, such as action games, adventure games and platform games.
Impossible Mission	1984	Apple II	The player is a secret agent trying to thwart an evil genius's nefarious plans. Debuting on the Commodore 64, this widely hailed game featured aspects of various different game genres, such as action games, adventure games and platform games.
Impossible Mission	1987	Atari 7800	The player is a secret agent trying to thwart an evil genius's nefarious plans. Debuting on the Commodore 64, this widely hailed game featured aspects of various different game genres, such as action games, adventure games and platform games.
Impossible Mission	1985	BBC Micro	The player is a secret agent trying to thwart an evil genius's nefarious plans. Debuting on the Commodore 64, this widely hailed game featured aspects of various different game genres, such as action games, adventure games and platform games.
Impossible Mission	1984	Commodore 64	The player is a secret agent trying to thwart an evil genius's nefarious plans. Debuting on the Commodore 64, this widely hailed game featured aspects of various different game genres, such as action games, adventure games and platform games.
Impossible Mission	2007	Nintendo DS	The player is a secret agent trying to thwart an evil genius's nefarious plans. Debuting on the Commodore 64, this widely hailed game featured aspects of various different game genres, such as action games, adventure games and platform games.
Impossible Mission	1990	NES	The player is a secret agent trying to thwart an evil genius's nefarious plans. Debuting on the Commodore 64, this widely hailed game featured aspects of various different game genres, such as action games, adventure games and platform games.
Impossible Mission	2010	Oric Atmos	The player is a secret agent trying to thwart an evil genius's nefarious plans. Debuting on the Commodore 64, this widely hailed game featured aspects of various different game genres, such as action games, adventure games and platform games.
Impossible Mission	2007	PlayStation 2	The player is a secret agent trying to thwart an evil genius's nefarious plans. Debuting on the Commodore 64, this widely hailed game featured aspects of various different game genres, such as action games, adventure games and platform games.
Impossible Mission	2007	PlayStation Portable	The player is a secret agent trying to thwart an evil genius's nefarious plans. Debuting on the Commodore 64, this widely hailed game featured aspects of various different game genres, such as action games, adventure games and platform games.
Impossible Mission	1988	Master System	The player is a secret agent trying to thwart an evil genius's nefarious plans. Debuting on the Commodore 64, this widely hailed game featured aspects of various different game genres, such as action games, adventure games and platform games.
Impossible Mission	2007	Virtual Console	The player is a secret agent trying to thwart an evil genius's nefarious plans. Debuting on the Commodore 64, this widely hailed game featured aspects of various different game genres, such as action games, adventure games and platform games.
Impossible Mission	2007	Wii	The player is a secret agent trying to thwart an evil genius's nefarious plans. Debuting on the Commodore 64, this widely hailed game featured aspects of various different game genres, such as action games, adventure games and platform games.
Impossible Mission	1985	ZX Spectrum	The player is a secret agent trying to thwart an evil genius's nefarious plans. Debuting on the Commodore 64, this widely hailed game featured aspects of various different game genres, such as action games, adventure games and platform games.
Impossible Mission II	1988	Amiga	Follow-on sequel to Impossible Mission with expanded gameplay.
Impossible Mission II	1988	Amstrad CPC	Follow-on sequel to Impossible Mission with expanded gameplay.
Impossible Mission II	1988	Apple IIc	Follow-on sequel to Impossible Mission with expanded gameplay.
Impossible Mission II	1988	Apple IIe	Follow-on sequel to Impossible Mission with expanded gameplay.
Impossible Mission II	1988	Apple IIGS	Follow-on sequel to Impossible Mission with expanded gameplay.
Impossible Mission II	1988	Atari ST	Follow-on sequel to Impossible Mission with expanded gameplay.
Impossible Mission II	1988	Commodore 64	Follow-on sequel to Impossible Mission with expanded gameplay.
Impossible Mission II	1988	MS-DOS	Follow-on sequel to Impossible Mission with expanded gameplay.
Impossible Mission II	1989	NES	Follow-on sequel to Impossible Mission with expanded gameplay.
Impossible Mission II	1988	ZX Spectrum	Follow-on sequel to Impossible Mission with expanded gameplay.
Invasion Orion	1979	Apple II	A sci-fi strategy video game
Invasion Orion	1979	Atari 8-bit	A sci-fi strategy video game
Invasion Orion	1979	PET	A sci-fi strategy video game
Invasion Orion	1979	TRS-80	A sci-fi strategy video game
Jabbertalky	1982		
Jet Combat Simulator	1985	Commodore 64	Also known as Fighter Pilot. Developed by Digital Integration Ltd. Game Program Designed by David K. Marshall; Adapted for the Commodore 64 by Darrel Dennies.
Jumpman	1983	Apple II	Designed and programmed by Randy Glover, a platform game, a very successful game for Epyx, who sold it for years after its initial release
Jumpman	1983	Atari 8-bit	Designed and programmed by Randy Glover, a platform game, a very successful game for Epyx, who sold it for years after its initial release
Jumpman	1983	Commodore 64	Designed and programmed by Randy Glover, a platform game, a very successful game for Epyx, who sold it for years after its initial release
Jumpman	1983	MS-DOS	Designed and programmed by Randy Glover, a platform game, a very successful game for Epyx, who sold it for years after its initial release
Jumpman	1983	TI-89	Designed and programmed by Randy Glover, a platform game, a very successful game for Epyx, who sold it for years after its initial release
Jumpman	2008	Virtual Console	Designed and programmed by Randy Glover, a platform game, a very successful game for Epyx, who sold it for years after its initial release
Jumpman Junior	1983	Atari 8-bit	A "lite" version of Jumpman with only 12 levels
Jumpman Junior	1983	ColecoVision	A "lite" version of Jumpman with only 12 levels
Jumpman Junior	1983	Commodore 64	A "lite" version of Jumpman with only 12 levels
The Keys of Acheron	1981		An entry in the loosely tied Dunjonquest series of fantasy role-playing video games
King Arthur's Heir	1982		
L.A. Crackdown	1988		
Legend of Blacksilver	1988	Apple II	A fantasy role-playing video game that was met with lukewarm reception due to its stale graphics and unimaginative presentation
Legend of Blacksilver	1988	Commodore 64	A fantasy role-playing video game that was met with lukewarm reception due to its stale graphics and unimaginative presentation
Mind-Roll	1988	Amiga	Also known as Quedex. A marble dexterity game made by Thalamus.
Mind-Roll	1988	Commodore 64	Also known as Quedex. A marble dexterity game made by Thalamus.
Monster Maze	1982	VIC-20	
Morloc's Tower	1979		An entry in the loosely tied Dunjonquest series of fantasy role-playing video games
The Movie Monster Game	1986	Apple II	An action game where the player gets to assume the role of one of various monster movie standards
The Movie Monster Game	1986	Commodore 64	An action game where the player gets to assume the role of one of various monster movie standards
New World	1982		
The Nightmare	1982		
Oil Barons	1983	Apple II	A peculiar hybrid of video game and board game, this game sold poorly upon its release and is very rare today
Oil Barons	1983	Commodore 64	A peculiar hybrid of video game and board game, this game sold poorly upon its release and is very rare today
Oil Barons	1983	MS-DOS	A peculiar hybrid of video game and board game, this game sold poorly upon its release and is very rare today
Omnicron Conspiracy	1989		
Pitstop	1983		
Pitstop II	1984	Apple II	A widely hailed racing game, the first to implement a split-screen for simultaneous two-player racing
Pitstop II	1984	Atari 8-bit	A widely hailed racing game, the first to implement a split-screen for simultaneous two-player racing
Pitstop II	1984	Commodore 64	A widely hailed racing game, the first to implement a split-screen for simultaneous two-player racing
Pitstop II	1984	IBM PC (self-booting disk)	A widely hailed racing game, the first to implement a split-screen for simultaneous two-player racing
Pitstop II	1985	TRS-80 Color Computer	A widely hailed racing game, the first to implement a split-screen for simultaneous two-player racing
Pitstop II	2008	Virtual Console	A widely hailed racing game, the first to implement a split-screen for simultaneous two-player racing
PlatterMania	1982	Atari 8-bit	
Project Neptune	1989		
Purple Saturn Day	1989	Amiga	A sports game with a variety of Olympic-themed sci-fi events that garnered high praise
Purple Saturn Day	1989	Amstrad CPC	A sports game with a variety of Olympic-themed sci-fi events that garnered high praise
Purple Saturn Day	1989	Atari ST	A sports game with a variety of Olympic-themed sci-fi events that garnered high praise
Purple Saturn Day	1989	MS-DOS	A sports game with a variety of Olympic-themed sci-fi events that garnered high praise
Purple Saturn Day	1989	ZX Spectrum	A sports game with a variety of Olympic-themed sci-fi events that garnered high praise
Puzzle Panic	1984	Atari 8-bit	A puzzle game featuring a lightbulb named "Benny"
Puzzle Panic	1984	Commodore 64	A puzzle game featuring a lightbulb named "Benny"
Rad Warrior	1986	Commodore 64	Published as The Sacred Armour of Antiriad outside of North America and set in a post-apocalyptic Earth, a combination action puzzle and platform game; came with a 16-page comic book
Rad Warrior	1986	MS-DOS	Published as The Sacred Armour of Antiriad outside of North America and set in a post-apocalyptic Earth, a combination action puzzle and platform game; came with a 16-page comic book
Rad Warrior	1986	TRS-80	Published as The Sacred Armour of Antiriad outside of North America and set in a post-apocalyptic Earth, a combination action puzzle and platform game; came with a 16-page comic book
Rescue at Rigel	1980	Apple II	Probably inspired by the Iran hostage crisis, the player must rescue hostages on an asteroid orbiting the star Rigel
Rescue at Rigel	1980	Atari 8-bit	Probably inspired by the Iran hostage crisis, the player must rescue hostages on an asteroid orbiting the star Rigel
Rescue at Rigel	1980	PET	Probably inspired by the Iran hostage crisis, the player must rescue hostages on an asteroid orbiting the star Rigel
Rescue at Rigel	1980	IBM PC (self-booting disk)	Probably inspired by the Iran hostage crisis, the player must rescue hostages on an asteroid orbiting the star Rigel
Rescue at Rigel	1980	TRS-80	Probably inspired by the Iran hostage crisis, the player must rescue hostages on an asteroid orbiting the star Rigel
Rescue at Rigel	1980	VIC-20	Probably inspired by the Iran hostage crisis, the player must rescue hostages on an asteroid orbiting the star Rigel
Revenge of Defender	1988		
Ricochet	1981		
Rogue	1986	Amiga	A groundbreaking dungeon crawler that introduced a number of game innovations. Originally developed on the Berkeley Unix distribution, Epyx paid for three ports to home computers.
Rogue	1986	Atari ST	A groundbreaking dungeon crawler that introduced a number of game innovations. Originally developed on the Berkeley Unix distribution, Epyx paid for three ports to home computers.
Rogue	1986	TRS-80 Color Computer	A groundbreaking dungeon crawler that introduced a number of game innovations. Originally developed on the Berkeley Unix distribution, Epyx paid for three ports to home computers.
Snowstrike	1991		
Silicon Warrior	1983	Atari 8-bit	An action-puzzle game developed by The Connelley Group
Silicon Warrior	1983	Commodore 64	An action-puzzle game developed by The Connelley Group
Sorcerer of Siva	1981		An entry in the loosely tied Dunjonquest series of fantasy role-playing video games
Space Station Oblivion	1987	Amiga	Released as Driller outside North America, a sci-fi puzzle game
Space Station Oblivion	1987	Amstrad CPC	Released as Driller outside North America, a sci-fi puzzle game
Space Station Oblivion	1987	Atari ST	Released as Driller outside North America, a sci-fi puzzle game
Space Station Oblivion	1987	Commodore 64	Released as Driller outside North America, a sci-fi puzzle game
Space Station Oblivion	1987	MS-DOS	Released as Driller outside North America, a sci-fi puzzle game
Space Station Oblivion	1987	ZX Spectrum	Released as Driller outside North America, a sci-fi puzzle game
Spiderbot	1988	Commodore 64	Originally released in Europe as Arac by Addictive Software in 1986.
Starfleet Orion	1978	Apple II	The first game by Epyx, then Automated Simulations, a sci-fi turn-based strategy video game. A success, leading to its development of further games.
Starfleet Orion	1978	PET	The first game by Epyx, then Automated Simulations, a sci-fi turn-based strategy video game. A success, leading to its development of further games.
Starfleet Orion	1978	TRS-80	The first game by Epyx, then Automated Simulations, a sci-fi turn-based strategy video game. A success, leading to its development of further games.
Star Warrior	1981	Apple II	Branded as being part of its loosely related "Starquest" series, an early sci-fi role-playing video game when Epyx was still "Automated Simulations"
Star Warrior	1981	Atari 8-bit	Branded as being part of its loosely related "Starquest" series, an early sci-fi role-playing video game when Epyx was still "Automated Simulations"
Star Warrior	1981	TRS-80	Branded as being part of its loosely related "Starquest" series, an early sci-fi role-playing video game when Epyx was still "Automated Simulations"
Street Sports Baseball	1987	Apple II	A baseball sports game.
Street Sports Baseball	1987	Commodore 64	A baseball sports game.
Street Sports Baseball	1987	MS-DOS	A baseball sports game.
Street Sports Basketball	1987	Amiga	A sports game of basketball featuring 3-a-side games
Street Sports Basketball	1987	Amstrad CPC	A sports game of basketball featuring 3-a-side games
Street Sports Basketball	1987	Apple II	A sports game of basketball featuring 3-a-side games
Street Sports Basketball	1987	Commodore 64	A sports game of basketball featuring 3-a-side games
Street Sports Basketball	1987	MS-DOS	A sports game of basketball featuring 3-a-side games
Street Sports Basketball	1987	ZX Spectrum	A sports game of basketball featuring 3-a-side games
Street Sports Football	1988	Commodore 64	A football sports game
Street Sports Football	1988	Apple II	A football sports game
Street Sports Soccer	1988	Commodore 64	Another in Epyx's "street sports" line, this one featuring soccer
Street Sports Soccer	1988	Apple II	Another in Epyx's "street sports" line, this one featuring soccer
Street Sports Soccer	1988	MS-DOS	Another in Epyx's "street sports" line, this one featuring soccer
Sub Battle Simulator	1987	Amiga	A naval combat simulation game set during WWII where players can play as the American or German forces
Sub Battle Simulator	1987	Apple II	A naval combat simulation game set during WWII where players can play as the American or German forces
Sub Battle Simulator	1987	Apple IIGS	A naval combat simulation game set during WWII where players can play as the American or German forces
Sub Battle Simulator	1987	Atari ST	A naval combat simulation game set during WWII where players can play as the American or German forces
Sub Battle Simulator	1987	Commodore 64	A naval combat simulation game set during WWII where players can play as the American or German forces
Sub Battle Simulator	1987	MS-DOS	A naval combat simulation game set during WWII where players can play as the American or German forces
Sub Battle Simulator	1987	Mac	A naval combat simulation game set during WWII where players can play as the American or German forces
Sub Battle Simulator	1987	Tandy Color Computer 3	A naval combat simulation game set during WWII where players can play as the American or German forces
Summer Games	1984	Amiga	A sports game including several games featured in the Summer Olympic Games such as pole vaulting, platform diving and gymnastics, among others
Summer Games	1984	Apple II	A sports game including several games featured in the Summer Olympic Games such as pole vaulting, platform diving and gymnastics, among others
Summer Games	1984	Atari 2600	A sports game including several games featured in the Summer Olympic Games such as pole vaulting, platform diving and gymnastics, among others
Summer Games	1984	Atari 7800	A sports game including several games featured in the Summer Olympic Games such as pole vaulting, platform diving and gymnastics, among others
Summer Games	1984	Atari 8-bit	A sports game including several games featured in the Summer Olympic Games such as pole vaulting, platform diving and gymnastics, among others
Summer Games	1984	Commodore 64	A sports game including several games featured in the Summer Olympic Games such as pole vaulting, platform diving and gymnastics, among others
Summer Games	1984	Master System	A sports game including several games featured in the Summer Olympic Games such as pole vaulting, platform diving and gymnastics, among others
Summer Games	1984	ZX Spectrum	A sports game including several games featured in the Summer Olympic Games such as pole vaulting, platform diving and gymnastics, among others
Summer Games	2005	Windows Mobile	A sports game including several games featured in the Summer Olympic Games such as pole vaulting, platform diving and gymnastics, among others
Summer Games II	1985	Amiga	A sequel to Summer Games, this sports game features additional events from the Summer Olympic Games
Summer Games II	1985	Amstrad CPC	A sequel to Summer Games, this sports game features additional events from the Summer Olympic Games
Summer Games II	1985	Apple II	A sequel to Summer Games, this sports game features additional events from the Summer Olympic Games
Summer Games II	1985	Atari ST	A sequel to Summer Games, this sports game features additional events from the Summer Olympic Games
Summer Games II	1985	Commodore 64	A sequel to Summer Games, this sports game features additional events from the Summer Olympic Games
Summer Games II	1985	MS-DOS	A sequel to Summer Games, this sports game features additional events from the Summer Olympic Games
Summer Games II	1985	ZX Spectrum	A sequel to Summer Games, this sports game features additional events from the Summer Olympic Games
Summer Games II	2008	Virtual Console	A sequel to Summer Games, this sports game features additional events from the Summer Olympic Games
Super Cycle	1986	Amstrad CPC	A motorcycle racing game.
Super Cycle	1986	Atari ST	A motorcycle racing game.
Super Cycle	1986	Commodore 64	A motorcycle racing game.
Super Cycle	1986	ZX Spectrum	A motorcycle racing game.
Sword of Fargoal	1983	Commodore 64	A popular but difficult dungeon crawler featuring several aspects of the roguelike games
Sword of Fargoal	1982	PET	A popular but difficult dungeon crawler featuring several aspects of the roguelike games
Sword of Fargoal	1982	VIC-20	A popular but difficult dungeon crawler featuring several aspects of the roguelike games
Temple of Apshai	1979	Amiga	An early role-playing video game released during the height of the initial popularity of Dungeons & Dragons, the first entry in the Dunjonquest series was an enormous hit for Epyx, then known as Automated Simulations
Temple of Apshai	1979	Amstrad CPC	An early role-playing video game released during the height of the initial popularity of Dungeons & Dragons, the first entry in the Dunjonquest series was an enormous hit for Epyx, then known as Automated Simulations
Temple of Apshai	1979	Apple II	An early role-playing video game released during the height of the initial popularity of Dungeons & Dragons, the first entry in the Dunjonquest series was an enormous hit for Epyx, then known as Automated Simulations
Temple of Apshai	1979	Atari 8-bit	An early role-playing video game released during the height of the initial popularity of Dungeons & Dragons, the first entry in the Dunjonquest series was an enormous hit for Epyx, then known as Automated Simulations
Temple of Apshai	1979	Atari ST	An early role-playing video game released during the height of the initial popularity of Dungeons & Dragons, the first entry in the Dunjonquest series was an enormous hit for Epyx, then known as Automated Simulations
Temple of Apshai	1979	Commodore 64	An early role-playing video game released during the height of the initial popularity of Dungeons & Dragons, the first entry in the Dunjonquest series was an enormous hit for Epyx, then known as Automated Simulations
Temple of Apshai	1979	PET	An early role-playing video game released during the height of the initial popularity of Dungeons & Dragons, the first entry in the Dunjonquest series was an enormous hit for Epyx, then known as Automated Simulations
Temple of Apshai	1979	VIC-20	An early role-playing video game released during the height of the initial popularity of Dungeons & Dragons, the first entry in the Dunjonquest series was an enormous hit for Epyx, then known as Automated Simulations
Temple of Apshai	1979	MS-DOS	An early role-playing video game released during the height of the initial popularity of Dungeons & Dragons, the first entry in the Dunjonquest series was an enormous hit for Epyx, then known as Automated Simulations
Temple of Apshai	1979	Mac	An early role-playing video game released during the height of the initial popularity of Dungeons & Dragons, the first entry in the Dunjonquest series was an enormous hit for Epyx, then known as Automated Simulations
Temple of Apshai	1979	TRS-80	An early role-playing video game released during the height of the initial popularity of Dungeons & Dragons, the first entry in the Dunjonquest series was an enormous hit for Epyx, then known as Automated Simulations
Temple of Apshai Trilogy	1985		A repackaging of Temple of Apshai with its two expansion packs, Upper Reaches of Apshai and Curse of Ra
Tuesday Morning Quarterback	1980	Apple II	Released under Automated Simulations, an American football simulation, featuring single player and player-vs.-player gameplay.
Tuesday Morning Quarterback	1981	TRS-80	Released under Automated Simulations, an American football simulation, featuring single player and player-vs.-player gameplay.
Upper Reaches of Apshai	1982		An expansion pack for Temple of Apshai that required the original program to run. Included in Temple of Apshai Trilogy
Winter Games	1985	Atari 2600	A sports game including several events featured in the Winter Olympic Games such as alpine skiing, ski jumping and biathlon, among others
Winter Games	1985	Atari 8-bit	A sports game including several events featured in the Winter Olympic Games such as alpine skiing, ski jumping and biathlon, among others
Winter Games	1985	Commodore 64	A sports game including several events featured in the Winter Olympic Games such as alpine skiing, ski jumping and biathlon, among others
Winter Games	1985	MS-DOS	A sports game including several events featured in the Winter Olympic Games such as alpine skiing, ski jumping and biathlon, among others
World Games	1986	Amiga	A continuation of its successful Olympic-themed games such as Summer Games and Winter Games, this sports game features several events that are popular in different parts of the world, but not necessarily featured in the Olympic Games, such as log rolling and sumo wrestling.
World Games	1986	Amstrad CPC	A continuation of its successful Olympic-themed games such as Summer Games and Winter Games, this sports game features several events that are popular in different parts of the world, but not necessarily featured in the Olympic Games, such as log rolling and sumo wrestling.
World Games	1986	Apple IIe	A continuation of its successful Olympic-themed games such as Summer Games and Winter Games, this sports game features several events that are popular in different parts of the world, but not necessarily featured in the Olympic Games, such as log rolling and sumo wrestling.
World Games	1986	Apple IIGS	A continuation of its successful Olympic-themed games such as Summer Games and Winter Games, this sports game features several events that are popular in different parts of the world, but not necessarily featured in the Olympic Games, such as log rolling and sumo wrestling.
World Games	1986	Atari ST	A continuation of its successful Olympic-themed games such as Summer Games and Winter Games, this sports game features several events that are popular in different parts of the world, but not necessarily featured in the Olympic Games, such as log rolling and sumo wrestling.
World Games	1986	Commodore 64	A continuation of its successful Olympic-themed games such as Summer Games and Winter Games, this sports game features several events that are popular in different parts of the world, but not necessarily featured in the Olympic Games, such as log rolling and sumo wrestling.
World Games	1986	MS-DOS	A continuation of its successful Olympic-themed games such as Summer Games and Winter Games, this sports game features several events that are popular in different parts of the world, but not necessarily featured in the Olympic Games, such as log rolling and sumo wrestling.
World Games	1986	MSX	A continuation of its successful Olympic-themed games such as Summer Games and Winter Games, this sports game features several events that are popular in different parts of the world, but not necessarily featured in the Olympic Games, such as log rolling and sumo wrestling.
World Games	1986	Master System	A continuation of its successful Olympic-themed games such as Summer Games and Winter Games, this sports game features several events that are popular in different parts of the world, but not necessarily featured in the Olympic Games, such as log rolling and sumo wrestling.
World Games	2008	Virtual Console	A continuation of its successful Olympic-themed games such as Summer Games and Winter Games, this sports game features several events that are popular in different parts of the world, but not necessarily featured in the Olympic Games, such as log rolling and sumo wrestling.
World Games	1986	ZX Spectrum	A continuation of its successful Olympic-themed games such as Summer Games and Winter Games, this sports game features several events that are popular in different parts of the world, but not necessarily featured in the Olympic Games, such as log rolling and sumo wrestling.
World Karate Championship	1986	Amstrad CPC	A karate fighting game, known as International Karate outside North America
World Karate Championship	1986	Apple II	A karate fighting game, known as International Karate outside North America
World Karate Championship	1986	Atari 8-bit	A karate fighting game, known as International Karate outside North America
World Karate Championship	1986	Atari ST	A karate fighting game, known as International Karate outside North America
World Karate Championship	1986	Commodore 16	A karate fighting game, known as International Karate outside North America
World Karate Championship	1986	Commodore 64	A karate fighting game, known as International Karate outside North America
World Karate Championship	1986	MS-DOS	A karate fighting game, known as International Karate outside North America
World Karate Championship	1986	Game Boy Advance	A karate fighting game, known as International Karate outside North America
World Karate Championship	1986	Game Boy Color	A karate fighting game, known as International Karate outside North America
World Karate Championship	1986	MSX	A karate fighting game, known as International Karate outside North America
World Karate Championship	2008	Virtual Console	A karate fighting game, known as International Karate outside North America
World Karate Championship	1985	ZX Spectrum	A karate fighting game, known as International Karate outside North America
Zarlor Mercenary	1990	Lynx	Vertically scrolling shooter

=== Other software ===
Name	Year	Platforms	Description
Microsoft Multiplan	1985	Commodore 64	An early spreadsheet program developed by Microsoft. Although the Multiplan article states it was distributed by Human Engineered Software for the Commodore 64, it was later distributed by Epyx.
Vorpal Utility Kit	1985	Commodore 64	Floppy disk utilities, including 1541 Head Alignment, File Recovery, Super-Fast Disk Format, Super-Fast File Backup, Super-Fast Disk Backups, Disk Drive Speed Check, and Vorpal* Save/Load.
Vorpal Utility Kit	1985	Commodore 128	Floppy disk utilities, including 1541 Head Alignment, File Recovery, Super-Fast Disk Format, Super-Fast File Backup, Super-Fast Disk Backups, Disk Drive Speed Check, and Vorpal* Save/Load.
Programmers' BASIC Toolkit	1985	Commodore 64	An extension to the Commodore BASIC V2.0 programming language. It adds over 100 new commands to the BASIC language, providing an easy-to-use API to the relatively advanced (at the time) graphics and sound hardware capabilities of the Commodore 64.
Print Magic	1988	Apple II	A home desktop publishing suite, it outperformed the contemporary market leader at the time, The Print Shop, on all levels, though not a great commercial success
Print Magic	1988	MS-DOS	A home desktop publishing suite, it outperformed the contemporary market leader at the time, The Print Shop, on all levels, though not a great commercial success

=== Hardware ===
Name	Year	Description	Image
Epyx Fast Load	1984	A powerful disk drive loading accelerator, one of the most widely used peripherals for the Commodore 64, it also contained a number of other useful software tools	
500XJ joystick		An Atari compatible joystick that was innovative in that its base was molded to more naturally fit a player's hand, so it was easier to use than traditional rectangular-based joysticks. Variations were released that were compatible with the NES and Master System.	
Handy	1989	A handheld game console that was innovative in many ways. Short on capital at the time, however, Epyx licensed it to Atari, who christened it the Atari Lynx	
