= Fore! (video game) =

1982 sports video game

- Publisher: Automated Simulations
- Platform: Apple II
- Release: 1982
- Genre: Sports

Fore! is a 1982 video game published by Automated Simulations.

== Gameplay ==
Fore! is a golf game which includes a driving range for players to use for practice, an 18 hole course for anyone to use, and a longer more challenging 18 hole course for the championship.

== Reception ==
Stanley Greenlaw reviewed the game for Computer Gaming World, and stated that "The main skill involved in the game is selecting the correct club and swing strength for your shot. The shot will fall more or less in the area in which you aim. Wind direction, which only changes after the first nine, can affect the flight of the ball."
