= Crush, Crumble and Chomp! =

1981 video game

- Developer: Epyx
- Publisher: Epyx
- Designers: Jon Freeman; Jim Connelley
- Platforms: Apple II, Atari 8-bit, Commodore 64, MS-DOS, TRS-80, VIC-20
- Release: NA: 1981; EU: 1983
- Genre: Strategy
- Mode: Single-player

Crush, Crumble and Chomp! (Note: The game's subtitle on the title screen is "The Movie Monster Game") is a strategy video game developed and published in 1981 by Epyx for the TRS-80, Apple II, and Atari 8-bit computers. Ports to the VIC-20, Commodore 64, and IBM PC compatibles were released later. Some versions were published under the company's original name of Automated Simulations, while the rest use Epyx.

== Gameplay ==
Crush, Crumble and Chomp! is a turn-based action game played on a scrolling 2D grid-based map. The player takes control of a movie monster and attacks a major city much in the manner of the classic horror movies of the 1950s.

=== Monsters ===
- Goshilla: a giant lizard-like monster resembling Godzilla with a breath weapon and leaving a corrosive trail of radioactive waste.
- The Kraken: a giant octopus similar to It that can attack bridges and seaside ports and then slip into the water to hide from attack. However, the Kraken can not go on land.
- Arachnis: a giant spider similar to Tarantula that can clog roads with its web and can escape underground via its network of secret tunnels.
- The Glob: a monster similar to The Blob that can travel underground in the city's sewer and absorb obstacles in its path. It also leaves a flammable trail of slime in its wake.
- Mechismo: a towering tank-like robotic automation with multiple legs not unlike the machines from War of the Worlds. (Note: The character looks different in the manual, resembling a humanoid monster robot) It sports an exotic array of alien weaponry, such as ray guns.
- Mantra: a giant flying reptile similar to Rodan that can fly over water.

The game also allows the player to "grow" their own monster, with several basic shapes to choose from and a number of "crunch credits" to spend on custom abilities. Most of the shapes are based on available monsters with unique shapes being based on a Brontosaurus and a giant Serpent. The number of credits available, and the cost of some abilities, depends on the shape chosen. The player can add a number of abilities until their credits are exhausted.

=== Objectives ===
There a number of objectives for the player to complete throughout the game, with the player selecting a specific objective that can benefit the monster selected in terms of point rewards.

- Balanced: General game play.
- Killer Monster: Acquire points for killing humans.
- Combat Machine: Acquire points by destroying combat vehicles (ie the military).
- Destruction: Acquire points by destroying buildings and infrastructure.
- Survival: Escape and evade the military's assault.

=== Cities ===
There are four cities to choose from.

- New York City
- Golden Gate
- Washington D.C.
- Tokyo

After attacking a city—the main activity of the game—players are rated on how well they did. Players are rated even if their monsters die in the attack and can achieve a high score for what they accomplished before expiring.

== Development ==
The game engine is in BASIC and uses character graphics for the map and player, using basic graphics on platforms that support it. On the Atari 8-bit computers, for instance, the map is created out of a custom character set and presented in a low-resolution mode that allows up to four colors. The same engine was used in most of Epyx's games from the early 1980s.

== Reception ==
Stanley Greenlaw reviewed the game for Computer Gaming World, and stated that "If you have enjoyed other Automated Simulation games you will not be disappointed in this one. It has the traditional Automated Simulation game mechanics, improved graphics, and a highly entertaining theme."

The game was reviewed in 1982 in The Dragon #65 by Bruce Humphrey. Humphrey concluded that "The game system isn't perfect, from the player/monster point of view," but "The game is satisfying, however, from a fun-to-play standpoint, and that counts more." Jerry Pournelle stated that he was "particularly partial" to Crush in BYTE in 1983. He called it "my all-time favorite" in 1984, writing "there's something exceedingly attractive about burning down and stomping the Pentagon flat, and in general making an even bigger mess of Washington than the politicians have".

Steve Loniewski reviewed Crush, Crumble and Chomp in Ares Magazine #14 and commented that "Crush, Crumble and Chomp is a fine, well thought-out game that ought to keep our subdued destructive impulses at bay for one more evening."

== Legacy ==
Epyx released a similar game in 1986 as The Movie Monster Game.
