= Starfleet Orion =

1978 video game

- Rule book cover art
- Developer: Epyx
- Publisher: Epyx
- Designers: Jon Freeman; Jim Connelley
- Platforms: PET, TRS-80, Apple II
- Release: 1978
- Genre: Sci-Fi strategy game
- Mode: Multiplayer

Starfleet Orion is a 1978 science fiction strategy game written and published by Automated Simulations (who would become Epyx in 1983). It appears to be the first space-themed strategy game sold for microcomputer systems. The game was originally written in BASIC for the PET, but later ported to other early home computer platforms including the TRS-80 and Apple II. The game was something of a success, leading to a string of successes for the company, notably the major hit Temple of Apshai.

== Plot ==
Orion's "Battle Manual" tells of the meeting of the Interstellar Union of Civilized Planets, or simply Stellar Union, and a group of planets colonized hundreds of years earlier by a forgotten breakaway group. The action takes place in an isolated corner of the expanding Stellar Union's space, allowing the two forces to be fairly evenly balanced as the much larger Union only can only muster a small number ships in the area. The game came with twelve pre-rolled scenarios based on this canon, each increasing the number of ships and their variety, eventually ending in a battle with seven ships on one side and nine on the other, the later being named the titular "Starfleet Orion".

== Gameplay ==
TRS-80 splash screen

The playfield is a thirty-two high by sixty-four wide grid of possible locations. The map can contain ships, stacked on the same grid space if needed, as well as planets and other objects. The game is turn based, with the two players taking turns at the keyboard to enter their commands, which are then carried out simultaneously. Each player controls one or more ships, and the game continues until one or both are destroyed, or escape by flying off the playfield.

Ships are powered by a single energy source whose power has to be divided up among the many parts of the ship, including drives, shields and weapons. Each ship is armed with a beam weapon whose chance to hit a target is based on the target's size and the "beam quality" of the firing ship. The amount of damage caused by a hit are reduced with distance, making it primarily a short-range weapon. In addition, ships are armed with missiles or torpedoes for long-range fire. Missiles fly to a location in space relative to the ship after movement and then explode regardless if there is a target in that location. Torpedoes are fired in a particular direction (the eight cardinals) and explode if they pass within two grid spaces of any other material object (except other torpedoes). Some ships also include fighters equipped with missiles or torpedoes, which allow spoiling attacks. Generally the Stellar Union ships have more missiles, and the Orion ships more torpedoes.

Additionally, ships are equipped with a tractor beam that allow them to push or pull on material objects, allowing complicated strategies of pushing or pulling on opposing ships to throw off their aim. For instance, a torpedo aimed at a ship that is expected to be "due left" after the movement phase could be avoided by the target by pushing the opposing ship a few locations down. The distance a ship can be pushed or pulled is a relative measure of the strength of the beam and the mass of the target. This means larger ships can spoil the aim of smaller torpedo boats using this method, while smaller ships are better off simply using their drives to move themselves. Another useful strategy is to use the tractor beam to quickly push fighters into range of their targets, at "speeds" their own engines could not achieve.

The game originally shipped on cassette, and required the users to type in the scenario and save it to a separate data tape before playing. (Note: Actually, in Commodore BASIC it was possible to save named files to tape. To load by name, the cassette would start reading the tape as normal, ignoring files with other names. This was a fairly unique capability, one that would have allowed the scenarios be saved onto the same cassette as the game program itself. The scenario files were not very large, so the delay in loading later ones would not be onerous. It is not clear why they did not use this facility) The pre-rolled missions were outlined in a separate "Battle Manual", which also included short stories introducing the game world and the individual missions. This process was greatly improved on the diskette versions, which had the games saved out as data files that could be loaded up by name. Users could also create their own scenarios using the separate "BUILDER" program, saving them to tape or disk.

The Starfleet Orion game manual includes the complete source code.

== Development ==
The game came about in a roundabout fashion when Jon Freeman joined a Dungeons & Dragons game being hosted by dungeon master Jim Connelly. Freeman was an experienced gamer, a regular contributor to Games magazine and author of A Player's Guide to Board Games. Connelly had purchased a PET computer to handle bookkeeping during his D&D games, and was interested in finding ways to make some of the money back. The two collaborated on Orion; Freeman coming up with the basic concepts of the game and Connelly coding them up. The game was completed just before Christmas 1978.

Automated Simulations claimed in advertisements for the $19.95 Starfleet Orion that "game mechanics are extremely simple, but play is exciting, challenging, and rich in detail". Versions were available for the Commodore PET, TRS-80, and Apple II. The complex setup and requirement for two players was an obstacle to casual play, which led Freeman and Connolley to quickly release the single-player Invasion Orion.

== Reception ==
Alan Isabelle reviewed Starfleet Orion in The Space Gamer No. 30. Isabelle commented that "I was quite impressed by Starfleet Orion. I have seen enough bug-ridden, boring computer games to know when a good one comes along. I highly recommend it in spite of the rather high price."

Jerry Pournelle praised the Orion games' realism: "Classical principles of fleet warfare work, and strategy and tactics are more important than luck".

The game was considered historically important enough that it appeared in a chronology of personal computers written by David H. Ahl.
