= Street Sports Basketball =

1987 video game

- Developer: Epyx
- Publishers: NA: Epyx; EU: U.S. Gold
- Artist: Dave Worton
- Platforms: Amiga, Amstrad CPC, Apple II, Commodore 64, MS-DOS, ZX Spectrum
- Release: NA: 1987; EU: 1988
- Genre: Sports

Street Sports Basketball is a 1987 sports video game for IBM PC compatibles, Amstrad CPC, Amiga, Apple II, Commodore 64, and ZX Spectrum. It was developed by Epyx and published by U.S. Gold.

== Gameplay ==
The game features a 3-a-side basketball match. Each team is made by three players with different skills chosen from the neighbours.

== Reception ==
Computer Gaming World stated in 1987 that Street Sports Basketball's "graphics are smooth and the action is fast". The game was reviewed in 1988 in Dragon #131 by Hartley, Patricia, and Kirk Lesser in "The Role of Computers" column. The reviewers gave the game 3 1/2 out of 5 stars.
