= Street Sports Baseball =

1987 video game

- Publisher: Epyx
- Platforms: Apple II, Commodore 64, DOS
- Release: 1987

Street Sports Baseball is a 1987 video game published by Epyx.

== Gameplay ==
Street Sports Baseball is a game in which the 16 available players of the 52nd Street gang play baseball on an improvised field.

== Reception ==
Rick Teverbaugh reviewed the game for Computer Gaming World, and stated that "Street Sports Baseball is more reminiscent than whimsical, but it is no less fun. Remember the sandlot games where home plate was a garbage can lid and old tree stumps were just part of the hazards of outfield duty? Well, all that and more comes alive in this excellent program."
