= Break Dance =

1984 video game

- European cover art
- Developer: Beck-Tech
- Publishers: NA: Epyx; EU: Epyx
- Designer: Stephen Beck
- Platform: Commodore 64
- Release: NA: 1984; EU: 1984
- Genre: Sports
- Modes: Single-player; Multiplayer

Break Dance (also known as Breakdance) is a 1984 rhythm game developed by Beck-Tech and published by Epyx in North America and Europe for the Commodore 64. The game relies on players making dancing moves that resemble the classic game Simon Says. The game capitalized on early 1980s-era b-boying, which was a popular trend in American culture. The game was inspired by the films Flashdance and Beat Street.

== Gameplay ==
A computer character performs a pattern of five break dancing moves that must be copied by the player. One new move is added to every round, making the game more complicated as the player progresses through each stage.

== Reception ==
Ahoy! stated of the Commodore 64 version that Becktech had "thoroughly analyzed the subject to create an authentic action-simulation", with the Rocket Crew level being the best.

== See also ==
- Space Channel 5
