= Fore (golf) =

Warning yelled by golfers

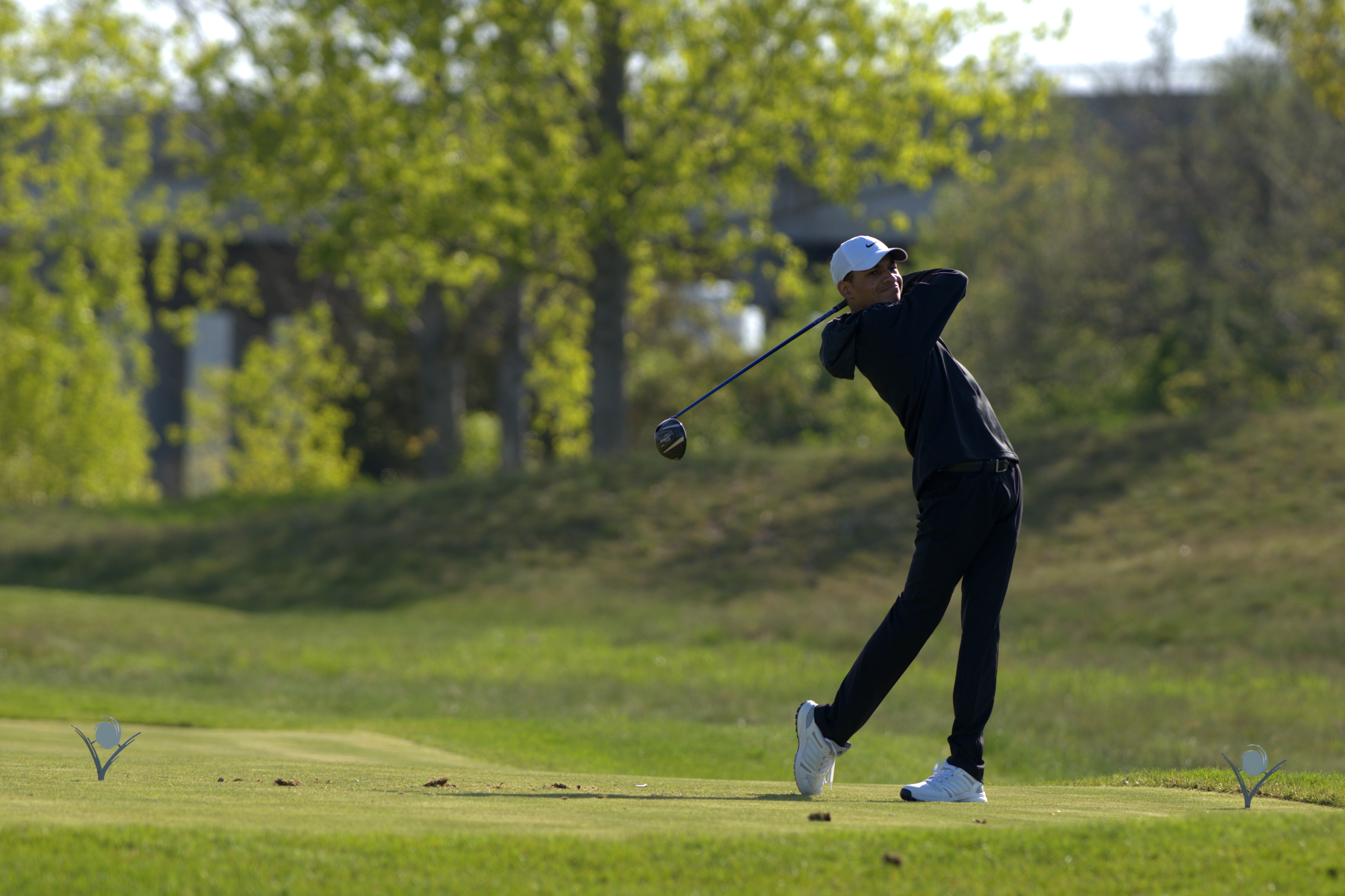
Example of someone driving a golf ball.

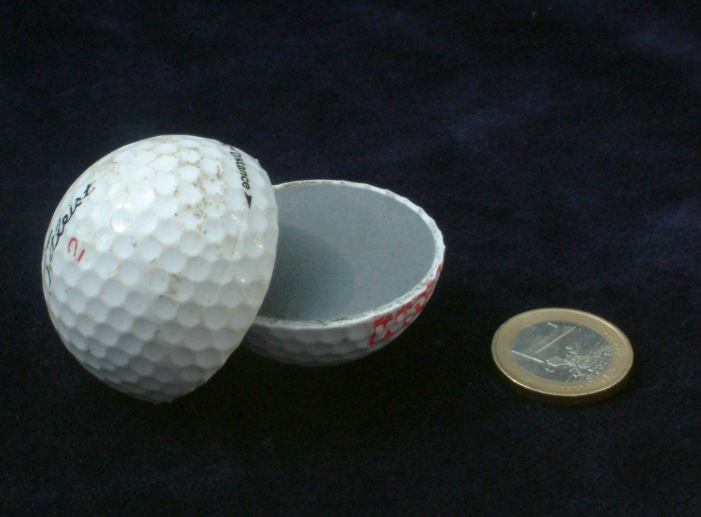
The tough rubber core of a golf ball makes it a hazard to others following a wayward shot, despite its weight not exceeding 1.620 oz (45.9 g).

"Fore!", originally a Scots interjection, is used to warn anyone standing or moving in the flight of a golf ball. The etymology of the word in this usage is uncertain. Mention of the term in an 1881 British Golf Museum indicates that the term was in use at least as early as that period.

A possible origin of the word is the term "fore-caddie", a caddie waiting down range from the golfer to find where the ball lands. These caddies were often warned about oncoming golf balls by a shout of the term "fore-caddie" which was eventually shortened to just "fore!". The Colonel Bogey March is based on the descending minor third which the original Colonel Bogey whistled instead of yelling "fore" around 1914.

A somewhat dubious alternate origin theory promulgated by the Irish states that "fore!" may have been a contraction of the Gaelic cry Faugh A Ballagh! (i.e. Clear the way!) which is still associated with the sport of road bowling which has features reminiscent of golf.
