= Dimension X (video game) =

1984 video game

- UK box cover
- Developer: Synapse Software
- Publishers: Synapse Software; Americana Software (UK)
- Designer: Steve Hales
- Platform: Atari 8-bit
- Release: 1984
- Genre: Vehicular combat
- Mode: Single-player

Dimension X is a first-person vehicular combat game for Atari 8-bit computers released in 1984 by Synapse Software. It was designed by Steve Hales, who previously wrote Slime and Fort Apocalypse for Synapse. Dimension X has gameplay similar to Atari's Battlezone and Novagen's Encounter (the latter of which was distributed in the US by Synapse). The player controls an attack craft hovering over a checkerboard-patterned landscape while to destroy enemy ships.

The game was advertised far in advance of its release, emphasizing the 3D effect of the flat terrain. Magazine ads included features which did not exist or were not as impressive in the final game which contributed to a negative reception. The manual includes instructions for a Commodore 64 version of the game, but it was never completed nor released.

== Gameplay ==
First-person view from the player's vehicle. The 5x5 sector map is in the upper right.

The game is played from a first-person perspective, where the player sits inside the cockpit of a flying vehicle and fires missiles at "Regillian" enemies. Many elements of Dimension X have analogs in Star Raiders. The game world consists of a 5x5 grid of sectors which need to be cleared of Regillians. In Star Raiders the enemies attempt to surround and destroy sectors containing motherships; here the Regillians attempt to surround and destroy a sector containing the capitol. Systems of the player's ship can be damaged by enemy fire, such as the scanner and map. Moving between sectors requires holding a crosshair steady in addition to moving over and under obstacles.

== Development ==
Dimension X was advertised over nine months before being available. Magazine ads showed what appeared to be a texture-mapped ground plane using a technique promoted as "altered perspective scrolling". The ads also included a 64 sector map screen, which was not in the final game. In Halcyon Days: Interviews with Classic Computer and Video Game Programmers, designer Steve Hales said:

We had a cool graphic display, but no game. [Synapse co-founder Ihor Wolosenko] and I tried to create a game, but it just wasn't fun. We ended up with a B+, or even a C game. One of the first lessons in game design I ever got.

When the game was eventually released, it was met with generally poor reviews.

== Reception ==
In a new product overview in ANALOG Computing, Lee H. Pappas wrote: "The only outstanding feature of the game is the scroll-in-any-direction moire pattern landscape". In the review in the same issue, Robert T. Martin found the game didn't live up to the developer's standards:

Synapse, however, has fallen short with Dimension X. What's missing is the element of skill that Star Raiders requires. Dimension X can be completed very successfully by anyone who understands the game and connects the rules to the screen graphics. I've made it through the game every time at the highest difficulty settings without having to refuel, repair or retreat.

He also criticized the box art for showing features that don't exist in the game, such as tanks and spaceships.

The June 1984 issue of ROM magazine was more positive, giving the game an 8.8 out of 10. It was reviewed alongside Encounter, as the reviewer compared both games with Atari's Battlezone.
