= Ninja (1986 video game) =

1986 video game

- Developer: Sculptured Software
- Publisher: Mastertronic
- Designer: Steve Coleman
- Platforms: Amiga, Amstrad CPC, Arcade, Atari 8-bit, Atari ST, Commodore 64, MS-DOS, ZX Spectrum
- Release: NA: 1986
- Genre: Beat 'em up
- Mode: Single-player

Ninja is a beat 'em up game developed by Sculptured Software and released by Mastertronic in 1986 for the Atari 8-bit computers, Commodore 64, and ZX Spectrum, then in 1987 for the Amstrad CPC, Amiga, Atari ST, and MS-DOS. An arcade version of the game was released in 1987 for Mastertronic's Arcadia Systems which is based on Amiga hardware. The Amiga, Atari ST, and Arcade versions were released as Ninja Mission. As a Ninja, the player attacks a fortress made of individual fixed screens which can be explored non-linearly.

Ninja was written by Steve Coleman, who previously created the Atari 8-bit games Rainbow Walker and The Pharaoh's Curse.

== Gameplay ==
Atari 8-bit screenshot

The player controls a ninja who has to penetrate a Japanese palace by fighting enemy ninjas with karate moves and by throwing shurikens and daggers. On his way, he has to collect six idols and the hidden entrance to Akuma's loft will appear, where the seventh idol awaits, the ninja then must return to torii.

The palace is a series of horizontal, flip-screen segments that are stacked vertically. The player is not forced along a specific route, but can explore both sides of a branching path and also backtrack to earlier screens.

== Reception ==
Reception

Award
Publication	Award
Computer and Video Games	C+VG Hit

Ninja received mixed reviews. Bob Chappell writing for Atari User found the game very good with "first rate animation and sound. [...] For the low price, an unmissable bargain". Computer Gamer reviewer praised graphics, animation and sound of the game. On the other hand Zzap!64 reviewers found the Commodore 64 version awful and boring and gave it an overall rating of 25%.

Commodore User gave the game a rating of 4/10.
