= Blue Max =

Blue Max is an informal name of Pour le Mérite, a German military decoration from 1740 until the end of World War I.

Blue Max may also refer to:

- Blue Max (video game) (1983) and its sequel Blue Max 2001
- Blue Max: Aces of the Great War, a 1990 video game
- Blue Max (board game) (1983)
- The Blue Max, a 1966 film
- 2d Battalion, 20th Field Artillery (United States), known as "Blue Max" during the Vietnam War
- Blue Max, one of protagonists in the video game Sky Kid
- Blue Max, the band of American guitarist Howard Luedtke
- Blue Max, a fictional character from The Han Solo Adventures novels
