= Rudolf von Eschwege =

WWI flying ace (1895–1917)

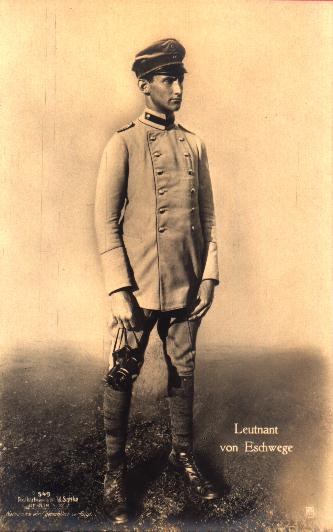
- Born: 25 February 1895; Bad Homburg vor der Höhe, Germany
- Died: 21 November 1917 (aged 22); Orljak, Macedonia (today Strymoniko, Serres, Greece)
- Military career
- Allegiance: Germany
- Branch: Cavalry; aviation
- Rank: Leutnant
- Nicknames: "Rudi" "The Eagle of the Aegean Sea" "The Richthofen of the Balkans"
- Units: 3rd Mounted Jaeger Regiment; Flieger-Abteilung 36; Flieger-Abteilung 66; Flieger-Abteilung 30
- Awards: Royal House Order of Hohenzollern; Iron Cross

Leutnant Rudolf von Eschwege (25 February 1895 – 21 November 1917) was a German World War I flying ace who was a fighter pilot operating on the Macedonian front. He was credited with twenty confirmed and six unconfirmed victories.

== Early life and cavalry service ==
Rudolf von Eschwege was born in Bad Homburg vor der Höhe, the German Empire, on 25 February 1895. He was orphaned while young. He went to military school after completing his secondary education at Freiburg. When World War I began, he was a nineteen-year-old cadet of medium height and slender build with blue eyes. Eschwege began his combat career as an ensign with the Jäger zu Pferde Regiment Nr. 3 (3rd Mounted Jäger Regiment) on the Western Front. On 9 and 10 August 1914, he fought in the Battle of Mulhouse; later, he also fought along the River Yser.

== Aviation service ==
After three months, he transferred to aviation. By February 1915, he began pilot training. He was not a natural pilot, but managed to qualify after crashing several times. He was then assigned to FA 36 (Flieger Abteilung/aerial reconnaissance unit) in July 1915. By July 1916, he was flying a Fokker Eindecker as a fighter escort to the unit's two-seaters. He served there until autumn of 1916, when he was commissioned an officer and transferred to the Macedonian Front.

There, on the fringes of the great war, a polyglot air force of Turks, Germans, and Bulgarians battled a vastly numerically superior French and Franco-Serbian foe. Eschwege was assigned to another recon unit, FA 66. His brief was to patrol a 99 mile (160 km) long front and guard the Bulgarian 10th Aegean Division against enemy air activities. There were a total of three German reconnaissance units in the theater, but he was the sole German fighter pilot. Opposed to him were two Royal Naval Air Service Wings, Nos. 2 and 3; two Royal Flying Corps squadrons, Nos. 17 and 24; as well as about 160 French and Serbian airplanes, equivalent to another ten squadrons. On 25 October 1916, piloting a Fokker Eindekker, he put in his first claim for an aerial victory when he "splashed" a Farman, but it went unconfirmed because the Bulgarian witnesses at a ground observation post had been transferred. His next two, on 19 November and 27 December, were his first credited victories. The Bulgarian infantry began to refer to him as "The Eagle of the Aegean Sea".

Eschwege began 1917 with a new unit, FA 30; he also began it, on 9 January, with another victory when he downed a Royal Aircraft Factory B.E.12 at his home airfield at Drama, Greece. For his next victory on 18 February, he took on British ace Captain Gilbert W. M. Green and his wingman, forcing down and capturing Lieutenant J. C. F. Owen when Green's gun jammed. The following day, a British plane dropped a query about Owen's well-being, to which the Germans replied. This sense of chivalry was manifested in a different way after von Eschwege's next victory of 22 March, when he visited his latest victims, a wounded pilot and observer, in the field hospital, bearing them gifts of cigarettes, chocolate, and books.

About this time, von Eschwege managed to upgrade to an Albatros D.III fighter, which he would fly to the end. It was while flying this plane that he was wounded during May, by the gunner in a British two-seater. Disregarding his wounded right arm and his plane's punctured fuel tank, he pressed home a successful attack and returned home to make a dead-stick landing. Nor was this wound his only drawback; he fell ill from malaria in early September.

== Death in action ==
By the beginning of October, von Eschwege had run his score to sixteen victories. He then began to choose British observation balloons for his targets. He managed to down two of them during October and November, plus a Sopwith 1 1/2 Strutter that tried to defend one of them. On 21 November, he attacked a balloon that had risen to the unusually high altitude of 2,500 feet. As he laced it with machine gun fire, it exploded and knocked him out of the air. The balloon had been fitted with a dummy observer and 500 pounds of high explosives; the booby trap was command detonated to kill von Eschwege. His death quashed his pending award of the Pour le Mérite. as the famed Blue Max could not be awarded posthumously.

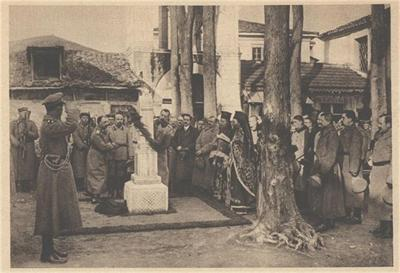
1917 dedication of monument in Drama to Rudolph von Eschwege.

Rudolf von Eschwege's coffin was carried to his grave by six British aviators, and he was buried with full military honors. Some days after the funeral, a British plane dropped a message on the German's home airfield. It read: "To the Bulgarian-German Flying Corps in Drama. The officers of the Royal Flying Corps regret to announce that Lt. von Eschwege was killed while attacking the captive balloon. His personal belongings will be dropped over the lines some time during the next few days." When the parcel was dropped, it contained a photo of his funeral packed along with his personal items. In turn, the Germans dropped a flag and a wreath for von Eschwege's grave. The Bulgarians later built a monument to him.

== Honors and awards ==
- Knight's Cross with Swords Second Class of the Order of the Zahringer Lion: 20 June 1915
- Bulgarian Order of Bravery 4th Class: 4 April 1917
- Bulgarian Order of Bravery 1st Class: post 4 April 1917
- Knight's Cross of Military Order of St. Henry: 8 July 1917
