= Claim jumper =

Claim jumper may refer to:

- A dishonest miner who violates another's land claim
- Claim Jumper, a restaurant chain
- Claim Jumper (NASCAR), a driver who participates in multiple series
- Claim Jumper (video game), a 1982 video game
