= Cathryn Mataga =

American video game programmer

- Born: William Mataga
- Known for: Shamus; Founder of Junglevision

Cathryn Mataga (born William Mataga) is a game programmer and founder of independent video game company Junglevision. Under the name William, she wrote Atari 8-bit computer games for Synapse Software in the early to mid 1980s, including Shamus, a flip-screen shooter.

== Career ==
Mataga designed the game Shamus in 1982, credited under the name William for the Atari 8-bit computers. Much of the game's appeal was said to come from Mataga's sense of humor, such as creating a "grand rendition" of the Alfred Hitchcock theme song in the game's introduction. Mataga followed it with a sequel Shamus: Case II and scrolling shooter Zeppelin.

Steve Hales of Synapse Software, in an interview for the book Halcyon Days, states that he and Mataga convinced company founder Ihor Wolosenko to get the company into interactive fiction.

Mataga developed an interactive fiction programming language known as BtZ (Better than Zork) for Broderbund, in the early 1980s. Mataga worked with Hales and poet Robert Pinsky on the interactive fiction game Mindwheel (1984).

Mataga was one of the programmers working at Stormfront Studios on the original Neverwinter Nights MMORPG. Don Daglow credits Mataga as one of the programmers who proved Daglow's assertion that he could make Neverwinter Nights a success.

== Games ==
- Shamus (1982), Synapse Software
- Shamus: Case II (1983), Synapse Software
- Zeppelin (1983), Synapse Software
- Mindwheel (1984), Broderbund Software
- Essex (1985), Broderbund
- Brimstone (1985), Broderbund
- Breakers (1986), Broderbund
- Neverwinter Nights (1991), Strategic Simulations
- Gateway to the Savage Frontier (1991), Strategic Simulations
- Treasures of the Savage Frontier (1992), Strategic Simulations
- Stronghold (1993), Strategic Simulations
- Dark Sun Online: Crimson Sands (1996), Strategic Simulations
- Rampage 2: Universal Tour (1999), Midway Games
- X-Men: Reign of Apocalypse (2001), Activision
- Spyro: Season of Ice (2001), Universal Interactive
- Rayman (2001), Ubi Soft
- Dragon's Lair (2001), Capcom
- Grand Theft Auto Advance (2004), Rockstar Games
- Spider-Man 2 (2004), Activision
- Rayman: 10th Anniversary (2005), Ubisoft
