= Atarisoft =

Brand name by Atari, Inc.

Typical Atarisoft packaging. The predominantly red cover corresponds to the Apple II.

Atarisoft was a brand name used by Atari, Inc. in 1983 and 1984 to publish video games for non-Atari home computers and consoles. Each platform had a specific color for its game packages: video games sold for the Commodore 64 were in green boxes, games for the TI-99/4A in yellow, the IBM PC in blue, and so on.

Atarisoft was so successful during the Christmas 1983 shopping season that the company released games for the discontinued TI-99/4A. By 1984 a rumor stated that Atari planned to discontinue hardware and only sell software. Despite being in existence for less than two years, Atarisoft had a huge video game library with dozens of game versions released. Almost all Atarisoft releases were produced by third-party developers, as Atari only developed for their own systems.

The Atarisoft label did not bear Atari's recognizable "Fuji" logo nor the official logos of the games, rather, the game names were written in a different typeface.

The Atarisoft brand as used by Atari, Inc. was discontinued shortly after Warner Communications sold Atari's consumer division to Jack Tramiel in 1984. Many additional games were in production at the time. Most went unreleased although a few were eventually released by other companies. Some games were complete, such as IBM PC port of Joust, but never published.

The new Atari Corporation initially used the Atarisoft brand. Several Atari 8-bit computer titles (both game and non-game) were published by Atari UK and Atari France using the Atarisoft label in 1985. Atari did not use the Atarisoft label again after 1985.

== Cross-platform games ==
=== Released ===
These were published during 1983–84. Most were released by Atari, Inc., but some of these were released by Atari Corporation later in 1984.

- Battlezone (Apple II, C64, VIC-20, IBM PC)
- Centipede (Apple II, ColecoVision, C64, VIC-20, IBM PC, Intellivision, TI-99/4A)
- Crystal Castles (Apple II, C64)
- Defender (Apple II, ColecoVision, C64, VIC-20, IBM PC, TI-99/4A, Intellivision)
- Dig Dug (Apple II, C64, VIC-20, IBM PC, TI-99/4A)
- Donkey Kong (Apple II, C64, VIC-20, IBM PC, TI-99/4A)
- Galaxian (Apple II, ColecoVision, C64, VIC-20, IBM PC, ZX Spectrum)
- Gremlins (Apple II, C64, IBM PC)
- Joust (Apple II)
- Jungle Hunt (Apple II, ColecoVision, C64, VIC-20, IBM PC, TI-99/4A)
- Moon Patrol (Apple II, C64, VIC-20, IBM PC, TI-99/4A)
- Ms. Pac-Man (Apple II, C64, VIC-20, IBM PC, TI-99/4A, ZX Spectrum)
- Pac-Man (Apple II, C64, VIC-20, IBM PC, Intellivision, TI-99/4A, ZX Spectrum)
- Picnic Paranoia (TI-99/4A)
- Pole Position (BBC Micro, C64, VIC-20, TI-99/4A, ZX Spectrum)
- Protector II (TI-99/4A)
- Robotron: 2084 (Apple II, BBC Micro/Acorn Electron, C64, VIC-20, IBM PC)
- Shamus (TI-99/4A)
- Stargate (Apple II, IBM PC)
- Track & Field (Apple II, C64)

=== Unreleased ===
Promoted, partially developed, or fully completed games, but Atari did not publish them.

- Asteroids Deluxe (BBC Micro)
- Battlezone (BBC Micro/Acorn Electron)
- Centipede (IBM PCjr)
- Crystal Castles (IBM PC)
- Dig Dug (BBC Micro/Acorn Electron, ColecoVision, Intellivision, ZX Spectrum)
- Donkey Kong (BBC Micro/Acorn Electron, IBM PCjr, ZX Spectrum)
- Donkey Kong Jr. (BBC Micro)
- Galaxian (Intellivision)
- Joust (BBC Micro, ColecoVision, C64, Intellivision, VIC-20, TI-99/4A, IBM PC)
- Jungle Hunt (Intellivision)
- Mario Bros. (Apple II, C64, VIC-20, IBM PC, TI-99/4A)
- Missile Command (Apple II, ColecoVision, C64, VIC-20, IBM PC, Intellivision, TI-99/4A)
- Moon Patrol (ColecoVision, IBM PCjr, ZX Spectrum)
- Ms. Pac-Man (BBC Micro/Acorn Electron, ColecoVision, IBM PCjr, Intellivision)
- Pac-Man (ColecoVision)
- Pole Position (Apple II, Intellivision)
- Robotron: 2084 (TI-99/4A, ZX Spectrum)
- Sinistar (Acorn Electron, BBC Micro) later published as DeathStar by Superior Software
- Stargate (C64,VIC-20, TI-99/4A)
- Super Storm (TI-99/4A) port of Slime
- Track & Field (IBM PC)
- Typo Attack (Apple II, C64, VIC-20, IBM PC, IBM PCjr)
- Vanguard (Apple II, C64, VIC-20, IBM PC, Intellivision, TI-99/4A)

== Releases by Atari UK ==
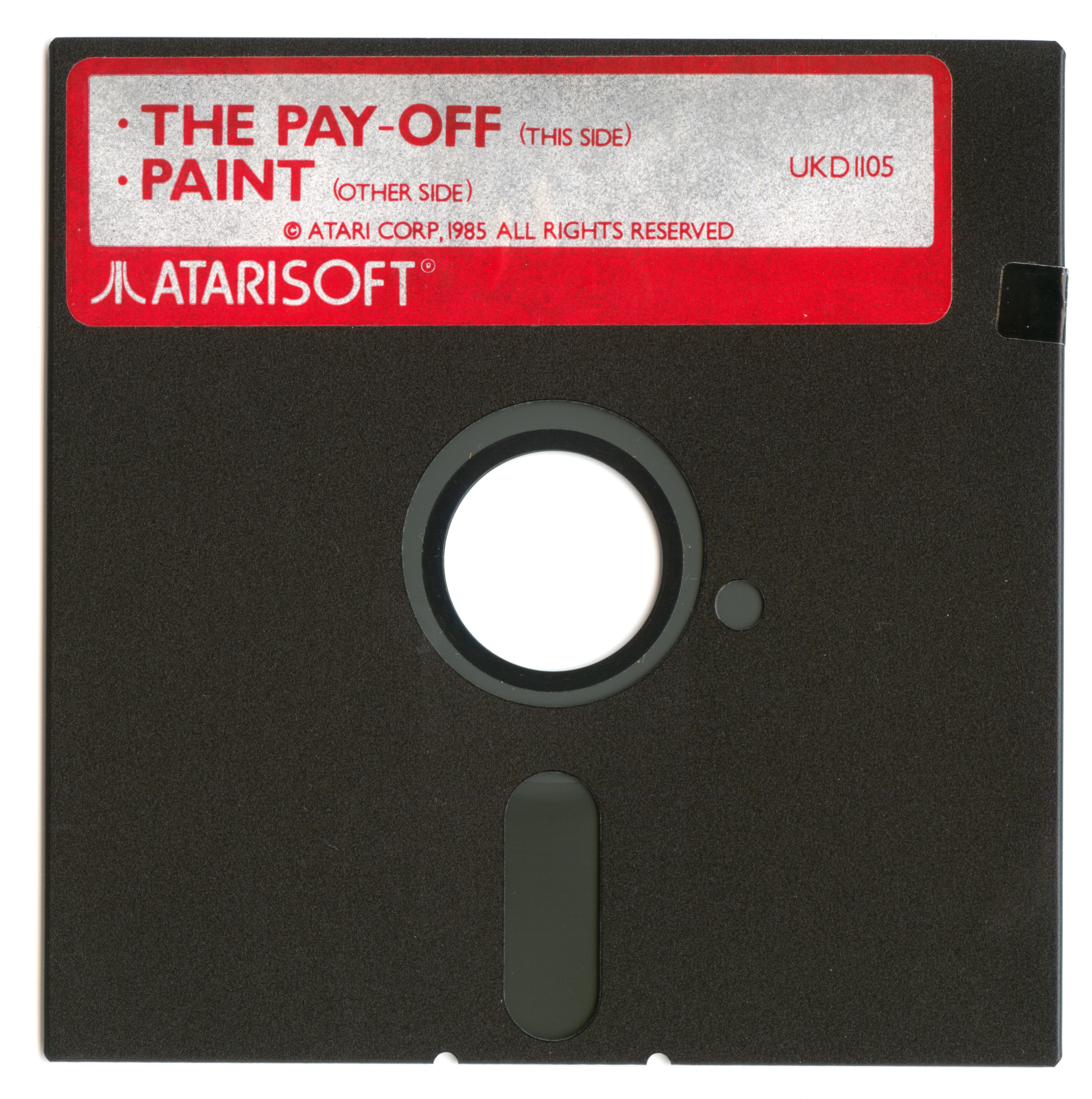
Atarisoft-branded "Paint" / "The Pay-Off" floppy disk supplied as part of "Software Pack" in computer bundle

All released in 1985:

- Chess (Atari 8-bit)
- Eastern Front (1941) (Atari 8-bit)
- European Countries and Capitals (Atari 8-bit)
- An Invitation to Programming (Atari 8-bit)
- The Lone Raider (Atari 8-bit)
- Software Pack (The Home Filing Manager and The Pay-Off / Paint) (Atari 8-bit)

== Releases by Atari France ==
All released in 1985:

- Cameléon (Atari 8-bit)
- Énigme du triangle (Atari 8-bit)
- Nostradamus (Atari 8-bit)
- Promoteur (Atari 8-bit)
