= Shadow World =

Shadow World may refer to:

- Shadow World (role playing game), a high-fantasy campaign setting first published in 1987
- Shadow World (video game), a 1983 action game for Atari 8-bit computers
- The Shadow World: Inside the Global Arms Trade, a 2011 book by Andrew Feinstein
  - Shadow World (film), a 2016 documentary film based on the book
- Shadow World (album), 2015, by Wolfheart
