= Dimension X =

Dimension X may refer to:

- Dimension X (radio program), a 1950–1951 American radio drama
- Dimension X (video game), a 1984 Atari 8-bit computer game from Synapse Software
- Dimension X (Teenage Mutant Ninja Turtles), a location in the Teenage Mutant Ninja Turtles franchise
