= Indy 500 (1977 video game) =

1977 video game

- Developer: Atari, Inc.
- Publishers: Atari, Inc.
- Designers: Carla Meninsky; Ed Riddle
- Programmer: Ed Riddle
- Platform: Atari 2600
- Release: NA: September 11, 1977
- Genre: Racing
- Modes: Single-player, multiplayer

Indy 500 is a 1977 racing video game developed by Atari, Inc. for its Video Computer System (later known as the Atari 2600). It is themed around the Indianapolis 500, and is based on Atari's earlier 8-player arcade game, Indy 800.

Indy 500 was one of the nine launch titles offered when the Atari 2600 went on sale in September 1977. Sears Tele-Games later re-released it as Race. Included with each game was a set of two driving controllers, which were identical in appearance to the 2600 paddle controller but could rotate indefinitely in either direction, among other differences. The game was once again renamed to Race 500 in the 2022 compilation, Atari 50.

== Gameplay ==
Both cars ready to race in the standard mode (the "Grand Prix" track)

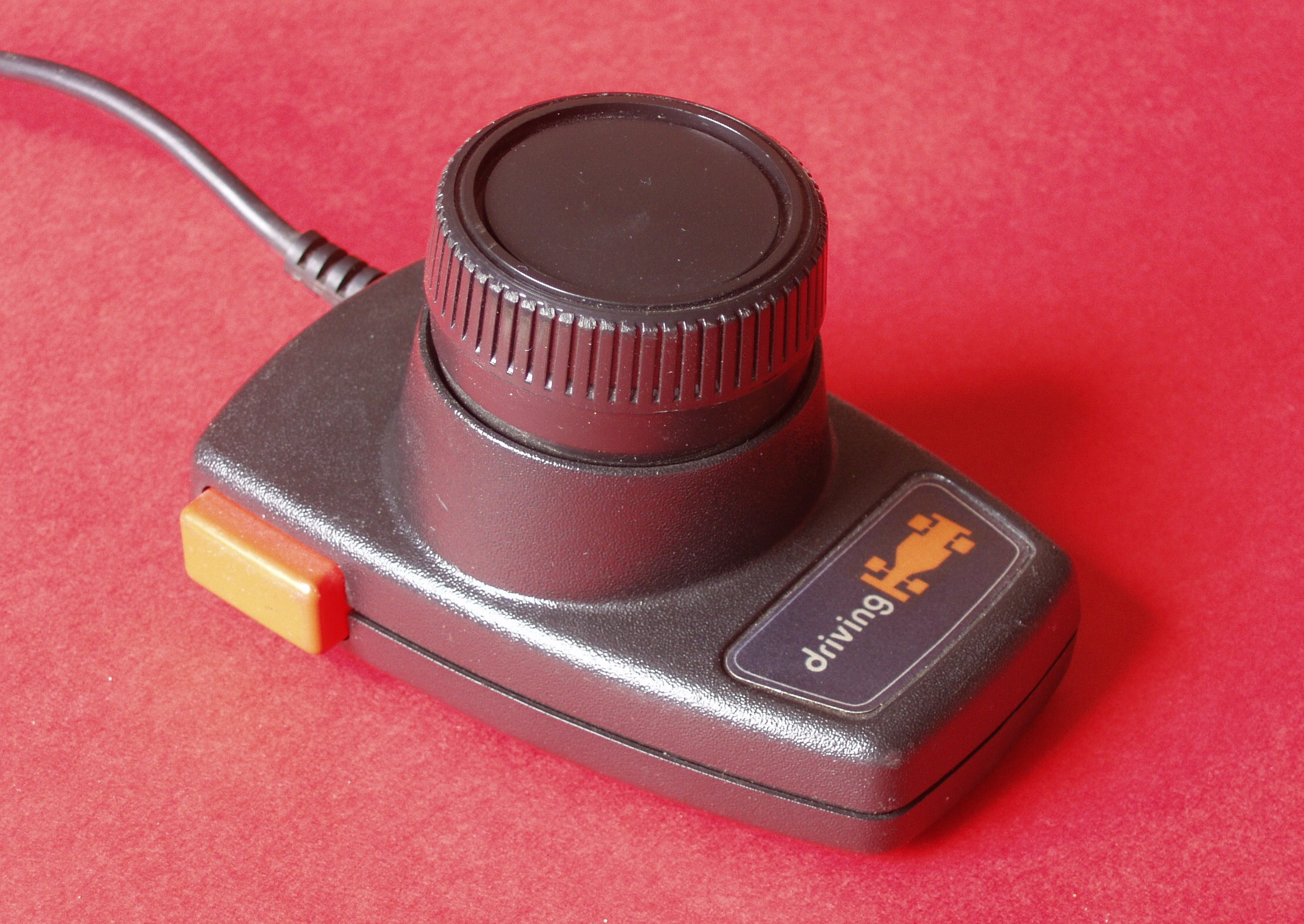
A driving controller

This cartridge has fourteen game selections, which comprise variations on four different games. Variations include two tracks for each game, and all except "Tag" had two-player (lap- or score-based) and one-player (time-based) variants.

- Race Car: One player can race against the clock to complete as many laps as they can in 60 seconds, or two players compete to finish 25 laps. Two courses are featured: "Grand Prix", shaped like an open figure-of-eight, with wide lanes, and "Devil's Elbow", with narrower lanes and tighter curves.
- Crash n' Score: The goal in this game is to drive into a white square randomly placed on the screen; this will earn points, and the square will then be randomly placed elsewhere. In two-player versions, players compete for the most hits, while in one-player versions, the player tries to hit the square as many times as they can within 60 seconds. Instead of a conventional racetrack, the screen is a field with either two widely spaced parallel vertical barriers and with two "tunnels" wrapping around from the top to the bottom of the screen ("Crash n' Score I") or six car-sized blocks instead of a track, and barriers only on the right and left sides of the screen; driving vertically off the screen wraps around to the opposite side ("Crash n' Score II").
- Tag: Similar to "Crash n' Score", except that one of the players is the target, and points are scored not on a per-hit basis but on a time basis, the "target" car (which is blinking) getting one point per second as long as it avoids being hit by the other car. The non-blinking car gains no points, and therefore must "tag" the blinking car, after which the roles of the players are reversed. This is only available as a two-player game. Two tracks are offered: "Barrier Chase" and "Motor Hunt" (the same as "Crash n' Score I" and "Crash n' Score II", respectively).
- Ice Race: This is much like "Race Car", except with slippery physics that affects both slowing down and changing direction. Two tracks are available: "Ice Sprint", a simple oval-type track; and "Ice Rally", which is the same as "Grand Prix".

== Reception ==
Retrospective reviews

Review scores
Publication	Score
AllGame	4/5
The Complete Guide to Electronic Games	4/5

In his book The Complete Guide to Electronic Games (1981), author Howard Blumenthal said that Atari's first attempt at a racing game was still their best with nearly all the variations of the game being worth playing. Brett Alan Weiss of online video game database Allgame wrote that it was among the better launch titles for the Atari VCS, with its highly competitive two-player gameplay and its simple and effective graphics and sound effects.

== See also ==
- List of Atari 2600 games
- Dodge 'Em (1980)
- Math Gran Prix (1982)
