= Electrician (disambiguation) =

An electrician is a tradesperson specializing in electrical wiring.

Electrician may also refer to:

- Electrician (theatre), a theatre worker that handles various aspects of lighting
- Electrician (video game), a 1984 platform game for the Atari
- The Electrician, a defunct scientific journal
- "The Electrician" (song), a 1978 song by Scott Walker
- An executioner who executes people using the electric chair
- "The Electrician", a character in the Firesign Theatre's album The Tale of the Giant Rat of Sumatra
- Mohiyedine Sharif, a bombmaker called "the Electrician"
