= Carla Meninsky =

Lawyer and Atari 2600 video game designer and programmer

- Occupations: Video game designer, programmer, lawyer
- Years active: 1977–present
- Employer(s): Atari, Inc. Electronic Arts
- Known for: Indy 500, Dodge 'Em

Carla Meninsky is a former video game designer and programmer active during the early years of the Atari VCS. Along with Carol Shaw (creator of 3-D Tic-Tac-Toe and River Raid), Meninsky was one of three female programmers at Atari, Inc. to develop video game cartridges. She later became an intellectual property lawyer.

== Background ==
Meninsky's mother was a programmer and Carla learned programming in high school, but she switched from mathematics to neuropsychology and brain modelling at Stanford University. Given her artistic bent, Meninsky was particularly interested in vision and eventually veered back toward programming and a lifelong dream of creating animation tools.

She began her college career at Stanford studying math but eventually switched to psychology because it sounded more exciting. She learned basic Fortran in high school from her mother, who was a programmer, and through this built an interest in computer animation.

== Atari, Inc. ==
Meninsky joined Atari after graduating from Stanford University with a degree in psychology. She noted gaming development was a field with mostly electrical engineering majors, "some of the most intelligent people I have ever worked with and not your typical engineering nerd type, either", and there was a stigma regarding both gaming itself and women working in it: "The other two women in the field at the time were constantly hearing, 'Why don't you get a real job?' from their friends and spouses. For a woman with an advanced degree, it was hard to justify why you were spending your life contributing to the delinquency of minors."

For the Atari 2600 she wrote the racing games Indy 500 and Dodge 'Em (similar to the 1979 Head On coin-op from Sega), a 1981 port of Atari's Warlords, and the 2600 version of Star Raiders (originally designed by Doug Neubauer for the Atari 8-bit computers). She later worked on a port of Tempest that was never released, but prototypes exist.

== Law practice ==
Meninsky worked for Electronic Arts (EA) and other game publishers and eventually started her own successful contract programming company. In the course of writing contracts and seeing intellectual property rights being ignored by some companies, she became interested in intellectual property law. Meninsky graduated from George Washington University Law School and now practices intellectual property law. As an EPIC Public Interest Opportunities Program Fellow, Meninsky testified before the U.S. Senate in 2002.

== Publications ==
Meninsky, Carla. "Locked Out: The New Hazards of Reverse Engineering". The John Marshall Journal of Computer & Information Law Vol. XXI Summer 2003 No. 4.
