= Daniel E. Atkins =

American computer scientist

- Citizenship: United States
- Education: University of Illinois at Urbana-Champaign, Bucknell University
- Known for: Parallel computer architecture, Collaboratory for Research on Electronic Work, Office of Cyberinfrastructure
- Awards: Nina W. Mathesson Award, Computerworld Smithsonian Award, Paul Evan Peters Award
- Scientific career
- Fields: Computer science, cyberlearning, computer architecture, community informatics
- Workplaces: University of Michigan, College of Engineering, School of Information

Daniel E. Atkins III is an American computer scientist, electrical engineer, and academic administrator. He is emeritus W. K. Kellogg Professor of Information at the University of Michigan School of Information and professor emeritus of electrical engineering and computer science at the University of Michigan College of Engineering.

Atkins was the founding dean of the University of Michigan School of Information (1992–1998) and, from 2006 to 2008, the inaugural director of the National Science Foundation's Office of Cyberinfrastructure. He chaired the NSF Blue-Ribbon Advisory Panel on Cyberinfrastructure, whose 2003 report led to the creation of that office. He was elected to the National Academy of Engineering in 2014 for leadership in development of radix algorithms and cybertechnical collaborative systems.

== Early life and education ==
Atkins received a Bachelor of Science in electrical engineering ''magna cum laude'' from Bucknell University in 1965. He then attended the University of Illinois Urbana-Champaign, where he earned a Master of Science in electrical engineering in 1967 and a PhD in computer science in 1970. His doctoral research concerned computer arithmetic and digital systems design, in particular higher-radix division methods. In 1970 Atkins served as a captain in the United States Army Reserve, attending the Signal Officer Basic Course at Fort Gordon, Georgia.

== Career ==
=== University of Michigan ===
Atkins joined the University of Michigan faculty in 1971 as an assistant professor of electrical engineering and computer science. In 1981 he became associate dean for research and graduate studies in the College of Engineering, where he helped lead the establishment of the college's CAEN workstation computing labs. He served as interim dean of the college from 1989 to 1991, and chaired the committee that developed one of the earliest computer engineering undergraduate degree programs.

In 1992 Atkins became dean of the School of Information and Library Studies, with a mandate to transform it into a broader school; in 1994 the university's Board of Regents re-chartered it as the School of Information, with initial specializations in human–computer interaction; information economics, management, and policy; knowledge management; and information and library services. He held the deanship until September 1998. The University of Michigan describes the school under his leadership as one of the first modern information schools (iSchools). With support from the W. K. Kellogg Foundation, he also formed and directed the Alliance for Community Technology. He was named the school's first endowed professor, the Kellogg Professor in Community Information, a chair established through a $2 million gift from the foundation.

=== National Science Foundation ===
Atkins chaired the NSF Blue-Ribbon Advisory Panel on Cyberinfrastructure. The panel's January 2003 report, ''Revolutionizing Science and Engineering Through Cyberinfrastructure'' (commonly called the "Atkins Report"), recommended that NSF form a program in cyberinfrastructure-enhanced science and engineering research. The report led to the establishment of the NSF Office of Cyberinfrastructure (OCI).

In February 2006 NSF named Atkins the first director of the newly created OCI, effective June 2006; the office had a fiscal year 2006 budget of $127million. He held the post until 2008.

=== Research administration and emeritus service ===
After returning from NSF, Atkins served from 2008 to 2012 as the University of Michigan's associate vice president for research cyberinfrastructure and as chair of the university's IT Governance Council. He became emeritus in 2015 and has continued to advise college leaders; the National Academies selected him to chair a multi-academy committee on advanced and automated workflows for scientific research. In 2012 the university held a symposium in his honor, ''Learning and Discovery in the Connected Age''.

== Research ==
=== Computer architecture ===
Atkins's early research addressed computer architecture, computer arithmetic, and parallel computing. He contributed to the theory of higher-radix and redundant-encoding arithmetic algorithms and took part in the design and construction of seven experimental machines, including some of the earliest parallel computers.

=== Medical computing ===
Atkins collaborated with the Mayo Clinic on the development of high-speed processors for computed tomography.

=== Digital libraries and collaboratories ===
Atkins directed the University of Michigan's EXPRES (Experimental Research in Electronic Submission) project. NSF funded EXPRES in 1986, with awards to the University of Michigan and Carnegie Mellon University, to explore electronic submission of research proposals. NSF later developed its FastLane system, on whose design Atkins served as a consultant.

He led workshops that helped define the NSF Digital Library Initiative and was project director of the University of Michigan Digital Library Project (1992–1997). He also helped pilot the Mellon Foundation's JSTOR project (1992–1995).

Atkins directed research on collaboratories, networked systems that let geographically dispersed scientists work together. This included the Upper Atmospheric Research Collaboratory and its successor, the Space Physics and Aeronomy Research Collaboratory (SPARC), of which he was project director from 1998 to 2001. The University of Michigan describes the work as pioneering the first virtual laboratory, or collaboratory.

=== Community informatics ===
In his later work Atkins turned to community informatics and the social and technical architecture of distributed knowledge communities. Projects under the Alliance for Community Technology included a digital library test bed with tribal colleges and cross-national collaborative courses with partners in South Africa and elsewhere. In 2012 he wrote on the stewardship of research data in the age of big data.

== Selected publications ==
- Duderstadt, James J.; Atkins, Daniel E.; Van Houweling, Douglas (2002). Higher Education in the Digital Age: Technology Issues and Strategies for American Colleges and Universities.ISBN 1573565202

== Awards and honors ==
- 1976, 1992 – University of Michigan Distinguished Service Award.
- 1993 – Nina W. Matheson Award, for contributions to medical informatics.
- 1998 – Computerworld Smithsonian Award, for innovation in use of the web for science.
- 2008 – Paul Evan Peters Award, from the Coalition for Networked Information, the Association of Research Libraries, and Educause.
- 2014 – Elected member, National Academy of Engineering.
- 2019 – Fellow, American Association for the Advancement of Science.
- 2022 – Edward Law Emeritus Outstanding Service Award (2021–22), University of Michigan College of Engineering.

== Personal life ==
Atkins is married to Monica Atkins, and they have two children. The Dan and Monica Atkins Scholarship Fund was started in their name to provide tuition support to students.
