= Fastlane =

Fastlane or fast lane or Fast Lane may refer to:

- Fast Lane (video game), a 1987 Konami arcade game
- WWE Fastlane, a professional wrestling event
  - Fastlane (2015)
  - Fastlane (2016)
  - Fastlane (2017)
  - Fastlane (2018)
  - Fastlane (2019)
  - Fastlane (2021)
  - Fastlane (2023)

== Transportation and technology ==
- Fast Lane (electronic toll collection), a branding used for the E-ZPass system in Massachusetts from 1998 to 2012
- Fast Lane (Six Flags), a fast pass system at Six Flags amusement parks
- Nokia Fastlane, a user interface from Nokia
- Passing lane or fast lane, a lane on a multi-lane highway or motorway closest to the center of the road
- FastLane Technologies, a company acquired in 2001 by Quest Software
- Fastlane, a blog by Bob Lutz of General Motors

== Music ==
- Fastlane (band), a British rock band
- "Fastlane" (song), a 2005 song by Esthero
- "Fast Lane" (Bad Meets Evil song), 2011
- "Fast Lane" (Bilal song), 2001
- "Fastlane", a song by Nico Santos
- "Fast Lane", a song by E-40 from the 2012 album The Block Brochure: Welcome to the Soil 1
- "Fastlane", a song by Lindsay Lohan from the 2005 album A Little More Personal (Raw)
- "Fast Lane", a song by Megadeth from the 2011 album Thirteen
- "Fast Lane", a song by Urban Dance Squad from the 1990 album Mental Floss for the Globe
- "Fast Lane", a song by The Sugarhill Gang from the 1984 album Livin' in the Fast Lane
- "Fastlane", a song by MF Doom from the 2003 album Take Me To Your Leader

== Television ==
- The Fast Lane, a 1985–1987 Australia comedy crime series
- Fastlane (TV series), a 2002–2003 American action/crime drama series
- "Fast Lane" (The Flash), a 2016 episode
- "Fast Lane" (The Incredible Hulk), a 1981 episode

== See also ==
- Faslane (disambiguation)
- Local–express lanes, an arrangement of roadways within a major highway that allows drivers to choose lanes with fewer interchanges
