= Coders at Work =

2009 book by Peter Seibel

Coders at Work: Reflections on the Craft of Programming
- Author: Peter Seibel
- Subject: Software Development
- Publisher: Apress
- Publication date: September 16, 2009
- ISBN: 1-4302-1948-3

Coders at Work: Reflections on the Craft of Programming (ISBN 1-430-21948-3) is a 2009 book by Peter Seibel with interviews of 15 programmers. The primary topics in these interviews include how the interviewees learned programming, how they debug code, their favorite languages and tools, their opinions on literate programming, proofs, and code reading.

== Interviewees ==
1. Jamie Zawinski
2. Brad Fitzpatrick
3. Douglas Crockford
4. Brendan Eich
5. Joshua Bloch
6. Joe Armstrong
7. Simon Peyton Jones
8. Peter Norvig
9. Guy Steele
10. Dan Ingalls
11. L. Peter Deutsch
12. Ken Thompson
13. Fran Allen
14. Bernie Cosell
15. Donald Knuth

== See also ==
- Halcyon Days
