= Dodge Racer =

1981 video game

- Cover art by Tim Boxell
- Developer: Synapse Software
- Publisher: Synapse Software
- Designer: Rob Re
- Platform: Atari 8-bit
- Release: 1981
- Genre: Maze
- Modes: Single-player, multiplayer

Dodge Racer (also shown in the manual as Dodge-Racer and DodgeRacer) is a maze video game programmed by Rob Re for Atari 8-bit computers and published by Synapse Software in 1981. It is a clone of the 1979 arcade video game Head On, where the player drives around a rectangular track, divided into lanes, collecting dots and avoiding collisions. Dodge Racer was the second release from Synapse and the company's first game.

== Gameplay ==
A player-controlled car and enemy car move in opposite directions through a course of concentric rectangles. When a car passes through gaps in each of the four cardinal directions, it can change lanes. The goal is to collect all the dots without crashing into the other vehicle.

Up to four players can take turns or there's a there's a mode for two players to alternate between controlling the player and enemy car. There are options for whether the level fully resets after a crash, adding a second enemy car starting in round 3, having two cars from the start of the game, and enabling an automatic speed increase partway through a round.

The Dodge Racer track has six lanes, while Head On has five and Dodge 'Em for the Atari VCS has four.

== Development ==
Synapse Software co-founders Ihor Wolosenko and Ken Grant met Rob Re at an Atari computer user group. They had already been working on the database File Manager 800 and asked Re if they could sell Dodge Racer. It became the second release from Synapse, following File Manager 800, and the company's first game.

Dodge Racer is written in 6502 assembly language using a BASIC program for initialization. The Atari BASIC cartridge needs to be inserted on the Atari 400 and 800 computers.

== Reception ==
Book of Atari Software 1983 gave an overall letter grade of C: "It is an addicting game, although I think it is a bit too fast and frustrating for beginners. It has decent graphics, presents a challenge, and the price is right". ANALOG Computing reviewer Tony Messina echoed parts of that, labeling the game "frustratingly addictive" and giving an 8 out of 10 for graphics and sound. Bill Kunkel compared the game to another clone of Head On in the March 1982 issue of Electronic Games:

Though obviously inspired by Atari's Dodge 'Em, this version is clearly an improvement on its inspiration. By increasing the number of lanes to six, Dodge Racer greatly reduces the chance that the gamer will develop a system. Once the arcader has a pre-planned route that covers the entire field in the shortest possible time, it takes a lot out of programs of this type.
