= Protector (1981 video game) =

1981 video game

- Publishers: Crystalware; Synapse Software; HesWare
- Designer: John Bell
- Programmers: Atari 8-bit Mike Potter; VIC-20; Alick Dziabczenko
- Platforms: Atari 8-bit, VIC-20
- Release: 1981: Atari 8-bit 1983: VIC-20
- Genre: Scrolling shooter
- Mode: Single-player

Protector is a 1981 scrolling shooter for Atari 8-bit computers programmed by Mike Potter and distributed first by Crystalware and then Synapse Software. A VIC-20 port was published by HesWare in 1983.

The player attempts to rescue the citizens of a city from an impending volcanic explosion. The design of the game is inspired by Defender from Williams Electronics, though not a direct clone. The sequel, Protector II, has similar gameplay but is more advanced graphically.

== Gameplay ==
Protector near the start of the game. The player's spaceship has picked up a citizen and is in the process of carrying them to New Hope, offscreen to the right.

The gameplay of Protector is inspired by Defender, with the player controlling a rocket fighter of similar design and the general goal being to pick up civilians from the ground to protect them from the enemy. The game is less action-oriented, however, and contains a more strategic component.

Protector has two stages. In the first, the player flies the "Needlefighter" over a city that is under attack by an indestructible enemy spaceship. The spaceship flies over the city, beaming its citizens up one at a time and then flying to a nearby volcano to drop them in. To save them from this threat, the player must fly over each of the people to pick them up, then carries them past the volcano to the City of New Hope.

When all of the survivors have been moved to New Hope, the first stage of the game ends. This causes the enemy spacecraft to disappear. However, this also causes the volcano to erupt. Its lava encroaches on New Hope and destroys its buildings, along with anyone on them. The ending of the first stage also opens a passage protected by "laser gates". The player now ferries the people from New Hope through the laser-guarded gauntlet to the entrance of an underground fortress. When the last survivor is deposited in the entrance, the game ends.

The mission takes place on a single large side-scrolling map, several times wider than the physical display. Smooth scrolling is used to keep the player roughly centred as they fly. If the player's ship hits the ground, buildings or the enemy spacecraft, it tumbles to the ground before being pulled away by an ambulance. There are several levels with increasingly difficult enemies and terrain.

== Development ==
Potter started programming on the Atari 8-bit home computers in 1980, after graduating from high school. His first product was a set of four games, Imperial Walker, Nim, Gun Fight, and Auto Racer, sold on consignment at local computer stores. While visiting the Electronic Fantasy store in Cupertino, the manager Dave Stillings, mentioned he might want to get in contact with Crystalware in Gilroy.

Potter met with Crystalware's owners, John Bell and his wife Patty. Bell outlined a new game and gave Potter a $4,000 advance on its completion. This took seven sleepless nights, and after delivering it in May 1981, Potter delivered another eleven programs for Crystalware between May and October. That month Potter questioned his royalties, and in return received a letter firing him, but returning the rights to Protector. (Note: Years later a game with Bell and Potter's names surfaced with the Epyx label on it, Indiana Jones - Pyramids of Giza. It is assumed to be a game from the Crystalware era that was later sold to Epyx but never released.)

In November 1981, Potter met with Ihor Wolosenko of Synapse Software, which at that time was being run from Wolosenko's apartment in Berkley. Wolosenko took the time to test and debug the program before putting it back on the market. Its re-launch received much better reviews. Over the next year, Potter released five games for Synapse: Protector, Protector II, Chicken, Nautilus, and Shadow World.

== Reception ==
John Anderson reviewed the game for Computer Gaming World, and stated that "Protector represents a breakthrough of sorts. The music in the program is excellent, and remains constant throughout the game--with the result of adding much character to its play. When your ship is downed, an ambulance shoots out to drag you away. The overall result is humorous--at least until frustration sets in!"

Creative Computing Video & Arcade Games in 1983 stated that the Atari 8-bit version of Protector's "animation is mirror smooth", praising its horizontally scrolling graphics.
