= Passing lane =

Lane on a multi-lane highway or motorway closest to the median of the road

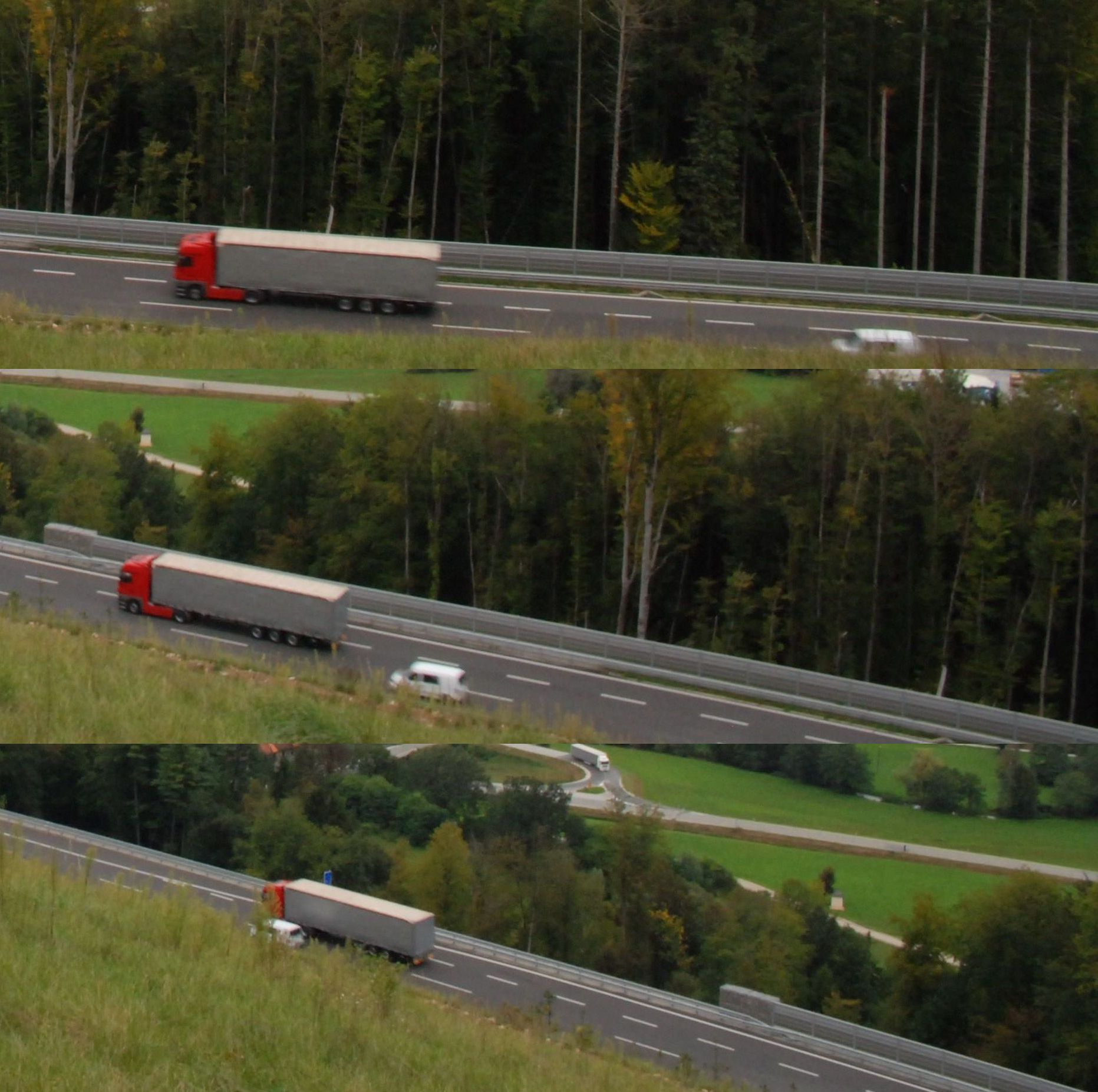
A car passes a slower moving truck, using a passing lane on the A2 motorway in Slovenia

A passing lane (North American English), overtaking lane (English outside North America) is a lane on a multi-lane highway or motorway closest to the median of the road (the central reservation) used for passing vehicles in other lanes. (North American usage also calls the higher-speed lane nearest the median the "inside lane" but in the United Kingdom this is the "outside lane".) Countries with right-hand traffic put the passing lane on the left; those with left-hand traffic put the passing lane on the right. Motorways typically have passing lanes along their entire length, but other roads might only have passing lanes for certain segments, depending on design specifications typically related to available space, funding, and traffic levels. A 2+1 road alternates the passing lane between directions every few kilometers/miles.

The passing lane is commonly referred to as the fast lane, and the lane closest to the shoulder the slow lane. Some jurisdictions, particularly on limited-access roads, ban passing-lane driving while not overtaking another vehicle; others merely require slower cars to yield to quicker traffic by shifting to slower lanes, or have no limitations.

On roads with only one lane in a given direction, overtaking is accomplished by briefly pulling into oncoming traffic. This is often prohibited by "no passing" signs and road markings on lengths of road where a hill or a curving road limit sight distances, and some jurisdictions ban this entirely. So-called suicide lanes provide a shared third center lane for passing in both directions, with the expectation that drivers will check for oncoming traffic before entering.

In modern traffic planning, passing lanes on freeways are usually designed for through/express traffic, while the lanes furthest from the median of the road have entry/exit ramps. However due to routing constraints, some freeways may have ramps exiting from the passing lane; these are known as "left exits" in North America.

== Misuse and common practice in the United States ==
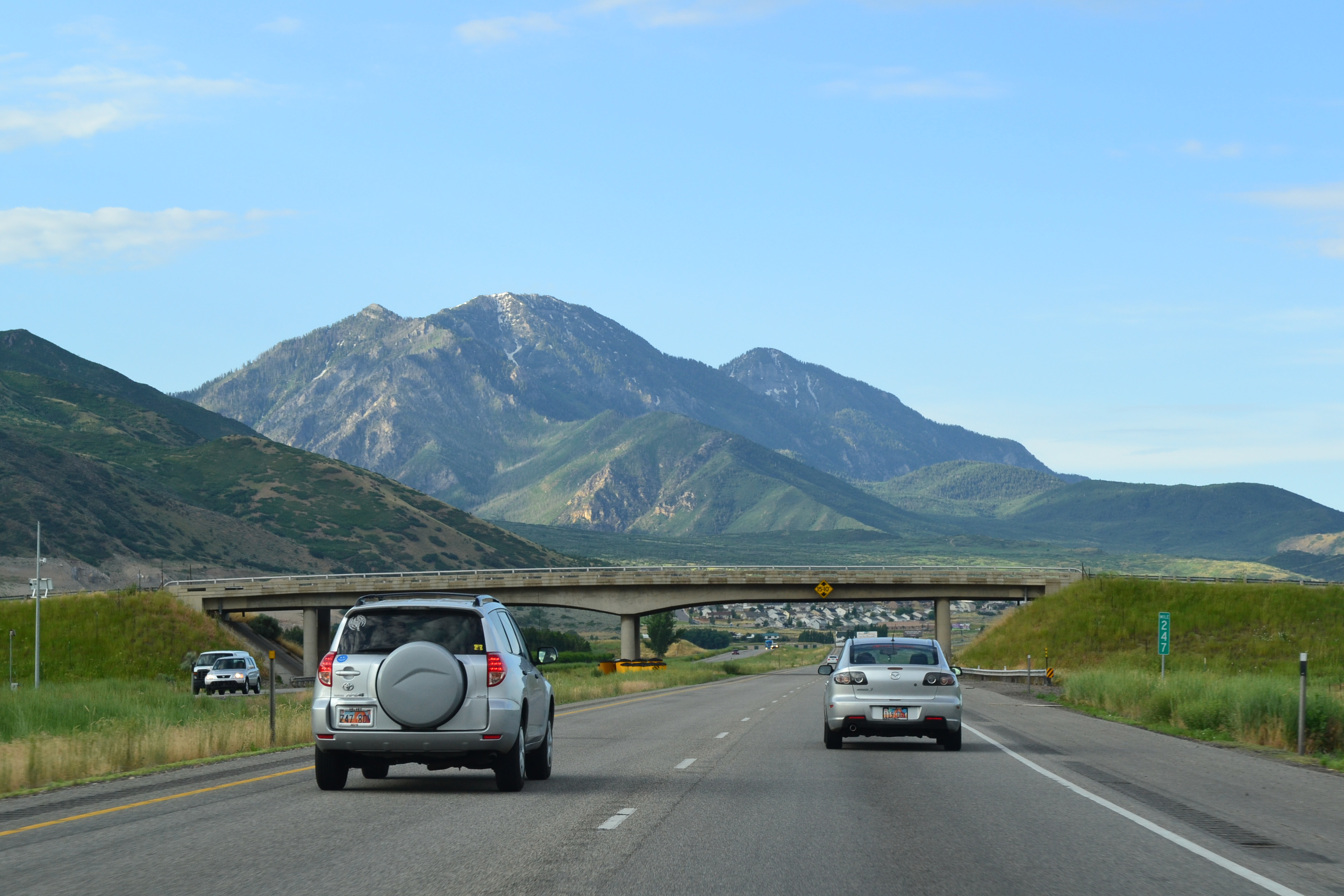
An SUV prepares to pass a slower moving car, using a passing lane in rural Utah

Common practice and most law on United States highways is that the left lane is reserved for passing and faster moving traffic, and that traffic using the left lane must yield to traffic wishing to overtake.

The United States Uniform Vehicle Code states:

Upon all roadways any vehicle proceeding at less than the normal speed of traffic at the time and place and under the conditions then existing shall be driven in the right-hand lane then available for traffic ...

It is also illegal in many states in the US to use the "far left" or passing lane on a major highway as a traveling lane (as opposed to passing), or to fail to yield to faster moving traffic that is attempting to overtake in that lane. For example, Colorado's "Left Lane Law" states:

A person shall not drive a motor vehicle in the passing lane of a highway if the speed-limit is sixty-five miles per hour or more unless such person is passing other motor-vehicles that are in a non-passing lane...

In some states, such as Maine, Massachusetts, Missouri, Montana, New Jersey, and Washington, the center lanes on highways with three or more lanes in each direction are also passing lanes. In those states, no matter how many lanes there are on the highway, drivers must not leave the right-hand lane unless they are overtaking slower vehicles, making a left turn or exit, or obeying a move over law.

California does not explicitly prohibit cruising in the left lane. However, it prohibits passing to the right and, similar to the states below, slow traffic must stay right.

In other states, such as Massachusetts, New Jersey, Illinois, Pennsylvania, and others, it is illegal to fail to yield to traffic that seeks to overtake in the left lane, or to create any other "obstruction" in the passing lane that hinders the flow of traffic. As a result, heavy trucks are often prohibited from using the passing lane.

The left lane is commonly referred to as the "fast lane", but that is not an accurate description of the lane's purpose. The left lane is the designated passing lane; however, vehicles in the left lane must obey the posted speed limits. A common problem arising from misuse of the left lane is speeding and tailgating. These actions create road rage and increase overall danger.

A driver hoping to pass a slow motorist in the "fast lane" can be stuck in an awkward situation. One strategy is to signal a lane change toward the center median. Another is to flash headlights. A third, which is dangerous and illegal, is to drive very close to the "fast lane" driver's bumper (this is known as tailgating).

Most commonly, motorists will attempt to overtake the outer car on the inner lane either to continue at a fast pace or to pass a car that is going too slowly in the passing lane. On high-capacity multilane freeways (three or more lanes per direction), many motorists often pass on the inner lane, largely in response to misuse of the "passing lane" by slower traffic.

In some areas, such as the U.S. states of Colorado and Kentucky, vehicles in the left lane are required to yield to faster traffic only if the speed limit is above 65 miles per hour. In other areas, like Alaska, there is no law requiring slower traffic to move over for faster traffic.

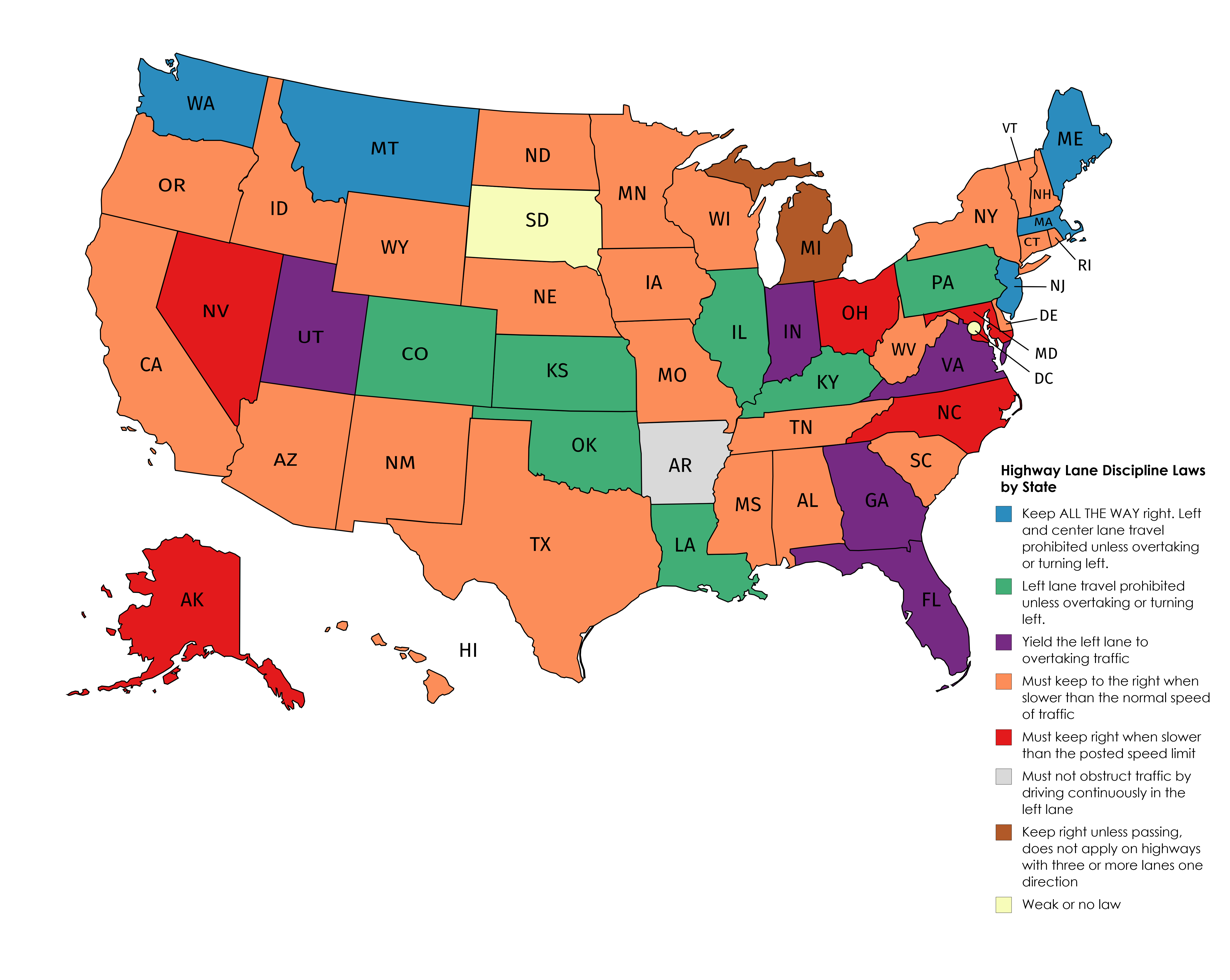
A map of the United States showing the lane discipline laws of each state.

=== Signage ===
A sign indicating that all vehicles shall be driven only in the right-hand lane unless overtaking slower vehicles.

The use of passing lanes for faster traffic is sometimes acknowledged with signs using phrases such as "Slower Traffic Keep Right" (in Canada, where the passing lane is to the left). In a study by the AASHTO Subcommittee on Traffic Engineering, all 24 U.S. states involved used some form of passing lane courtesy signage, 9 of which only use those signs for steep graded roads.

=== Proper use ===
Many areas which make it illegal to fail to yield to faster traffic also have exceptions to those rules. Some of these exceptions include preparing to make a left turn, taking an exit located on the left side of the roadway, avoiding traffic merging onto the roadway, or overtaking and passing another vehicle.

In the province of Quebec, it is illegal to travel in the left lane when not passing when the speed limit is over 80 km/h (50 mph).

Ontario's Highway Traffic Act does spell out when the left-hand passing lane can be used. The act says the left lane should be left open for passing. Vehicles travelling slower than “the normal speed of traffic” must use the right lane.

Truckers often use the passing lane in moderate traffic where legal to do so to reduce travel times, however in many areas, tractor trailers are banned from using the passing lane for safety reasons; these restrictions are normally found along urban, often congested highways with multiple lanes (e.g. Interstate 40 west of Raleigh, North Carolina), or on rural freeways with 6 or more lanes (3 in each direction).

=== Hammer lane ===
The hammer lane is another term for the passing lane. Its etymology originated with truckers in North America in reference to slamming the accelerator with a foot like hammer.

HOV lanes are not usually considered hammer lanes, but are also used for express travel by commuters.

== Climbing lane ==
A sign directing slower traffic to remain in the right-hand lane.

In hilly terrain, some highways have an additional "climbing lane" or "crawler lane" for the use of heavy or underpowered vehicles which climb hills more slowly than they traverse flat ground. For example, a highway with one travel lane in each direction would typically expand to two lanes for traffic proceeding uphill, retaining one lane for downhill traffic.

== Australian use ==
In Australia, most intercity highways are constructed with only one lane in each direction. Head-on collisions are a risk, particularly with fatigued drivers. Overtaking lanes are an additional lane in one direction for a short distance (1 to 2 kilometres [0.62 to 1.24 mi]) to assist faster traffic to safely overtake slower traffic. Road markings are often painted so that the additional lane appears in the centre of the road (guiding traffic to the left), and traffic needs to deliberately change lanes to overtake. At the end, the markings are the other way, so that the left lane must yield and merge into the overtaking lane. Large signs alert drivers that they are approaching an overtaking lane, often at 5 km (3.1 mi) and 1 km (0.62 mi) distances before the lane starts.

== Cultural references ==
- Fast Lane, an arcade game
- Life in the Fast Lane, a song by the Eagles
- Jones in the Fast Lane, 1990 MS-DOS based game
