= Realm of Impossibility =

1983 video game

- Developer: BRAM
- Publishers: BRAM (Zombies): NA: Electronic Arts; EU: Ariolasoft
- Designer: Mike Edwards
- Platforms: Apple II, Atari 8-bit, Commodore 64, ZX Spectrum
- Release: 1983: Atari (BRAM); 1984: Atari (EA), Apple, C64; 1985: Spectrum
- Genre: Action
- Modes: Single-player, multiplayer

Realm of Impossibility is an action game created by Mike Edwards for Atari 8-bit computers and published by Electronic Arts in 1984. It was originally released in 1983 as Zombies by BRAM, a company formed by Edwards and a friend. BRAM previously developed and published Attack at EP-CYG-4.

Electronic Arts ported Realm of Impossibility to the Apple II and Commodore 64. A ZX Spectrum version was published in 1985 by Ariolasoft.

== Plot ==
The player must traverse 13 dungeons to gather seven crowns to defeat the evil cleric Wistrik.

== Gameplay ==
Each dungeon comprises up to a dozen separate rooms, with the game moving from one to another when the player moves reaches the edge of the screen. The player navigates through the rooms to find the treasure: either a crown or a key that provides access to a locked dungeon.

The rooms contain zombies, snakes, spiders and other creatures which cannot be killed. The joystick button drops crosses which block the creatures. A dozen crosses can be present at once, and they disappear slowly over time.

Scrolls can be collected allowing spells to be cast by pressing the first letter of its name on the keyboard:

1. Freeze: holds a monster in place for a short duration
2. Protect: makes the player immune to damage for a time
3. Confuse: makes the monster wander in a daze for a while

Two players can play cooperatively on the same screen. This doubles the number of crosses visible at once. Both players need to reach the edge of the screen to cause it to move to the next screen.

== Development ==
Edwards worked at Boeing. When his job changed and he was no longer programming at work, he became interested in the home computer market as a way to continue programming. Checking over various models at a local computer store, he purchased an Atari after seeing Star Raiders. After having the machine for a while he began programming on it and, at the suggestion of a long-time friend, wrote a simple program in Atari BASIC to sell locally as a tax dodge.

He then began programming his first game, Attack at EP-CYG-4, a shoot 'em up which allowed two players at once. This was licensed to another company for sale on game cartridge, with Edwards helping with the port. He then began work on a maze game, which became Zombies after adding in 3D effects at the prompting of his partner. The game contained several levels of increasing complexity. The last level, "The Realm of Impossibility", contained a number of optical illusions similar to those popularized by artist M. C. Escher. Surfaces that appear vertical turn out to be horizontal, and other illusions can confuse the player.

The success of the original release prompted Don Daglow to acquire the rights for EA. Minor changes were made to the game, new levels were added, and a new soundtrack was added, written by Dave Warhol who had worked with Daglow on the Intellivision game design team. Officially renamed Mike Edwards' Realm of Impossibility, it was released not long after the original BRAM release, with the box cover touting "Deluxe Edition of The Classic Game Zombies". The game was part of the "third wave" of titles introduced by Electronic Arts after its founding in 1982.

== Reception ==
ROM's review praised the game's unusual lack of weapons and use of 3D graphics. Antic's review of the original stated that "computer enthusiasts who enjoy quick-paced, challenging action games will like Zombies".

Computer Gaming World said of the revised version: "I do not feel that the changes [from Zombies] are numerous-enough or significant enough to justify buying the both games. However, if you have neither, then ROI is a good addition to your arcade-action game inventory". Steve Panak of ANALOG Computing wrote: "Your problem is that you must be perfectly immobile to cast your spell, and in this game you can't afford to stand still too often, or for very long". He disliked the defensive nature of the game, wanting a way to destroy his pursuers. He concluded, "while the Realm of Impossibility fails on many levels, it is still not bad enough to make me lose faith in Electronic Arts". COMPUTE! called it "a classic, run-as-fast-as-you-can, three- dimensional arcade game with a goal", noting that "what distinguishes Realm of Impossibility from the run-of-the-mill chase game is not the three dimensions, but one element: cooperation". The magazine praised the Apple II version's graphics and two-player mode.

Ariolasoft's conversion of the game to the ZX Spectrum garnered negative reviews. Your Sinclair critic gave it a three out of ten, describing it as an "object lesson in flickery sprites, bad control and the odd bug or three". Crash scored it a 10%, calling it "one of the worst Spectrum games I've seen in a long while"; it "could have been a passable game a couple of years ago. A joke today". The game took third place for the magazine's 1986 readers' award for "Least Pleasing Game", garnering 4.5% of all votes.
