= New York City (video game) =

1984 video game

- Developer: Synapse Software
- Publisher: Synapse Software
- Designer: Russ Segal
- Programmers: Atari 8-bit Russ Segal; Commodore 64; Greg Nelson
- Platforms: Atari 8-bit, Commodore 64
- Release: 1984
- Genre: Action

N.Y.C. The Big Apple (also known as New York City) is an action game written by Russ Segal for Atari 8-bit computers and published by Synapse Software in 1984. Segal previously wrote Picnic Paranoia for Synapse. New York City was ported to the Commodore 64 by Greg Nelson.

As part of a "Double Play" promotion, New York City was sold as part of a two-game combo, with Electrician on the other side of the disk.

== Gameplay ==
Atari 8-bit gameplay

The gameplay involves visiting tourist destinations of New York City such as Grant's Tomb and the U.N. building, as well as less important locations such as the automat and bank. Each location consists of a mini-game, accessed by walking, driving or taking the subway in a stylised rendition of Manhattan Island.

The game begins in a parking lot somewhere inside a randomly generated city. The player is given a car to drive along the city streets and avoid the other traffic as long as they have gas to spare. If they run out of gas or crash, a tow truck will deliver the vehicle back to the parking lot, and the player must walk from then on. If the player gets run over by a vehicle they are transported to the hospital. Minigames include the subway, where a token must be collected before boarding the train; the Central Park Zoo, where animals must be rounded up; and the automat, where food must be collected before other diners. A clock prompts the player when to search for food and when go on with the next mission. The clock runs from 9am to 5pm, and the goal is to survive in New York City for seven days.
