= Picnic Paranoia =

1982 video game

- TI-99/4A Atarisoft box cover
- Publisher(s): Synapse Software; Atarisoft (TI)
- Designer(s): Russ Segal
- Platform(s): Atari 8-bit, TI-99/4A, Apple II
- Release: 1982: Atari, Apple; 1983: TI-99/4A
- Genre(s): Action

Picnic Paranoia is an action game written by Russ Segal for both the Atari 8-bit computers and Apple II and published by Synapse Software in 1982. A version for the TI-99/4A was published by Atarisoft in 1983. Although the gameplay is identical, all three versions of the game utilize slightly different graphics.

Segal later wrote New York City for Synapse.

== Gameplay ==
Atari 8-bit screenshot

As "George" the player attempts to protect their picnic from ants, who will carry off the food, spiders, who will weave webs to slow George down or bite, and wasps, who will sting to paralyze. While fending off the insects the player must move the food back on to the tables. Points are gained for food still visible on the screen at the end of each round. Each round lasts 90 seconds. There are sixteen rounds in a game. If all the food is pushed off the screen the game ends.

== Reception ==
Allen Doum reviewed the game for Computer Gaming World stating that "animation and graphics are excellent. George, the wasp, and a multitude of ants all move smoothly around the screen, though the spiders suffer by comparison. Sound cues for walking, being stung, the wasp, and for food being pushed are all well done. The music that accompanies the copywrite screen is great, even by Synapse standards".
