= Chicken (video game) =

1982 video game

- Publisher: Synapse Software
- Programmer: Mike Potter
- Platform: Atari 8-bit
- Release: 1982
- Genre: Action
- Modes: Single-player, multiplayer

Chicken is a video game for Atari 8-bit computers written by Mike Potter and published by Synapse Software in 1982. The game is similar to Atari, Inc.'s. 1978 arcade video game Avalanche, replacing the buckets and boulders with a hen trying to catch her eggs.

== Gameplay ==
Two eggs falling toward the chicken's basket at the bottom

Chicken follows the design of the 1978 arcade game Avalanche, but with a number of twists. The player is in control of a chicken that can move horizontally back and forth along the bottom of the playfield, pushing a basket. At the top, a fox drops the chicken's eggs over a series of moving blocks. The eggs fall through gaps between the blocks, which randomize their final drop point.

If an egg reaches the ground, it cracks open and hatches into a chick. These form barriers to motion for the player, but the chicken can jump over them by pressing the fire button. If a player steps on a chick, a farmer appears and kicks the player off the screen. The action increases in pace until it becomes extremely fast-paced.

The game can be played with a joystick, but is best played with a paddle controller. Up to four players can be in a single game, but they take turns using the single controller.

== Development ==
Mike Potter joined Synapse in 1981 after writing the game Protector and initially distributing it through another company, Crystalware. When he questioned his royalties, they released the game back to him. He rereleased a version through Synapse with a number of bug fixes.

Chicken was his first game written entirely at Synapse, and the first whose idea was given to him by Synapse's founder, Ihor Wolosenko. Wolosenko's primary inspiration was arcade games, and many of Synapse's releases from this era are adaptations of contemporary games for the Atari platform.

== Reception ==
Creative Computing called the game "silly, but fun" and noted that the players often broke out laughing.

== See also ==
- Eggomania
