= Shamus (video game) =

1982 video game

- Developer: Synapse Software
- Publishers: Synapse Software; Atarisoft; Atari Corporation
- Designer: Cathryn Mataga
- Programmers: Atari 8-bit Cathryn Mataga; Apple II; Greg Nelson; C64; Jack L. Thornton Jr. TI-99/4A; Greg Simons; Color Computer; Larry Abel; VIC-20; Tom Griner
- Platforms: Atari 8-bit, Apple II, VIC-20, Commodore 64, IBM PC, TI-99/4A, TRS-80 Color Computer, Game Boy Color
- Release: 1982
- Genre: Shooter
- Mode: Single-player

Shamus is a shooter with light action-adventure game elements written by Cathryn Mataga (credited as William Mataga) and published by Synapse Software. The original Atari 8-bit computer version was released on disk and tape in 1982. According to Synapse co-founder Ihor Wolosenko, Shamus made the company famous by giving it a reputation for quality. "Funeral March of a Marionette", the theme song from Alfred Hitchcock Presents, plays on the title screen.

The player moves through four flip-screen levels, each containing 32 rooms, shooting attackers and collecting keys for locked areas while searching for the exit. Shamus was inspired by the 1980 Berzerk arcade video game.

The game was ported to the Apple II, VIC-20, Commodore 64, TRS-80 Color Computer, TI-99/4A, and IBM PC. Several of these were published by Atarisoft. It was later sold on cartridge by Atari Corporation following the launch of the Atari XEGS in 1987.

Shamus was followed by a sequel in 1983, Shamus: Case II, with the same characters but different gameplay. In 1999, Mataga released a remake for the Game Boy Color and later both Shamus and Shamus: Case II for iOS.

== Gameplay ==
Inspired by the arcade game Berzerk, the objective of the game is to navigate the eponymous robotic detective through a 4-skill level, 128-room maze of electrified walls. The ultimate goal at the end of this journey is "The Shadow's Lair". Shamus differs from Berzerk in having a persistent world instead of rooms that are randomly generated each time they are entered. There are also items to collect: bottles containing extra lives, mystery question marks, and keys which open exits.

In-game screenshot (Atari 8-bit)

Opposing the player are a number of robotic adversaries, including spiral drones, robo droids and snap jumpers. Shamus is armed with "Ion SHIVs", SHIV being an acronym for Short High Intensity Vaporizer, and is able to hurl up to two at a time at his enemies. Like many other games in this genre, touching an electrified wall results in instantaneous death. Upon the completion of each level, the gameplay speeds up, increasing the chances of running into a wall.

The main gameplay involves clearing the room of all enemies, picking up special items on the way and then leaving through an exit. Upon returning to the room, the enemies are regenerated and returned to their original positions. In exactly the same way as Berzerk, the player will be attacked if they spend too much time in one room. In this case, the Shadow himself emerges from off-screen and hops directly at Shamus, unhindered by the walls. If shot, the Shadow briefly freezes in place.

The combination of locks and keys requires the player to complete each of its four levels in a particular order. To complete the game in its entirety would take several hours, which combined with the lack of a pause function (except on the IBM version), the necessity of remembering the location of dozens of rooms and keys, and the frenetic gameplay, meant that this was extremely difficult to accomplish.

Each maze layout is named after a famous fictional detective or secret agent.

== Ports ==
The VIC-20 port is 8K and contains only 32 rooms, unlike the 128 in every other version.

== Reception ==
Shamus sold 60,000 copies.

Softline in 1983 wrote: "Shamus is the best cross between arcade and adventure games currently on the Atari market ... To know it is to love it, play it constantly, and not get enough of it". That year Softline's readers named the game seventh on the magazine's Top Thirty list of Atari 8-bit programs by popularity, and in 1984 they named Shamus in tenth place for 1983.

Electronic Fun gave the Atari version a 3 out of 5 review, calling the graphics "superb" and saying "this doesn't look like it could ever get boring." ROM Magazine gave the Atari version a 9.4 out of 10 rating, and Creative Computing suggested "Make sure you have no pressing appointments before becoming involved in a round of Shamus. Once you get going, you won't want to stop for a while." Ahoy! wrote in 1984 that Shamus for the Commodore 64 "is a thoroughly enjoyable game with all the action and suspense that both novices and sophisticated gamers will demand".

In 1982, Computer Gaming World reviewed the Atari original, praising the animation and the "vastly superior graphics" over Berzerk, but complaining of the inability to pause the action and of a bug in the speed control. Shamus was considered "the most addictive" of the four games reviewed.

Matthew J. Costello reviewed Shamus in Space Gamer No. 68. Costello commented that "Shamus is not easy, but the folks at Synapse are giving Atari owners their money's worth."
