= Zeppelin (1983 video game) =

1983 video game

- Publisher: Synapse Software
- Designer: Cathryn Mataga
- Programmers: Atari 8-bit Cathryn Mataga; Commodore 64; David Barbour
- Platforms: Atari 8-bit, Commodore 64
- Release: 1983
- Genre: Scrolling shooter

Zeppelin is a multidirectional scrolling shooter designed by Cathryn Mataga (credited as William Mataga) and published in 1983 by Synapse Software for Atari 8-bit computers. A Commodore 64 port programmed by David Barbour was released in 1984.

== Gameplay ==
The zeppelin, just right of center, carrying a key (Atari 8-bit)

In Zeppelin the player takes on the role of a pilot exploring an underground dungeon complex. The goal is to bypass or destroy the cave's defenses, such as laser gates, enemy zeppelins and falling rocks, while trying to blow up enemy lairs using dynamite. Parts of the enemy defense system can be disabled by shooting switches scattered around the cave.

The game offers a two-player mode where one player controls the movement of the zeppelin, while the other controls the guns.

== Reception ==
The game has been met with positive reviews. The Addison-Wesley Book of Atari Software 1984 gave the game a very positive rating (B+) and praised the graphics and two-player mode. Bits and Bytes gave a very positive review of the Commodore 64 version of Zeppelin in its September 1983 issue: "The sound and graphics are exceptionally good, the colours rich and well-defined, and the background intricately detailed."
