= Faslane (disambiguation) =

Faslane (His Majesty's Naval Base Clyde) is a Royal Navy base on the Gare Loch, Argyll and Bute, Scotland.

Faslane can also refer to:

- Faslane (bay), the geographical bay where the naval base has been built
- Faslane Castle, Shandon Castle, and St Michael's Chapel, ruinous sites of former castles and chapels in the area of Faslane
- Faslane Peace Camp, a permanent camp of anti-nuclear weapon protestors, based outside the naval base

== See also ==
- Fastlane (disambiguation)
