= Jungle Hunt =

1982 video game

- North American arcade flyer
- Developers: Taito (arcade); Atari, Inc. (ports)
- Publishers: Taito (arcade); Atari, Inc. (ports); Atarisoft (ports)
- Platforms: Arcade, Apple II, Atari 8-bit, Atari 2600, Atari 5200, ColecoVision, Commodore 64, IBM PC, VIC-20, TI-99/4A
- Release: Jungle King: JP: June 23, 1982; NA: 1982; EU: 1982; Jungle Hunt: JP: July 1982; NA: August 1982; Pirate Pete: NA: November 1982
- Genres: Action, platformer
- Modes: Single-player, multiplayer
- Arcade system: Taito SJ System

Jungle Hunt (Note: ジヤングル・ハント, Jiyanguru Hanto) is a 1982 platform video game developed and published by Taito for arcades. It was originally distributed in 1982 as Jungle King, (Note: ジャングル・キング, Jiyanguru Kingu) then quickly modified and re-released as Jungle Hunt following a copyright dispute over the player character's likeness to Tarzan. Taito also distributed a less successful rebranding of the game as Pirate Pete in 1982. Jungle King, along with Moon Patrol released a month earlier, is one of the first video games with parallax scrolling.

The player controls an unnamed character moving through right-to-left scrolling scenes to rescue a woman from cannibals by swinging from vine to vine, swimming through a crocodile-infested river, avoiding rolling boulders, and jumping over her captors.

Home versions of Jungle Hunt were published by Atari, Inc. for the Atari 2600, Atari 5200, and Atari 8-bit computers starring a British explorer named Sir Dudley. Ports under the Atarisoft label were released for Apple II, ColecoVision, Commodore 64, VIC-20, and IBM PC compatibles.

== Gameplay ==
The game is split into four sections which scroll right to left.

In the first, the explorer is swinging from vine to vine by pressing the button when two vines are close enough together. Missing a vine causes the explorer to fall to the jungle floor, losing a life.

After the last vine, the explorer dives into a crocodile-infested river. The explorer can attack the crocodiles from below with his knife when their mouths are closed. The explorer must periodically return to the surface to breathe, where he cannot attack the crocodiles. Bubbles occasionally rise from the bottom of the river, that can trap the explorer and carry him to the surface, potentially hitting crocodiles on the way.

After jumping out the river, the explorer runs up a hill while dodging various-sized boulders. The boulders bounce at varying speeds and heights, requiring the explorer to either jump or duck at the appropriate moment.

In the final scene, the explorer must evade cannibals while attempting to get to a woman being lowered into a cauldron. After the player rescues the woman, the word "Congratulations!" appears, which is then followed by a message saying "I Love You!!!" ending with the woman kissing the explorer.

Further gameplay repeats the scenes with additional obstacles. Monkeys appear on some vines and must be avoided. A cannibal in the tree of the cauldron scene throws spears at the player.

== Release ==
The release of Jungle King with its Tarzan-like hero prompted legal action from the estate of Edgar Rice Burroughs. This resulted in the name being changed to Jungle Hunt with several cosmetic modifications:

1. The main character is an explorer wearing a pith helmet and safari outfit.
2. The swinging vines have slightly different visuals to pass them off as ropes.
3. The Tarzan yell at the start of the game is replaced by the music from the end of the river scene.

== Ports ==
Sir Dudley jumping between vines (Atari 2600 version pictured)

Atari, Inc. published home ports in 1983 under their own brand for the Atari 2600, Atari 5200, and Atari 8-bit computers. Ports for other platforms were released under the Atarisoft label: Apple II, ColecoVision, Commodore 64, VIC-20, IBM PC compatibles, and TI-99/4A. In the Atari branded versions, the hero is named Sir Dudley, and the girl, married to Sir Dudley, is Lady Penelope.

The Apple II and IBM PC versions were developed by Sierra On-Line.

== Reception ==
In the United States, Jungle King was the top-grossing upright arcade cabinet on the monthly RePlay charts by October 1982. Jungle Hunt had also topped the RePlay charts by January 1983. By July 1983, it had sold an estimated 18,000 arcade cabinets in the United States, and it was one of the six top-grossing games during that period. Jungle King went on to be one of the thirteen highest-grossing arcade games of 1983.

Bill Kunkel reviewed Jungle King for Electronic Games magazine in early 1983, writing that it could become Taito's "biggest hit since Space Invaders" as it follows "the classic formula for successful videogames: easy to learn, difficult to master." He said it was "an undeniable kick the first few plays, but doesn't seem to hold up for extended periods of time" and called the graphics of the vine-swinging segment "downright hideous", but noted "gamers seem to be enjoying it."

Raymond Dimetrosky of Video Games Player rated the Atari VCS version a B+, calling it "quite good" considering the limitations of the VCS. William Michael Brown reviewed the Atari 5200 port in the September 1983 issue of Electronic Fun with Computers & Games, rating it a 3 out of 4. He called it a significant improvement over the "disappointing" Atari VCS version, saying it looks and plays better and brings "much of the coin-op challenge."

Jungle Hunt received a Certificate of Merit in the category of "Best Adventure Videogame" at the 5th annual Arkie Awards in January 1984.

== Legacy ==
In November 1982, Taito released another version of the game in arcades as Pirate Pete with the same gameplay. The player character is now a pirate; the vines are replaced by ropes swinging from the masts of a very long ship; sharks swim in the water instead of crocodiles; and sword-wielding pirates take the place of cannibals.

In 1983, Milton Bradley published a board game version of Jungle Hunt where ropes are a key element.

Jungle Hunt is included in the Taito Legends collection for Windows, PlayStation 2, and Xbox.

For unknown reasons, Taito's later releases of the game exclusively include Pirate Pete instead of Jungle Hunt. Hamster Corporation released Pirate Pete for their Arcade Archives series for the Nintendo Switch and PlayStation 4 in June 2021.
