= Synapse Software =

American video game-developing company

- Type: Corporation / Subsidiary
- Founders: Ihor Wolosenko; Ken Grant
- Defunct: 1985
- Fate: Defunct (purchased by Broderbund)
- Successor: The Learning Company
- Products: Video games Productivity software Programming tools

Synapse Software Corporation (marketed as SynSoft in the UK) was an American software developer and publisher founded in 1981 by Ihor Wolosenko and Ken Grant. Synapse published application software and developer tools, but was primarily known for video games. It initially focused on the Atari 8-bit computers, then later developed for the Commodore 64 and other systems. Synapse was purchased by Broderbund in late 1984 and the Synapse label retired in 1985.

The company's first release was the database File Manager 800, written by Grant and Wolosenko, followed by the game Dodge Racer, a clone of Sega's Head On programmed by Rob Re. 1981's Protector and 1982's Shamus established Synapse as a creator of high-quality action games. Additional well-received releases followed, including Rainbow Walker, Blue Max, The Pharaoh's Curse, and some others based on unusual concepts, like Necromancer and Alley Cat. First-person game Dimension X was promoted for its "altered perspective scrolling" technology, then released in a cut-down form over nine months later to disappointing reviews. The company also sold databases, a 6502 assembler, and a suite of biofeedback hardware and software. A line of productivity applications published in 1983, including a spreadsheet, led to financial difficulties and the company's downfall.

The box art for most of Synapse's games was done by Tim Boxell, a friend of Ihor Wolosenko.

== Action games ==
Synapse's first video games were for the Atari 8-bit computers, starting in 1981. Some of their early releases were based on elements of contemporary arcade games. Dodge Racer (1981) is a clone of Sega's Head On, and Protector (1981) uses elements of Defender. Chicken (1982) has the same basic concept as Kaboom! for the Atari 2600, which itself is similar to the arcade game Avalanche.

Nautilus (1982) uses a split-screen so two players can play at once. In single-player mode the user controls a submarine, the Nautilus, in the lower screen while the computer controls a destroyer, the Colossus, on the upper screen. In two-player mode, another player controls the destroyer. The same system was later re-used in other games, including Shadow World.

Survivor (1982) supports up to four simultaneous players, via the four joystick ports on the Atari 400 and Atari 800 computers. Each player commands a different part of a single spaceship. In single-player mode it operates like the ship in Asteroids, while in two player mode one drives and the other fires in any direction.

In an interview with Antic, Wolosenko agreed that 1982's Shamus was the beginning of Synapse's reputation for quality products. Other similar caliber, better advertised games followed in 1982-3. These include Necromancer, Rainbow Walker, Blue Max, Fort Apocalypse, Alley Cat, and The Pharaoh's Curse. It was during this period that the company branched out and started supporting other systems, especially the Commodore 64, which became a major platform. Many of Synapse's games made their way to the UK as part of the initial wave of U.S. Gold-distributed imports (under the "Synsoft" imprint). Some were also converted to run on more popular UK home computers, such as the ZX Spectrum.

Synapse was an early developer for the unsuccessful graphics-accelerated Mindset computer project and created the first-person game Vyper (1984) for it.

=== Ports and re-releases ===
Synapse developed an official port of the arcade video game Zaxxon for the Commodore 64. The Atari 8-bit port was from Datasoft. Synapse also published Encounter! in 1983, which was originally released in the UK by Novagen Software without the exclamation mark in the name. Salmon Run, the first game from Necromancer and Alley Cat designer Bill Williams, was published by the Atari Program Exchange in 1982; Synapse released a VIC-20 port under the "Showcase Software" label the following year.

== Utilities and productivity software ==
Although it is for their success with arcade-style games that it is primarily remembered, Synapse started out selling database software for the Atari 8-bit computers. In 1982 Synapse released SynAssembler, a 6502 development system which was much faster than Atari's offerings at the time. SynAssembler is a port of the S-C Assembler II Version 4.0 from the Apple II. The port was done by Steve Hales, who also wrote games for Synapse.

Synapse was developing a series of home productivity and financial applications: SynFile+ (written in Forth by Steve Ahlstrom and Dan Moore of The 4th Works), SynCalc, Synfilet, SynChron, SynComm, SynStock, and SynTrend.

== Interactive fiction ==
Some time before their demise, Synapse had started work on interactive fiction games (or as they called them, "Electronic Novels"). The games were all based on a parser called "BTZ" (Better Than Zork), written by William Mataga and Steve Hales. Seven games were written using the system but only four released, the best-known being the critically well-received Mindwheel.

== Downfall ==
By early 1984 Synapse was the largest third-party provider of Atari 8-bit software, but 65% of its sales came from the Commodore market. The company ran into financial difficulty. According to Steve Hales they had taken a calculated risk in developing the series of productivity applications and had entered into a collaboration with Atari, Inc. When Jack Tramiel purchased Atari's consumer division from Warner Communications, he refused to pay for the 40,000 units of software that had been shipped.

Thrown into a cash crisis, Synapse was purchased by Broderbund Software in late 1984. Although the intention had been to keep Synapse going, the market had changed, and they were unable to make money from the electronic novels. Approximately one year after the takeover, Broderbund closed Synapse down.

== Software ==
Some games were sold together as "Double Plays," with one being a bonus game on the other side of the disk. Rainbow Walker was initially sold by itself, and the second game added later.

1981
- Disk Manager
- Dodge Racer
- FileManager 800 (database)
- FileManager+ (database)
- Protector

1982

- Chicken
- Claim Jumper
- Fort Apocalypse
- Nautilus
- Necromancer (later from Atari Corporation as an XEGS-styled cartridge)
- Page 6, "a hands-on assembly language tutorial"
- Picnic Paranoia
- Protector II
- Shamus
- Slime
- Survivor
- SynAssembler (6502 assembler)

1983

- Alley Cat
- Blue Max
- Countdown
- Drelbs
- The Pharaoh's Curse
- Rainbow Walker
- Shadow World
- Shamus: Case II
- SynCalc
- SynChron
- SynComm
- SynFile+
- SynStock
- SynTrend
- Zeppelin

1984

- Air Support
- Blue Max 2001
- Brimstone (electronic novel)
- Dimension X
- Doughboy (C64)
- Electrician
- Encounter!
- Essex (electronic novel)
- Mindwheel (electronic novel)
- New York City
- Quasimodo
- Rainbow Walker
- Relax, biofeedback package
- Sentinel
- Slamball
- Vyper (Mindset)
- The Warrior of Zypar
- Zaxxon, C64 arcade port

=== Showcase Software ===
At the 1983 Consumer Electronics Show, Synapse announced it would publish games for the VIC-20. These were a mix of original titles and ports sold under the name Showcase Software. Only some of the announced games were released.

- Astro Patrol
- Salmon Run - originally published in 1982 for Atari 8-bit computers through the Atari Program Exchange
- Squeeze
