= Blue Max (video game) =

1983 video game

- Cover art by Tim Boxell
- Developer: Synapse Software
- Publishers: Synapse Software; U.S. Gold (UK); Atari Corporation
- Designer: Bob Polin
- Programmers: Bob Polin (Atari); Peter Adams (C64)
- Platforms: Atari 8-bit, Commodore 64, ZX Spectrum
- Release: 1983: Atari, C64; 1984: Spectrum; 1987: XEGS
- Genre: Scrolling shooter
- Mode: Single-player

Blue Max is a scrolling shooter written by Bob Polin for Atari 8-bit computers and published by Synapse Software in 1983. It was released for the Commodore 64 the same year. U.S. Gold published the Commodore 64 version in the UK in 1984 and ported the game to the ZX Spectrum. In 1987, Atari Corporation re-released Blue Max as a cartridge styled for the then-new Atari XEGS.

The player controls a Sopwith Camel biplane during World War I, attempting to shoot down enemy planes and bomb targets on diagonally scrolling terrain. The game is named after the medal Pour le Mérite, informally known as Blue Max. The theme song is "Rule, Britannia!".

Blue Max was positively received by critics. In 1984 Synapse released a science fiction themed sequel also by Polin, Blue Max 2001.

== Gameplay ==
Blue Max theme song "Rule, Britannia!", Atari 8-bit version

The game opens with the player's aircraft parked on a runway while a rendition of "Rule, Britannia!" plays. After selecting control and difficulty options and pressing start, the screen shows the aircraft speeding down the runway. The player is required to push the joystick in order to take off, but not before the plane reaches a certain minimum speed. Afterwards, the screen scrolls diagonally in the fashion of Zaxxon, using oblique projection to simulate three-dimensions. The player can move left, right, forward and backward, or raise/lower their altitude with the joystick. The fire button shoots the machine guns continually, while pressing and moving the stick down at the same time causes a bomb to drop.

The player-controlled plane (white) flying over a bridge in the Atari 8-bit version.

The game is divided into several areas, each one ending with a runway where the player should land. The first area has a large river on the left side of the screen and a grassy treed area on the right. In the second area, the river eventually gives way to land and roads filled with tanks and enemy airbases. The third and final area is the city, composed of skyscrapers and bunkers, destruction of which is the goal of the game.

Each area contains various targets to destroy, including warships in the river that fire flak, tanks, bridges, buildings, and enemy biplanes which appear occasionally in front or behind and shoot at the player's aircraft.

The player's aircraft may be damaged by enemy firepower. Each shot taken causes one of four possible impairments: gun damage, bomb gear damage, fuel leak, or decreased maneuverability. The fifth shot taken obliterates the plane. The player may also die by colliding with the ground or an enemy plane, or by expending all of the fuel.

After flying a certain distance, the player is notified, by a beeping sound, that a friendly airbase is about to appear. The player should then land on the airfield, which refuels the aircraft, fixes its damage, and replenishes its supply of bombs.

In order to access the next area, the player must destroy a certain number of special targets: flashing cars and planes, and buildings and bridges marked with a flashing cross. If not enough special targets have been destroyed, the plane, upon taking off, will fly through the same area again.

The ultimate goal is to reach the final area and bomb the three bunkers inside the heavily defended city, and then reach the airfield at the end of the stage. Upon finishing, either by succeeding or dying, the player is given a numerical rank based on their performance.

== Reception ==
SoftSide called the Atari version "remarkably well implemented" and "very playable and a lot of fun."The Addison-Wesley Book of Atari Software 1984 gave the game an overall A rating, calling it "very enjoyable" with "a realistic sensation of flying," and concluded that it "has great depth of play to hold interest for a long time". InfoWorld's Essential Guide to Atari Computers cited it as "innovative" and a "winner".

Softline praised Blue Max's graphics, describing the game as "River Raid for real and Zaxxon with meat on it ... if Zaxxon deserved to be a hit, this deserves to be a monster." In 1984, the magazine's readers named the game the second most-popular Atari program of 1983, after Archon.

Compute! wrote, "along comes a game that may make standard two-dimensional eye/hand games obsolete ... Blue Max may well be the best action game there is." It stated that the game improved on Zaxxon, noting the functional instrument panel and need to land, refuel, and take off. The magazine concluded, "Blue Max is head and shoulders above other shooting games."

The C64 port received a similar response. Compute!'s Gazette stated that "Blue Max has far more depth than Zaxxon. It is one of those few good games that have successfully combined strategy with arcade play". Ahoy! approved of the game's sound and 3D graphics, but criticized the unrealistic plane shadow. While the reviewer stated "Occasionally I found myself wishing for more action. No, not more action—bigger action", he concluded "Bob Polin has done an exceptional job; this is one game that is really addictive". In 1996, Computer Gaming World ranked the C64 version of this "fun shooter" as the 142nd best game of all time.

The game sold 10,000 copies.

== Legacy ==
A futuristic sequel otherwise similar in design, Blue Max 2001, was released in 1984 for Atari 8-bit computers and Commodore 64. Unlike the original, it received mixed reviews.

Author Bob Polin made the assembly language source code of Blue Max publicly available in 2016.
