= Electrician (video game) =

1984 video game

- Famicom Disk System cover
- Developers: Synapse Software; Kemco (FDS)
- Publishers: Synapse Software; Kemco (FDS)
- Designer: David Bunch
- Composer: Hiroyuki Masuno (Famicom)
- Platforms: Atari 8-bit, Famicom Disk System
- Release: NA: 1984; JP: 26 December 1986
- Genre: Platform
- Mode: Single-player

Electrician is a platform game written by David Bunch for Atari 8-bit computers and published by Synapse Software in 1984. Synapse sold the game as a "Double Play", with the game New York City on one side of the floppy disk, and Electrician on the other. Kemco adapted the game for the Family Computer Disk System, and republished it in 1986.

David Bunch later co-designed the 1988 game Skate or Die!.

== Gameplay ==
Gameplay screenshot (Atari 8-bit)

The player character is an electrician named Richard Light. He must install electrical wiring in apartment buildings. In each building, Richard navigates service corridors to link the electrical wires between each room. As he does so, animals threaten to chew through the wires. When an electrical connection is complete, the live wires illuminate the connected rooms and electrocute the animals on contact. If Richard touches any of the rats, bats, or giant insects in the corridor, he loses a life. In the buildings, the player earns points by illuminating rooms and electrocuting any rats, bats, and insects. Occasionally, a burglar appears; intercepting him rewards the player with bonus points and an extra life.

After wiring all the rooms in an apartment building, the player exits and navigates a dark sewer to the next building. In the sewer, the player must avoid alligators. A flashlight reveals walls that block passages.
