= Dodge 'Em =

1980 video game

- Developer: Atari, Inc.
- Publishers: Atari, Inc.
- Programmer: Carla Meninsky
- Platform: Atari 2600
- Release: September 1980
- Genres: Maze
- Modes: Single-player, multiplayer

Dodge 'Em is a driving-themed maze game programmed by Carla Meninsky and published in 1980 by Atari, Inc. for the Atari 2600 (originally known as the Atari Video Computer System). Similar to Sega's 1979 Head On arcade game, Dodge 'Em is played on a single screen of four concentric roadways. Sears released the game for the "Sears Video Arcade" as Dodger Cars.

The Dodge 'Em cartridge includes three versions of the game, accessible through the Game Select switch on the Atari 2600. The first game is for one player, and the remaining two are for two players. The second game has the two players, one player playing the role of the player's car, alternating turns. In the third game, one player plays one car the other player controls the other car at the same time, alternating turns.

== Gameplay ==
Gameplay screenshot

The player controls one car and has to drive counter-clockwise, avoiding computer-controlled cars whose sole aim is to produce a head-on collision. The goal of the player is to collect all the dots from the maze. Each roadway of the maze has four gaps in it, at the top, bottom, left, and right of the screen. The player can use the gaps to change lanes in order to pick up dots or to avoid the computer-controlled cars.

The player's car can travel at two speeds, a normal speed which is the same speed as computer-controlled cars, or a fast (doubled) speed activated by pressing the controller button. The computer-controlled cars have only one speed. Players change lanes by pushing the controller in the appropriate direction when their car is near one of the gaps in the roadway.

The difficulty switches adjust the speed and the starting position of the computer-controlled car. Screens 1 and 2 have a single opposing car; 3 through 5 feature two. Screen 6 is as if going back screen 1, losing one life. The point counter resets at 1,000, although it reads as "00" (with the hundreds digit blank) due to an error. A kill screen occurs at "80" (1080 points) even if a player plays perfectly.

== Reception ==
Dodge 'Em was reviewed by Video magazine in its "Arcade Alley" column where it was described as "one of those rare videogames that is exciting in either one- or two-player versions". Although the reviewers suggested that "the early stages of each Dodge 'Em game can become predictable" for some players, the game was recommended to arcade game fans who were familiar with frequently replaying early levels in order to master them. It would go on to be given Honorable Mention in the category of "Best Solitaire Game" at the 3rd annual Arkie Awards.

== See also ==
- List of Atari 2600 games
- Dodge Racer
