= Howard Luedtke =

American singer-songwriter

- Born: Chippewa Falls, Wisconsin
- Genres: Blues, Blues-rock, Alternative rock
- Years active: 1974—present
- Label: False Dog Records
- Website: https://www.howardluedtke.com

Howard Luedtke, also known as Howard "Guitar" Luedtke, is an American blues guitarist, singer, songwriter and musician. Luedtke is considered one of the best slide guitar players in the American midwest, and currently tours with his band Howard "Guitar" Luedtke & Blue Max.

Blue Max is a Chippewa Falls, Wisconsin based blues-rock band that has been performing in the upper Midwest for the past two decades. Luedtke interprets the blues material by Johnny Winter, John Lee Hooker and Willie Dixon.

== Biography ==
=== Early life ===
Howard, from Chippewa Falls, Wisconsin, has been playing guitar since 1964. "I grew up with the Beatles, Hendrix and the Stones," says Luedtke. "Then in '69 or '70 I was first exposed to the classic blues and was fascinated by it." Howard played in a variety of blues, rock and country bands, in the Wisconsin area during the early seventies including Black Cat Bone Band in 1974. He formed his own band in 1982 called Blue Max.

=== Music career ===
Averaging over a 150 shows per year (solo and with Blue Max), Howard has traveled all over the midwest and Europe performing his tribute to the blues. His power-trio band is rounded out by his wife, Deb Klossner on bass and a wide assortment of drummers. From New Ulm, Minnesota, Klossner had been performing since 1983. After four years of performing with several rock bands in Southern Minnesota, Klossner joined Blue Max in 1987. Over the years Howard "Guitar" Luedtke & Blue Max has opened for the likes of Johnny Winter, Hubert Sumlin, Tinsley Ellis, Koko Taylor, Jeff Healey and Lonnie Brooks.

In 2001, Luedtke & Blue Max placed second in the Rock category of Contest 4 of Ed McMahon's NextBigStar.com Internet video contest.

Luedtke released Alone with the Blues (2006), a solo CD with him performing guitar and vocals.

== Discography ==
- Molded by the Blues (False Dog Records, 1992)
- Live in Geisdorf, Austria (False Dog Records, 1995)
- Face to Face with the Blues (False Dog Records, 1996)
- Alone with the Blues (False Dog Records, 2006)
- Goin' Down to Alabama (False Dog Records, 2016)
- Meet Me in Muscle Shoals (False Dog Records, 2019)
- By Request (False Dog Records, 2023)

=== Guest Artist ===
- Bake Sale Various Artists Great Northern Blues Society
- Michael Bucher Believe 2009
- Otis & The Alligators, Serious Alligations, 1991
