= Blue Max 2001 =

1984 video game

- Atari 8-bit and C64 share a flippy disk.
- Developer: Synapse Software
- Publishers: NA: Synapse Software; EU: U.S. Gold
- Designer: Bob Polin
- Programmers: Atari 8-bit Bob Polin
- Composer: Ihor Wolosenko
- Platforms: Atari 8-bit, Commodore 64
- Release: 1984
- Genre: Scrolling shooter
- Mode: Single-player

Blue Max 2001 is a diagonally scrolling shooter written by Bob Polin (also credited as Rob Polin) for Atari 8-bit computers and published by Synapse Software in 1984. A Commodore 64 version was released the same year. Blue Max 2001 is the sequel to 1983's Blue Max, also by Polin, with the player piloting a futuristic hovercraft instead of a World War I biplane. In Blue Max, the player flies diagonally up and to the right; in Blue Max 2001, movement is up and to the left. Critics found the game disappointing compared with the original, citing the indistinct graphics and confusing documentation.

== Reception ==
In contrast to the positive reception given to Blue Max, reviews of Blue Max 2001 on both Atari and Commodore systems were mixed.

Ahoy! called the Commodore 64 release an "exciting sequel" which "extends and refines the elements which made the original game popular, while it introduces enough new challenges to generate fresh excitement." Zzap!64 labeled it "one of the most disappointing sequels of all time". Reviewer Julian Rignall wrote, "The graphics are very poor", citing the "jelly mould" ship and "wonky" perspective. He mentioned the difficulty caused by use of the joystick diagonals.

Atari magazine Page 6 considered it a "disappointment" compared to its predecessor, remarking that the Polo mint ship is "a nightmare to fly, far less operate the bombs and lasers, with any degree of accuracy." Bill Kunkel wrote in an Atari Explorer review, "this game is plagued with ridiculous terminology and some of the shoddiest documentation since the days when computer software was sold in baggies." Antic found the Atari version had "fairly good graphics with some interesting touches, but the manual is a poor introduction to the game:

The documentation, unfortunately, appears to have been written in some other language and translated three or four times by volunteers. This means that the first half hour of play can be quite frustrating as you try to figure out exactly what is going on. In the end, though, it is well worth the effort.
