= Halcyon Days (book) =

1997 book by James Hague

Halcyon Days: Interviews with Classic Computer and Video Game Programmers
- Author: James Hague
- Subject: Software development
- Genre: Non-fiction
- Publication date: March 1997

Halcyon Days: Interviews with Classic Computer and Video Game Programmers is a digital book edited by James Hague and published in March 1997. The book was originally formatted using HTML and sold via mail order, shipped on a floppy disk by Dadgum Games for US$20. In 2002, Halcyon Days was made freely available on the web. The book continued to be sold by Dr. Dobb's Journal, on a CD-ROM also containing Susan Lammers's Programmers at Work, until Dr. Dobb's shut down at the end of 2014.

The introduction to Halcyon Days is written by John Romero who told Wired News that the interviews were "like hearing messages from old gods".

Halcyon Days has since become a common reference for writings on game history, including Racing the Beam (MIT Press, 2009), and Retrogame Archeology (Springer, 2016).

== Interviewees ==
- Ed Averett: Magnavox Odyssey² games
- Danielle Bunten Berry: M.U.L.E., The Seven Cities of Gold
- Stephen C. Biggs
- Adam Billyard
- Bill Budge: Raster Blaster, Pinball Construction Set
- Chris Crawford: Eastern Front, Legionnaire
- Steve DeFrisco
- David Fox: Rescue on Fractalus!
- Jon Freeman & Anne Westfall
- Gary Gilbertson
- Marc Goodman: The Bilestoad
- Dan Gorlin: Choplifter
- Tom Griner
- Steve Hales: Fort Apocalypse
- John Harris
- Eugene Jarvis
- David Lubar
- Scott Ludwig
- Archer Maclean
- Jeff Minter
- Brian Moriarty
- Doug Neubauer: Star Raiders, Solaris
- Philip Price
- Warren Robinett: Adventure
- Ed Rotberg: Battlezone, Blasteroids, S.T.U.N. Runner
- Warren Schwader: Sammy Lightfoot
- Paul Shirley: Spindizzy
- Tim Skelly

== See also ==
- Coders at Work
