= The Pharaoh's Curse (video game) =

1983 video game

- Publishers: Synapse Software; HES (VIC)
- Designer: Steve Coleman
- Programmers: Atari 8-bit Steve Coleman; Commodore 64; Jason Hyatt; VIC-20; Alick Dziabczenko
- Platforms: Atari 8-bit, Commodore 64, VIC-20
- Release: 1983
- Genre: Platform
- Mode: Single-player

The Pharaoh's Curse is a platform adventure game written by Steve Coleman and published by Synapse Software in 1983 for Atari 8-bit computers. It was ported to the Commodore 64 and VIC-20, with the VIC version published by Human Engineered Software. Coleman also wrote Rainbow Walker for Synapse, published the same year.

The player attempts to collect 16 treasures from an Egyptian tomb while avoiding the pharaoh, his mummy, and various traps. John Szczepaniak, writing for GamesTM magazine, called The Pharaoh's Curse an early example of what later became known as the Metroidvania genre.

== Gameplay ==
The hero waits at the top of the screen for a trap to return into the ground before retrieving the treasure to the right. The Pharaoh is at the bottom, the Winged Avenger to the right of the treasure.

The Pharaoh's Curse world is a 16 cave-like rooms in a 4 by 4 layout, using the flip screen technique of moving between them.

The game opens with the player on a title screen, and they start the game by running onto the entrance, a pit, and falling into the tombs below. The player can drop any distance without harm, and can climb back up on the ropes or elevator-like moving platforms that appear on most screens. Each of the rooms contains one of 16 treasures, which provide an extra life when they are retrieved. A display along the top of the screen indicates which treasures still had to be collected.

While playing, two opponents appear regularly, the pharaoh and the mummy, which then chase the player. The player can shoot them, and they both shoot back at a much slower rate. Traps in the map, triggered by walking over visible triggers, tend to be more dangerous. Some triggers are positioned on the tops of elevators or the bottom of drops, making fast action required. Some of the rooms are sealed from each other using magic gates. These can be opened with keys that appear randomly around the map. Lastly, there is a flying creature, the Winged Avenger, which picks the player on contact, carries him through the screens and drops him somewhere. The Avenger can carry the player to areas that are otherwise unavailable due to the layout or a lack of keys.

Once all treasures have been collected, the player must escape back to the starting screen. Subsequently, they receive a level password and the game restarts in a higher of the four difficulty levels.

== Reception ==
Antic gave the game a favorable review, saying "Pharaoh's Curse will appeal to all computerists and gamesters... It's another winner from Synapse." HI-Res said "This Tutankham takeoff is marvelous and the Joystick capability is magnificent." Personal Computer Games gave the VIC-20 version an 8 out of 10 rating, saying "The basic idea behind Pharaoh's Curse isn't particularly new, but there are enough original touches to give a unique feel to the game. The program is visually attractive, easy to grasp, and great fun to play." They later awarded it the title of VIC-20 game of the year.
