= Claim Jumper (video game) =

1982 action video game

- Cover art by Tim Boxell
- Publisher: Synapse Software
- Designer: Gray Chang
- Platform: Atari 8-bit
- Release: 1982

Claim Jumper is a video game written by Gray Chang for Atari 8-bit computers and published by Synapse Software in 1982. It is primarily designed as a two-player competitive game, but includes a separate shoot 'em up mode for either one or two players.

== Gameplay ==
Claim Jumper is a game in which the player is a cowboy collecting gold bars.

== Development ==
Gray Chang previously wrote the two-player competitive game Dog Daze for the Atari Program Exchange. After Claim Jumper, he designed two more games for two simultaneous players: Dog Daze Deluxe and Bumpomov's Dogs.

Chang kept a notebook while writing Claim Jumper which contains nearly 200 pages of code, flowcharts, technical details, and graph paper sketches of the game art.

In-game screenshot

== Reception ==
Allen Doum reviewed the game for Computer Gaming World, and stated that "The graphics and animation in Claim Jumper are very good but, while there are sound cues for most game actions, the sounds are not very imaginative. There aren't many interactively competitive two player arcade-style games, so it is nice to see a company like Synapse release a game like Claim Jumper which fills that need so nicely."
