= Encounter! (video game) =

1983 video game

- Publishers: Novagen Software; Synapse Software; Atlantis Software
- Designer: Paul Woakes
- Platforms: Atari 8-bit, Commodore 64, Amiga, Atari ST
- Release: NA: 1983; WW: 1984
- Genre: Shoot 'em up

Encounter! is a first person shoot 'em up video game released in 1983 for Atari 8-bit computers and Commodore 64. It was programmed by Paul Woakes who co-founded Novagen Software to publish it in the UK and Europe. Synapse Software released the game in North America. Encounter! is similar to Atari, Inc.'s 1980 arcade game Battlezone, but with much faster gameplay and large, sometimes screen-filling, scaled bitmaps instead of wireframe models.

It was re-released by Atlantis Software for the Atari 8-bit and Commodore 64 as a cassette budget title. Versions for the Amiga and Atari ST computers followed much later, in 1991.

== Gameplay ==
A blue sphere fired by the enemy saucer in the distance is heading toward the player.

The goal of Encounter! is to eliminate all of the enemy saucers and kamikaze drones in a flat level. Enemies appear one at a time, highlighted on the radar below the main view, and a counter shows how many remain to complete the level. Pillars block shots and can be used for protection from enemy projectiles. When the enemy counter reaches zero, a portal opens containing obstacles to avoid reaching the next level. There are three difficulty settings.

== Development ==
Encounter! was the first game written by Paul Woakes. With his own company Novagen Software not founded yet, he was looking for a publisher. In 1983, he called Bruce Jordan who was owner of the Birmingham Atari Centre and asked him he would be interested in helping him publish Encounter!. Bruce Jordan agreed, and Novagen Software was formed (initially as Paul Woakes's own company and Bruce Jordan's company was engaged on a 'percentage' for publication, sales and distribution on Novagen's behalf). Encounter! was released early 1984, and it did sell well, with the Atari version charted higher and longer than the Commodore 64 version, although C64 did extremely well in Germany.

== Reception ==
Reception

Review scores
Publication	Score
Your Commodore	4/5
Amiga Joker	57%

Your Commodore gave the game four out of five stars praising the game's level of difficulty and available environments along with appreciating the sound effects which indicate when difficult enemies are going to attack. In 1991, the game was converted to the Amiga. However, the gameplay was outdated, and Amiga Joker gave it a mediocre score of 57%, stating that it was good enough for a short play from time to time.

A retrospective review in Retro Gamer stated: "Playing out the mechanics of Battlezone at what seems like a thousand miles per hour, and with filled, solid objects zooming in and out of the screen, Encounter! was (and still is) a technical marvel".
