= Rainbow Walker =

1983 video game

- Cover art by Tim Boxell
- Developer(s): Synapse Software
- Publisher(s): Synapse Software
- Designer(s): Steve Coleman
- Platform(s): Atari 8-bit, Commodore 64
- Release: 1983: Atari 8-bit 1984: C64
- Genre(s): Action
- Mode(s): Single-player

Rainbow Walker is an action game designed by Steve Coleman for Atari 8-bit computers and published by Synapse Software in 1983. A Commodore 64 port followed. The player hops along a rainbow, changing monochromatic squares to color, while avoiding dangerous creatures and gaps in the surface. Coloring the entire rainbow ends the level. There are bonus rounds between levels.

The Atari version was part of a "Double Play" promotion, where some Synapse games had a second, complete game on the other side of the diskette. The Double Play re-release of Rainbow Walker includes the game Countdown by Ken Rose. Coleman also wrote another game published by Synapse in 1983, The Pharaoh's Curse.

== Gameplay ==
Coloring the rainbow at night. Cedrick is on the rightmost arc.

The player controls a small creature named Cedrick who hops on a flat rainbow curving into the screen, giving a pseudo 3D quality to the game. The rainbow consists of 8 arcs, each of which contains 16 squares. Hopping along an arc scrolls the rainbow and eventually wraps around to the starting square. Each level omits some parts of this grid to make it more challenging. At the start of each round the squares are gray, and moving onto them adds color. The goal is to color the entire rainbow.

Falling off the rainbow costs one life. Holding the button while moving jumps over a square.

Other creatures attempt to change the squares back to gray or to knock Cedrick off the rainbow. A shooting star moves along an arc then drops Cedrick off, possibly in a location without a square. A demon bird carries Cedrick into the clouds and undoes all of the coloring in the level. Fragile squares break if Cedrick stands on them for too long. One offensive opportunity is that if Cedrick steps on a fragile square, then it stops creatures moving for a few seconds during which time they can be stomped on and eliminated. The freeze effect is cancelled if the rainbow scrolls.

There are twenty levels in all, with bonus stages between them, and then the game ends. After reaching level five, it is possible to start a new game at that level, though only in the current play session. In the bonus round, the player must stay on a short chain of squares which moves in four directions. Points are awarded for how long the player lasts without falling.

== Reception ==
In a 1984 Antic review, Andrew Bell wrote, "Rainbow Walker, Synapse Software's latest arcade-style game, joins the company's previous games as one of the most imaginative, graphically stimulating and playable games on the market." Tracie Forman of Electronic Games called Rainbow Walker "especially ear-pleasing” and concluded, "a pleasant game that has a way of growing on the player." In a review for InfoWorld, Scott Mace wrote, "as I played, I grew more and more infatuated with the game. Then it became an obsession. Finally, it had my respect". SoftSide called it "an artistic masterpiece and a lot of fun to play."

In 2014, Retro Gamer included Rainbow Walker on a list of the top ten Atari 8-bit computer games.
