= Fast Lane (video game) =

1987 video game

- Developer: Konami
- Publisher: Konami
- Designer: Masaaki Kukino
- Platform: Arcade
- Release: 1987
- Genre: Racing
- Modes: Single-player, multiplayer

Fast Lane is a 1987 racing arcade video game developed and published by Konami. It is a clone of Sega's Head On from 1979 with improved graphics and some additional features. The player controls a red sports car that attempts to avoid crashing head on with a blue truck.
