= Protector II =

1982 video game

- Publisher: Synapse Software
- Designer: Mike Potter
- Programmers: Atari 8-bit Mike Potter; Commodore 64; Ken Rose; TRS-80 CoCo; Robert Black
- Platforms: Atari 8-bit, Commodore 64, TI-99/4A, TRS-80 Color Computer
- Release: 1982: Atari; 1983: C64, CoCo
- Genre: Scrolling shooter

Protector II is a video game written by Mike Potter for Atari 8-bit computers and published by Synapse Software in 1982. It is a sequel to 1981's Protector; both games are horizontally scrolling shooters inspired by the arcade video game Defender. Protector II was ported to the Commodore 64, TI-99/4A, and TRS-80 Color Computer.

== Gameplay ==
Protector II is a game in which the player uses a needlefighter ship to rescue people while their city is being attacked by aliens.

== Reception ==
Allen Doum reviewed the game for Computer Gaming World:

The graphics are good, and the sound, animation and scrolling are very well done. Play may begin with either three or five ships at any of six difficulty levels —although I doubt that anyone is expected to play at the higher levels. Even at the lower levels, Protector II moves fast enough that most players won't have time to realize that what they're doing doesn't make much sense.
