= Head On (video game) =

1979 video game

- North American flyer
- Developer: Sega/Gremlin
- Publishers: JP: Sega; NA/EU: Sega/Gremlin
- Designer: Lane Hauck
- Platforms: Arcade, Commodore 64, VIC-20, Game Boy, PC-8801, Sharp MZ
- Release: Head On: JP: April 1979; NA: June 1979; EU: August 1979; Head On Part II: JP: October 1979; NA: November 1979
- Genre: Maze
- Modes: Single-player, multiplayer
- Arcade system: Dual

Head On is an arcade video game developed by Sega/Gremlin and released by Sega in 1979. It was the first maze video game where the goal is to run over dots. Designed by Lane Hauck at Sega/Gremlin in the United States, it was the fourth highest-grossing arcade game of 1979 in both Japan and the US.

Sega released a sequel, Head On Part II, later the same year. The original inspired a number of clones, as well as Namco's Rally-X (1980).

== Gameplay ==
Arcade screenshot

Two cars continuously drive forward through rectangular channels in a simple maze. At the four cardinal directions are gaps where a car can change lanes. The player goal is to collect all dots in the maze while avoiding collisions with the computer-controlled car that is travelling in the opposite direction.

== Development ==
The game was developed by Sega/Gremlin in the United States, designed by Lane Hauck. He brainstormed the concept in 1978, roughly around the time that Sega purchased Gremlin Industries. After the acquisition, veteran Sega engineer Shikanosuke Ochi had a look at a prototype of Head On and suggested a change. Originally, the rounds in Head On were dictated by a timer as most games of the 1970s were, but Taito's Space Invaders introduced the concept of lives. Ochi suggested to Hauck that he should get rid of the timer and replace it with a lives system, which Hauck implemented and later said was "key to making the game big".

The game has two different orientations for horizontal and vertical monitors. In Japan, the game was released with a vertical orientation to suit the cocktail table arcade cabinets popular in Japan. In the US, the game was displayed horizontally inside of a standard upright cabinet.

== Reception ==
Head On was a commercial success in arcades. In Japan, it became Gremlin's most successful export and a highly influential game in the period after the Space Invaders boom. It was Japan's fourth highest-grossing arcade game of 1979, below Space Invaders, Galaxian and Sega's Monaco GP. Head On was also the fourth highest-earning arcade video game of 1979 in the United States, below Space Invaders, Football and Sprint 2.

== Legacy ==
Head On's relation to Pac-Man (1980) as a game about collecting dots inside of a maze-like structure has been noted by commentators and historians. Though there has not been direct confirmation on its influence, the importance of Head On in Japan around the time of Pac-Man's development suggests a correlation between the two. Several evolutions on the Head On formula released in 1979 including Space Chaser (1979) and Car Hunt (1979) bear further resemblance to Pac-Man.

Ports of Head On for the Commodore 64 and VIC-20 were released in 1982. In Japan, the game was released for the PC-8801 and Sharp MZ computers. Head On later appeared in the Sega Saturn collection Sega Memorial Selection Vol.1 and in the PlayStation 2 collection Sega Ages Vol. 23.

=== Sequels ===
A sequel was released the same year as the original: Head On 2 (1979), also known as Head On Part II. The sequel added side lanes which let the car turn itself around and more complex AI.

Sega's Car Hunt (1979), informally known as Head On III, added elements to the game such as a more complex maze, elevated roadways, the ability to turn in any direction, and enemy vehicles of varying aggression towards the player. The SG-1000 game Pacar took elements of Car Hunt and merged them with Pac-Man.

During the 1990s, a remake of Head On, titled Dottori-kun, was included with various Sega arcade cabinets to comply with Japanese regulations requiring arcade cabinets to come with a game. As it was only made to meet legal requirements, the game was designed to run on extremely cheap hardware, and for the arcade operator to discard it and replace it with a different title.

A mobile phone version of Head On was released exclusively in Japan through the Sonic Cafe, Puyo Puyo Sega, and Sega Ages portal during the 2000s.

=== Clones ===
Crash (1979) by Exidy was announced a month after Head On was released in the United States. This led to Sega/Gremlin contacting Exidy and having the game discontinued. Despite this, Crash was the seventh highest-grossing arcade game of 1979 in the United States and Exidy followed it up with similar games such as Targ (1980).

Licensed clones were developed based on Head-On in Japan. Licensees included Irem and Nintendo who modified and released their version as Head On N (ヘッド・オン・Ｎ, Heddo On N).

Namco's Rally-X was heavily inspired by Head On. Konami's Fast Lane arcade game, released in 1987, highly resembles Head On with improved graphics and some additional features.

Head On proved a popular concept to clone for home systems. Clones include Tunnels of Fahad for the TRS-80, Car Wars for the TI-99/4A, Killer Car for Spectravideo, Car Chase for the ZX Spectrum, Dodge 'Em for the Atari 2600, and Dodge Racer for Atari 8-bit computers. The number of lanes in these games varies from 3 to 6.
