= Fort Apocalypse =

1982 video game

- UK edition, cover art by Tim Boxell
- Developer: Synapse Software
- Publishers: Synapse Software; U.S. Gold
- Designer: Steve Hales
- Programmers: Atari 8-bit Steve Hales; Commodore 64; Joe Vierra
- Platforms: Atari 8-bit, Commodore 64
- Release: 1982
- Genre: Scrolling shooter
- Mode: Single-player

Fort Apocalypse is a multidirectional scrolling shooter for Atari 8-bit computers created by Steve Hales and published by Synapse Software in 1982. Joe Vierra ported it to the Commodore 64 the same year. In the game, the player flies a helicopter through an underground prison, avoiding or shooting enemies and saving prisoners. A contemporary of Choplifter, it has similarities to that game as well as the arcade games Scramble and Super Cobra.

== Gameplay ==
Fort Apocalypse is played within a multi-directional scrolling "cave", viewed from the side. Similar to Choplifter, and in contrast to Scramble, the map scrolls as the player moves in any direction.

Some prisoners to rescue

The map is divided into four vertical sections, with the uppermost being at ground level, and the lowest containing the titular fortress. The two middle layers, Draconis and the Crystalline Caves, both contain a landing pad checkpoint. Eight hostages can be picked up on both of these middle layers. The map is further divided into sections by special walls that can be broken open by firing or dropping bombs on them.

The player's chopper is destroyed if it runs into the cavern walls, is shot down by the numerous enemies, or caught in one of the many laser or moving wall traps. The player has two weapons, a gun and bombs, but only one button on the joystick. The button usually fires the gun, but when the helicopter faces out of the screen, the button drops bombs. Enemy missiles track the player's movements for a short time before running out of fuel and dropping back to earth, and the map is populated by a number of enemy helicopters similar to the player's own.

== Development ==
Most of the basic concepts of Synapse's games were developed by the company's president, Ihor Wolosenko. Fort Apocalypse was one of the few that was not, and traces its origin to a dream Steve Hales had about helicopters. With Wolosenko's blessing, he began working on the project in 1982. He took part of his inspiration from the movie Blue Thunder.

While the programming was getting started, another programmer decided to leave the company in the midst of completing one of Wolosenko's projects, Slime. Hales was pulled off the development of Fort Apocalypse to finish Slime, but found the code too difficult to continue and had to start over from scratch. The resulting delay meant Broderbund's Choplifter reached the market first, and Fort Apocalypse was often considered a me-too effort. When Hales saw Choplifter, his reaction was: "Why did I stop working on Fort?"

The game was publicly demonstrated at the Consumer Electronics Show (Note: Hales says this was the 1983 show, which took place in January. This would appear to suggest the actual release was later, or that this led to a second version.) and the players complained that it was too hard. This led to changes in the map and a few other tweaks.

== Reception ==
The game was a relative success, ultimately selling about 75,000 copies on the Atari, and more than that on the Commodore.

Softline praised Fort Apocalypse's "game complexity and difficulty of play—just enough to keep you coming back and progressing a little further each time". Antic was also pleased with the effort: "The game is fun to play and has lots of action and good sound effects" but criticized the sound of the helicopter itself, comparing it to the sound of "someone walking in wet shoes". Also noting the game's difficulty, The Commodore 64 Home Companion called the graphics and sound "impressive". Electronic Fun disliked it, giving the game only 1.5 joysticks out of 5. It is also one of the most direct at calling it a mix of other designs; the review starts off with this complaint:

What happens when you mix Defender, Scramble and Chopper Rescue together, and put them out as one game? About the same thing as mixing ice cream, spaghetti and steak. By themselves they're each terrific, but when mixed together they make something that you don't even want to think about. This is what happened in Fort Apocalypse.

It goes on to complain that anyone playing it would have to be "deeply masochistic", especially after the players "blow up after running into something you can't even see".

== Legacy ==
In 2007 the game was relicensed to a CC BY-NC-ND 2.5 Creative Commons license and released on IgorLabs, a site founded by Steve Hales and other game developers.

In April 2015, Steve Hales released the assembler source code to Fort Apocalypse on GitHub, also under CC BY-NC-ND 2.5, for historical reasons. A Twitter account for the release claimed "if enough people followed a version for iOS and Android would be made".
