= List of Atari 8-bit computer games =

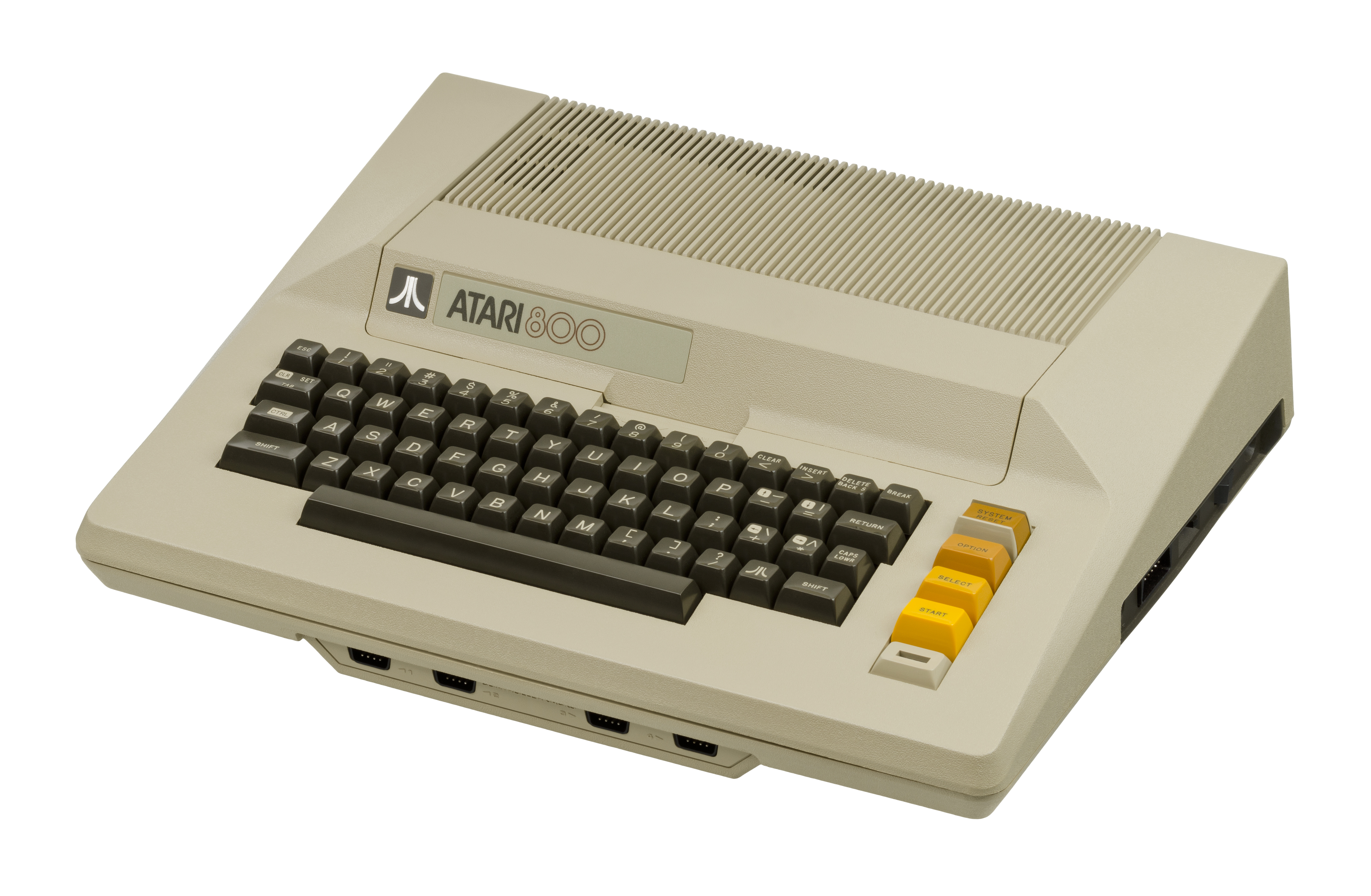
The Atari 800

This is a list of commercial video game titles released for Atari 8-bit computers, sorted alphabetically.

0–9 · A · B · C · D · E · F · G · H · I · J · K · L · M · N · O · P · Q · R · S · T · U · V · W · X · Y · Z

There are 2180 games on this list.

Title	Year	Publisher
0° Nord	1985	Ariolasoft (Germany)
180	1986	Mastertronic (UK)
2030 Radio Killers	1986	Lago Sistema
221B Baker Street	1987	Datasoft
26 Juegos	1984	Unimport
3-D Noughts and Crosses	1984	Ad Astra
3-D Pac Plus	1989	Secret Games
3-D Red Baron	1980	Sebree's Computing
3-D Tic-Tac-Toe (Adventure International)	1981	Adventure International
3-D Tic-Tac-Toe (Atari)	1980	Atari
50 Mission Crush	1984	Strategic Simulations, Inc.
5x5	1995	Sikor Soft
747 Flight Simulator	1983	DACC Ltd.
747 Flug-Simulator	1981	Atari Elektronik
747 Landing Simulator	1981	APX
A-Zone	1989	B.Ware
A.E.	1982	Brøderbund Software
ABC	1995	Sikor Soft
Abenteuer im Weltraum	1984	Atari Elektronik
Abracadabra!	1983	TG Software
Abraxas Adventure #1 - Assault on the Astral Rift	1984	MMG Micro Software
Ace of Aces	1987	Accolade
Acey-Deucey (L & S Computerware)	1982	L & S Computerware
Acey-Deucey (Softsmith)	1982	Softsmith
ACLS Protocols	1987	Mad Scientist Software
Acrobat		Münzenloher GmbH
Action Biker	1986	Mastertronic (UK)
Action Quest	1982	JV Software
AD 2044	1991	LK Avalon
Adax	1992	LK Avalon
Advanced Air Traffic Controller	1981	Creative Computing Software
Advanced Pinball Simulator	1989	Code Masters
Adventure "Telephone"	1986	Tearsoft
Adventure Alpha	1984	Milliken
Adventure in Time	1983	Phoenix Software
Adventure No. 1 - Adventureland (Text edition)	1981	Adventure International
Adventure No. 3 - Mission Impossible	1981	Adventure International
Adventure No. 4 - Voodoo Castle	1981	Adventure International
Adventure No. 5 - The Count	1981	Adventure International
Adventure No. 6 - Strange Odyssey	1981	Adventure International
Adventure No. 7 - Mystery Fun House	1981	Adventure International
Adventure No. 8 - Pyramid of Doom	1981	Adventure International
Adventure No. 9 - Ghost Town	1981	Adventure International
Adventure No. 10 - Savage Island - Part I	1981	Adventure International
Adventure No. 11 - Savage Island - Part II	1981	Adventure International
Adventure No. 13 - The Sorcerer of Claymorgue Castle	1981	Adventure International
Adventure of the Month No. 1 - Arabian Adventure	1981	SoftSide Publications
Adventure of the Month No. 5 - Crime Adventure	1981	SoftSide Publications
Adventure of the Month No. 7 - Black Hole Adventure	1981	SoftSide Publications
Adventure of the Month No. 7 - Klondike Adventure	1982	SoftSide Publications
Adventure on a Boat	1981	SubLOGIC
Adventure Quest	1983	Level 9 Computing
Adventure! (Creative Computing Software)	1980	Creative Computing Software
Adventures of Buckaroo Banzai (The)	1985	Adventure International
Adventures of Robin Hood (The)	1984	English Software Company
Aerobics	1984	Spinnaker Software
AffenJagd	1985	Europa Computer-Club
African Safari	1986	Antic Software
After Pearl	1984	SUPERware
Agent USA	1984	Scholastic, Inc.
Air Raid!	1982	APX
Air Rescue	1991	Atlantis Software
Air Rescue I	1984	MicroProse Software
Air Support	1984	Synapse Software
Airball	1988	Atari
Airline (Adventure International)	1982	Adventure International
Airline (Ariolasoft (Germany))	1985	Ariolasoft (Germany)
Airstrike	1982	English Software Company
Airstrike II	1983	English Software Company
Airwolf	1985	Elite
Akanis Ula	1987	Pressimage
Alchemia	1993	Mirage Software
Alchemist	1983	Aim Software
ALF in the Color Caves	1984	Spinnaker Software
Alfa-Boot	1994	StanBit
Ali Baba and the Forty Thieves	1981	Quality Software
Aliants	1987	TDC Distributors
Alien Ambush	1982	Micro D
Alien Attack	1983	ALA Software
Alien Blast	1993	Dean Garraghty Software
Alien Egg	1981	APX
Alien Garden	1982	Epyx
Alien Hell	1981	Syncro, Inc.
Alien Swarm	1982	Inhome Software
Alienbusters	1991	Blackfire! Software
Aliens - Genocide	1992	Artacyis Software
All Star Baseball	1979	Image Computer Products
Alley Cat	1983	Synapse Software
Alp Man	1983	Sar-An Computer Products
Alpha Shield	1983	Sirius Software
Alptraum	1987	R+E Software
Alternate Reality: The City	1985	Datasoft
Alternate Reality: The Dungeon	1987	Datasoft
Alvin	1982	Dynacomp
Amaurote	1987	Mastertronic (UK)
Ambulance		Aim Software
Amphibian!		Business Data Center
Amulet (The)	1990	Tiara Software
Android (LK Avalon)	1993	LK Avalon
Android Attack	1982	Pretzelland Software
Andromeda	1982	Gebelli Software
Andromeda Conquest	1982	Avalon Hill
Anduril	1989	KE-Soft
Angle Worms / Crolon Diversion	1980	Adventure International
Ankh	1984	Datamost, Inc.
Anteater (Romox)	1982	Romox
Anthill	1981	APX
Anti-Sub Patrol	1983	Roklan
Antquest	1990	KE-Soft
Apple Panic	1982	Brøderbund Software
Aquatron	1983	Sierra On-Line
Arcade Bonanza	1985	Keypunch Software
Arcade Classics - Seawolf II / Gun Fight	1983	Epyx
Arcade Fruit Machine	1990	Zeppelin Games
Archers (The)	1986	Mosaic Publishing
Archon II: Adept	1984	Electronic Arts
Archon: The Light and the Dark	1983	Electronic Arts
Ardeny 1944	1995	StanBit
Ardy the Aardvark	1983	Datamost, Inc.
Arena	1982	Med Systems Software
Arex	1983	Adventure International
Arkanoid	1987	Imagine
Armor Assault	1982	Epyx
Around the Planet	1994	Mirage Software
Around the World	1983	SUPERware
Artefakt Przodkow	1992	ASF
Artillery (Mosaic Electronics)	1980	Mosaic Electronics
Ashido	1990	KE-Soft
Assassin's Cove	1983	ALA Software
Assault Force 3-D	1984	Microbits Peripheral Products, Inc.
Asteroid Miners	1982	MMG Micro Software
Asteroids	1981	Atari
Astra Phantasm	1983	Ad Astra
Astro Chase	1982	First Star Software
Astro-Droid	1987	Red Rat Software
Astro-Quotes	1980	PDI
Astromeda	1987	Rino Marketing
Astron IV	1982	Syncro, Inc.
Astron IX	1982	Cosmi
Astrowarriors	1982	Apogee Software
Asylum	1983	Screenplay
Atari Energie	1984	Atari Benelux
Atari Safari (CDS Corporation)	1980	CDS Corporation
Atari Safari (Illusion Software)	1985	Illusion Software
Atari Trivia Data Base	1984	Howard W. Sams and Company, Inc.
Atari-Socoban	1988	Compysoft
AtariOracle	1985	Antic Software
Atlantis (Imagic)	1983	Imagic
Atlantis Conflict	1983	K-Tek Software
Atom Smasher	1982	CCP
Atomia	1993	Mirage Software
Atomics	1990	Liberal Dreams Software
Atomit II	1992	KE-Soft
Atomix Plus	1993	Blackfire! Software
Attack at EP-CYG-4	1982	Romox
Attack of the Mutant Camels	1983	HesWare
Attank!	1981	APX
Aunt Prunelda's Inheritance	1984	Market Directions
Aurum	1993	LK Avalon
Ausserirdischen (Die)	1990	KE-Soft
Autoduel	1985	Origin Systems
Avalanche	1981	APX
Avoid	1980	Computer Magic Ltd.
Axilox	1993	Mirage Software
Axis Assassin	1983	Electronic Arts
Aztec	1982	Datamost, Inc.
Aztec Challenge	1982	Cosmi
B-1 Nuclear Bomber	1981	Avalon Hill
B.C.'s Quest for Tires	1983	Sierra On-Line
Babel	1981	APX
Baccarat	1981	Dynacomp
Backgammon (Dynacomp)		Dynacomp
Backgammon (TK Computer Products)		TK Computer Products
Bagels Supreme		JMH Software of Minnesota
Baja Buggies	1982	Gamestar
Balance / Tricky Dices	1984	UserSoft
Ball-Cracker	1991	Secret Games
Ballblazer	1987	Atari
Ballistic Interceptor	1983	K-Tek Software
Balloon Pop	1986	White Bag Software
Balloon Pop / Pylon Racer	1981	Sebree's Computing
Ballyhoo	1986	Infocom
Bandits	1982	Sirius Software
Bang! Bank!	1992	Mirage Software
Bannercatch	1984	Scholastic, Inc.
Banzai	1995	Mirage Software
Barahir	1993	LK Avalon
Barbarian	1993	LK Avalon
Barge	1983	K-Tek Software
Barkonid	1986	MHS
Barnstorm	1986	White Bag Software
Barnyard Blaster	1987	Atari
Baseball (Aim Software)	1982	Aim Software
Baseball (Inhome Software)	1983	Inhome Software
Baseball (Sears)	1979	Sears
Baseball's Best	1983	Windcrest Software
Basil the Great Mouse Detective	1987	Gremlin Graphics
Basketball (1978 video game)	1979	Atari
Battalion Commander	1985	Strategic Simulations, Inc.
Battle for Normandy	1982	Strategic Simulations, Inc.
Battle of Antietam	1985	Strategic Simulations, Inc.
Battle Ships	1989	Mirage Software
Battle Trek	1982	Voyager Software
Battle Warp	1980	West Coast Software
Battlecruiser	1987	Strategic Simulations, Inc.
Battlezone	1987	Atari
Battling Tanks	1980	Sebree's Computing
Batty Builders	1983	English Software Company
Bawdy Adventure in the Magic Caverns	1981	Computer Products International
Beach Head	1984	Access Software
Beach Head II: The Dictator Strikes Back	1986	Access Software
Beach Landing	1984	Weekly Reader Family Software
Beamrider	1984	Activision
Bean Machine (The)	1983	APX
Beat the Beatles	1983	Interactive Software
Beer Belly Burt's Brew Biz	1986	Americana
Bellum	1983	APX
Beneath Apple Manor	1983	Quality Software
Beneath the Pyramids	1981	Crystalware
Bermuda Experience	1982	Crystalware
Berserker Raids	1983	BAEN Enterprises
Bertyx	1992	Mirage Software
Beta Fighter	1982	Artworx
Beta Lyrae - Kampfstern der Galaktik	1985	Happy Software
Bewitch Castle (The)	1989	PM Software
Beyond Castle Wolfenstein	1984	MUSE Software
Big Bird's Funhouse	1984	CBS Software
Big Bird's Special Delivery	1984	CBS Software
Bilbo	1986	AMC-Verlag
Bilder Puzzle	1984	Europa Computer-Club
Billiards	1981	Creative Computing Software
Bio-Defense	1984	Tymac, Inc.
Birth of the Phoenix	1982	Phoenix Software
Bismarck: The North Sea Chase	1988	Datasoft
Bismark	1983	ASP Software
Black Forest (The)	1982	SubLOGIC
Black Jack - Siebzehn und Vier	1991	User-Mag
Black Lamp	1989	Atari UK
Black Out	1984	Europa Computer-Club
Blackhawk	1986	Orion Software
Blackjack (Atari)	1983	Atari
Blackjack Casino	1981	APX
Blackjack Tutor	1981	APX
BlastCom	1989	Sardaker Software
Blinky's Scary School	1990	Zeppelin Games
Block Buster	1981	APX
Block'em	1982	APX
Blockaboo!	1990	Aussemware
Blockade (Artworx)		Artworx
Blockade (Europa Computer-Club)	1984	Europa Computer-Club
Blue Max	1983	Synapse Software
Blue Max 2001	1984	Synapse Software
Blue Team Bridge	1985	Antic Software
Blue Thunder	1984	Richard Wilcox Software
BMX Simulator	1986	Code Masters
Boa Constrictor	1983	Aim Software
Body Parts	1983	PartlySoft Software
Boing! II	1992	Tiger Developments
Bomb	1992	KE-Soft
Bomb Fusion	1989	Mastertronic (UK)
Bomb Hunter	1982	Channel 8 Software
Bombastic!	1983	English Software Company
Bombay	1994	ESC
Bomber Attack	1982	Avalon Hill
Bomber Jack	1991	KE-Soft
Bootleg	1983	APX
Bop'n Wrestle	1986	Mindscape
Borderline	1983	RBR & MBR
Boulder Dash	1984	First Star Software
Boulder Dash Construction Kit	1986	Epyx
Boulder Dash II	1985	First Star Software
Boulders and Bombs	1982	CBS Software
Bounty Bob Strikes Back!	1984	Big Five Software
Bowling I	1981	PDI
Brain Strainers	1983	Carousel Software
Brainstorm		Aim Software
Breakthrough in the Ardennes	1984	Strategic Simulations, Inc.
Brian Clough's Football Fortunes	1987	CDS Software
Bridge 3.0		Artworx
Bridge 4.0	1983	Artworx
Bridge 5.0	1988	Artworx
Bridge Crosser		PI Software
Bridge Master	1982	Dynacomp
BridgePro	1983	Computer Management Corporation
Brimstone	1985	Synapse Software
Bristles	1983	First Star Software
Broadsides	1983	Strategic Simulations, Inc.
Bruce Lee	1984	US Gold
Brundles (The)	1993	KE-Soft
Bubble Trouble	1986	Players
Buck Rogers: Planet of Zoom	1983	SEGA
Buddelmax	1984	QuelleSoft
Buffalo Stampede	1983	Aim Software
Bug Attack	1982	Cavalier Computer
Bug Hunt	1987	Atari
Bug Off!	1982	Adventure International
Bugrunner	1985	Isis Software
Bulldog Pinball	1982	Hayden Software
Bumper Pool	1981	APX
Bumperball	1982	London Software
Bumpomov's Dogs	1983	APX
Burgers!	1983	APX
Buried Bucks	1982	ANALOG Software
Busy Baby	1984	Royale Software
Buzzword	1986	Buzzword Game Company (The)
C'est la Vie	1983	Adventure International
Cache-Cache de Mots	1982	Atari France
Cactus League Baseball	1982	Dynacomp
California Run	1988	Alternative Software
Caméléon	1985	Atari France
Can't Quit	1983	APX
Candy Factory	1982	Gebelli Software
Cannibals	1983	Calisto Software
Canyon Climber	1982	Datasoft
Captain Beeble	1983	Inhome Software
Captain Cosmo	1982	Nexa Corporation
Captain Gather	1992	LK Avalon
Captain Sticky's Gold	1983	English Software Company
Captivity	1981	PDI
Capture the Flag (ANALOG Computing)		ANALOG Computing
Capture the Flag (Sirius Software)	1983	Sirius Software
Cardiac Arrest!	1986	Mad Scientist Software
Carnival	1982	ANALOG Software
Carnival Massacre	1983	Creative Sparks
Carrier Force	1983	Strategic Simulations, Inc.
Casebook of Hemlock Soames #3 (The)		CodeWriter
Casebook of Hemlock Soames (The)		CodeWriter
Cash In		K-Tek Software
Casino Blackjack / Counter	1981	Manhattan Software
Casino Craps with Odds		Dynacomp
Casino Parlor Games		Main Street Publishing
Cassette 4	1984	Cascade Games Ltd.
Cassette 50	1984	Cascade Games Ltd.
Castle	1981	APX
Castle Assault	1986	Blue Ribbon Software
Castle Hassle	1983	Roklan
Castle Keeper	1983	ALA Software
Castle Top	1985	DBM Software
Castle Wolfenstein	1983	MUSE Software
Castles and Keys	1983	Romox
Cat-Nap	1982	ZiMAG
Catacombs of Baruth	1982	Surrealistek Software
Caterpiggle	1982	APX
Cavaliers	1984	K-Tek Software
Cavelord	1984	Ariolasoft (Germany)
Caveman (HC)	1986	HC
Caveman (Mirage Software)	1993	Mirage Software
Cavern Commander	1984	Scorpio Gamesworld Ltd.
Cavernia	1990	Zeppelin Games
Caverns	1982	Titan Programs
Caverns of Callisto	1983	Origin Systems
Caverns of Eriban	1986	Firebird (UK)
Caverns of Khafka	1983	Cosmi
Caverns of Mars	1981	APX
Caverunner	1983	English Software Company
Caves of Death	1982	Channel 8 Software
Caves of Rigel	1984	Silicon Joy
Cellar Terror	1983	ALA Software
Cells and Serpents	1983	ASP Software
Centipede	1982	Atari
Centrale Nucléaire		Atari France
Centurion	1981	APX
Centurion - Defender of Rome	1995	Sikor Soft
Chambers of Zorp	1983	APX
Championship Golf	1983	Hayden Software
Championship Lode Runner	1985	Brøderbund Software
Chancellor of the Exchequer (Mach-Ina Strategy Games)	1983	Mach-Ina Strategy Games
Change	1992	LK Avalon
Chase Games	1981	Creative Computing Software
Checker King (APX)	1982	APX
Checker King (Personal Software)	1980	Personal Software
Checkers (Odesta)	1982	Odesta
Checkers (Silicon Valley Systems)		Silicon Valley Systems
Chess	1983	Parker Brothers
Chess 7.0	1982	Odesta
Chessmaster 2000	1986	Software Country
Chicken	1982	Synapse Software
Chicken Chase	1986	Bug-Byte
Chicken Out	1983	ALA Software
Chiffres et des Lettres (Des)	1984	Atari France
Chimera	1985	Firebird (UK)
Chimère	1986	Pressimage
Chinese Puzzle	1981	APX
Chomp-Othello	1981	Dynacomp
Chomper	1981	MMG Micro Software
Chop Suey	1985	English Software Company
Choplifter (Brøderbund Software)	1982	Brøderbund Software
Choplifter! (Atari)	1988	Atari
Chopper Chase	1983	ALA Software
Chopper Hunt	1984	Imagic
Chopper Rescue	1982	MicroProse Software
Chuckie Egg	1985	A & F Software
Cimex Rex	1982	Bytrex Computer Systems
Circo Bianco	1987	Lindasoft
Citadel (The)		Tiger Developments
Citadel Warrior	1983	English Software Company
Claim Jumper	1982	Synapse Software
Clash - Ethereal	1988	Imagists Group (The)
Clash of Wills	1985	DKG
Classy Chassy	1987	Clearstar Softechnologies
Clear for Action	1984	Avalon Hill
Clipper	1983	PDI
Cloak of Death	1984	Argus Press Software Group
Clonus		Crystalware
Clonus II	1982	Crystalware
Close Assault	1982	Avalon Hill
Cloudburst	1983	DANA
Clowns and Balloons	1982	Datasoft
Coastal Invasion	1983	ALA Software
Cobra		Arrakis Systems, Inc.
Code Breaker	1981	PDI
Code Quest	1985	Sunburst Communications
Code-Woord	1985	Wolters Software
Codebreaker (Acorn Software)	1984	Acorn Software
Codecracker	1981	APX
Cohen's Towers	1983	Datamost, Inc.
Collapse	1985	Firebird (UK)
Collision Course	1982	ZiMAG
Colonial Conquest	1985	Strategic Simulations, Inc.
Colony	1987	Bulldog Software
Colony 7	1983	System 3 Software
Colossal Adventure	1983	Level 9 Computing
Colossus Chess 3.0	1984	English Software Company
Colossus Chess 4.0	1987	CDS Software
Colour Code	1984	AWG
Combat Chess	1984	Avalon Hill
Combat Leader	1983	Strategic Simulations, Inc.
Comet Game (The)	1986	Firebird (UK)
Commbat	1981	Adventure International
Compubridge		Artworx
Compute 4 / Reversi	1982	Thorn EMI (UK)
Computer Acquire		Avalon Hill
Computer Ambush	1984	Strategic Simulations, Inc.
Computer Baseball	1984	Strategic Simulations, Inc.
Computer Baseball Strategy	1982	Avalon Hill
Computer Chess	1979	Atari
Computer Chess / European Countries and Capitals	1985	Atari UK
Computer Command	1983	CS Software
Computer Crosswords - Dell	1984	Softie
Computer Crosswords - The New York Times - Volume 1	1984	Softie
Computer Crosswords - The New York Times - Volume 2	1984	Softie
Computer Facts in Five	1982	Avalon Hill
Computer Football Strategy	1983	Avalon Hill
Computer Quarterback	1984	Strategic Simulations, Inc.
Computer Stocks & Bonds	1982	Avalon Hill
Computer Title Bout	1984	Avalon Hill
Computer War	1983	Thorn EMI (UK)
Computer-Kran	1985	Europa Computer-Club
Computerized Perceptual Therapy - Auditory / Visual Integration	1990	AVT, Inc.
Computerized Perceptual Therapy - Computer Pegboard	1990	AVT, Inc.
Computerized Perceptual Therapy - Perceptual Speed	1993	AVT, Inc.
Computerized Perceptual Therapy - Tachistoscope	1990	AVT, Inc.
Computerized Perceptual Therapy - Visual Memory	1992	AVT, Inc.
Computerized Perceptual Therapy - Visual Sequential Processing	1989	AVT, Inc.
Computerized Perceptual Therapy - Visual Tracing	1989	AVT, Inc.
Computhello	1981	Dynacomp
Conan: Hall of Volta	1984	Datasoft
Concentration (ALA Software)	1983	ALA Software
Concentration (Manhattan Software)	1981	Manhattan Software
Concentration (Stack Computer Services)	1983	Stack Computer Services
Condensation	1983	ALA Software
Conflict 2500	1981	Avalon Hill
Congo Bongo	1983	SEGA
Conquering Everest	1983	ASP Software
Conquest of the Crown	1994	Lindasoft
Constellation	1992	LK Avalon
Controller	1982	Avalon Hill
Convicts (The)	1992	Domain Software
Cops 'n' Robbers	1988	Atlantis Software
Copter Chase	1983	K-Tek Software
Cosmic Balance II	1983	Strategic Simulations, Inc.
Cosmic Life	1983	Spinnaker Software
Cosmic Pirate	1989	Byte Back
Cosmic Tunnels	1983	Datamost, Inc.
Cosmos	1983	Dynacomp
Count Dracula	1983	Pelican Software
Crack-Up!	1989	Atlantis Software
Cranston Manor Adventure		Artworx
Craps Simulator	1984	Symsoft Enterprises
Crazy Chase	1982	Dynacomp
Crazy Cobra	1986	Illusion Software
Creature Adventure	1983	ALA Software
Creepers	1982	Silicon Valley Systems
Cribbage (APX)	1982	APX
Cribbage (Creative Computing Software)	1980	Creative Computing Software
Cribbage (THESIS)	1980	THESIS
Crime Buster	1988	Atari
Crisis Mountain	1982	Synergistic Software
Cromwell House	1985	Ariolasoft (Germany)
Cross-Town Crazy Eight	1988	XLEnt Software
Crossbow	1988	Atari
Crosscheck	1986	Datasoft
Crossfire (1981 video game)	1981	Sierra On-Line
Crossword Magic (Mindscape)	1985	Mindscape
Crown of Gold	1984	K-Tek Software
Crumble's Crisis	1987	Red Rat Software
Crusade in Europe	1985	MicroProse Software
Crush, Crumble and Chomp!	1981	Epyx
Crypt (The)	1982	Crystalware
Crypt of the Undead	1982	Epyx
Crypto Cube	1983	DesignWare, Inc.
Crypto-Mania	1987	White Bag Software
Crypts of Egypt	1994	Mirage Software
Crypts of Plumbous (The)	1982	Cosmi
Crypts of Terror	1981	Inhome Software
Crystal Castles	1988	Atari
Crystal Mine	1985	New Age Software
Crystal Raider	1986	Mastertronic (UK)
Cubemeister	1982	Syzygy Microware of Texas
Cubomagique	1984	Hatier
Cultivation / Chromatics	1990	KE-Soft
Culture Physique	1982	Atari France
Curse (The)	1992	LK Avalon
Cuthbert Goes Walkabout	1984	Microdeal
Cutthroats	1984	Infocom
Cyber Puzzle II	1983	Rampage Computer Products
Cybernome	1983	Leisure and Business Developments Ltd.
Cybor-Stien	1989	B.Ware
Cyborg (Sentient Software)	1982	Sentient Software
Cyborg (Sikor Soft)	1994	Sikor Soft
Cyborg Warrior	1990	Marcel Programming
Cycle Knight	1986	Artworx
Cyclod	1982	Sirius Software
Cygnus Senese		Aim Software
Cygnus X1	1989	Atari UK
Cypher Bowl	1981	ArtSci
Cytadela		ASF
Cytron Masters	1982	Strategic Simulations, Inc.
Cywilizacja	1993	Mirage Software
Czarny Orzel	1995	Krysal
Czaszki / Electra	1993	LK Avalon
Dagobar	1992	LK Avalon
Dambusters	1984	Electric Software Ltd.
Dampfmaschine	1985	Europa Computer-Club
Dan Strikes Back	1984	English Software Company
Dandy	1983	APX
Danger Crosswalk	1984	ALA Software
Danger Ranger	1984	Microdeal
Darg	1987	STV Software
Dark Abyss	1993	Mirage Software
Dark Chambers	1988	Atari
Darkness Hour	1992	LK Avalon
Darts (Blue Ribbon Software)	1986	Blue Ribbon Software
Darts (Creative Computing Software)	1981	Creative Computing Software
David's Midnight Magic	1982	Brøderbund Software
Dawn of Civilization	1984	SUPERware
Dawn Raider	1988	Atlantis Software
Day After (The)		Softwareladen
Day at the Races (A)	1985	Red Rat Software
Daylight Robbery	1988	Atlantis Software
Deadline (1982 video game)	1982	Infocom
Death Race	1987	Atlantis Software
DeathLand	1994	StanBit
Decathlon	1984	Activision
Decision in the Desert	1985	US Gold
Defender	1982	Atari
Defensor	1995	StanBit
Deflection / Simon Says	1980	Adventure International
Deimos	1993	Sonix Software
Deluxe Invaders	1981	Roklan
Demon Attack	1982	Imagic
Demon Knight	1983	ASP Software
Denis through the Drinking Glass	1984	Applications Software Specialities
Denk mit!		Europa Computer-Club
Descente à Ski		APX
Desert Falcon	1988	Atari
Desmond's Dungeon	1988	Alternative Software
Despatch Rider		Mastertronic (USA)
Destroyer Warship	1986	IntelaSoft
Detective	1983	ASP Software
Deuces Wild	1983	K-Tek Software
Devil's Dare	1983	Jay Gee Programming Company (The)
Devilator	1983	Zebra Co.
Diamond Hunter	1983	Dynacomp
Diamond Mine (Blue Ribbon Software)	1985	Blue Ribbon Software
Diamond Mine (Roklan)	1983	Roklan
Diamonds	1983	English Software Company
Dice Poker	1981	APX
Dig Dug	1982	Atari
Diggerbonk!	1982	APX
Digi Duck	1992	LK Avalon
Dimension X	1984	Synapse Software
Dizzy Dice	1987	Players
Dnieper River Line	1982	Avalon Hill
Dodge Racer	1981	Synapse Software
Dog Daze	1981	APX
Dog Daze Deluxe	1983	APX
Domain of the Undead	1986	Red Rat Software
Domination	1980	APX
Dominoes	1980	Creative Computing Software
Don Paint / Surround	1984	UserSoft
Donald	1992	KE-Soft
Donkey Kong	1983	Atari
Donkey Kong Jr.	1983	Atari
Dorado (El)	1983	Aim Software
Double Pack No. 1	1988	Red Rat Software
Down the Trench	1980	Sebree's Computing
Downhill	1981	APX
Dr. Goodcode's Cavern	1982	Gebelli Software
Dr. Mindwarp	1983	ALA Software
Drac Is Back	1981	Syncro, Inc.
Draconus	1988	Cognito
Drag	1989	KE-Soft
Dragon Defense	1983	K-Tek Software
Dragon Quest 3.14	1983	Midwest Computing
Dragon Quest or a Twist in the Tail	1985	Antic Software
Dragon's Eye	1981	Epyx
Dragon's Hideaway	1983	ALA Software
Dragon's Hunt	1982	Synergistic Software
Dragon's Keep	1984	Sierra On-Line
Dragonblast	1983	Dynacomp
Dragonriders of Pern	1983	Epyx
Draughts (Stack Computer Services)	1983	Stack Computer Services
Dreadnought	1990	Byte Back
Dredis	1989	KE-Soft
Drelbs	1983	Synapse Software
Driver's Seat	1983	Fluxion Enterprises
Droga Wojownika	1993	ASF
Droids	1983	TG Software
Drol	1983	Brøderbund Software
Drop It!	1993	Sonix Software
Dropzone	1984	US Gold
Druid	1987	Firebird (UK)
Dual Duel	1983	Microcraft Systems, Inc.
Ducks Ahoy!	1984	CBS Software
Duellin' Droid	1984	English Software Company
Dungeon Adventure	1983	Level 9 Computing
Dungeon Campaign	1980	Image Computer Products
Dungeon Duel	1982	C & C Software
Dungeons and Dragons - The Dungeon Master's Helper	1981	Kinetic Designs
Dungeons of Despair		Keypunch Software
Dungeons of Xotha	1986	HC
Dungeons, Dragons and Other Perils	1984	XLEnt Software
Dunjonquest - Curse of Ra	1982	Epyx
Dunjonquest - Danger in Drindisti	1982	Epyx
Dunjonquest - Hellfire Warrior	1982	Epyx
Dunjonquest - Morloc's Tower	1981	Epyx
Dunjonquest - Temple of Apshai	1982	Epyx
Dunjonquest - The Datestones of Ryn	1981	Epyx
Dunjonquest - The Keys of Acheron	1981	Epyx
Dunjonquest - Upper Reaches of Apshai	1982	Epyx
Dwie Wieze	1993	ASF
Dziedzictwo Gigantow	1993	Mirage Software
Déjà Vu	1985	Ariolasoft (Germany)
E Factor (The)	1983	Cosmi
E.T. Phone Home!	1983	Atari
Eagle Landing	1983	Aim Software
Eagles	1983	Strategic Simulations, Inc.
Eastern Front (1941)	1982	Atari
Easy Money / Honky	1993	LK Avalon
Eggard	1984	ScandSoft
Eggs	1981	Optimized Systems Software, Inc.
Einstein MemoryTrainer (The)	1983	Einstein Corporation (The)
Electric Starfish		Calisto Software
Electrician	1984	Synapse Software
Elektraglide	1985	English Software Company
Embargo	1982	Gebelli Software
Emerald Isle	1985	Level 9 Computing
Empire of the Over-Mind	1982	Avalon Hill
Emulator	1984	T & G Software
Enchanter	1983	Infocom
Encounter at Questar IV	1981	Artworx
Encounter!	1983	Synapse Software
Enemy Patrol	1983	ALA Software
Energy Czar	1980	Atari
Enigmatix!	1993	Page 6 Software
Enigme du Triangle (L')	1985	Atari France
Ennumereight	1983	APX
Epidemic!	1982	Strategic Simulations, Inc.
Equator	1983	PI Software
Equestrian	1983	APX
Eryus	1984	Klein Keller Software
Escape from Doomworld	1986	Red Rat Software
Escape from Perilous	1983	English Software Company
Escape from Volantium	1982	Dynacomp
Escape from Vulcan's Isle	1982	Epyx
Escaper (The)	1989	B.Ware
Espial	1984	Tigervision
Essex	1985	Synapse Software
Euchre	1983	Dynacomp
Eureka!	1992	Mirage Software
European Scene Jigsaw Puzzles - Volume 1	1981	Thorn EMI (UK)
European Scene Jigsaw Puzzles - Volume 2	1981	Thorn EMI (UK)
European Super Soccer		Tynesoft
Evader	1986	Pro*Mega Software
Everest Explorer	1982	Acorn Software
Evolution	1984	Sydney Development Corp.
Excalibur	1983	APX
Excelsor	1986	Players
Exit Watch	1983	K-Tek Software
Exocet Blast Off	1983	ALA Software
Exploding Wall	1989	Byte Back
Exploring Adventures on the Atari 48K	1984	Duckworth
Extirpator! (The)	1988	Firebird (UK)
F-15 Strike Eagle	1984	MicroProse Software
Fall of Rome (The)	1984	ASP Software
Family Fun - Four Letter Word	1983	Soflow Software
Fantastic Games #1	1991	User-Mag
Fantastic Soccer	1989	Zeppelin Games
Fantastic Voyage (1982 video game)	1982	Sirius Software
Fantasyland 2041 AD	1981	Crystalware
Fast Eddie	1982	Sirius Software
Fastgammon	1980	Quality Software
Fatum	1993	ASF
FEAR - Figure Eight Auto Racing	1985	RASCOM
Festival		Aim Software
Feud	1987	Bulldog Software
Fidget	1986	Americana
Field of Fire	1984	Strategic Simulations, Inc.
Fight Night	1985	Accolade
Fighter Pilot (Digital Integration)	1985	Digital Integration
Fighter Pilot (Interceptor Software)	1983	Interceptor Software
Fiji	1988	R+E Software
Final Exam	1982	Silicon Valley Systems
Final Flight!	1983	MMG Micro Software
Final Legacy	1984	Atari
Final Orbit	1983	Sirius Software
Fire and Flood	1983	K-Tek Software
Fire Power	1993	ASF
Fire Stone	1995	Sikor Soft
Firebird	1981	Gebelli Software
Firefleet	1983	English Software Company
Fische Fischen		Europa Computer-Club
FischMarkt	1985	Europa Computer-Club
Five Card Draw Poker	1982	Avalon Hill
Flagship Command	1983	ALA Software
Flak	1984	Funsoft, Inc.
Flapper	1983	Romox
Fleet	1980	Programma International
Flight Simulator (Dynacomp)	1980	Dynacomp
Flight Simulator II	1984	SubLOGIC
Flip and Flop	1983	First Star Software
Floyd of the Jungle	1982	MicroProse Software
Flying Ace	1982	Avalon Hill
Flying Tigers	1982	Discovery Games
Fog	1983	K-Tek Software
Fooblitzky	1985	Infocom
Food Fight	1987	Atari
Football Manager	1985	Addictive Games
Footballer of the Year	1986	Gremlin Graphics
Forbidden Forest	1983	Cosmi
Foreign Legion	1983	K-Tek Software
Forest Fire!	1981	Artworx
Forest Fire! Two	1982	Artworx
Forgotten Island	1981	Crystalware
Formula 1 Racing	1982	Acorn Software
Fort Apocalypse	1983	Synapse Software
Fortress (1983 video game)	1983	Strategic Simulations, Inc.
Fortress Underground	1987	Kingsoft
Fortune Hunter	1982	Romox
Four-in-One Sampler	1984	Infocom
Frame Up	1979	Sears
Frank and Mark	1993	LK Avalon
Frantic!	1986	Computronic
Frazzle	1981	Computer Consultants of Iowa
Freaky Factory	1986	Red Rat Software
Fred (KE-Soft)	1991	KE-Soft
Fred (Zeppelin Games)	1991	Zeppelin Games
FREE - Funny Risky Evil Escape	1985	Epsilon Software
Free Trader	1983	Avalon Hill
Frenesis	1987	Mastertronic (UK)
Frogger (Parker Brothers)	1983	Parker Brothers
Frogger (Sierra On-Line)	1982	Sierra On-Line
Frogger II: ThreeeDeep!	1984	Parker Brothers
Frontier Galaxy	1983	ALA Software
Fruit Machine Simulator	1989	Code Masters
Fruit Pickin'	1985	PF Software
Fruit Salad	1985	PF Software
FunPak 4	1983	Pyramid Software, Inc.
Fury - The Wrath of Taljun Cathu	1991	Aerion Software
Fuzzy	1985	Shoesoft
G-Men	1983	ALA Software
Gabi/Kvadryk	1990	Spektra
Galactic Adventures	1982	Strategic Simulations, Inc.
Galactic Avenger	1982	Cosmi
Galactic Chase	1981	Spectrum Computers
Galactic Cresta	1987	STV Software
Galactic Empire (1980 video game)	1981	Adventure International
Galactic Explorer	1982	Software Brandl und Rinne
Galactic Patrol	1983	ALA Software
Galactic Quest	1981	Crystalware
Galactic Trader	1981	Adventure International
Galahad and the Holy Grail	1982	APX
Galaxian	1982	Atari
Galaxy	1982	Avalon Hill
Gallahad	1992	Domain Software
Gallery of Death	1983	ASP Software
Game of Jericho (The)	1983	Davka Corporation
Game Show	1982	APX
Games	1987	Quality
Games 20	1984	Cymbal Software
Games Disk	1989	Alhart Enterprises
Games Pack I	1981	Dynacomp
Games Pack II	1981	Dynacomp
Gamma Ray	1984	Aim Software
Gangstersville	1987	Lindasoft
Gates of the Incas	1983	Umbrella Software, Inc.
Gateway to Apshai	1983	Epyx
Gato	1987	Atari
Gauntlet	1985	US Gold
Gefahrenzone	1984	QuelleSoft
Geheimnisvolle Insel (Die)	1987	Chip / Vogel-Verlag KG
Geisterschloss	1992	KE-Soft
Gemstone Warrior	1985	Strategic Simulations, Inc.
Genesis	1983	Datasoft
Genetic Drift	1982	Brøderbund Software
Germ Warfare		Aim Software
Getaway!	1982	APX
Gettysburg: The Turning Point	1986	Strategic Simulations, Inc.
GFS Sorceress	1981	Avalon Hill
Ghost Chaser	1984	Artworx
Ghost Encounters	1982	JV Software
Ghost Hunter	1981	Arcade Plus
Ghostbusters (1984 video game)	1984	Activision
Giant Slalom	1981	Artworx
Giga Trek	1982	Artworx
Gigablast	1991	MHS
Gin Rummy 3.0	1981	Manhattan Software
Gladiator	1983	K-Tek Software
Gladiator (The)	1985	Richwood Software
Global War	1993	LK Avalon
Gnome Ranger	1987	Level 9 Computing
Go (Hayden Software)	1982	Hayden Software
Go (Stack Computer Services)	1983	Stack Computer Services
Go Fish	1982	Dynacomp
Going to the Dogs!	1982	APX
Gold Hunter	1992	LK Avalon
Gold Mine	1983	Spectravideo
Golden Gloves	1982	Artworx
Golden Oldies: Volume 1 - Computer Software Classics	1987	Software Toolworks (The)
Golden Void	1983	Aim Software
GoldGräber	1985	Europa Computer-Club
Golf am Sonntag	1984	QuelleSoft
Golf Challenge	1982	Sierra On-Line
Golf Master	1983	Joyland Software
Golf Pro	1982	Dynacomp
Gomoko II	1982	Dynacomp
Gomoku	1980	ArtSci
Gorf	1982	Roklan
Gorgon	1983	K-Tek Software
Gower Gulch	1983	K-Tek Software
Grand Prix Simulator		Code Masters
Great Adventure (The)	1989	PM Software
Great War - 1914 (The)	1986	DKG
Green Beret	1986	Imagine
Green Goblins	1982	Unicorn Software
Gridiron Glory	1982	APX
Gridrunner	1983	Llamasoft
Growing Pains of Adrian Mole (The)	1987	Virgin Games
Gruds in Space	1983	Sirius Software
Guard	1992	Sonix Software
Guardians of the Gorn	1982	Inhome Software
Guderian	1986	Avalon Hill
Guess the Number	1982	Don't Ask Computer Software
Guess What's Coming to Dinner?	1982	Educational Software, Inc.
Guessword	1980	THESIS
Gulf Strike	1984	Avalon Hill
Gumball	1983	Brøderbund Software
Gun Boat	1983	ALA Software
Gun Law	1986	Mastertronic (UK)
Gunfight (Hofacker / Elcomp Publishing)	1982	Hofacker / Elcomp Publishing
Gunfight (Micro Mike's)	1980	Micro Mike's
Gunfighter	1989	Atlantis Software
Guns of Fort Defiance	1981	Avalon Hill
Gunslinger	1987	Datasoft
Gwendolyn	1983	Artworx
Gypsy	1982	Avalon Hill
Gyruss	1984	Parker Brothers
H.E.R.O.	1984	Activision
Hacker	1985	Activision
Hacker's Night (A)	1990	AMC-Verlag
Hail to the Chief	1980	Creative Computing Software
Hammer Head	1983	K-Tek Software
Hammerhead		Aim Software
Handicapper II	1985	Dynacomp
Hangman (Antic Software)	1986	Antic Software
Hangman (Atari)	1980	Atari
Hans Kloss	1992	LK Avalon
Hard Hat Mack	1983	Electronic Arts
HardBall!	1985	Accolade
Hareraiser - Finale	1984	Haresoft Ltd.
Hareraiser - Prelude	1984	Haresoft Ltd.
Haunted Hill	1982	Swifty Software
Haunted House	1980	Creative Computing Software
Haunted Palace (The)	1982	Crystalware
Hawk Fire	1983	K-Tek Software
Hawkmoon	1993	LK Avalon
Hawkquest	1989	Red Rat Software
Hazard Run	1983	Artworx
Head over Heels		Hit Squad (The)
Heartache	1988	Atari UK
Heist!	1983	Aim Software
Helix	1993	Mirage Software
Hellcat Ace	1982	MicroProse Software
Henri	1984	Visions Software Factory
Henry's House	1987	Mastertronic (UK)
Her Majesty's Secret Weapon	1983	Distro Enterprises, Inc.
Herbert	1988	AMC-Verlag
Herbert II	1989	AMC-Verlag
Hexan	1987	KAW
Hi-Res Adventure #0 - Mission: Asteroid	1982	Sierra On-Line
Hi-Res Adventure #2 - Wizard and the Princess	1982	Sierra On-Line
Hi-Res Adventure #4 - Ulysses and the Golden Fleece	1982	Sierra On-Line
Hi-Res Adventure #6 - The Dark Crystal	1984	Sierra On-Line
Hickory Dickory Dock / Baa, Baa, Black Sheep	1981	Thorn EMI (UK)
High Water Rapids	1983	ALA Software
Highrise	1983	MicroLab, Inc.
Highway	1982	ALA Software
Highway Duel	1984	Dynamics Marketing GmbH
Hijack!	1985	English Software Company
Hockey (1981 video game)	1981	Gamma Software
Hollywood Hijinx	1986	Infocom
Holster		Aim Software
Hopper	1988	Artacyis Software
Horror Park / Hamurabi	1982	Münzenloher GmbH
Hot Lips	1982	London Software
Hotel	1985	Ariolasoft (Germany)
Hotel Alien	1985	Artworx
Hotfoot	1982	Amazon Systems
House of Usher (Crystalware)	1980	Crystalware
House of Usher (Kingsoft)	1985	Kingsoft
Hover Bovver	1984	Llamasoft
Humanoid	1992	Sonix Software
Humpty Dumpty / Jack and Jill	1981	Thorn EMI (UK)
Hydra		K-Tek Software
Hydraulik	1993	ASF
Hydraulik / Snowball	1993	LK Avalon
Hyperblast!	1983	English Software Company
Hypnotic Land	1992	Lindasoft
I Spy for Kids	1983	Channel 8 Software
Im Namen des Königs	1988	R+E Software
Imagic 1-2-3	1984	Imagic
Imagine	1992	LK Avalon
Impact	1983	APX
Imperial Walker Battle	1980	Micro Mike's
Imperium Galactum	1984	Strategic Simulations, Inc.
Impossible Mission	1982	ALA Software
In Search of the Most Amazing Thing	1983	Spinnaker Software
Incydent	1993	ASF
Infantry Squad	1987	Rassilon Software
Infidel	1983	Infocom
Infiltrator	1986	Mindscape
Infraction Beam	1983	K-Tek Software
Ingrid's Back	1988	Level 9 Computing
Inny Swiat	1994	Mirage Software
Inside	1990	Spektra
Inspektor	1993	Orkus Software
Institute, The (Graphics)	1981	Med Systems Software
Institute, The (Text)	1983	Screenplay
Inter Galleon Battle	1984	K-Tek Software
Interstar	1984	Cibercomp
Into the Eagle's Nest	1988	Atari
Intruder Alert!	1981	Dynacomp
Intruder!	1982	Inhome Software
Invasion	1987	Bulldog Software
Invasion Orion	1981	Epyx
Ion Roadway	1983	APX
IQ	1987	CRL
IQ Baseball	1983	Davka Corporation
IQ Baseball - World Series	1983	Davka Corporation
IQ Master	1992	ASF
Istar Crossword	1985	Istar Corporation
Ithix	1983	Romox (Canada)
Jaffar	1993	Mirage Software
Jagdstaffel	1980	Discovery Games
James Bond 007 (1984 video game)	1984	Parker Brothers
Janosik	1994	Mirage Software
Jaskiniowiec	1995	StanBit
Java Jim	1985	Sparklers
Jawbreaker	1981	Sierra On-Line
Jawbreaker II	1982	Sierra On-Line
Jax-O	1982	APX
Jeepers Creepers	1982	Quality Software
Jenny of the Prairie	1984	Rhiannon Software
Jet Action (The)	1992	LK Avalon
Jet Set Willy	1986	Tynesoft
Jet-Boot Jack	1983	English Software Company
Jeu de Loto	1984	Nathan
Jeu du Royaume		Atari France
Jewels of Darkness	1986	Rainbird
Jinks	1991	AMC-Verlag
Jinxter	1987	Rainbird
Jocky Wilson's Compendium of Darts	1991	Zeppelin Games
Jocky Wilson's Darts Challenge	1988	Zeppelin Games
Joe and the Nuclear Caverns	1987	STV Software
Joe Blade	1988	Players
Joe Blade 2	1989	Players
Johnny the Ghost	1994	ANG Software
Journey to the Planets	1982	JV Software
Joust	1983	Atari
Juegos Didácticos - Medios de Transporte	1992	Prisma Soft
Juegos Didácticos - Útiles Escolares	1992	Prisma Soft
Juggler	1982	IDSI
Juice!	1983	Tronix Software
Jumbo Jet Pilot	1982	Thorn EMI (UK)
Jump Jet	1985	Anirog Software
Jumper	1985	Europa Computer-Club
Jumping Jack	1993	ASF
Jumpman	1983	Epyx
Jumpman Junior	1983	Epyx
Jungle Boy	1983	Irata Verlag
Jungle Hunt	1983	Atari
Juno First	1983	Datasoft
Jupiter Mission 1999	1983	Avalon Hill
Jurassic Park II	1997	Sikor Soft
K-Razy Antiks	1982	CBS Software
K-Razy Kritters	1982	CBS Software
K-Razy Shoot-Out	1982	CBS Software
K-Star Patrol	1982	CBS Software
Kaboom!	1983	Activision
Kaiser	1984	Ariolasoft (Germany)
Kamikaze	1981	Star Gazer
Kampania Wrzesniowa	1993	LK Avalon
Kampf dem Ungeziefer	1984	QuelleSoft
Kampfgruppe	1985	Strategic Simulations, Inc.
Kangaroo	1982	APX
Kannibalen	1984	QuelleSoft
Karateka	1985	Brøderbund Software
Karmic Caverns	1983	PMI
Karriere	1984	Atari Elektronik
Kasiarz	1994	Krysal
Kayos	1981	Computer Magic Ltd.
Ken Uston's Professional Blackjack	1983	Screenplay
Kennedy Approach	1985	MicroProse Software
Kenny Dalglish Soccer Manager	1989	Cognito
Keno	1980	CE Software
Kernaw	1993	LK Avalon
Ketchup	1996	Sikor Soft
Keystone Kapers	1983	Activision
Kick Off	1989	Anco Software
Kickback	1982	Thorn EMI (UK)
Kid Grid	1982	Tronix Software
Kid's Programs #1	1982	Educational Software, Inc.
Kid's Programs #2	1981	Santa Cruz Educational Software
Kikstart: Off-Road Simulator	1986	Mastertronic (UK)
King Arthur's Heir	1982	Epyx
King Cribbage	1983	Hayden Software
King of the Castle	1983	ALA Software
King of the Ring	1985	Gremlin Graphics
King Tut's Tomb	1985	Antic Software
Kingdom	1980	Atari
Kissin' Kousins	1985	English Software Company
Klatwa	1992	LK Avalon
Klondike Solitaire	1985	Antic Software
Knicker-Bockers	1988	TDC Distributors
Knight Orc	1987	Rainbird
Knights and Wizards	1984	K-Tek Software
Knights of the Desert	1983	Strategic Simulations, Inc.
Knights of the Round Table	1983	ALA Software
Knock!	1992	Domain Software
Knockout (Anco Software)	1986	Anco Software
Knossos	1981	Med Systems Software
Kolko i Krzyzyk	1987	KAW
Kolony	1990	Mirage Software
Koninkrijk	1983	Atari Benelux
Koronis Rift	1985	Epyx
Krazy Kopter	1983	English Software Company
Krucjata	1993	ASF
Ksiaze	1994	Mirage Software
Kult	1992	ASF
Kupiec	1993	ASF
Labirinto	1987	Lindasoft
Labyrinth (1982 video game)	1982	Brøderbund Software
Labyrinth of Crete (The)	1983	Adventure International
Labyrinth Run	1981	Manhattan Software
Labyrinths	1982	PCA
Lancelot	1988	Level 9 Computing
Lander	1980	Programma International
Lantern	1982	Aim Software
Lapis Philosophorum - Der Stein der Weisen	1985	Ariolasoft (Germany)
Las Vegas Casino	1988	Zeppelin Games
Laser Cycle	1984	SGM Software
Laser Hawk	1986	Red Rat Software
Laser Racers	1983	Silicon Valley Systems
Laser Strike	1981	STEDEK Software
Laser Tennis	1983	Allsoft & GDT
Laser Wars	1981	Crystalware
Lasermania / Robbo Konstruktor	1990	LK Avalon
LaserMaze	1992	KE-Soft
Last Guardian (The)	1988	Tynesoft
Last of the Dragons	1983	ALA Software
Lava Run	1983	K-Tek Software
Lazer Feds	1986	White Bag Software
Lazer Maze	1982	Avant-Garde Creations
Leader Board	1986	Access Software
Leader Board Tournament	1986	Access Software
League Challenge	1988	Atlantis Software
Leap Frog!	1983	Rantom Software
Leaper	1986	Bug-Byte
Leapster	1988	Alternative Software
Learning with Leeper	1983	Sierra On-Line
Leather Goddesses of Phobos	1986	Infocom
Leggit!	1983	Imagine
Legionnaire	1982	Avalon Hill
Leise Tod (Der)	1987	R+E Software
LEM - The Moon Lander Game	1984	Optimized Systems Software, Inc.
Lemonade	1981	APX
Lepus Revenge	1983	ALA Software
Letterman	1981	APX
Lifespan	1985	Antic Software
Liga Polska	1995	Sikor Soft
Lighthouse	1983	ALA Software
Limonade	1981	Atari France
Little Crystal	1981	Crystalware
Little Devil		Red Rat Software
Liverpool		Corbishley, P. M.
Lizard	1992	Tiger Developments
Location	1984	Homecomputer
Loco	1986	Alligata Software
Loco-Motion	1982	Software Street
Lode Runner	1983	Brøderbund Software
Lode Runner's Rescue	1985	Synapse Software
Log Roll	1983	ALA Software
Logic Levels	1984	Fisher-Price
Lone Raider (The)	1983	Atari UK
Lookahead	1981	APX
Lord of the Orb	1985	Antic Software
Lords of Conquest	1986	Electronic Arts
Lords of Karma	1981	Avalon Hill
Lords of Time	1984	Level 9 Computing
Lorien's Tomb	1992	LK Avalon
Los Angeles SWAT	1986	Mastertronic (UK)
Lost Colony	1981	Acorn Software
Lost in the Labyrinth	1983	Stack Computer Services
Lost Tomb	1984	Datasoft
Lowca	1993	Krysal
Lucifer's Realm	1981	Med Systems Software
Lucifer's Realm (Enhanced)	1984	American Eagle Software
Lunar Lander (Adventure International)	1981	Adventure International
Lunar Leeper	1983	Sierra On-Line
M*A*S*H	1983	Romox
M.U.L.E.	1983	Electronic Arts
Mad Genius	1983	K-Tek Software
Mad Jax	1989	Byte Back
Mad Marble	1980	CE Software
Mad Stone	1993	Blue Flame
Mad-Netter	1982	Computer Magic Ltd.
Magia	1993	Mirage Software
Magia Fortuny	1993	ASF
Magia Krysztalu	1992	ASF
Magic Dimension	1993	ASF
Magic Escape / Test Drive	1988	Lindasoft
Magic of Words	1996	Sikor Soft
Magneto		Aim Software
Magneto Bugs	1983	Gentry Software
Magnex	1994	ESC
Mah Jong	1993	ChildsPlay SoftWare Services
Mail Order Monsters	1985	Electronic Arts
Major Bronx	1992	LK Avalon
Major League Hockey	1983	Thorn EMI (UK)
Management Simulator		Dynacomp
Maniac Miner	1983	Gentry Software
Mankala	1982	APX
Mar Tesoro	1981	Syncro, Inc.
Marauder	1982	Sierra On-Line
Mario Bros.	1988	Atari
Market Blitz		TK Computer Products
Market Forces	1984	Avalon Hill
Market Place (The)	1982	APX
Mars	1986	Ariolasoft (Germany)
Mars Mission II	1981	Antic Software
Martian Castle	1983	ALA Software
Martian Placement	1983	ALA Software
Master Chess	1985	Mastertronic (USA)
Master Head	1992	Sonix Software
Master of the Lamps	1985	Activision
MasterMatch	1983	APX
Masters of Time	1985	Cosmi
Masters' Golf	1981	Ramware
Match Racer	1981	Gebelli Software
Match-Wits	1983	CBS Software
Matchboxes	1983	Brøderbund Software
Matta Blatta	1988	Firebird (UK)
Matterhorn	1984	Tigervision
Max	1997	Sikor Soft
Maxi Golf	1984	Adventure International
Maxwell Manor - The Skull of Doom	1984	Avalon Hill
Maxwell's Demon / Memory Mania	1983	Gentry Software
Maze of Death	1981	Syncro, Inc.
Mech Brigade	1985	Strategic Simulations, Inc.
Mediator	1985	English Software Company
Megalegs	1982	Megasoft, Inc.
Megamania	1983	Activision
Melt-Down	1982	APX
Meltdown	1983	Cosmi
Memory Builder - Concentration	1980	PDI
Memory Manor	1984	Fisher-Price
Memory Match	1981	APX
Mensa Master	1982	Dynacomp
Mensch Ärgere Dich Nicht	1982	Münzenloher GmbH
Mercenary: Escape from Trag	1985	Novagen Software (UK)
Mercenary:The Second City	1986	Novagen Software (UK)
Meteor Storm	1982	Royal Software
Microchess	1981	Personal Software
MicroLeague Baseball	1984	Micro League Sports Association
MicroMan	1993	ASF
MicroSailing	1982	APX
Microworld		Med Systems Software
Microx	1993	LK Avalon
Midas Touch (The)	1981	APX
Midnight	1992	Mirage Software
Midway	1981	Dynacomp
Midway Battles	1987	TDC Distributors
Midway Campaign	1980	Avalon Hill
Miecze Valdgira	1991	ASF
Miecze Valdgira II - Wladca Gor	1993	ASF
MiG Alley Ace	1983	MicroProse Software
Mike's Slot Machine II	1985	AMC-Verlag
Milk Race	1987	Mastertronic (UK)
Millionaire: The Stock Market Simulation	1982	Blue Chip Software
Millipede	1984	Atari
Millipedes	1982	Software Street
Mind Bogglers I	1980	Versa Computing
Mind Master	1980	Image Computer Products
Mindshadow	1985	Activision
Mindwheel	1984	Synapse Software
Miner 2049er	1982	Big Five Software
Mines!	1993	ANG Software
Mini-Crossword	1980	PDI
Miniature Golf Plus (XLEnt Software)	1985	XLEnt Software
Minotaur	1981	APX
Mirax Force	1987	Tynesoft
Misja / Fred	1991	LK Avalon
Missile Command	1981	Atari
Missing... One Droid	1986	Bug-Byte
Mission	1991	Zeppelin Games
Mission on Thunderhead	1985	Avalon Hill
Mission Shark	1991	Zeppelin Games
Mix and Match	1983	K-Tek Software
Mixtrood	1994	ESC
Mode Mixer / Battle Stations	1983	XLEnt Software
Mogul Maniac	1983	Romox
Molecule Man	1985	Mastertronic (USA)
Monarch	1981	Dynacomp
Monday Morning Manager	1985	TK Computer Products
Money $pin	1986	White Bag Software
Mongoose	1983	Aim Software
Monkey Magic	1987	Micro Design
Monster Hunt	1988	MHS
Monster Maze	1982	Epyx
Monster Smash	1983	Datamost, Inc.
Monstrum	1992	ASF
Montezuma's Revenge	1984	Parker Brothers
Moogles	1983	Sirius Software
Moon Marauder	1983	APX
Moon Patrol (Atari)	1983	Atari
Moon Patrol (Avalon Hill)	1982	Avalon Hill
Moon Probe	1981	Dynacomp
Moon Shuttle	1983	Datasoft
Moonbase Io	1982	PDI
Moonbase Plato	1985	UKACOC
Moonmist	1986	Infocom
Mord an Bord	1985	Ariolasoft (Germany)
Mordon's Quest	1985	Melbourne House
Moscow 1993	1994	Sikor Soft
Motocross	1982	BANK, Inc.
Mountain Bike Racer	1989	Zeppelin Games
Mountain King	1983	CBS Software
Mountain Shoot	1981	Adventure International
Mouse Trap (1986 video game) (Mouse Quest)	1987	TDC Distributors
Mouskattack	1981	Sierra On-Line
Moving Maze	1981	Dynacomp
Mr. Cool	1983	Sierra On-Line
Mr. Dig	1984	Microdeal
Mr. Do!	1984	Datasoft
Mr. Do's Castle	1984	Parker Brothers Canada
Mr. Robot and His Robot Factory	1983	Datamost, Inc.
Mr. TNT	1983	HesWare
MRCA Mach 2 Combat Flight Simulator	1986	Firebird (USA)
Ms. Pac-Man	1983	Atari
Muff / Drutt	1992	ASF
Mugwump	1981	APX
Murder at Awesome Hall	1982	Channel 8 Software
Murder on the Zinderneuf	1983	Electronic Arts
Murder-Murder-Murder	1981	CEL Programs
Musical Pilot	1983	APX
Mutant Bats	1986	Red Rat Software
Mychess II	1984	Datamost, Inc.
Myriapod	1982	ATACOMP
Mysterious Adventure No. 1 - The Golden Baton	1982	Channel 8 Software
Mysterious Adventure No. 2 - The Time Machine	1983	Channel 8 Software
Mysterious Adventure No. 3 - Arrow of Death - Part 1	1983	Channel 8 Software
Mysterious Adventure No. 5 - Escape from Pulsar 7	1983	Channel 8 Software
Mysterious Adventure No. 6 - Circus	1983	Channel 8 Software
Mysterious Adventure No. 7 - Feasibility Experiment	1982	Channel 8 Software
Mysterious Adventure No. 8 - The Wizard of Akyrz	1983	Channel 8 Software
Mysterious Adventure No. 9 - Perseus and Andromeda	1983	Channel 8 Software
Mysterious Adventure No. 10 - Ten Little Indians	1983	Channel 8 Software
Mysterious Adventure No. 11 - Waxworks	1984	Channel 8 Software
Mythos I	1985	Ariolasoft (Germany)
Mózgprocesor	1991	Mirage Software
Nadral		Atari Elektronik
Najemnik	1992	Krysal
Najemnik - Powrot	1993	Krysal
Nam (1986 video game)	1985	Strategic Simulations, Inc.
Name That Song	1981	Quality Software
Napoleon at Waterloo	1985	KRENtek Software
Napoleon in Russia: Borodino 1812	1988	Datasoft
NATO Commander	1983	MicroProse Software
Nautilus	1982	Synapse Software
Nazz	1983	Silicon Valley Systems
Nebs	1983	Dynacomp
Necromancer	1982	Synapse Software
Nelson Football League (The)	1986	DSD Video
Neptune's Daughters	1984	English Software Company
Neron	1993	LK Avalon
Nest		Aim Software
Neuroid	1996	Sikor Soft
Neverending Story (The)	1986	Datasoft
New Crown / Domino	1984	UserSoft
New York City	1984	Synapse Software
NFL Handicapper	1985	Dynacomp
Nibbler	1983	Datasoft
Nibelungen	1985	Ariolasoft (Germany)
Night Mission Pinball	1982	SubLOGIC
Nightmare (The)	1982	Epyx
Nightmare Maze	1986	Blue Ribbon Software
Nightmares	1987	Red Rat Software
Nightraiders	1983	Datamost, Inc.
Nightstrike	1983	TG Software
Nim II / Tixo	1987	KAW
Nineball	1982	ZiMAG
Ninja (1986 video game)	1986	Mastertronic (UK)
Ninja Commando	1989	Zeppelin Games
Ninja Master	1986	Firebird (UK)
Nominoes Jigsaw	1981	Artworx
North Atlantic Convoy Raider	1981	Avalon Hill
Nuclear Adventure or the North Base	1990	JRC
Nuclear Nick	1986	Americana
Nucleus	1988	Atari UK
Nuke Sub / Galaxy Defender	1981	Amulet Enterprises
NukeWar	1980	Avalon Hill
Number Battle	1981	Computer Consultants of Iowa
Numtris	1992	Eiko-Soft
O'Riley's Mine	1983	Datasoft
Objective: Kursk (SSI)	1984	Strategic Simulations, Inc.
Oblitroid	1989	KE-Soft
OCI	1988	Tearsoft
Odin	1982	Odesta
Ogre	1986	Origin Systems
Oil Wells	1979	Sears
Oil's Well	1983	Sierra On-Line
Old-Surehand	1984	CPU / Roeske Verlag
Olin in Emerald	1984	Adventure International
Ollie's Follies	1986	Americana
Olympic Skier	1986	Americana
Omar	1985	Antic Software
On Cue	1987	Mastertronic (UK)
On-Track Computer Model Car Racing	1985	Gamestar
One Man and His Droid	1986	Mastertronic (UK)
One on One: Dr. J vs. Larry Bird	1983	Electronic Arts
Opera House / Qa!	1986	SECS
Operation Blood	1992	Mirage Software
Operation Crossroads		Shoesoft
Operation Market Garden	1985	Strategic Simulations, Inc.
Operation Whirlwind	1983	Brøderbund Software
Operazione Tuono		Lindasoft
Orb of Zarramier (The)	1986	Futureware
Orbit - A Trip to the Moon	1985	Antic Software
Orc Attack	1983	Creative Sparks
Orto Puzzle	1996	Sikor Soft
Othello	1983	Stack Computer Services
Other-Venture #2 - The Curse of Crowley Manor	1981	Adventure International
Other-Venture #3 - Escape from Traam	1981	Adventure International
Other-Venture #4 - Earthquake - San Francisco 1906	1981	Adventure International
Outdoor Games	1980	Creative Computing Software
Outlaw / Howitzer	1979	APX
Outris	1992	Domain Software
Owari / Bull and Cow	1982	Thorn EMI (UK)
Ozzy's Orchard	1983	TG Software
Pac-Man	1982	Atari
Pacific Coast Highway	1982	Datasoft
Pakman's Brother's Revenge		Shoesoft
Pang	1993	ASF
Panic	1983	ALA Software
Panic Express	1986	Red Rat Software
Panik!	1987	Atlantis Software
Panther (1986 video game)	1987	Mastertronic (UK)
Panzer	1984	Sentinel Software
Panzer Grenadier	1985	Strategic Simulations, Inc.
Panzer War	1983	Windcrest Software
Panzer-Jagd	1983	Avalon Hill
Paper Boy	1983	Dynacomp
Papiro della Pace (Il)	1987	Lindasoft
Paradise Threat (The)	1982	Med Systems Software
Parallax	1983	London Software
Paris in Danger	1983	Avalon Hill
Parking Lot	1983	Aim Software
Parsec XL	1991	Secret Games
Pastfinder	1984	Activision
Pathfinder	1982	Gebelli Software
Patience	1982	Btari
Patrol "Xal" Alpha	1985	Shoesoft
Paul Daniels' Magic Adventure	1983	Amazon Systems
Pay-Off (The)	1984	Atari UK
Peggammon	1986	Artworx
Pengo	1983	Atari
Pengon	1984	Microdeal
Pensate	1983	Penguin Software
Perilous Journey		Aim Software
Periscope Up!	1988	Atlantis Software
Personal Fitness Program	1981	APX
Phantasie	1987	Strategic Simulations, Inc.
Phantasie II	1987	Strategic Simulations, Inc.
Phantom	1987	Tynesoft
Pharaoh's Pyramid	1983	Master Control Software
Phobos (APX)	1982	APX
Phoenix Lair	1983	MMG Micro Software
Picnic Paranoia	1982	Synapse Software
Pico-Adventure	1984	Optimized Systems Software, Inc.
Picture Puzzle	1984	PF Software
Picture Torment	1984	PF Software
Pie-Man	1983	Penguin Software
Piekielko	1992	LK Avalon
Pilot	1982	Artworx
Pinguin	1984	QuelleSoft
Pinhead	1982	Utopia Software
Pioneer Experience (The)	1981	Crystalware
Piranha	1983	ALA Software
Pirate Pond	1983	ALA Software
Pirates of the Barbary Coast	1986	StarSoft Development Laboratories
Pitfall II: Lost Caverns	1984	Activision
Pitfall!	1984	Activision
Pitstop	1983	Epyx
Pitstop II	1984	Epyx
Planet Attack	1989	Byte Back
Planet Miners	1981	Avalon Hill
Planet Patrol		Aim Software
Planetfall (ASP Software)	1983	ASP Software
Planetfall (Infocom)	1983	Infocom
Plantation	1984	Ad Astra
Plaqueman	1983	HomeComputer Software, Inc.
Plasma		Aim Software
Plastron	1990	Harlequin Software
PlatterMania	1982	Epyx
Plundered Hearts	1987	Infocom
Pogo Joe	1983	Screenplay
Pogoman	1982	Computer Magic Ltd.
Pogotron	1989	Artronic Products Ltd.
Poker Party	1980	Dynacomp
Poker Solitaire	1981	ArtSci
Poker Tourney	1982	Artworx
PokerSAM	1983	Don't Ask Computer Software
Polar Pierre	1984	Datamost, Inc.
Pole Position	1983	Atari
Pondering about Max's	1989	Change in Heat
Pong (Mirage Software)	1992	Mirage Software
Pool	1981	Creative Computing Software
Pool 1.5 (Pool 400)	1981	IDSI
Pooyan	1983	Datasoft
Pop-n-Rocker	1987	Alpha Systems
Popeye	1983	Parker Brothers
Porky's	1983	Romox
Pornopoly	1980	Computer Consultants of Iowa
Pothole Pete	1988	Atlantis Software
Poussinet	1985	CRN Electronics
POW	1987	Microdaft
Power Down	1987	Mastertronic (UK)
Powerpath	1982	Raymon Aldridge Design
Powerstar	1985	Pandora Software
PQ - The Party Quiz Game	1984	Suncom
PQ - The Party Quiz Game - Bible Edition 1	1984	Suncom
PQ - The Party Quiz Game - Sports Edition 1	1984	Suncom
Preppie!	1982	Adventure International
Preppie! II	1983	Adventure International
Princess and Frog	1982	Romox
Prism	1982	ISM
Prisoner 2	1982	Edu-Ware
Pro Bowling (APX)	1981	APX
Pro Golf	1988	Atlantis Software
Pro Mountain Bike Simulator	1989	Alternative Software
Probe One: The Transmitter	1982	Synergistic Software
Problem Jasia (Johnny's Trouble)	1992	Mirage Software / ANG Software
Professional Killers II	1992	SK Wizards
Promoteur	1985	Atari France
Protector (Mastertronic (UK))	1989	Mastertronic (UK)
Protector (Synapse Software)	1981	Synapse Software
Protector II	1982	Synapse Software
Proto's Favorite Games	1983	Educational Software, Inc.
Przemytnik	1992	ASF
Psycho Shoot	1983	ALA Software
Pushky	1982	APX
Pushover	1982	APX
Puzzle Construction Set	1984	SGM Software
Puzzle Panic	1984	Epyx
Puzzler	1983	APX
Pyramid (Mirage Software)	1993	Mirage Software
Pyramid Run	1984	MMG Micro Software
Pyramidos	1985	AMC-Verlag
Q*bert	1983	Parker Brothers
Qix	1982	Atari
QS Reversi	1982	Quality Software
Quarxon	1982	APX
Quasimodo	1983	Synapse Software
Queen of Hearts	1983	Strategic Simulations, Inc.
Quest (The) (Penguin Software)	1984	Penguin Software
Quest for Eternity	1984	Argus Press Software Group
Quest for Quintana Roo	1984	Sunrise Software
Quest for the Maltese Chicken (The)	1986	Futureware
Quest of the Space Beagle	1984	Avalon Hill
Quest XL/XE	1989	Bertl-Soft
Questions et Réponses		Atari France
Questprobe #1 - The Hulk	1984	Adventure International
Questprobe #2 - Spider-Man	1984	Adventure International
Questprobe #3 - Fantastic Four	1985	Adventure International
Questprobe featuring Human Torch and the Thing	1985	Adventure International
Questron	1984	Strategic Simulations, Inc.
Quintominoes	1982	Dynacomp
Quiwi	1986	Kingsoft
Quiz Master	1982	APX
Rabbotz!	1982	APX
Race in Space	1981	ANALOG Software
Racing Destruction Set	1985	Electronic Arts
Rack'em Up!	1983	Roklan
Radiation Dump	1983	K-Tek Software
RAF - Battle of Britain	1980	Discovery Games
Raid on Gravitron	1983	APX
Raid over Moscow	1986	Access Software
Raiders of Space	1983	Aim Software
Raidus!	1982	Pyramid Software, Inc.
Rails West!	1984	Strategic Simulations, Inc.
Rainbow Walker	1983	Synapse Software
Rainbow Walker / Countdown	1984	Synapse Software
Rally Speedway	1983	Adventure International
Rampage (1986 video game)	1987	Activision
Rasen-Mäher	1985	Europa Computer-Club
Raster Blaster	1982	BudgeCo
Raszyn 1809	1992	Mirage Software
Rat Race	1983	MMG Micro Software
Rats! Rats! Rats!		Shoesoft
Reactor	1983	Aim Software
Realm of Impossibility (aka Zombies)	1984	Electronic Arts
RealSports Football	1983	Atari
RealSports Tennis	1983	Atari
Rear Guard	1981	Adventure International
Rebel Charge at Chickamauga	1987	Strategic Simulations, Inc.
Rebel Fighter		Milwaukee Software
Rebel Probe	1981	Milwaukee Software
Red Max	1987	Code Masters
Red Moon	1985	Level 9 Computing
Red Zone	1983	K-Tek Software
Reforger '88	1984	Strategic Simulations, Inc.
Relax	1984	Synapse Software
Renaissance	1982	UMI
Replugged	1994	ESC
Repton	1983	Sirius Software
Rescue	1983	ALA Software
Rescue at 94K		Business Data Center
Rescue on Fractalus!	1985	Epyx
Revenge II	1987	Mastertronic (UK)
Revenge of "V"		Shoesoft
Reversal	1983	Hayden Software
Reverse / Missile Action	1993	Mirage Software
Reversi (APX)		APX
Reversi (ArtSci)	1980	ArtSci
Reversi II	1981	APX
Rhymes and Riddles	1982	Spinnaker Software
Richard Petty's Talladega	1984	Cosmi
Rick Hanson	1986	Robico Software
Ricochet (Epyx)	1981	Epyx
Rings of the Empire (The)	1981	Dynacomp
Riot	1992	Domain Software
Ripper	1983	Romox
Ritterkampf / Froschjagd	1982	Münzenloher GmbH
River Raid	1983	Activision
River Rally	1987	Red Rat Software
River Rat	1982	ZiMAG
River Rescue	1983	Thorn EMI (UK)
Roadracer / Bowler	1982	Avalon Hill
Robal / Duch	1992	Mirage Software
Robbo	1989	LK Avalon
Robot Knights	1986	Red Rat Software
Robotron: 2084	1983	Atari
Rocket Raiders	1981	Artworx
Rocket Repairman	1986	Red Rat Software
Rockford	1988	Mastertronic (UK)
Rockman	1995	Mirage Software
Roderic	1991	Mirage Software
Rogue	1988	Mastertronic (UK)
Roman Checkers	1979	Sears
Roman Conquest	1981	Compu-Things
Roman Empire	1983	Lothlorien
Rome and the Barbarians	1984	KRENtek Software
Rommel: Battles for Tobruk	1985	GDW
Rosen's Brigade	1982	Datasoft
Rough Rider	1983	ALA Software
Roulette	1984	Merlin's Software
Roulette Simulator		Byte Back
Round About	1983	Datamost, Inc.
Rucu	1992	LK Avalon
Ruff and Reddy in the Space Adventure	1990	Hi-Tec Software
Rum Runner	1982	Genesis Software
Run for It	1984	Weekly Reader Family Software
Run for the Money (Keypunch Software)	1985	Keypunch Software
Run for the Money (Scarborough Systems)	1984	Scarborough Systems, Inc.
Rush Hour	1983	APX
Rycerz	1993	Mirage Software
SAGA No. 1 - Adventureland (Graphic edition)	1982	Adventure International
SAGA No. 2 - Pirate Adventure	1982	Adventure International
SAGA No. 3 - Mission Impossible	1982	Adventure International
SAGA No. 4 - Voodoo Castle	1983	Adventure International
SAGA No. 5 - The Count	1983	Adventure International
SAGA No. 6 - Strange Odyssey	1982	Adventure International
SAGA No. 13 - The Sorcerer of Claymorgue Castle	1983	Adventure International
Saigon - The Final Days	1982	Adventure International
Salmon Run	1982	APX
Samurai's Game	1992	Krysal
Sands of Mars	1981	Crystalware
Santa Paravia en Fiumaccio		Instant Software
Saper	1991	LK Avalon
Saracen	1987	Datasoft
Saratoga	1983	APX
Sargon II	1982	Hayden Software
Sargon III	1985	Hayden Software
Satalite C	1985	Shoesoft
Satan's Satellite	1980	West Coast Software
Savage Pond	1983	Starcade Software
Scapeghost	1989	Level 9 Computing
Schatz-Suche	1985	Europa Computer-Club
Schatzjäger	1987	Ariolasoft (Germany)
Schooner	1983	ALA Software
Schreckenstein	1985	Ariolasoft (Germany)
Scooter	1985	Americana
Scram	1980	Atari
Screaming Wings	1986	Red Rat Software
Screwball	1985	Blue Ribbon Software
Screwlight	1990	LK Avalon
Sea Bandit	1983	Gentry Software
Sea Chase	1983	Romox
Sea Dragon	1982	Adventure International
Sea Fighter / Lethal Weapon	1989	Secret Games
Sea War	1983	Dynacomp
Seafox	1982	Brøderbund Software
Seastalker	1984	Infocom
Secret Diary of Adrian Mole (The)	1985	Mosaic Publishing
See-Saw Scramble	1983	Romik Software
Seeschlacht	1984	Europa Computer-Club
Sentinel	1982	Med Systems Software
Sentinel One	1982	Inhome Software
Sereamis	1985	Ariolasoft (Germany)
Serpentine	1982	Brøderbund Software
Settore Sigma		Lindasoft
Seven Card Stud	1982	APX
Sex Quix	1995	Mirage Software
Sexversi	1993	Mirage Software
Shadow Hawk One	1981	Horizon Simulations
Shadow World	1982	Synapse Software
Shaft Raider	1982	Program One, Inc.
Shamus	1982	Synapse Software
Shamus: Case II	1983	Synapse Software
Shanghai	1987	Activision
Shatablast	1983	Leisure and Business Developments Ltd.
Shiloh 1862	1983	Dynacomp
Shiloh: Grant's Trial in the West	1987	Strategic Simulations, Inc.
Ship	1993	Mirage Software
Ship of Stars	1983	K-Tek Software
Shit!	1993	ANG Software
Shogun Master	1990	Ralf David Hard und Software Entwicklung
Shoot'em Up! (Rino Marketing)	1986	Rino Marketing
Shooting Arcade	1982	Datasoft
Shooting Gallery (ANALOG Software)	1981	ANALOG Software
Shootout at the OK Galaxy	1982	Avalon Hill
Showdown Hockey!	1991	Aussemware
Shuffleboard		Aim Software
Shuffler	1983	Stack Computer Services
Shuttle Intercept	1982	Hayden Software
Sidewinder	1986	Futureware
Sidewinder II	1989	Mastertronic (UK)
Silent Service	1985	MicroProse Software
Silicon	1983	Romik Software
Silicon Dreams	1986	Rainbird
Silicon Warrior	1983	Epyx
Simple Minds	1994	ANG Software
Sisyphos	1993	Oddware
Six-Gun Shootout	1985	Strategic Simulations, Inc.
Skarbnik	1992	ASF
Ski-Weltcup	1984	Ariolasoft (Germany)
Skiing	1982	Centaursoft
Skulls	1991	Artacyis Software
Sky Blazer	1983	Brøderbund Software
Sky Rescue	1982	SubLOGIC
Sky Snakes	1981	Channel 8 Software
Skylighters	1984	ALA Software
Sleazy Adventure	1981	APX
Sleepwalker	1983	Aim Software
Slime	1982	Synapse Software
Slingshot	1988	Atari UK
Slinky!	1983	Cosmi
Slot Machine (Antic Software)	1986	Antic Software
Slot Machine (Ariolasoft (Germany))	1985	Ariolasoft (Germany)
Slot Machine (Homecomputer)	1984	Homecomputer
Slot Trivia	1982	T & F Software
Smack!	1984	Future Design Studios
Smack-Jack		Chip / Vogel-Verlag KG
Smasher	1983	APX
Smerfy	1992	SK Wizards
Smus	1993	LK Avalon
Snake Byte	1982	Sirius Software
Snake Pit		Aim Software
Snap II	1988	AMC-Verlag
Snapper (The)	1982	Silicon Valley Systems
Snark Hunt	1982	APX
Sneakers (1981 video game)	1981	Sirius Software
Snokie	1983	Funsoft, Inc.
Snooker / Billiards	1981	Thorn EMI (UK)
Snooper Troops	1982	Spinnaker Software
Snooper Troops: Case #2 - The Case of the Disappearing Dolphin	1982	Spinnaker Software
Soccer (1982 video game)	1982	Gamma Software
Soccer (Thorn EMI (UK))	1982	Thorn EMI (UK)
Soft Tools '86	1987	Psychological Software Services, Inc.
Softporn Adventure	1981	Sierra On-Line
SoftSide Adventure No. 4 - Jack the Ripper	1981	SoftSide Publications
SoftSide Adventure No. 10 - James Brand	1982	SoftSide Publications
SoftSide Adventure No. 13 - Arrow One	1982	SoftSide Publications
SoftSide Adventure No. 14 - Robin Hood	1982	SoftSide Publications
SoftSide Adventure No. 15 - The Mouse That Ate Chicago	1982	SoftSide Publications
SoftSide Adventure No. 17 - The Deadly Game	1982	SoftSide Publications
Sogon	1989	KE-Soft
Solar Star	1986	Microdaft
Solitaire	1981	APX
Solo Flight	1983	MicroProse Software
Solo Flight - Second Edition	1985	MicroProse Software
Sonic Death		Aim Software
Sons of Liberty	1988	Strategic Simulations, Inc.
Sorcerer	1984	Infocom
SOS Saturn	1992	Domain Software
Space Ace	1982	London Software
Space Bowl	1982	Gamma Software
Space Chase	1982	APX
Space Cowboy	1983	Avalon Hill
Space Eggs	1981	Sirius Software
Space Gunner	1986	Red Rat Software
Space Invaders	1980	Atari
Space Knights	1983	Reston Publishing Company
Space Lobsters	1987	Red Rat Software
Space Pirates 3000	1982	C & C Software
Space Rider	1990	Hi-Tec Software
Space Servo Station	1983	Aim Software
Space Shuttle	1983	Microdeal
Space Shuttle - Launch / Ascent to Orbit	1982	Starbound Software
Space Shuttle - Module One	1982	Swifty Software
Space Shuttle - Propellant Loading	1982	Starbound Software
Space Shuttle - Re-Entry	1983	Starbound Software
Space Shuttle: A Journey into Space	1983	Activision
Space Station Quest	1983	Aim Software
Space Station Zulu	1982	Avalon Hill
Space Tilt	1981	Dynacomp
Space Trap	1981	Artworx
Space Trek	1981	APX
Space War	1983	APX
Space Wars	1989	Byte Back
Space Zap	1983	FS, Inc.
Spaceport	1983	Umbrella Software, Inc.
Spare Change	1983	Brøderbund Software
Spark Bugs	1983	Romox
Special Delivery	1985	Creative Sparks
Special Forces	1993	Mirage Software
Speed Ace	1988	Zeppelin Games
Speed Fox	1992	Tiger Developments
Speed Hawk	1988	Atari UK
Speed King	1986	Mastertronic (USA)
Speed Run	1988	Red Rat Software
Speed Zone	1989	Mastertronic (UK)
Speedway Blast	1982	IDSI
Spellbound	1986	Mastertronic (UK)
Spellbreaker	1985	Infocom
Spelunker	1984	Brøderbund Software
Spider	1989	Secret Games
Spider City (Flash Gordon (1983))	1983	Sirius Software
Spider Invasion	1982	Cosmi
Spider Quake	1983	Gentry Software
Spiky Harold	1986	Firebird (UK)
Spindizzy	1986	Electric Dreams
Spite and Malice	1986	Cosmi
Spitfire '40	1986	Mirrorsoft
Spitfire Ace	1982	MicroProse Software
Spooky Castle	1988	Atlantis Software
Springer	1983	Tigervision
Spy Catcher	1983	ALA Software
Spy Hunter	1984	SEGA
Spy Master	1993	LK Avalon
Spy Strikes Back (The)	1983	Penguin Software
Spy vs. Spy (1984 video game)	1984	First Star Software
Spy vs. Spy II: The Island Caper	1985	First Star Software
Spy vs. Spy III: Arctic Antics	1986	Databyte
Spy's Demise	1983	Penguin Software
Square Pairs	1983	Scholastic, Inc.
Squish 'em	1983	Sirius Software
SS Achilles	1983	Beyond Software
Stack Up	1991	Zeppelin Games
Stage Coach Shootout	1984	ALA Software
Star Crystals	1983	PDI
Star Fleet I: The War Begins	1986	Interstel Corporation
Star Island	1982	Binary Computer Software
Star League Baseball	1983	Gamestar
Star Lords	1985	LotsaBytes
Star Maze	1983	Sir-Tech Software, Inc.
Star Raiders	1979	Atari
Star Raiders II	1986	Atari
Star Sentry	1982	ANALOG Software
Star Trek 3.2	1980	Dynacomp
Star Trek 3.5	1981	Adventure International
Star Trek: Strategic Operations Simulator	1983	SEGA
Star Voyage 1 / Star Voyage 2	1985	CodeWriter
Star Wars	1988	Domark
Star Wars: Return of the Jedi - Death Star Battle	1983	Parker Brothers
Star Wars: The Arcade Game	1984	Parker Brothers
Starball	1995	Mirage Software
Starbase Assault	1982	Pretzelland Software
Starbase Fighter	1983	Gentry Software
Starbase Hyperion	1981	Quality Software
Starblade	1986	Electric Dreams
Starbowl Football	1982	Gamestar
Starcross	1982	Infocom
Stardust		MR Datentechnik
Starfighters		Genesis Software
Stargate Courier	1983	Cosmi
Starion	1983	Romox
Starkstrom Seestern	1984	QuelleSoft
Starquake	1985	Bubble Bus Software
Starquest - Rescue at Rigel	1980	Epyx
Starquest - Star Warrior	1981	Epyx
Starship Duel	1982	PDI
StarTrak	1980	Programma International
Static	1994	ESC
Stationfall	1987	Infocom
Stealth (1984 video game)	1984	Brøderbund Software
Steeple Jack	1983	English Software Company
Stellar Conflict		Aim Software
Stellar Shuttle	1982	Brøderbund Software
Steve Davis Snooker		CDS Software
Stickybear Basketbounce	1983	Weekly Reader Family Software
Stickybear Bop	1982	Weekly Reader Family Software
Stock Broker	1983	ROM
Stock Market (Acorn Software)	1984	Acorn Software
Stock Market (ASP Software)	1982	ASP Software
Stock Market - The Game	1988	StarSoft Development Laboratories
Stomp (Optimized Systems Software, Inc.)	1981	Optimized Systems Software, Inc.
Stone of Sisyphus	1982	Adventure International
Stonequest	1984	LotsaBytes
Storm	1986	Mastertronic (UK)
Stranded	1984	English Software Company
Stratos	1982	Adventure International
Stratosphere	1987	Players
Street Attack		Shoesoft
Streets	1993	LK Avalon
Strip Poker	1983	Artworx
Stud Poker (Dynacomp)	1981	Dynacomp
Stun Trap	1982	Affine Software
Submarine Commander	1982	Thorn EMI (UK)
Submarine Minefield	1980	Sebree's Computing
Sultan's Palace	1981	APX
Summer Games	1984	Epyx
Sun Star	1986	CRL
Sunday Golf	1980	Adventure International
Suomi World Cup '91	1991	Davicopy
Super Breakout	1979	Atari
Super Bunny	1984	Datamost, Inc.
Super Cobra	1983	Parker Brothers
Super Cubes / Slip	1981	Thorn EMI (UK)
Super Fortuna	1993	Mirage Software
Super Gärtner	1985	Europa Computer-Club
Super Huey UH-IX	1986	Cosmi
Super Rover	1984	T & G Software
Super Stud Poker	1985	LotsaBytes
Super Tank Attack!	1983	Dynacomp
Super Zaxxon	1983	SEGA
Super-Snake	1984	Europa Computer-Club
Superball	1986	Irata Verlag
Superman: The Game	1986	Prism Leisure Corporation
Surrender at Stalingrad	1986	DKG
Survival (Task Force Computer Games)	1983	Task Force Computer Games
Survival Adventure	1980	United Software of America
Survival of the Fittest	1982	IDSI
Survivor (1982 video game)	1982	Synapse Software
Survivors	1987	Atlantis Software
Suspect	1984	Infocom
Suspended	1983	Infocom
Swamp Chomp	1982	PDI
Swede 1	1981	SBS Software
Swiat Olkiego	1994	StanBit
Syn Boga Wiatru	1993	LK Avalon
System 8	1988	Blue Ribbon Software
T-34 - The Battle	1994	Mirage Software
Table Football	1987	Rino Marketing
TAC - Tactical Armor Command	1983	Avalon Hill
Tactic	1992	Sonix Software
Tactrek	1982	APX
Tagalon		Tynesoft
Taipei XL 1.1	1989	R+E Software
Tales of Dragons and Cavemen	1986	AMC-Verlag
Tanium	1988	Players
Tank Arkade	1982	Avalon Hill
Tank Trap	1980	Quality Software
Tank vs. Tank	1993	Mirage Software
Tanks	1991	Mirage Software
Tanks and Squads	1982	C & C Software
Tanktics: Computer Game of Armored Combat on the Eastern Front	1981	Avalon Hill
Tapper	1984	SEGA
Target Chase		Sears
Target Practice	1983	Gentry Software
Tari Trek	1980	Quality Software
Tarkus and the Crystal of Fear	1992	Tiger Developments
Tauz / Kelb	1988	Rassilon Software
Tawerna	1993	Mirage Software
Tax Dodge	1982	Island Graphics
Taxicab Hill	1985	Antic Software
Teacher Killer	1994	Sikor Soft
Technoid	1995	StanBit
Technus	1993	Mirage Software
Tecno-Ninja	1990	KE-Soft
Tekblast	1998	Sikor Soft
Telefon Terror	1984	Irata Verlag
Telengard	1982	Avalon Hill
Temple of Apshai Trilogy	1985	Epyx
Temple of Darkness		Aim Software
Terminator (The)	1993	Domain Software
Tetrad	1983	Hayden Software
TGIF	1983	Avalon Hill
The Arcade Machine	1982	Brøderbund Software
The Battle of Chickamauga	1984	GDW
The Battle of Shiloh	1982	Strategic Simulations, Inc.
The Blade of Blackpoole	1982	Sirius Software
The Cosmic Balance	1982	Strategic Simulations, Inc.
The Dallas Quest	1984	Datasoft
The Dreadnaught Factor	1984	Activision
The Eidolon	1985	Epyx
The Eliminator	1982	Adventure International
The Eternal Dagger	1987	Strategic Simulations, Inc.
The Final Conflict	1983	Hayden Software
The Goonies (1985 video game)	1985	Datasoft
The Great American Cross-Country Road Race	1985	Activision
The Guild of Thieves	1987	Rainbird
The Halley Project	1985	Mindscape
The Hitchhiker's Guide to the Galaxy	1984	Infocom
The Last V8	1985	Mastertronic (UK)
The Living Daylights	1987	Domark
The Lurking Horror	1987	Infocom
The Mask of the Sun	1984	Brøderbund Software
The Pawn	1985	Rainbird
The Pharaoh's Curse	1983	Synapse Software
The Price of Magik	1986	Level 9 Computing
The Return of Heracles	1983	Quality Software
The Sands of Egypt	1982	Datasoft
The Scrolls of Abadon	1984	Access Software
The Serpent's Star	1984	Brøderbund Software
The Seven Cities of Gold	1984	Electronic Arts
The Shattered Alliance	1981	Strategic Simulations, Inc.
The Tail of Beta Lyrae	1983	Datamost, Inc.
The Witness (1983 video game)	1983	Infocom
Theatre Europe	1985	PSS
Thinker	1992	Mirage Software
Thinx	1993	ANG Software
Thrax Lair	1982	Rantom Software
Three Holiday Games	1982	APX
Threshold	1982	Sierra On-Line
Thrust	1986	Firebird (UK)
Thunder Island	1981	ANALOG Software
Thunderbombs	1983	Penguin Software
Thunderfox	1988	Atari
Tiger Attack	1988	Atari UK
Tiger Hunters	1983	ALA Software
Tigers in the Snow	1981	Strategic Simulations, Inc.
Tigris	1988	R+E Software
Timber!	1983	MMG Micro Software
Time and Magik	1988	Level 9 Computing
Time Bandit	1984	Atari Elektronik
Time Bomb (Clearstar Softechnologies)	1987	Clearstar Softechnologies
Time Bomb (PDI)	1980	PDI
Time Bomb (Swifty Software)	1981	Swifty Software
Time Runner	1982	Funsoft, Inc.
Time Traveler (1980 video game)	1980	Krell Software
Time Warp	1982	English Software Company
Timeslip	1990	Byte Back
Titan (Atlantis Software)	1990	Atlantis Software
TKKG - Das Leere Grab im Moor	1985	Europa Computer-Club
Toboggan Run	1983	ALA Software
Tomahawk	1986	Digital Integration
Top Secret	1993	Mirage Software
Topper	1982	Romox
Touch	1985	Europa Computer-Club
Touchdown Football	1986	Electronic Arts
Tour de France	1991	Davicopy
Track & Field	1984	Atari
Track Attack	1982	Brøderbund Software
Tractor Beam	1980	CE Software
Trailblazer	1986	Gremlin Graphics
Train Dispatcher	1983	Signal Computer Consultants
Trains	1983	Spinnaker Software
Transmuter	1987	Code Masters
Transylvania	1984	Penguin Software
Treasure Island	1982	Crystalware
Treasure Quest	1981	Adventure International
Triad	1982	Adventure International
Trion	1983	London Software
Trip to Jupiter	1981	Sebree's Computing
Triple Pack	1986	Access Software
Trisz Divinis	1993	ASF
Triumph	1994	ESC
Trivia Arcade (The)	1984	Screenplay
Trivia Fever	1985	Professional Software, Inc.
Trivia Mania	1985	XLEnt Software
Trivia Quest	1984	Royal Software
Trivia Trek	1982	Swifty Software
Trivia Unlimited	1980	Creative Computing Software
Trivial Pursuit		Domark
Trix	1992	LK Avalon
Troll's Tale	1984	Sierra On-Line
Trolls and Tribulations	1984	Creative Software
Tron	1992	Mirage Software
Trucker / Streets of the City	1981	Creative Computing Software
Trull	1984	Europa Computer-Club
Trust	1983	Rantom Software
TT Racer	1982	Centaursoft
Tube Baddies	1995	Micro Discount
Tumble Bugs	1982	Datasoft
Turbican	1993	ASF
Turbo Tenis	1988	Turbo Software
Turboflex	1982	Llamasoft
Turf-Form	1988	Blue Ribbon Software
Turmoil (1982 video game)	1982	Sirius Software
Tusker	1993	Mirage Software
Tutti Frutti	1982	Adventure International
Twerps	1981	Sirius Software
Twilight World	1986	Atari UK
Tycoon: The Commodity Market Simulation	1983	Blue Chip Software
Typo Attack	1984	Atari
U-Boot (Das)	1985	Rushware
U.S.A.A.F. - United States Army Air Force	1985	Strategic Simulations, Inc.
U235	1992	LK Avalon
Uczen Czarnoksieznika	1992	LK Avalon
Ultima I: The First Age of Darkness	1983	Sierra On-Line
Ultima II: The Revenge of the Enchantress	1983	Sierra On-Line
Ultima III: Exodus	1983	Origin Systems
Ultima IV: Quest of the Avatar	1985	Origin Systems
Underwater Cavern	1983	ALA Software
Universal Hero	1987	Mastertronic (UK)
Universe (1983 video game)	1984	Omnitrend Software
Up'n Down	1984	SEGA
Up, Up and Away	1983	Starcade Software
Upiór	1992	LK Avalon
Valdez	1981	Dynacomp
Valley (The)	1982	ASP Software
Valley of the Kings	1982	Dynacomp
Value Pack #1	1982	Adventure International
Value Pack #2	1982	Adventure International
Value Pack #3	1982	Adventure International
Value Pack #4	1982	Adventure International
Vampire	1983	Aim Software
Vaults of Zurich (The)	1982	Artworx
VC	1983	Avalon Hill
Vengeance		Aim Software
Venus Venture	1983	Aim Software
Venus Voyager	1982	English Software Company
Venus Voyager 2	1983	English Software Company
Vicky	1992	LK Avalon
Video Classics	1988	Firebird (UK)
Video Easel	1980	Atari
Video Poker / Vegas Jackpot	1986	Mastertronic
Video Vegas	1986	Baudville
Video Yahtze	1983	Sunset Software
Viper	1982	Aim Software
Visualizer Jigsaw Game	1984	Maximus, Inc.
Volcano	1982	ALA Software
Vorrak	1983	Avalon Hill
Voyage in Time	1983	ALA Software
Voyager I	1982	Avalon Hill
Wall Street Challenge	1979	Image Computer Products
WallWar	1982	Sierra On-Line
War	1982	Adventure International
War at Sea	1980	CE Software
War in Russia	1983	Strategic Simulations, Inc.
War of the Worlds (The)	1983	Task Force Computer Games
War-Copter	1986	Red Rat Software
Wargame Construction Set	1986	Strategic Simulations, Inc.
WarGames	1984	Coleco
Wargle!	1983	Hayden Software
Warhawk (1986 video game)	1986	Firebird (UK)
Warlock's Revenge	1982	Synergistic Software
Warlok	1983	Calisto Software
Warp Zone	1985	Challenger Software International
Warriors of Ras	1986	All American Adventures
Warriors of Ras - Dunzhin	1982	Screenplay
Warriors of Ras - Kaiv	1982	Screenplay
Warriors of Ras - The Wylde	1982	Screenplay
Warriors of Ras - Ziggurat	1982	Screenplay
Warship	1986	Strategic Simulations, Inc.
Warships	1981	CE Software
Water Torture	1983	Aim Software
Waterloo 1815		Dynacomp
Waterloo II	1981	Crystalware
Wavy Navy	1983	Sirius Software
Wayout	1982	Sirius Software
Weakon	1983	APX
Webster - The Word Game	1983	CBS Software
Weltraumkolonie	1984	Ravensburger
What's Different?	1979	PDI
Wheel of Fortune	1988	ShareData, Inc.
Wheeler Dealers	1981	Prophecy Investments, Inc.
Whirlinurd	1985	US Gold
Whistler's Brother	1984	Brøderbund Software
White Barrows (The)	1983	ASP Software
Who Dares Wins II	1987	Tynesoft
Whomper Stomper	1984	Adventure International
Whoops!	1992	Mirage Software
Whoops! II	1993	ANG Software
Wilde 15	1985	Europa Computer-Club
Wilder Westen	1984	Europa Computer-Club
Willy Geht Wandern	1984	QuelleSoft
Winged Samurai	1980	Discovery Games
Wingman	1983	MicroProse Software
Winter Challenge	1988	Thunder Mountain
Winter Events	1988	Anco Software
Winter Olympiad '88	1988	Tynesoft
Winter Olympics (1986 video game)	1987	Tynesoft
Winter Wally	1987	Alternative Software
Wishbringer	1985	Infocom
Wizard of Wor	1981	Roklan
Wizard's Crown	1986	Strategic Simulations, Inc.
Wizard's Gold	1981	APX
Wizard's Revenge	1981	APX
Wizards and Dragons	1983	ALA Software
Wladca	1993	Mirage Software
Wladcy Ciemnosci	1993	LK Avalon
Wloczykij	1993	LK Avalon
Wombats I	1984	Dynamic Software Design
Word Hanger	1982	Interceptor Software
Word Olympics	1983	English Software Company
Word Search - French	1981	PDI
Word Search - Geography	1980	PDI
Word Search - Spanish	1981	PDI
Word Search Generator	1982	APX
Word Spinner	1984	Learning Company (The)
Word-Scramble	1980	THESIS
Wordfind Magic	1983	Computer Creations
Wordmaker	1982	APX
Wordmania	1982	Syncro, Inc.
World Cup 1986	1986	Corbishley, P. M.
World Cup Manager	1987	STV Software
World Karate Championship	1986	Epyx
World of Zenobia (The)	1988	Katt-Ware
World Series	1981	Ramware
World Soccer	1990	Zeppelin Games
World War III	1981	Crystal Computer
Worm	1985	WizardSoft
Worm War I	1982	Sirius Software
Worms?	1983	Electronic Arts
Wuerfel Kniffel		Atari Elektronik
Wumpus Adventure	1980	Sebree's Computing
Wyprawy Kupca	1993	Mirage Software
Wyzle!	1983	APX
Xenon Raid	1983	English Software Company
Xtal - Adventure in Space	1985	Antic Software
Yahtman	1981	Computer Core Software
Yogi Bear and Friends in the Greed Monster	1990	Hi-Tec Software
Yogi's Great Escape	1990	Hi-Tec Software
Yokyu II - Globetrotter	1984	Atari Elektronik
Zador	1990	KE-Soft
Zador II	1992	KE-Soft
Zap (Code Works (The))	1980	Code Works (The)
Zap (Programma International)	1980	Programma International
Zardon	1982	Crystalware
Zaxxon	1983	SEGA
Zbir	1993	Mirage Software
Zebu-Land	1990	KE-Soft
Zenji	1984	Activision
Zeppelin (1983 video game)	1983	Synapse Software
Zero War	1991	Byte Back
Zeus	1993	LK Avalon
Zip Zap Zonked	1983	K-Tek Software
Zoltan Escape	1989	B.Ware
Zone Ranger	1984	Activision
Zone X	1985	Gremlin Graphics
Zork I	1981	Infocom
Zork II	1982	Infocom
Zork III	1983	Infocom
Zorro (1985 video game)	1985	US Gold
Zulu Warpath	1983	Aim Software
Zumbaja	1993	Krysal
Zybex	1988	Zeppelin Games

== Compilations ==
There are 27 games released on 8 commercial compilations

Title	Publisher	Year
4 Star Compilation - Volume 2 (Disc Hopper)	Red Rat Software	
Adventure Pak (Quest for Gold, Moon Survival, Volcano, Super Sleuth)	Keypunch Software	
Casten Game Disk (Risky Rescue, Escape from Epsilon+, Advent X-5, Biffdrop, Box-in, Crazy Harold's Adroit Adventure, Nemesis, Risky Rescue Industrial Version, Biffdrop Nightmare Version)	Antic	1985
Four Great Games vol. 3 (Rebound, Count Down)	Micro-Value	1987
Gambler (Blackjack, Poker, Slots, Horses)	Keypunch Software	1985
Sample Casette (Pumkin Stand)	PDI	1981
Space Games (Alien Attack, Missile Commander, Shuttle Commander, Space Capture)	Keypunch Software	1985
Strategy Pack II (Snake Hunt, Tunnels)	Image Computer Products	1979

== Expansions ==
There are 66 expansions on this list.

Title	Year	Publisher
221B Baker Street - Case Library #1	1987	Datasoft
221B Baker Street - Case Library #2	1987	Datasoft
5x5 Edytor Hasel	1995	Sikor Soft
Computer Baseball 1983 Team Disk		Strategic Simulations, Inc.
Computer Baseball 1984 Team Disk		Strategic Simulations, Inc.
Computer Quarterback - 1984 NFL Teams Data Disk	1985	Strategic Simulations, Inc.
Computer Quarterback - 1985 NFL Teams Data Disk	1986	Strategic Simulations, Inc.
Computer Quarterback - 1986 NFL Teams Data Disk	1987	Strategic Simulations, Inc.
Cosmic Balance Shipyard Disk		Strategic Simulations, Inc.
Crosscheck Data Disk - Adults		Datasoft
Crosscheck Data Disk - Children		Datasoft
Eastern Front (1941) Scenario Editor	1982	APX
Eastern Front (1941) Scenarios 1942, 1943, 1944	1983	APX
Galaxy II - Basic Facts	1983	Random House, Inc.
Galaxy II - Decimals	1983	Random House, Inc.
Galaxy II - Fractions I / Fractions II	1983	Random House, Inc.
Galaxy II - Integers	1983	Random House, Inc.
Galaxy II - Place Value	1983	Random House, Inc.
Galaxy II - Rounding and Estimating	1983	Random House, Inc.
Gauntlet - Deeper Dungeons	1985	US Gold
Grand Prix - Decimals	1983	Random House, Inc.
Grand Prix - Fractions I / Fractions II	1983	Random House, Inc.
Grand Prix - Integers	1983	Random House, Inc.
Grand Prix - Place Value	1983	Random House, Inc.
Grand Prix - Rounding and Estimating	1983	Random House, Inc.
Grand Prix - Whole Numbers	1983	Random House, Inc.
Kampfgruppe Scenario Disk I	1985	Strategic Simulations, Inc.
KE-Soft Leveldisk	1991	KE-Soft
Micro League Baseball - Box Score / Stats Compiler Disk	1986	Micro League Sports Association
Micro League Baseball - General Manager / Owner's Disk	1985	Micro League Sports Association
Micro League Baseball - Player Stats / Team Disk - 1982 Teams	1984	Micro League Sports Association
Micro League Baseball - Player Stats / Team Disk - 1983 Teams	1984	Micro League Sports Association
Micro League Baseball - Player Stats / Team Disk - 1984 Teams	1984	Micro League Sports Association
Micro League Baseball - Player Stats / Team Disk - 1985 Teams	1985	Micro League Sports Association
Micro League Baseball - Player Stats / Team Disk - 1986 Teams	1986	Micro League Sports Association
Micro League Baseball - Player Stats / Team Disk - 1987 Teams	1987	Micro League Sports Association
Micro League Baseball - Player Stats / Team Disk - 1988 Teams	1988	Micro League Sports Association
Micro League Baseball - Player Stats / Team Disk - 1989 Teams	1989	Micro League Sports Association
Micro League Baseball - Player Stats / Team Disk - All-Star Rosters		Micro League Sports Association
Micro League Baseball - Player Stats / Team Disk - Franchise History - Brooklyn / Los Angeles Dodgers	1984	Micro League Sports Association
Micro League Baseball - Player Stats / Team Disk - Franchise History - Minnesota Twins	1984	Micro League Sports Association
Micro League Baseball - Player Stats / Team Disk - Franchise History - New York Mets	1984	Micro League Sports Association
Micro League Baseball - Player Stats / Team Disk - Franchise History - New York Yankees	1984	Micro League Sports Association
Micro League Baseball - Player Stats / Team Disk - World Series Teams - 1950's	1984	Micro League Sports Association
Micro League Baseball - Player Stats / Team Disk - World Series Teams - 1960's	1984	Micro League Sports Association
Micro League Baseball - Player Stats / Team Disk - World Series Teams - 1970's	1984	Micro League Sports Association
Micro League Baseball - Team / Roster Security Disk	1984	Micro League Sports Association
Sexy Six Data Disk #1	1995	Sikor Soft
Sexy Six Data Disk #2	1995	Sikor Soft
Sexy Six Data Disk #3	1995	Sikor Soft
Strip Poker Data Disk #1	1983	Artworx
Strip Poker Data Disk #2	1983	Artworx
Strip Poker Data Disk #3	1983	Artworx
SubLOGIC Scenery Disk - Japan		SubLOGIC
SubLOGIC Scenery Disk #1		SubLOGIC
SubLOGIC Scenery Disk #11		SubLOGIC
SubLOGIC Scenery Disk #2		SubLOGIC
SubLOGIC Scenery Disk #3		SubLOGIC
SubLOGIC Scenery Disk #4		SubLOGIC
SubLOGIC Scenery Disk #5		SubLOGIC
SubLOGIC Scenery Disk #6		SubLOGIC
SubLOGIC Scenery Disk #7		SubLOGIC
SubLOGIC Scenery Disk #9		SubLOGIC
SubLOGIC Star Scenery Disk - San Francisco and the Bay Area		SubLOGIC
Trivia Quest Utility Disk	1984	Royal Software
Trivia Trek [data disks]		Swifty Software
