= Twerps =

Twerps may refer to:

- Twerps (band), an Australian indie pop band
- Twerps (video game)
- TWERPS, a 1987 role-playing game
- Tunbridge Wells and Eridge Railway Preservation Society (TWERPS), see Spa Valley Railway
