= Space Cowboy =

Space Cowboy may refer to:

== People ==
- Space Cowboy (performer) (born 1978), an Australian performance artist
- Space Cowboy (musician), stage name for Nick Dresti, an electronic music producer and performer
- Spacecowboy, a South Korean composer, record producer, singer and songwriter, who is a member of OnePiece

== Music ==
- "Space Cowboy", a song by the Steve Miller Band from the 1969 album Brave New World
  - "The Joker", a 1973 song by the Steve Miller Band, often mistakenly called "Space Cowboy" because of the opening line referencing their previous song.
- "Space Cowboy" (Banaroo song), from the album Banaroo's World
- "Space Cowboy", a song from the 1983 Jonzun Crew album Lost in Space
- "Space Cowboy" (Jamiroquai song), a song from the 1994 Jamiroquai album The Return of the Space Cowboy
- "Space Cowboy", a song from the 1997 Savage album Babylon
- "Space Cowboy", a song from the 2000 NSYNC album No Strings Attached
- "Space Cowboy", a song from the 2000 Scooter album Sheffield
- "Space Cowboy", a song from the 2012 album "Eye of the Hurricane" by Ilse DeLange
- "Space Cowboy", a song from the 2010 Abney Park album The End of Days
- "Space Cowboy" (Kacey Musgraves song), from the 2018 album Golden Hour
- "Space Cowboy", a song from the 2021 ZillaKami album DOG BOY

== Other uses ==
- Sugar Land Space Cowboys, the Triple-A affiliate of the Houston Astros in Minor League Baseball
- Space Cowboy (video game), a 1983 video game from Avalon Hill
- Space Cowboy Online, alternative name in North America for the role playing game Ace Online
- "The Space Cowboy", a character in the Stephen King novel Gerald's Game
- "Deep Space Cowboys" is a term used in the Stephen King novel Lisey's Story
- The phrase "see you space cowboy" at the end of nearly every episode of the anime series Cowboy Bebop
- Paulson, an Old West cowboy abducted by aliens in the Mothership Zeta add-on for Fallout 3
- Space Cowboy (film), 2024 documentary film

== See also ==
- Space Cowboys, 2000 Clint Eastwood film
- "Spaced Cowboy", a song by Sly and the Family Stone from the 1971 LP There's a Riot Goin' On
- Space Western, a genre often incorporating cowboys in outer space
- Space pirates, often depicted as gunslingers rather than swordfighters
