= Thrax Lair =

1982 video game

- Publisher: Rantom Software
- Designer: Randy Turner
- Platform: Atari 8-bit
- Release: 1982
- Genre: Scrolling shooter

Thrax Lair is a vertically scrolling shooter designed by Randy Turner and published by Rantom Software in 1982 for Atari 8-bit computers. The game is similar in concept to Caverns of Mars from 1981. A version of Thrax Lair for the Commodore 64 was planned, but never released.

== Gameplay ==
Viewed from a top-down perspective, the player controls a pterodactyl like creature on a raid into an underground lair of the insects. The player can fire energy bursts in the front, left and right, and the diagonal front directions. Points are scored by shooting enemies and the faster the player flies the more points are earned.

== Reception ==
Norman Schreiber reviewed Thrax Lair for Electronic Fun with Computers & Games magazine, and he gave it a 2 out of 5 rating. He concluded: "Thrax Lair certainly is a logical idea for a game. The tragedy is that it's only slightly better than boring."

Bill Kunkel wrote in the July 1983 issue of Electronic Games: "With a collection of fantastic sound effects and first rate, if spare, graphics, Thrax Lair makes for an extremely compelling action challenge". He compared the vertically scrolling gameplay to Caverns of Mars. The 1984 Software Encyclopedia from Electronic Games called Thrax Lair "exciting if ultimately repetitive."

== See also ==
- List of Atari 8-bit computer games
