= Galactic Chase =

1981 video game

- Publisher: Spectrum Computers
- Programmer: Anthony Weber
- Platform: Atari 8-bit
- Release: 1981
- Genre: Fixed shooter

Galactic Chase is a fixed shooter video game for Atari 8-bit computers published by Spectrum Computers in 1981. It is a clone of Namco's Galaxian programmed by Anthony Weber.

== Gameplay ==
Galactic Chase is a game in which invaders attack Earth, and formations can sometimes break off from the main force to attack directly.

== Reception ==
John J. Anderson reviewed Galactic Chase for Computer Gaming World in 1982, and stated that:

The real moments in this game come when you are attacked by formations on all sides–four, six, or more aliens bent on bombing or ramming you out of existence. The novice will not survive an assault like this. However, with much practice, you can learn to "spear" the enemy, vaporizing them on the nosecone of your ship. This calls for nimble steering, needless to say, and all the while you must fire at your other attackers."

BYTE in June 1982 described the game as an interesting variant of Galaxian. While disliking the "cosmic dandruff" background lights, the magazine otherwise approved of its gameplay and graphics, concluding that "Galactic Chase is a natural for any Atari owner's game library".
