= Reversal (video game) =

1981 video game

- Publisher: Hayden Software
- Programmers: Dan Spracklen; Kathe Spracklen
- Platforms: Apple II, Atari 8-bit, Commodore 64
- Release: 1981: Apple; 1983: Atari, C64
- Genre: Strategy

Reversal is a strategy video game published by Hayden Software for the Apple II in 1981. Versions for the Atari 8-bit computers and Commodore 64 followed in 1983.

== Gameplay ==
Reversal is a computer version of the board game Othello.

== Reception ==
Bob Boyd reviewed the game for Computer Gaming World, and stated that "Othello is a classic strategy game. This is an accurate adaptation for the computer with various features to enhance the game. Reversal plays quickly and easily, the graphics are good, and the computer can be hard to beat. It is excellent and I recommend it." InfoWorld's Essential Guide to Atari Computers recommended the game as a good example of computerized Othello.
