= Guderian (video game) =

1987 video game

- Publisher(s): Avalon Hill
- Platform(s): Apple II, Atari 8-bit, Commodore 64
- Release: 1987
- Genre(s): Wargame

Guderian is a computer wargame published by Avalon Hill in 1987.

== Gameplay ==
Guderian is a game in which the German drive on Smolensk during 1941 is simulated.

== Reception ==
William H. Harrington reviewed the game for Computer Gaming World, and stated that "Guderian is a very playable game with options that help gamers avoid some of the complexity and lugubrious pace of other products."
