= Guns of Fort Defiance =

1981 strategy video game

- Publisher: The Avalon Hill Game Company
- Platforms: Apple II, Atari 8-bit, Commodore 64, PET, TRS-80
- Release: 1981
- Genre: Strategy

Guns of Fort Defiance is an American computer wargame published in 1982 by The Avalon Hill Game Company.

== Gameplay ==
Guns of Fort Defiance is a game in which the player is in command of an American artillery gun crew in the War of 1812.

== Reception ==
Johnny L. Wilson reviewed the game for Computer Gaming World, and stated that "Guns of Fort Defiance is an exciting addition to a game library because: 1) it offers a challenging game without tying the player up for long time periods; 2) it's easy to teach the mechanics to a beginner; and 3) the handicap system enables the game to grow with your own ability."
