= Baja Buggies =

1982 video game

- Developers: Arcade Plus; Gamestar
- Publisher: Gamestar
- Designer: Dan Ugrin
- Platform: Atari 8-bit
- Release: 1982
- Genre: Racing

Baja Buggies is a desert-themed racing video game for Atari 8-bit computers designed by Dan Ugrin. It uses a third-person, 2.5D perspective. The game was originally developed and sold as Night Rally by Arcade Plus.

== Gameplay ==
The player's green car, driving across the desert at 80 MPH

Baja Buggies is an off-road race through the desert against 80 opponents Most of the racers are anonymous. The top three have names that play on those of real drivers, such as "A. J. Cactus" (similar to A. J. Foyt). The game displays the player's current rank, and a radar shows relative position to the race leaders. The goal is to finish in the top six. The joystick steers left and right and the button applies the brakes. Acceleration is automatic. The race ends when the last car of the leading group finishes–or if the player crashes too many times.

There are three courses: beginner, pro, and a random course that's also classified as pro-level.

== Development ==
The game was originally designed and programmed by Dan Ugrin and sold as Night Rally by Arcade Plus. After the company folded, it was revamped and became the first release from Gamestar. Gamestar went on to publish a series of sports games for the Atari 8-bit and Commodore 64, several of which were programmed by Ugrin, before becoming a label of Activision.

== Reception ==
Electronic Fun with Computers & Games favorably compared Baja Buggies to Sega's Turbo, but found the audio to be simplistic and disliked the lack of support for paddle controllers. Marc Benioff, reviewing the game for Antic, wrote "It has some similarities to Turbo by Sega, but is not a copy." Page 6 wrote, "What makes Baja Buggies special is the unique 3-D perspective as you drive toward the distant mountains. When you turn a corner, you really do turn–the mountains and sky scroll across and you feel as if you are really in the car."

The reviewer for The Book of Atari Software 1983 found the game became boring in long stretches without seeing another vehicle. They also didn't like the game immediately ending once the leading group crosses the finish line and would have preferred to finish the entire race.

Antic concluded, "Baja Buggies is an excellent product. Compared to driving games of the past, this is a programming masterpiece." In a review for Electronic Games, Bill Kunkel wrote, "Put flat-out, this is the best racing contest, in terms of graphics and game play, ever designed for a computer system." Several years after release Atari Explorer called it, "the first computer program to seriously court the favor of race car fans".

== See also ==
- The Great American Cross-Country Road Race
