= Pathfinder (video game) =

1982 video game

- Developer: Solitare Group
- Publisher: Gebelli Software
- Designer: Randy Jongens
- Platform: Atari 8-bit
- Release: 1982
- Genre: Maze

Pathfinder is a maze shooter written by Randy Jongens for Atari 8-bit computers. It was published in 1982 by Gebelli Software.

== Gameplay ==
In-game screenshot

The object of Pathfinder is to clean an underground maze of canisters of radioactive waste. These canisters are scattered in the maze and can be collected on contact by the Pathfinder, controlled by the player. Complicating this, radioactive creatures will attempt to stop the player. These are: Nukes, absorbing power from nuclear waste, Phantoms, moving through walls and Minelayers moving throughout the whole level placing mines. To defend himself the player is armed with a plasma gun that can be fired in any of eight directions. If the player shoots a mine, he will start a fire, which can spread through a maze.

A level is completed by removing all radioactive waste. The game has nine levels, each characterized by color changes and sometimes changes in the structure of the maze itself.

== Reception ==
The Addison-Wesley Book of Atari Software 1984 concluded: "It's very hard to classify this game as either good or bad. While on the one hand it appeared to be a superficial and repetitious game, many of the teens who played it enjoyed seeing half of the maze on fire and then trying to put it out."
