= Planet Miners =

1980 video game

- Publisher: Avalon Hill
- Platforms: TRS-80, Apple II, Atari 8-bit, PET
- Release: 1980: TRS-80; 1981: Atari, PET

Planet Miners (sometimes The Planet Miners) is a game published by the Microcomputer Games division of Avalon Hill for the TRS-80 Level II microcomputer in 1980. It was ported to the Atari 8-bit computers, Apple II, and Commodore PET. The game is written in BASIC.

== Plot summary ==
Planet Miners is a game that involves four corporations trying to control the mining rights on the nine planets of Earth's solar system.

== Reception ==
Joseph T. Suchar reviewed Planet Miners in The Space Gamer No. 32. Suchar commented that "Overall I found it tedious. I would not recommend it."
