= Clear for Action =

1984 naval video game

- Publisher: The Avalon Hill Game Company
- Platforms: Atari 8-bit, TRS-80
- Release: 1984

Clear for Action is a 1984 video game published by The Avalon Hill Game Company.

== Gameplay ==
Clear for Action is a game in which up to eight players can fight battles between multiple ships, set in the era of sailing ships.

== Reception ==
Floyd Mathews reviewed the game for Computer Gaming World, and stated that "CFA is an entertaining game, which I recommend for both experienced and novice wargamers. Good luck, and may your swash never buckle!"
