= Computer Ambush =

1980 video game

- Publisher(s): Strategic Simulations
- Platform(s): Apple II, Atari 8-bit
- Release: 1980: Apple II; 1984: Atari 8-bit 1985: Apple 2nd edition

Computer Ambush is a 1980 video game published by Strategic Simulations.

== Gameplay ==
Computer Ambush is a game in which the player controls 10 soldiers in man-to-man combat in World War II.

== Reception ==
David Long reviewed the game for Computer Gaming World, stating that: "Computer Ambush (Second Edition) has been well worth the wait! It's fast, smooth flowing, and surprisingly realistic. This game could set the standard for tactical simulations for a long time to come. At least, until the Third Edition comes out."
