= Six-Gun Shootout =

1985 video game

- Publisher: Strategic Simulations
- Writer: Jeff Johnson
- Platforms: Apple II, Atari 8-bit, Commodore 64
- Release: 1985
- Genre: Turn-based strategy

Six-Gun Shootout (shown on the title screen as Sixgun Shootout) is a video game written by Jeff Johnson for Atari 8-bit computers and published in 1985 by Strategic Simulations.

== Gameplay ==
Six-Gun Shootout is a game in which man-to-man combat is simulated in ten scenarios set in the Wild West.

== Reception ==
Johnny Wilson reviewed the game for Computer Gaming World, and stated that "SG is an relatively simple, fast-moving and enjoyable game. It is satisfying and clear-cut in its determination of victory points and victory."
