= Journey to the Planets =

1982 video game

- Publishers: JV Software; Roklan Software
- Designer: Jack Verson
- Platform: Atari 8-bit
- Release: 1982: JV Software; 1983: Roklan
- Genre: Action-adventure
- Mode: Single-player

Journey to the Planets is a video game for Atari 8-bit computers. The player takes on the role of an interplanetary adventurer who has to solve various puzzles on the planets on which he lands. The game was originally released on disk and cassette in 1982 by JV Software. In 1983, Roklan Software published a cartridge version with some differences from the original.

== Plot ==

At the start of the game, the character is located on a strange planet where the character can equip itself with a weapon, refuel energy, and take off to space in a spaceship. The character then needs to pilot through space while avoiding comets and conserving energy until a new planet is found for exploration. After landing on the newly discovered planet, the character needs to fend off hostile aliens, solve puzzles, and recover various artifacts. Energy is consumed by the spaceship, the weapon, and upon dying.

The goal is to return to the character's home planet by exploring the universe and solving the various puzzles being presented with.
