= Controller (video game) =

1982 simulation video game

- Developer: Microcomputer Games
- Publisher: Avalon Hill
- Designer: William David Volk
- Platforms: Apple II, Atari 8-bit
- Release: 1982
- Genre: Simulation

Controller is a simulation video game published in 1982 for the Apple II and Atari 8-bit computers by The Avalon Hill Game Company and developed by its division Microcomputer Games.

== Gameplay ==
Controller is a game in which the player is an air traffic controller.

== Reception ==
Bill Willett reviewed the game for Computer Gaming World, and stated that "I would recommend Controller to those who would like a "thinking" game that doesn't let you dawdle around moving planes like chessmen. The arcade player, however, may be disappointed with the slow (real time) action of the game."
