= Twilight World (video game) =

1986 video game

- Developer: Matthew Trimby
- Publisher: Atari Corporation
- Platform: Atari 8-bit
- Release: 1986
- Genre: Platform
- Mode: Single-player

Twilight World is a 1986 platform video game developed and programmed by Matthew Trimby and published by Atari Corporation for the Atari 8-bit computers. Players guide a lone hero through eleven dungeons, collecting gems, avoiding traps, and battling creatures to reach each level's exit.

== Gameplay ==
The player stands on the edge of a disappearing bridge above a pit of flames, approaching a collectible gem.

In Twilight World, players navigate a side-scrolling series of eleven dungeon levels, each packed with traps, monsters, and collectible items. The objective is to reach the exit of each dungeon, sometimes requiring specific conditions such as collecting a number of gems. The player controls a lone character equipped with a blaster weapon and the ability to jump, kneel, and duck enemy attacks.

Creatures populate the dungeons at various heights, requiring the player to jump, duck, or shoot strategically. The hero's vitality bar depletes upon contact with enemies or their projectiles, but can be replenished with food scattered throughout the levels. Players gain extra lives by collecting thirty gems, clearing all gems in a dungeon, or completing all eleven dungeons.

Each dungeon presents a different design and logic theme, such as mazes with false exits, excess doors with limited keys, or patterned layouts like "Jagged Edge" and "The Menagerie".

The hero is highly manoeuvrable - the player can jump higher by holding up on the joystick for longer, and can steer left or right while mid-jump. A distinctive mechanic allows the player to activate an alter ego: an invincible form that can fly and destroy enemies on contact for ten seconds once per life. This is triggered with the Spacebar or Start button when the player's character is in its blue form.

Twilight World supports two difficulty levels. On higher difficulty, players must collect all gems to unlock exits, increasing both challenge and exploration depth.

== Reception ==
In the German magazine Aktueller Software Markt (December 1987), the reviewer praised the game's graphics as "very well done for a ten-mark title" and deeming the game "very playable" overall. Robert Swan in Atari User (February 1988), writing in his review column, called Twilight World "a nice jump-shoot-collect game: A sort of Ollie's Follies in Hell", praising its "very good" graphics (9/10) and solid playability (8/10).
