= North Atlantic Convoy Raider =

1980 video game

- Publisher: Microcomputer Games
- Programmer: Gary Bedrosian (Atari)
- Platforms: TRS-80, PET, Apple II, Atari 8-bit
- Release: 1980: TRS-80, PET, Apple; 1981: Atari
- Genre: Wargame

North Atlantic Convoy Raider is a wargame published by Microcomputer Games for TRS-80, Commodore PET, and Apple II in 1980. A version for Atari 8-bit computers was released in 1981.

== Contents ==
North Atlantic Convoy Raider is a game where the player controls the Bismarck on its military maneuvers against British convoys and warships in the North Atlantic.

== Reception ==
David Boyle reviewed North Atlantic Convoy Raider in The Space Gamer No. 35. Boyle commented that "The game overall is worthwhile for anyone who enjoys putting his wits against the computer, and doesn't mind a little luck playing a part."
