= Panzer-Jagd =

1983 video game

- Publisher(s): Avalon Hill
- Designer(s): Richard W. Scorupski
- Platform(s): Atari 8-bit, Commodore 64
- Release: 1983
- Genre(s): Computer wargame Turn-based strategy

Panzer-Jagd is computer wargame published in 1983 by The Avalon Hill Game Company for the Atari 8-bit computers and Commodore 64.

== Gameplay ==
Panzer-Jagd is a game in which the player controls the German commander against the computer controlling the Russian leader, in 1943 during World War II in a game of tactical combat.

== Reception ==
Jeff Seiken reviewed the game for Computer Gaming World, and stated that "As the game stands now, Panzer-Jagd simulates tactical combat about as well as Electronic Battleship portrays naval warfare. Gamers interested in tactical warfare would be better advised to spend an additional $10 or AH's TAC for SSI's Combat Leader."
