= Shiloh: Grant's Trial in the West =

1987 video game

- Publisher: Strategic Simulations
- Platforms: Apple II, Atari 8-bit, Commodore 64, MS-DOS
- Release: 1987

Shiloh: Grant's Trial in the West is a 1987 video game published by Strategic Simulations.

== Gameplay ==
Shiloh: Grant's Trial in the West is a game in which the Battle of Shiloh is covered using turns that last for an hour-and-a-half.

== Reception ==
Jay C. Selover reviewed the game for Computer Gaming World, and stated that "Shiloh locks up SSI's position as the producer of the finest operational level American Civil War system to date."
