= Tycoon: The Commodity Market Simulation =

1983 video game

- Developer: Blue Chip Software
- Publisher: Blue Chip Software
- Platforms: Apple II, Atari 8-bit, Commodore 64, MS-DOS, Classic Mac OS
- Release: 1983
- Genre: Business simulation

Tycoon: The Commodity Market Simulation is a 1983 video game published by Blue Chip Software.

== Gameplay ==
Tycoon is a game in which the commodities market is simulated.

== Reception ==
Johnny Wilson reviewed the game for Computer Gaming World, and stated that "Tycoon is a superior cousin to the Millionaire stock market simulation from Blue Chip Software [...] The program is both similar and improved."
