= Golf Challenge (video game) =

1982 sports video game

- Developer: Harold Schwab
- Publisher: Sierra On-Line
- Platform: Atari 8-bit
- Release: 1982
- Genre: Sports

Golf Challenge is a sports video game written by Harold Schwab for Atari 8-bit computers and published by Sierra On-Line in 1982.

== Gameplay ==
Golf Challenge is a game which golf is played using a joystick.

== Reception ==
Stanley Greenlaw reviewed the game for Computer Gaming World, and stated that "The graphics of GC are the best of the games reviewed here. While less a serious simulation [...] GC has a charm all it's [sic] own as a video-style golf game."
