= Close Assault =

1982 video game

- Publisher(s): Avalon Hill
- Platform(s): Apple II, Atari 8-bit, TRS-80
- Release: 1982
- Genre(s): Wargame

Close Assault is a computer wargame published in 1982 by Avalon Hill.

== Gameplay ==
Close Assault is a game in which the player is the top-ranked officer commanding World War II squads in tactical infantry combat.

== Reception ==
Bob Proctor reviewed the game for Computer Gaming World, and stated that "I can't say that Close Assault is Avalon Hill's best computer wargame, but it IS their best for the Apple and TRS-80. I recommend it strongly to anyone who is looking for a first computer wargame."
