= Clash of Wills =

1985 video game

- Developer: Digital Kamp Group
- Publisher: Digital Kamp Group
- Platforms: Atari 8-bit, Commodore 64
- Release: 1985

Clash of Wills is a computer wargame published in 1985 by Digital Kamp Group for the Atari 8-bit computers and Commodore 64.

== Gameplay ==
Clash of Wills is a game in which the Eastern Front and Western Front of Europe during World War II (1940-1945) is simulated.

== Reception ==
M. Evan Brooks reviewed the game for Computer Gaming World, and stated that "This reviewer has mixed feelings about the product. The scope of the simulation is laudable; its execution is not. Its failures could well have been corrected with some additional development. The designers did not choose to do so, and the net result is a game with a potential for greatness, but a realization of minimal adequacy, at best."
