= The Institute (video game) =

1983 video game

- Developer(s): Jyym Pearson; Robyn Pearson
- Publisher(s): Screenplay
- Platform(s): Atari 8-bit, Apple II, Commodore 64, TRS-80
- Release: 1983
- Genre(s): Interactive fiction (original); Graphic adventure

The Institute is a graphic adventure game published in 1983 by Screenplay for the TRS-80, Apple II, Commodore 64, and Atari 8-bit computers.

== Gameplay ==
The user navigates their character through a graph of rooms by entering commands with the keyboard: "N", "W", "S", and "E" are used to move respectively north, west, south, and east; simple text commands to interact and investigate objects within the rooms such as "open door" are also used.

The game's protagonist is a mental patient trying to escape from the institute (hence the title). A good deal of the game takes place in drug-induced hallucinations, though in some versions the drug is a "strange powder" that sends you into "dreams".
