= Seafox (video game) =

1982 video game

- Publisher: Broderbund
- Designer: Ed Hobbs
- Platforms: Apple II, Atari 8-bit, Commodore 64, VIC-20
- Release: 1982
- Genre: Shoot_'em_up
- Mode: Single-player

Seafox is a shoot 'em up written by Ed Hobbs and published by Broderbund in 1982 for the Apple II and as a cartridge for Atari 8-bit computers. A VIC-20 port, also on cartridge, was released in 1983.

== Gameplay ==
In-game screenshot (Atari 8-bit)

Seafox is a game in which the player uses a submarine to destroy enemy ships. The submarine is fully maneuverable beneath the surface by joystick control. Torpedoes can be fired upward at ships on the surface, or at enemy submarines. Red Cross hospital ships must be avoided.

The player's submarine has a limited fuel and torpedoes supply, so both must be frequently replenished. This is achieved with the help of a supply sub and a friendly dolphin. The player must intercept the package before giant clams steal it or enemy submarines destroy it. If the player shoots the dolphin, an indestructible orange shark appears and destroys the player's sub.

Only three submarines are allowed each game, with each one starting out with a full load of fuel and torpedoes.

== Reception ==
In a review for Electronic Games, Steve Davidson ended with: "Sea Fox [sic] will never be confused with a realistic military simulation, but it offers oceans of fun for target game fans". Luther Shaw reviewed the game for Computer Gaming World writing that "the graphics are nice but there are better games in the Broderbund line". InfoWorld's Essential Guide to Atari Computers cited it as "engaging".

A January 1983 Creative Computing review concluded:

On the lower levels, I found Seafox considerably easier to play and much less frustrating than several of the other submarine games on the market. Although the hazards increase on the upper levels, I generally had a nice sense of accomplishment as I progressed through the game. My applause goes to Ed Hobbs for creating a game which can be enjoyed by clods and experts alike.
