= Empire of the Over-Mind =

1981 video game

Empire of the Overmind
- Publisher: Avalon Hill
- Designer: Gary Bedrosian
- Platforms: Apple II, Atari 8-bit, MS-DOS, TRS-80
- Release: 1981: Apple, TRS-80; 1982: Atari; 1986: MS-DOS
- Genre: Interactive fiction

Empire of the Over-Mind (sometimes Empire of the Overmind) is an interactive fiction game written by Gary Bedrosian and published by Avalon Hill for the Apple II, Atari 8-bit computers, and TRS-80 in 1981. A version with an enhanced display for IBM PC compatibles by Bedrosian was published in 1986.

== Contents ==
Empire of the Over-Mind is a text only adventure game in which the player must free a magical kingdom from the control of the evil computer Over-Mind. The game is accompanied by a poem, "The Rhyme of the Over-Mind," which provides necessary clues for the gameplay.

== Reception ==
In a 1984 COMPUTE! piece on adventure games, Selby Bateman wrote: "One very popular game for Avalon Hill has been its all-text adventure, Empire of the OverMind [sic] for Apple II and Atari computers, which is still selling well, notes Jack Dodd, Avalon Hill's director of marketing."

The price of the game was a point of contention. Anthony Hughes wrote for Page 6 that it was "twice the price of the U.K. produced Adventures but still represents very good value." Bill Seligman's review in The Space Gamer No. 49 concluded that "For the price of this primitive program, one could buy two-and-a-half Scott Adams all-text adventures or one full-color graphics adventure from On-Line. Not recommended."

Another criticism of the game was its lengthy load and processing times.
