= Time Traveler (1980 video game) =

1980 text adventure game

- Apple II title screen
- Developer: Krell Software
- Platforms: Apple II, Atari 8-bit, TRS-80, PET
- Release: 1980

Time Traveler is a 1980 fantasy text adventure developed by Krell Software. The game was released on the 16K, Level II TRS-80, Apple II, Commodore PET, and Atari 8-bit computers

== Gameplay ==
Time Traveler is a text-based fantasy game in which the player travels through fourteen historical eras to collect magical rings, each possessing a unique ability. The objective is to retrieve all fourteen rings and return them to the time machine laboratory. Each historical period contains a grid of locations that players explore by entering commands. Upon arriving in a new era, players must choose between two opposing factions, influencing their interactions with local inhabitants and authorities.

Players can recruit allies, engage in combat, bribe guards, and search for weapons, treasure and hidden rings. Random encounters introduce additional challenges, including imprisonment and confrontations with local authorities. The game's randomised events allow encounters to vary between playthroughs.

== Development and release ==
Time Traveler was developed and published by Krell Software, based in Stony Brook, New York. The game was available for the Apple II, Commodore PET and TRS-80 computers, with the cassette version retailing for $24.95.

In 1981, Krell released an expanded version titled Odyssey in Time. It introduced ten additional historical eras, increasing the total to twenty-four, and added a new adversary and the ability to save and restore progress. The expanded game required 32 KB of memory and was sold for $39.95.

== Reception ==
The game was reviewed in The Dragon #44 by Mark Herro. Herro said that his opinion of the game kept changing as he played it; he intended to evaluate the game negatively at first, but the more he played the more he found himself liking it despite its problems. As he was playing an early pre-production advance copy, he found a number of little bugs in the program. Krell Software told him they had taken care of the problems in later versions.

Jon Mishcon reviewed Time Traveler in The Space Gamer No. 39. Mishcon commented that "Overall I'd say this game has some great ideals but fails to give the player enough information so that you can just sit down and enjoy playing. Those who delight in delving into a long game may find this enjoyable. I'd recommend you wait for their next game."

David Lubar reviewed Time Traveler in the June 1981 issue of Creative Computing, praising its unusual historical premise and randomly generated encounters, which encouraged replayability. Although he noted that the BASIC program was occasionally slow to respond and warned that repeated playthroughs could eventually become repetitive, he considered the game an enjoyable departure from conventional fantasy adventures.

Terry Romine reviewed the game for Computer Gaming World, and stated that "I fear that, after a person develops a strategy, the game will quickly become a series of stale replays. There are no differences between eras other than the name of the era and its political factions."
