= Dnieper River Line =

1982 video game

- Publisher: Avalon Hill
- Platforms: Apple II, Atari 8-bit, PET, MS-DOS
- Release: 1982
- Genre: Wargame

Dnieper River Line is a computer wargame published in 1982 by Avalon Hill.

== Gameplay ==
Dnieper River Line is a game in which the German defensive line of the Battle of the Dnieper is simulated.

== Reception ==
Richard Charles Karr reviewed the game for Computer Gaming World, and stated that "Dnieper River Line incorporates the elements of historical accuracy, as well as fast-paced situation-in-doubt play to produce a well developed game which computer wargamers should "check out"."
