= Rails West! =

1984 video game

- Publisher(s): Strategic Simulations
- Platform(s): Apple II, Atari 8-bit, Commodore 64
- Release: 1984
- Genre(s): Business simulation

Rails West! is a business simulation game published by Strategic Simulations in 1984.

== Gameplay ==
Rails West! is a game in which railroads from the years of 1870 to 1900 are the focus of an economic simulation.

== Reception ==
Bob Proctor reviewed the game for Computer Gaming World, and stated that "Rails West has the high-quality components one expects from SSI. It is lots of fun when all of the players are humans, even if they're inexperienced. It would make an excellent classroom exercise in the hands of a competent teacher."

The game sold 7,000 copies.
