= Universal Hero =

1986 video game

- Developer: Mastertronic
- Publisher: Mastertronic
- Designer: Stuart Middleton
- Platforms: ZX Spectrum, Atari 8-bit
- Release: 1986: Spectrum; 1987: Atari 8-bit
- Genre: Action-adventure
- Mode: Single-player

Universal Hero is an action-adventure game released by Mastertronic in 1986 for the ZX Spectrum and in 1987 for the Atari 8-bit computers. The Spectrum version was developed by Stuart Middleton working under the name of Xcel Software. The Atari 8-bit port was commissioned by Mastertronic from a third-party developer.

== Gameplay ==
Found an ID card

Taking the part of Burt, the "Universal Hero", the player must repair a space shuttle in order to make their way to a planet where they can pick up the spare parts needed to mend a space freighter which is out of control and on-course to destroy both Burt and his chances of returning to Earth. The player explores a flip-screen environment, avoiding enemies and solving simple puzzles by finding objects that need to be used in the correct locations to proceed.

A bug in the Atari 8-bit version password screen makes the game impossible to complete.

== Reception ==
Reception

Review scores
Publication	Score
Computer+Video Games	7/10
Sinclair User	5/5

A reviewer for Computer+Video Games wrote, in October 1987, "Arcade adventures must be the second most popular type of game, after shoot'em ups, and this budget title offers most of the features you could wish for, including odd objects to collect and strength sapping aliens to avoid."

Sinclair User commented, "It's getting very difficult to find exciting ways of describing games which essentially repeat the same formula over and over again," but also "Hero is considerably better than most of the competition."
