= Stealth (1984 video game) =

1984 video game

- Publisher: Broderbund
- Designers: Tracy Lagrone; Richard Sansom
- Platforms: Atari 8-bit, Commodore 64
- Release: 1984
- Genre: Rail shooter

Stealth is a pseudo-3D rail shooter designed by Tracy Lagrone and Richard Sansom. The game was published in 1984 by Broderbund for the Atari 8-bit computers and Commodore 64.

== Gameplay ==
Atari 8-bit screenshot

The player's mission in Stealth is to pilot a low-level bomber-fighter ship to infiltrate enemy territory and travel a distance of 10,000 miles to reach and destroy the Black Tower (enemy citadel). The ship uses pulse energy for power, so the player must keep an eye on the fuel supply in addition to avoiding obstacles and shooting enemies. Energy fields are randomly scattered around the planet. The yellow ones contain fields of positive energy that can be used to refuel the player's ship. On the other hand, there are also red, negative energy fields that will drain the ship of energy. On the way to the Black Tower, the player has to watch out for enemy bunkers, tanks, rockets, reconnaissance planes and fighters. Additionally, the player must destroy the radar towers, because a failed attempt to destroy them automatically triggers the launch of a homing missile.

The game has five levels, and each successive level is much more difficult.

== Development ==
An early version of the game was called Landscape. Stealth uses excerpts of Johann Sebastian Bach's Harpsichord Concerto in D minor as its title music.

== Reception ==
The game has been met with positive-to-mixed reviews. Writing for Commodore Power/Play, Tom Benford praised the game: "Stealth is software par excellence. Everything, and I mean everything, about the game is positively top-notch: sound, color, graphics, breathtaking animation, play action, challenge level, continued interest—I'd really have to give it a "10" in all of these categories." Antic's Jack Powell called the game "a welcome fix for the shoot-'em'down arcade freaks who have been wondering where the next serious laser-zap would come from," praising its graphics for "creat[ing] an excellent sense of place and dimension." Gregg Keizer of Compute!'s Gazette called it graphically "outstanding," stating: "It has one of the best 3-D views we've seen." They furthermore described the gameplay as "addicting", stating that "it's hard to tear yourself away from the screen" and calling it "one of the best [shoot-'em-up-arcade games] around."

Steve Panak was less positive in his review for ANALOG Computing and stated: "It is a shame that a game with such nice graphics denies you equally fine playability. Stealth is fascinating the first time around, but you'll tire of it quickly." Likewise, Zzap!64 gave the game an overall score of 56%, largely praising the graphics but criticizing the sound and lastability.
