= Conflict 2500 =

1981 video game

- Publisher: Avalon Hill
- Designer: William David Volk
- Platforms: Apple II, Atari 8-bit, Commodore PET, TRS-80
- Release: 1981

Conflict 2500 is video game published by Avalon Hill in 1981 for the Apple II, Atari 8-bit computers, Commodore PET, and TRS-80.

== Gameplay ==
Conflict 2500 is a game in which the player must use a band of warships to seek and destroy invading berserkers moving invisibly.

== Development ==
The game was designed by William David Volk. Volk says that at the time he was a fan of the animated series Star Blazers and borrowed themes from the show for Conflict 2500. Volk also explained that he had played the Startrek game and wanted a more complex version of that game.

== Reception ==
Jon Mishcon reviewed Conflict 2500 in The Space Gamer No. 45. Mishcon commented that "Not great, but easily worth [the price]."
