= Space Cowboy (video game) =

1983 video game

- Publisher: Avalon Hill
- Platform: Atari 8-bit
- Release: 1983

Space Cowboy is a video game written by Scott Lamb for Atari 8-bit computers and published by Avalon Hill Microcomputer Games in 1983.

== Gameplay ==
Space Cowboy is a game in which the Space Cowboy maneuvers along a walkway shown in three-quarter perspective, avoiding blasts from wall-mounted lasers.

== Reception ==
Bill Wallace reviewed Space Cowboy in Space Gamer No. 70. Wallace commented that "The action is idiotic, wooden, boring after only a couple of minutes of play. If you'd never seen Zaxxon the three-quarter perspective would be interesting, though it doesn't really contribute to play."
