= Twerps (video game) =

1982 video game

- Developer: Sirius Software
- Publisher: Sirius Software
- Designer: Dan Thompson
- Programmers: Apple II; Dan Thompson; Atari 8-bit Joe Kelly
- Platforms: Apple II, Atari 8-bit
- Release: 1982
- Genre: Shoot 'em up

Twerps is a shoot 'em up written by Dan Thompson for the Apple II and published by Sirius Software in 1982. It was ported to the Atari 8-bit computers by Joe Kelly.

== Gameplay ==
Twerps is a game in which an explorer ship with its crew of nine Twerps crashed on an asteroid, and Captain Twerp must rescue the stranded Twerps.

== Reception ==
Mark Bausman reviewed the game for Computer Gaming World, and stated that "This game will provide a pleasant diversion for children and adults alike."
