= Canyon Climber =

1982 video game

- Publishers: Tandy (CoCo); Datasoft; NEC (PC-6001)
- Designers: Steve Bjork; James Garon
- Programmers: Color Computer; Steve Bjork; James Garon; Atari 8-bit Tim Ferris; Apple II; Brian Mountford
- Platforms: Apple II, Atari 8-bit, TRS-80 Color Computer, PC-6001
- Release: 1982
- Genre: Platform
- Mode: Single-player

Canyon Climber is a fixed-screen platform game designed by Steve Bjork and James Garon for the TRS-80 Color Computer and published by Tandy Corporation in 1982. Ports to the Atari 8-bit computers by Tim Ferris and Apple II by Brian Mountford were published by Datasoft. NEC released a version for the PC-6001. The three levels in Canyon Climber have American Southwest themes; two are direct analogs of levels in Donkey Kong. The Datasoft box art is by Scott Ross.

== Gameplay ==
The third screen with brick-dropping birds flying over the canyon (Atari 8-bit).

Canyon Climber consists of three non-scrolling screens that are endlessly cycled through. In the first, similar to the rivet screen from Donkey Kong, the goal is to place explosive charges on both ends of each of four bridges, using ladders to climb between them, then trigger a detonator. Goats pursue the player and can be jumped over. The second screen resembles Donkey Kong's opening level, with angled platforms and connecting ladders. Native Americans ("Indians" in the manual) on each platform shoot arrows which can be jumped or avoided. The goal is to reach the top. The objective of the third screen is to climb to the top while avoiding bricks dropped by birds.

The soundtrack of the first screen is a musical adaptation of the Prelude section from Prelude and Fugue in C minor, BWV 847.

== Reception ==
The 1983 book The Creative Atari stated, "Canyon Climber achieves a cartoon-like atmosphere in the rendering of its various screens, to very pleasing effect," concluding "You will spend a while with Canyon Climber." In a review of four Atari 8-bit Datasoft games (alongside Pacific Coast Highway, Clowns and Balloons, and Shooting Arcade), Charles Brannon of COMPUTE! wrote, "the overall animation and execution are perhaps the best of the four." ANALOG Computing wrote, "The details and playability of the game are very good" and rated the graphics a 10 out of 10.

Electronic Fun with Computers & Games described Canyon Climber as "not quite as demanding as Donkey Kong, but the concept is appealingly bizarre," and called the game "short-term addictive." Reviewing the TRS-80 Color Computer version for Creative Computing, Stephen B. Gray had a different view of the difficulty: "Canyon Climber is a game for the expert or the masochist."

Long after the game's initial release, Keita Iida noted the low difficulty level, calling the game "perfectly suited for beginning players who are just getting into platform/climbing games." Mark Sabbatini, looking at the Color Computer version, agrees: "as soon as you've completed the levels a few times the challenge is pretty much gone." He also disliked the randomness of the rocks and goats, stating "all too often whether you live or die is all about luck and not about skill and planning."

== Legacy ==
One section of Llamasoft's 2011 GoatUp game for iOS is an homage to Canyon Climber.
