= Nuclear Nick =

1986 video game

- Developer: Ron Rosen
- Publisher: Americana
- Platform: Atari 8-bit
- Release: 1986
- Genre: Platform

Nuclear Nick is a platform game created for Atari 8-bit computers by Ron Rosen. It was released in 1986 by UK publisher Americana. The player controls the titular character, Nick, through a series of single-screen levels filled with obstacles and enemies, aiming to safely collect all nuclear waste.

== Gameplay ==
The player is about to collect a power-up.

The player assumes the role of Nick, tasked with cleaning up nuclear waste inside a reactor. The game is set across multiple levels filled with platforms, ladders, and elevators. The main objective is to collect all nuclear waste containers while avoiding killer robots and lightning bolts. Each level presents different obstacles like laser walls, moving platforms, and patrolling robots. Power-ups temporarily enable the player to destroy killer robots and earn points, while additional points are gained by collecting nuclear waste. The player has five lives to navigate through 20 increasingly challenging levels.

== Reception ==
Bob Chappell, writing for Atari User magazine, praised the game for its crisp graphics and appropriate sound effects, despite lacking music. Reviewer noted the unique and humorous plot, where Nick consumes "radioactive hamburgers" to destroy patrolling robots and collect nuclear waste for points. The game was recognized as an excellent platformer and considered a bargain at its price, earning an overall score of 9/10 points.

== See also ==
Other games by Ron Rosen:

- Pacific Coast Highway (1982)
- Mr. Robot and His Robot Factory (1983)
- Rosen's Brigade (1983)
