= Alternate Reality: The Dungeon =

1987 video game

- Commodore 64 cover art
- Developer: Paradise Programming
- Publisher: Datasoft
- Designers: Philip Price; Ken Jordan; Dan Pinal
- Composer: Gary Gilbertson
- Platforms: Atari 8-bit, Apple II, Commodore 64 / 128
- Release: 1987
- Genre: Role-playing
- Mode: Single-player

Alternate Reality: The Dungeon is a role-playing video game published by Datasoft as the second game in the Alternate Reality series. It was created by Philip Price, and was released in 1987. Price was unable to complete The Dungeon which was finished by Ken Jordan and Dan Pinal.

== Gameplay ==
The player is entering the Dungeon (Atari 8-bit screenshot)

Alternate Reality: The Dungeon closely continues its predecessor in that the player is still held captive by aliens in an alternate reality. They now enter the dungeon with the sole intention of surviving. The City was about exploring the city and gaining strength, the Dungeon has a more linear path. The player has access to stores such as inns and the smithy. Also, the player has the option of joining any of the six guilds that have made it inside the dungeon. All things now have a weight associated with them; carrying too much hinders speed and endurance, which is a significant change in the gameplay.

The Dungeon, if loaded with an unauthorized copy, featured two "FBI agents" as encounters during the beginning of the game, who attacked with "the long arm of the law". The two agents were overly powerful and unbeatable, so as to kill the character before being able to play the game. Due to a bug, the other way to run into these characters was to try to transfer over a character from the city. In effect, it was impossible to actually transfer a character over from the city to the dungeon without mailing in the disks to be exchanged for a fixed version.

== Reception ==
Alternate Reality: The City and Alternate Reality: The Dungeon were both the subject of the feature review Dragon #135. The reviewers gave Alternate Reality: The City 3 stars, and Alternate Reality: The Dungeon 2 1/2 stars.

Computer Gaming World in 1987 said that The Dungeon's design and mechanics were superior to The City. The magazine's Scorpia's review of The Dungeon described the game as "a big improvement over City, but it is still ultimately unsatisfying". While the graphics were much-improved, especially on 8-bit versions, the game lacked any sense of accomplishment. She found that starting characters from scratch is nearly impossible, and several aspects of the game arbitrarily punished the players, such as the unbeatable Devourer which eats items if the player has too many, and the reduction of stats when playing from a backed-up save. In 1993, Scorpia called The Dungeon "better than the first, but not by much".
