= Zorro (1985 video game) =

- Commodore 64 cover
- Developer: Datasoft
- Publisher: U.S. Gold
- Designer: James Garon
- Artist: Kelly Day
- Platforms: Amstrad CPC, Apple II, Atari 8-bit, Commodore 64, ZX Spectrum
- Release: 1985: Atari, Apple, CPC, C64; 1986: Spectrum
- Genre: Puzzle-platform
- Mode: Single-player

Zorro is a puzzle-platform game written by James Garon and published by Datasoft in 1985. Versions were released for the Apple II, Atari 8-bit computers, Commodore 64, and Amstrad CPC. A ZX Spectrum port was published in 1986 by U.S. Gold.

== Gameplay ==
Gameplay screenshot (Atari 8-bit)

The player's task is, as the title character, to get to the heavily guarded fort and free his beloved from the clutches of the evil Sergeant Garcia. The gameplay is very similar to that of another Datasoft platformer - Bruce Lee. However, Zorro has a slower pace and more puzzles. These mainly involve collecting items from a specific room in the city, then carrying them and using them in the appropriate place (such as heating up a branding iron in a fireplace and using it on a bull). The game features 20 different locations, including catacombs under the city, an underground lake, and The Ole Hotel.

== Reception ==
Reception

Review score
Publication	Score
Zzap!	78%

Zorro received mixed reviews. In 1986, Julian Rignall wrote in Zzap!, "If you like this sort of game then you could well be pleased with this, but if you like your action a little faster and hotter then you might find yourself bored playing Zorro." The game was also reviewed in Computer and Video Games: "Graphically this rather standard platform game is not over impressive."
