= Clowns and Balloons =

1982 video game

- Publisher: Datasoft
- Designers: Atari 8-bit Frank Cohen; TRS-80 Color Computer; Steve Bjork
- Platforms: Atari 8-bit, TRS-80 Color Computer
- Release: 1982
- Genre: Action

Clowns and Balloons is a circus-themed video game written by Frank Cohen for Atari 8-bit computers and published in 1982 by Datasoft. The game was also released for the TRS-80 Color Computer, written by Steve Bjork who had released a similar game called Space Ball for the TRS-80 in 1980. Clowns and Balloons is a clone of the 1977 arcade game Circus. A variant of Breakout, the player moves a trampoline left and right to catch a bouncing clown who pops rows of balloons at the top of the screen with his head.

== Gameplay ==
A clown in mid-air about to pop a balloon

The object of Clowns and Balloons is to move a trampoline under a clown and bounce it high enough into the air to burst the balloons at the top of the screen. The player moves the trampoline horizontally with the joystick or paddles. There are three levels of difficulty.

There is a bonus for clearing each row of balloons completely starting from the bottom and working up. If the balloons are not cleared in order, the row refills. The clown bounces at different angles depending on where they land on the trampoline.

== Reception ==
Charles Brannon, who reviewed the game for Compute! magazine, liked the game: "The animation remains fairly simple, though smooth. The sound and music are some of the best I've heard. Despite the simple theme, Clowns and Balloons turned out to be great fun, and inspired hours of frenzied joystick twisting." Page 6 admired the graphics and sound, calling them an impressive demonstration of the Atari's capabilities. However, they stated: "Playing required a lot of perseverance to get used to the speed of movement of the joystick. In fact I was beginning to get bored before I got good enough to burst the first set of balloons [...]". David Plotkin of SoftSide remarked that the game is easy to play but "requires quick reflexes and considerable skill" to master and recommended the paddle rather than the joystick. Plotkin echoed Page 6's sentiment regarding the presentation, stating: "The programmers at DataSoft understand the Atari's features very well." John Anderson in the book The Creative Atari praised the game, writing that fans of Circus would "especially appreciate the sophistication of Clowns and Balloons" and saying it "may well be the most addictive game I have seen since Threshold."

== See also ==
Other games written by Frank Cohen:

- Cohen's Towers (1983)
- Ghost Chaser (1984)
- Ollie's Follies (1984)
- The Scrolls of Abadon (1984)

Other games written by Steve Bjork:

- Space Ball (1980)
- Canyon Climber (1982)
- Mega-Bug (1982)
- The Sands of Egypt (1982)
- Pitfall II: Lost Caverns (1984)
- Super Pitfall (1986)
