= The Goonies (Datasoft video game) =

- Publishers: American Action (Europe); Datasoft (US); ERBE Software (Spain); U.S. Gold (Europe)
- Programmer: Scott Spanburg
- Artist: Kelly Day
- Platforms: Amstrad CPC, Apple II, Atari 8-bit, Commodore 64, ZX Spectrum
- Release: 1985
- Genre: Puzzle-platform

The Goonies is a puzzle-platform game programmed by Scott Spanburg and published in 1985 by Datasoft. It is based on the 1985 Richard Donner film The Goonies.

== Gameplay ==
Atari 8-bit gameplay

The game has eight stages, each based on a scene from the film. In each stage, the two Goonies must work together to solve puzzles and reach the exit to move on to the next stage. In single-player mode the joystick button can be used to switch between the two characters, and in the two player mode, each player controls one Goonie.

== Reception ==
The game received positive reviews. Computer and Video Games reviewer said that "each screen is packed with interesting puzzles and problems", and considered the game to be fun to play. Computer Gamer magazine called it one of the best games of platform genre.
