= Mancopter =

1984 video game

- Developer: Nichibutsu USA
- Publisher: Datasoft
- Programmer: Scott Spanburg
- Artist: Kelly Day
- Platform: Commodore 64
- Release: 1984
- Genre: Racing
- Mode: Single-player

Mancopter is a video game developed by Nichibutsu USA and published by Datasoft for the Commodore 64 in 1984. It was programmed by Scott Spanburg, and the music was composed by John A. Fitzpatrick. The player controls a person piloting a helicopter-like flying device over an ocean competing with computer-controlled pilots.

== Gameplay ==
The player flies the copter by rapidly pressing the fire button on the joystick. If the player stops pressing the button, or runs into some sort of obstacle, then the copter falls into the sea. For a few of these falls, the player is saved by a whale who surfaces with the copter on its head and allows the player to continue the game. If the player runs out of "Fish," (which can be stolen or recaptured from flying pelicans,) then a Jaws-inspired shark eats the player instead and the game is over.

== Reception ==
Compute!'s Gazette called Mancopter "challenging enough for adults and picturesque enough for children ... The game is challenging and graphically entertaining".
