= PC-6600 series =

Personal computers series by NEC

NEC PC-6601
- Manufacturer: NEC
- Type: Personal Computer
- Released: November 21st, 1983; 42 years ago
- Introductory price: ¥143,000
- Media: 143KB 3 1/2-inch floppy disks
- CPU: Zilog Z80A compatible μPD780C-1 clocked at 4MHz, μPD8049 co-processor clocked at 8MHz
- Memory: 64KB RAM + 1KB floppy disk interface, 50KB VRAM, 32KB (Basic + machine language monitor) + 32KB(chinese characters) + 16KB (voice data) + 16KB ROM
- Display: 80×40 (15 colors), 160×200 (15 colors), 320×200 (4 colors)
- Sound: 3 voices, 8 octaves (AY-3-8910), optional speech synthesizer
- Input: Keyboard, Graphics tablet
- Dimensions: 365 × 380 × 113 mm (14.4 × 15 × 4.4 inches)
- Weight: 4.5 kg (9.9 lbs)
- Predecessor: NEC PC-6001

The NEC PC-6600 Series were a lineup of personal computers produced by the NEC Corporation on November 21, 1983. They were essentially a PC-6001 MK2 with a built-in 3.5" floppy disk drive. Two models in this series were produced: the PC-6601 and the PC-6601 SR.

== History ==
The PC-6601 was released on November 21, 1983 with the retail price of 143,000 yen (US$886.46). All of the features from the PC-6001 MK2 are on the PC-6601, but it adds a single-sided 3.5 inch FDD that was built-in to the machine, with one additional FDD available as an option. A new function has also been added to the PC-6001 MK2’s speech synthesis that allows for two-octave pitch for singing.

There was a good amount of bundled software which includes a Japanese Word Processor, a song writer, and an adventure game called Colony Odyssey.

There’s a switch on the back of the PC-6601 to disconnect the built-in FDD, this is useful for some PC-6001 MK2 software that won’t work unless the FDD is disconnected from the computer.

A Extended Kanji ROM cartridge was available as an option, it was meant to expand the Kanji ROM font from 1024 characters to full JIS Level 1.

Like the PC-6001 MK2, the image character is Takeda Tetsuya.

In 1984, NEC released the PC-6601 SR, a higher end version of the PC-6001 MK2 SR. The price for this computer was at 155,000 yen (US$960.85).

The PC-6601 SR adds all the features that were added from the PC-6001 MK2 SR, like the YM2203 FM synthesis sound chip.
