= Ghost Chaser =

1984 video game

- Developer: Fanda
- Publishers: Artworx (US); U.S. Gold (EU)
- Designer: Frank Cohen
- Platforms: Atari 8-bit, Commodore 64
- Release: 1984
- Genre: Platform
- Modes: Single-player, multiplayer

Ghost Chaser (shown on the title screen as Frank Cohen's Ghost Chaser) is a platform game designed by Frank Cohen and published in 1984 by Artworx for Atari 8-bit computers and Commodore 64. U.S. Gold published the game in Europe.

== Gameplay ==
Atari 8-bit gameplay

In Ghost Chaser the player's task is to go through all sixteen chambers of the haunted mansion in order to find the way to the treasure chamber. Some rooms are locked, so the player must find a key to them, and sometimes a key is needed to leave the room they just entered.

In this mission, the player is hindered by various ghosts, which in addition to conventional shapes can also take the form of drops, fireflies, birds or razor blades (the latter kill on the spot). Falling from a great height or through a trap door is also fatal. To avoid encounters with ghosts, the player can jump, crouch, and while on the pipe can pull up his legs.

In the game, the player will also encounter a teleport in a closet, a painting looking back at the player, or skeletons rising from their graves. In addition to the keys, there are also stones to collect, which the player can throw at the ghosts to get rid of them for a while.

== Reception ==
Ghost Chaser was met with mixed reviews. Steve Panak wrote in his column in the September 1985 issue of ANALOG Computing: "The best thing about Ghost Chaser is the plastic case containing the disk, as it will both protect the contents and look good on your shelf collecting dust." Likewise, a review in Computer Gamer called the game a "disappointment", calling the graphics "indistinct" and the colors "drab" and criticizing "poor value for money" due to the limited amount of rooms. In contrast, a Your 64 review concluded: "Graphics are dead cute (all hi-res you know) and the action is certainly hair-raising at times," and a Home Computing Weekly review called it "quite enjoyable to play" albeit too short. German magazine Happy Computer called the game "an appealingly made climbing game that will challenge friends of this genre". Zzap!64 praised the graphics and presentation, but also criticized the game's lastability, value, and sound, giving it a 63% overall.

== See also ==
Other games written by Frank Cohen:

- Clowns and Balloons (1982)
- Cohen's Towers (1983)
- Ollie's Follies (1984)
- The Scrolls of Abadon (1984)
