= TK-80 =

Single-board computer

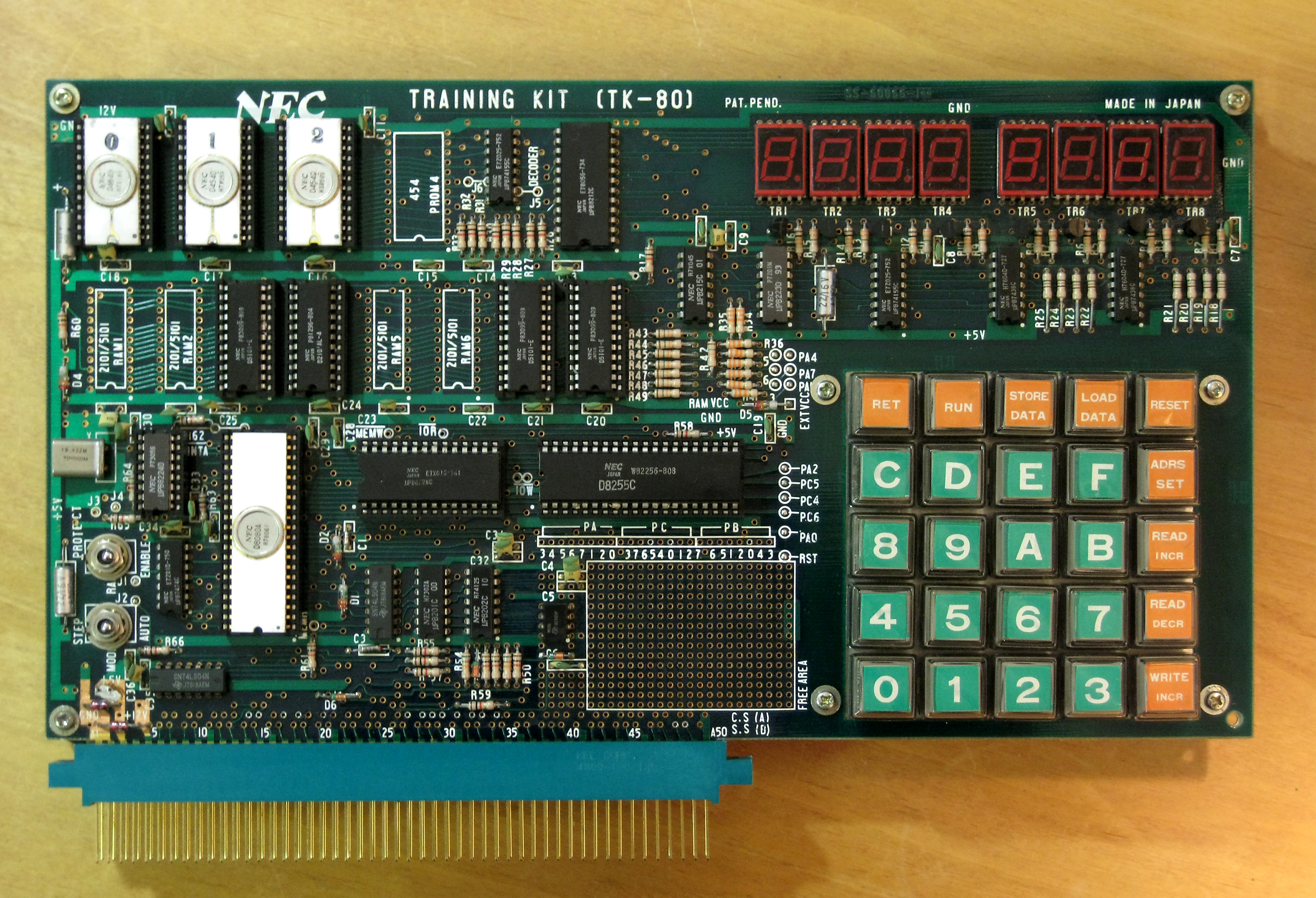
- TK-80 (assembled)
- Developer: Tomio Goto, Akira Kato
- Manufacturer: NEC
- Type: Single-board computer
- Released: August 3, 1976; 50 years ago
- Introductory price: ¥88,500 (equivalent to ¥165,162 in 2024)
- Units sold: 17,000 (As of October 1977); 26,000 (As of October 1978)
- CPU: NEC μPD8080A 2.048 MHz
- Memory: ROM 768 bytes、RAM 512 bytes
- Display: 8 hexadecimal digits; 7-segment display
- Input: 25 keys
- Connectivity: 110 bit/s Serial I/O, 3 × 8 bits Parallel I/O
- Power: DC +5V 1.0 A, +12V 0.15 A
- Dimensions: 310(W) × 180(D) mm (12.2(W) × 7.1(D) inches)
- Successor: PC-8000 series

The TK-80 (μCOM Training Kit TK-80) was an 8080-based single-board computer "training kit" developed by Nippon Electric Company (NEC) in 1976. It was originally developed for engineers who considered using the μCOM-80 family in their product. It was successful among hobbyists in late 1970s in Japan, due to its reasonable price and an expensive computer terminal not being required.

== History ==
NEC started as a telecommunications equipment vendor, and their business was heavily dependent on Nippon Telegraph and Telephone Public Corporation (NTT). To increase private demand and exports, NEC began developing new industries such as computers and semiconductors in the 1950s. Although those businesses were not profitable enough, NEC continued investing profits from successful telecommunication business.

In the 1970s, the Semiconductor Division developed several microprocessors including Intel compatible processors, and in 1976 got a second-source agreement with Intel to produce the 8080 microprocessor legally. However, the division had trouble marketing them. In Japan, few engineers were interested in microprocessors, and NEC salesmen couldn't find what kind of demand would make much profit.

In February 1976, the Semiconductor and Integrated Circuit Sales Division formed the Microcomputer Sales Section, and began to provide development environments for their microprocessors. Kazuya Watanabe (渡邊 和也), who was formerly manager of the Automation Promotion Section, became its section manager. However, they visited customers and explained, but it was difficult for them to understand how to use a microprocessor. At the same time, NEC received an order from a laboratory in the Yokosuka Communication Institute of NTT that they wanted an educational microcomputer product for their new employees. Tomio Gotō (後藤 富雄), a member of the section, proposed to Watanabe developing an educational kit. Based on this kit, the TK-80 was developed for general engineers and aimed to create a demand for microprocessors outside the industrial field.

Gotō mainly designed the TK-80, and Akira Katō (加藤 明) did the detailed design work. Gotō got an idea from a photo of the KIM-1. The KIM-1 can monitor and show the current address by the software, but the display disappears when the CPU is hanging. The TK-80 has the Dynamic Display using the 555 timer IC and interrupt the CPU, it can always show the current address. In addition, the TK-80 has a CMOS battery. He decided to document its manual with a circuit diagram and assembly code of the debug monitor, influenced by the PDP-8 which was an open architecture and was used as an IC tester at NEC.

TK-80 demonstrated controlling a model train at Bit-INN

Advert in Transistor Gijutsu Sep.1976. "The closest microcomputer with unlimited potential." The price includes shipping cost.

The TK-80 came out on August 3, 1976. It was priced at 88,500 yen, an engineer's section manager could approve at that time. NEC had opened a support center (Bit-INN) at the Akihabara Radio Kaikan on September 13, 1976. They found many machines were sold to not only electrical engineers but also businessmen, hobbyists and students. The TK-80 was sold more than 2,000 units per month, despite 200 units expected.

Soon after its success, other Japanese microprocessor manufacturers developed an evaluation kit for their microprocessor. Power supplies and other peripherals came out from third parties. Watanabe and his members wrote an introductory book Mi-com Introduction (マイコン入門) in July 1977, it became very popular and sold more than 200,000 copies. Also, some computer magazines were founded, the ASCII, the I/O, the Monthly Mi-com (月刊マイコン) and the RAM.

When Kato worked for the help desk at Bit-INN, a doctor asked him how to use the TK-80 for calculating medical costs on the point system, and a store manager asked him whether it could process sales information. He noticed users were trying to use the TK-80 as a computer rather than a training kit. However, the TK-80 lacked memory and expandability to use for practical purposes. Around the same time, a third party manufacturer suggested an expansion board to provide TV output and a BASIC interpreter. The TK-80BS was built upon that board, and was released in the end of 1977. Its BASIC was designed to fit in 4 KB of ROM, had the same as Li-Chen Wang's Tiny BASIC except some differences in functions and statements. Its functions and speed didn't satisfy users. This led to the development of a new machine which became the PC-8001.

In Japan, the Altair 8800 was sold in 1975, but not successful due to its high brokerage fee. Neither was the Apple II nor the Commodore PET. Single-board computers had been popular until the successor PC-8001 came out in 1979.

== Variants ==
- The TK-80E was a cost-reduced version priced at 67,000 yen, introduced in 1977. It contained the NEC μPD8080AF (2 MHz), fully compatible with the Intel 8080A. (The original μPD8080A has an incompatibility in the BCD adjustment, the μPD8080AF does not.). Other specifications included 768 B (Max. Up to 1 KB expandable) of ROM, and 512 B (Max. Up to 1 KB expandable) of RAM.
- The TK-80BS (BASIC Station) was an expansion kit introduced in 1977. It included a keyboard, a backplane and an expansion board for the TK-80 with 5 KB of RAM and 12 KB of ROM. It supported 8K BASIC.

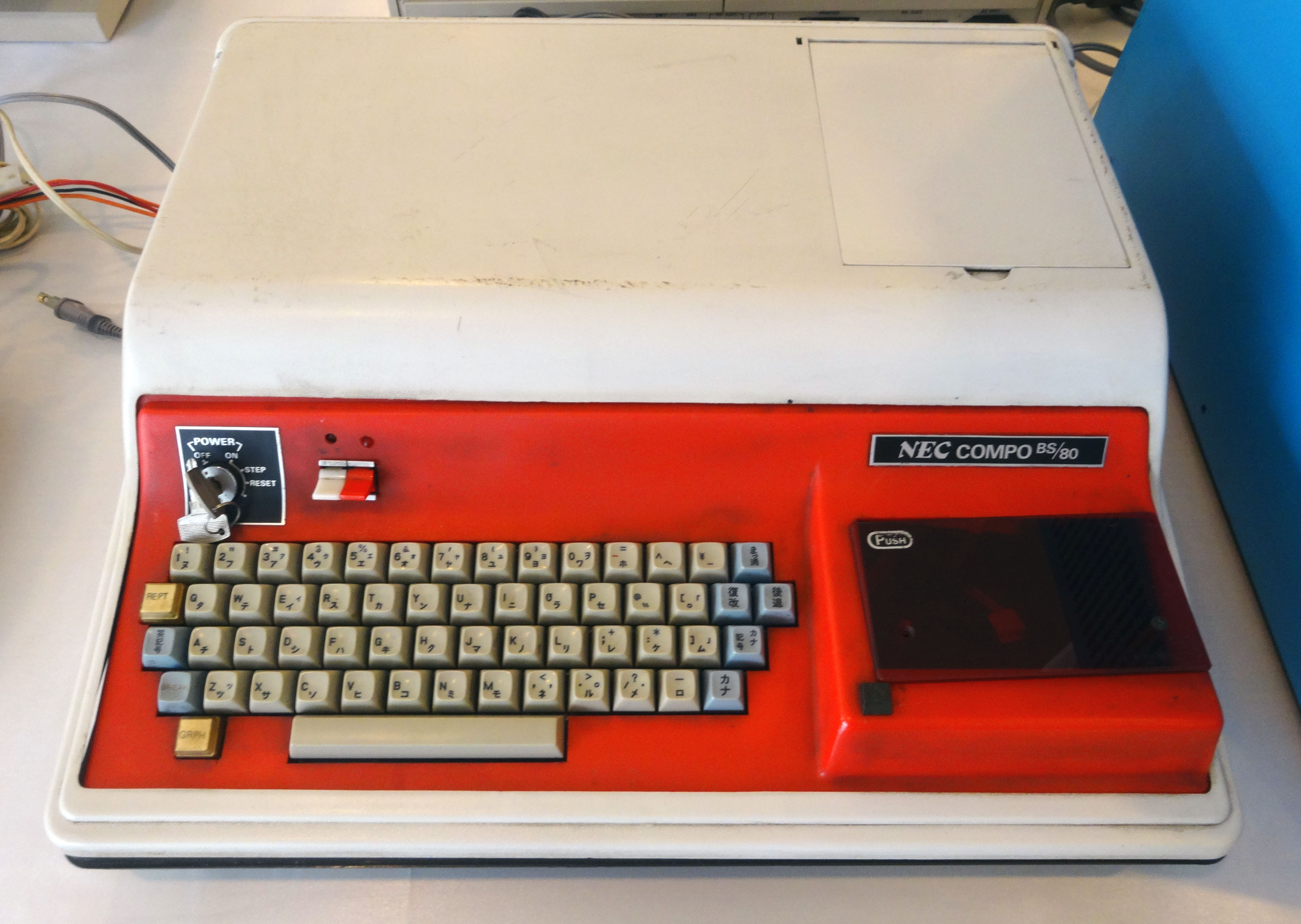
COMPO BS/80

- The COMPO BS/80 was a fully assembled and encased microcomputer system, introduced in October 1978. It consisted of the TK-80BS expansion board, a keyboard, a cassette tape (MT) data recorder, and an integrated case. Being sold as a complete, ready-to-use machine, the COMPO BS/80 is historically considered Japan's first domestically manufactured, mass-market microcomputer. The unit's slow clock speed and rudimentary built-in BASIC limited its commercial success. At the time of its release, NEC was already developing the much higher-performance PC-8001, which utilized the Z80 CPU and was released in May 1979.

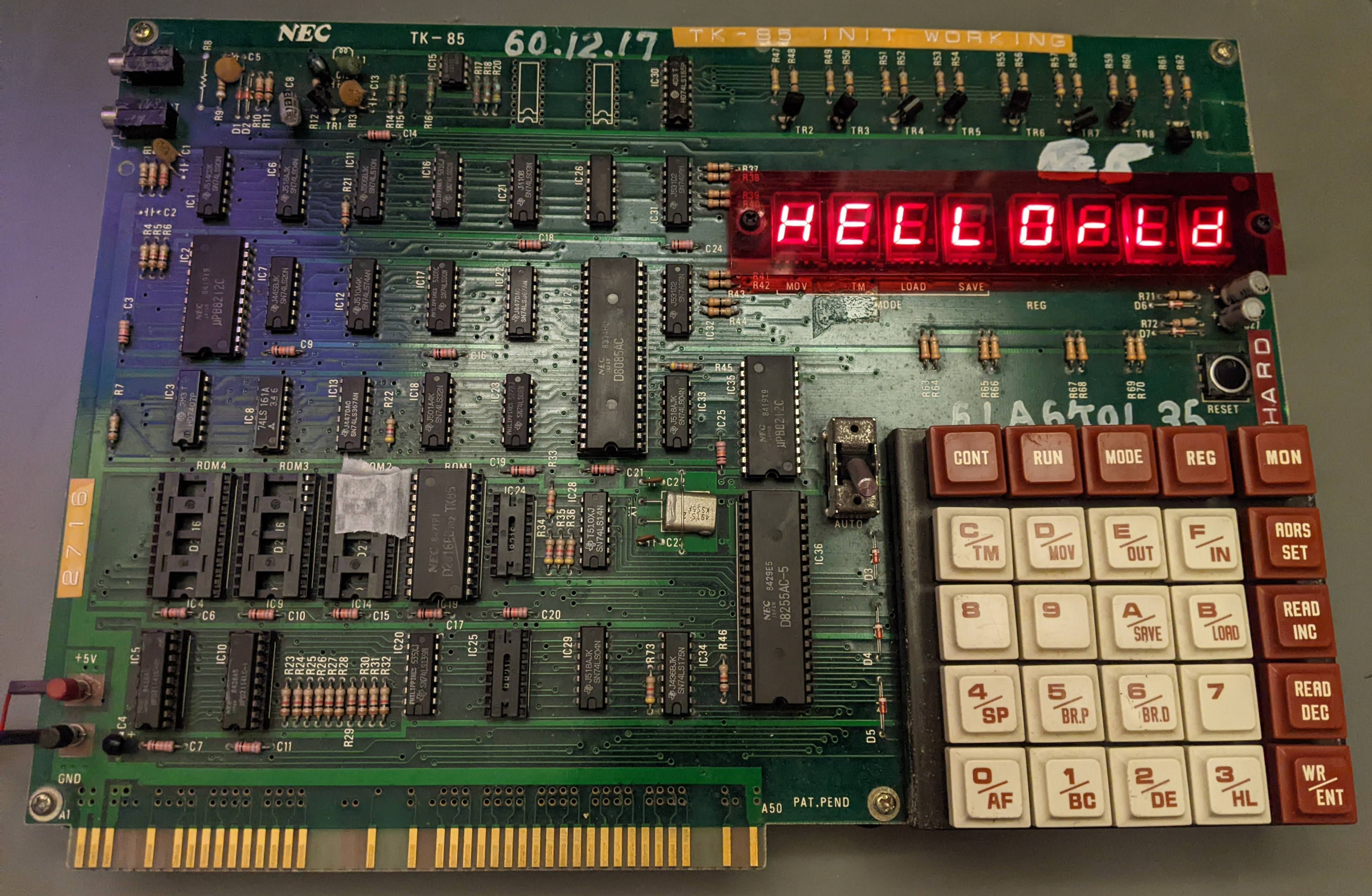
NEC TK-85

- The TK-85 was introduced in May 1980 and was the successor to the TK-80E. It contained the μPD8085AC processor (2.4576 MHz) and has a system configuration that is considered to some extent for compatibility with the TK-80. Other specifications included 2 KB (Max. Up to 8 KB expandable) of ROM, 1 KB of RAM, while the board size was 310 × 220 mm.
- The PDA-80 was a development platform for NEC's microprocessors. It had the μPD8080A processor, 8 KB of RAM, a teleprinter interface and a self assembler for its processor.

== Literature ==
- μCOM-80トレーニング・キット TK-80E/80ユーザーズ・マニアル [μCOM-80 Training Kit TK-80E/80 User's Manual] (in Japanese), 日本電気株式会社 (NEC), IEM-560D
- 大内, 淳義 (1977). マイコン入門 [Mi-com Introduction] (in Japanese). 広済堂出版.
- NEC 1979 Catalog. Wellesley, MA: NEC Microcomputers, Inc. pp. 405–412.
