= The Scrolls of Abadon =

1984 video game

- Developer: Fanda
- Publishers: Access Software; Americana
- Designer: Frank Cohen
- Platforms: Atari 8-bit, Commodore 64
- Release: 1984
- Genre: Maze

The Scrolls of Abadon is a maze video game designed by Frank Cohen and published in 1984 by Access Software for Atari 8-bit computers and Commodore 64.

== Gameplay ==
Atari 8-bit gameplay

The object of The Scrolls of Abadon is to collect all sixteen pieces of magic "amulate", which are spread over four levels of increasing difficulty. The game takes place in an isometric view on a scrolling platform filled with gems, spells, or pieces of "amulate" for the taking. All gems in a location must be collected to activate the "Power Disk", which the player can then use to change the location. Each time the player collects a jewel, an arrow is left behind to indicate the direction they came from, preventing movement in the opposite direction. To complicate matters, a variety of deadly creatures occasionally appear in the maze. Fortunately, there are various spells available in the game that the player can collect. The spell is activated by typing the correct word on the keyboard (provided the player has the corresponding spell).

Points are awarded for collecting gems, a spell, or a piece of "amulate," and extra lives are awarded every 20 000 points.

== Development ==
A pre-release version of the game was titled Hocus Pocus.

== Reception ==
The game received mediocre reviews. Bill Kunkel reviewed the game for Electronic Games and was not impressed: "there is no excuse, in this day and age, for a piece of software this poorly conceived and executed." Zzap!64 was similarly critical in its review and gave the game an overall very poor 28%. Steve Panak was more lenient in his review for ANALOG Computing and stated: "Overall, the Scrolls of Abadon is an interesting game which you can play for a fair amount of time before mastering, the main problem being that there is little motivation to do so."

== See also ==
Other games written by Frank Cohen:

- Clowns and Balloons (1982)
- Cohen's Towers (1983)
- Ghost Chaser (1984)
- Ollie's Follies (1984)
