= Mr. Robot and His Robot Factory =

1983 video game

- Publisher: Datamost
- Designer: Ron Rosen
- Programmers: Ron Rosen (Atari); Robert McNally (Apple)
- Composer: Gary Gilbertson
- Platforms: Atari 8-bit, Apple II, Commodore 64
- Release: 1983
- Genre: Platform
- Mode: Single-player

Mr. Robot and His Robot Factory is a platform game created for Atari 8-bit computers by Ron Rosen and published in 1983 by Datamost. The music was composed by Gary Gilbertson using Philip Price's Advanced Music Processor, while the title screen was drawn by Art Huff. It was ported to the Apple II by Robert McNally and to the Commodore 64.

The gameplay is similar to that of Miner 2049er (1982). The player controls a humanoid robot that must traverse all of the platforms in a factory filled with ladders, conveyor belts, and other gadgetry. There are 22 levels, plus a built-in level editor.

== Gameplay ==
An explosive level (Atari 8-bit)

Commodore 64 version

The robot is moved with either the keyboard or a joystick, and can make it walk side to side, climb up and down, and jump, collecting the white power pills from the platforms in the process. The player begins with four robots, and loses one if it falls too much or touches any of the fireball enemies. When one of the pulsing white rings scattered around the level is collected, the robot becomes temporarily invulnerable and can safely touch the fireballs, destroying them.

In each level the player begins with 100 units of energy and loses units at a rate of about one per second, making quick completion of each level important. When the energy runs out, the player loses a robot.

Points are granted in 10 point increments as the robot advances through the level. Collecting a ring earns 100 points, as does collecting the small musical note at the beginning of the level that turns off the game's sound effects. Dispatching a fireball is worth 500 points. Completing a level earns 100 points per unit of energy remaining on the screen.

Later levels include bombs and magnets. There are a total of 22 levels, not counting the 26 customized levels.

== Reception ==
Mr. Robot and His Robot Factory was reviewed by Video magazine in its "Arcade Alley" column where it was compared to Miner 2049er and described as "sufficiently different [...] to represent an enthralling new test of skill". The reviewers praised the efforts of programmer Ron Rosen, noting that "the programming skill evidenced in the preparation of Mr. Robot is awesome" and concluding "what this game lacks in stark originality, it more than makes up for with polish". InfoWorld's Essential Guide to Atari Computers cited it as among the best Datamost games. It received a positive review in the German magazine Happy Computer.

== See also ==
Other games by Ron Rosen:

- Pacific Coast Highway
- Rosen's Brigade
- Nuclear Nick
