= Dung Beetles (video game) =

1982 video game

- Developer: Datasoft
- Publishers: Datasoft; Tandy; Gentry Software
- Designer: Bob Bishop
- Programmers: Apple II; Bob Bishop; Atari 8-bit Mark Riley; Color Computer; Steve Bjork
- Platforms: Apple II, Atari 8-bit, PC-6001, TRS-80 Color Computer
- Release: 1982
- Genre: Maze
- Mode: Single-player

Dung Beetles is an Apple II maze video game written by Bob Bishop published in 1982 by Datasoft. The gameplay is similar to Pac-Man, but a portion of the maze around the player-controlled character is enlarged as if being viewed through a square magnifying glass.

Dung Beetles was ported to Atari 8-bit computers and the TRS-80 Color Computer. The Color Computer version, programmed by Steve Bjork, was sold by Tandy as Mega-Bug. Later Apple II and Atari versions were renamed to Tumble Bugs. In 1983, Datasoft moved the game to its Gentry Software label with another name change: Magneto Bugs. In Australia, the game was sold as Bug Attack. It was also released for the PC-6000 series.

== Gameplay ==
Here the magnified part of the maze overlaps the score (Atari 8-bit).

The game concept and gameplay are based on Pac-Man, but features are much larger, randomly-generated maze and a moving "magnifying rectangle" that shows the player's character, maze details, and nearby enemies close-up. The objective of the game is to score points by eating all of the dots in the maze. As the player character moves through the maze, it leaves a trail of dung behind. Dung beetles navigate the maze searching for the player. When a beetle finds a trail of dung, it will start following that trail, consuming it as it goes. It picks a direction at random when the trail splits, and goes back to searching if the trail ends.

The game ends when the player's character is caught by a dung beetle, at which point the game plays a digitized voice that says "We gotcha!" and gives a brief animation.

== Reception ==
Softline found the magnifying glass "an impressive programming feat," and concluded that it was "a solid game ... It could stand some more variety, but it certainly does not lack challenge". Writing for ANALOG Computing, Marc Benioff called Tumble Bugs, "an outstanding variation on Pac-Man".
