= Datasoft =

American video game publisher (1980-1987)

- Industry: Video games Productivity software
- Founded: June 12, 1980; 46 years ago
- Founder: Pat Ketchum
- Headquarters: Chatsworth, California, US

Datasoft, Inc. (also written as DataSoft) was a software developer and publisher for home computers founded in 1980 by Pat Ketchum and based out of Chatsworth, California. Datasoft primarily published video games, including ports of arcade video games, games based on licenses from movies and TV shows, and original games. Like competitor Synapse Software, they also published other software: development tools, word processors, and utilities. Text Wizard, written by William Robinson and published by Datasoft when he was 16, was the basis for AtariWriter. Datasoft initially targeted the Atari 8-bit computers, Apple II, and TRS-80 Color Computer, then later the Commodore 64, IBM PC, Atari ST, and Amiga. Starting in 1983, a line of lower cost games was published under the label Gentry Software.

Datasoft went into bankruptcy, and its name and assets were purchased by two Datasoft executives, Samuel L. Poole and Ted Hoffman. They renamed the company IntelliCreations and distributed Datasoft games until it closed.

== Software ==
=== Games ===
1982

- Canyon Climber
- Clowns and Balloons
- Dung Beetles
- Pacific Coast Highway
- Shooting Arcade
- The Sands of Egypt

1983

- Genesis
- Juno First, arcade port
- Moon Shuttle, arcade port
- Nibbler, arcade port
- O'Riley's Mine
- Pooyan, arcade port
- Zaxxon, arcade port

1984

- Conan
- Bruce Lee
- Lost Tomb, arcade port
- The Dallas Quest
- Mancopter
- Mr. Do!, arcade port
- Pac-Man, arcade port
- Pole Position, arcade port

1985

- Alternate Reality: The City
- The Goonies
- Tomahawk
- Zorro

1986

- Crosscheck
- Mercenary
- Mind Pursuit

1987

- 221B Baker Street
- Alternate Reality: The Dungeon
- Bismarck
- Black Magic
- Dark Lord
- Force 7
- Gunslinger
- Saracen
- Napoleon in Russia: Borodino 1812 (MS-DOS)

1988

- Terramex

=== Games under the Gentry Software label ===
- Leap'in Lizards! (1983)
- Magneto Bugs (1983)
- Maniac Miner (1983)
- Maxwell's Demon / Memory Mania (1983)
- Rosen's Brigade (1983)
- Sea Bandit (1983)
- Spiderquake (1983)
- Starbase Fighter (1983)
- Target Practice (1983)

=== Education ===
- Bishop's Square / Maxwell's Demon (1982)

=== Word processing ===
- Text Wizard (1981)
- Spell Wizard (1982)
- Letter Wizard (1984)

=== Other software ===
- Micro-Painter (1982)
