= 221B Baker Street (video game) =

1986 video game

- Developer: Datasoft
- Publisher: Datasoft
- Platforms: Apple II, Atari 8-bit, Atari ST, Commodore 64, IBM PC
- Release: NA: 1986
- Genre: Board
- Modes: Single-player, multiplayer

221B Baker Street is a 1986 video game published by Datasoft, based on an earlier board game of the same name. The game was inspired by the exploits of Arthur Conan Doyle's fictional detective Sherlock Holmes and derives its title from the detective's residence at 221B Baker Street in London. The original board game was created and copyrighted by American writer Jay Moriarty (dba Antler Productions) in 1975.

== Gameplay ==
Gameplay screenshot (Atari ST)

Up to four players compete against each other to solve various mysteries in and around Victorian London. Each player can assume the role of one of four characters from the Sherlock Holmes books—Sherlock Holmes, Dr. Watson, Irene Adler or Inspector Lestrade—and can select from 30 different adventures. Case file for each mystery are provided in the manual and give the particulars of the case, including key clues and suspects.

To solve the case, players roll dice to move among 15 different locales throughout London, collecting the clues necessary to unravel the mystery. Each player also visits Scotland Yard to collect a badge, which allows him to "lock" a particular location on the map, making access to it by the other players more difficult. Once a player believes he has solved the case, he returns to Baker Street where he must successfully answer a quiz. Play ends when a player successfully passes the quiz.

== Reception ==
Harvey Bernstein reviewed the game for Antic and stated that "I will admit that the graphics are fairly good but, aside from a handful of quotes in the documentation, no attempt is made to capture the style of Sir Arthur Conan Doyle's beloved text."
