= Cohen's Towers =

1983 video game

- Developer: Fanda
- Publishers: Datamost; Databyte (UK)
- Designer: Frank Cohen
- Platforms: Atari 8-bit, Commodore 64
- Release: 1983
- Genre: Platform

Cohen's Towers is a platform game written by Frank Cohen and published by Datamost in 1983 for Atari 8-bit computers and Commodore 64. It was re-released in 1986 by Databyte in the United Kingdom.

== Gameplay ==
Gameplay screenshot (Atari 8-bit)

In Cohen's Towers the player plays the part of Allen, starting his new job as a mail boy. He has to collect mail parcels one at the time from different floors and deliver them to any of the three available 'mail drops'. To move up and down between the floors the player can use different elevators, but if he stays on one for too long a falling plant pot will knock him off. The player's work is also hindered by a dog pursuing him on most of the floors, or a sleepwalker.

Once the player collected and deposited all the parcels in the building, the Boss shows up and takes him to the next one. There are three different buildings in the game – Fanda, Datamost, and Cohen's Tower – each one harder to complete.

=== Music ===
Cohen's Towers Audio Clip (Atari 8-bit)
Music theme that plays when the player loses a life. An excerpt from Scott Joplin's New Rag.

The game's music is one of the first examples of adaptive music. Different tunes accompany unusual occurrences: a dog chasing the player, a sleepwalker appearance, the Boss checking on the player's work. The main theme is an arrangement of Scott Joplin's "Elite Syncopations".

== Reception ==
Steve Panak wrote in his column in the 1984 ANALOG Computing holiday issue, "don't even consider buying it. Cohen's Towers gives big business a bad name, and all copies should be piled up and turned into a towering inferno". In a 1985 review for Page 6 Jim Short wrote: "it is an original and highly addictive game with great graphics and even better sound. [...] Cohen's Towers is an excellent little game that I can highly recommend." Lloyd Davies, writing in Ahoy!, praised the "colorful scrolling screens and clever visual effects" and the game's learning curve, calling it "an arcade-quality piece of software."

Writing for InfoWorld in March 1984, Scott Mace called it "one of the most humorous video games ever," joking that: "Now, for every mail clerk, everywhere [...], there's a video game that sums up what a fun job it can be". InfoWorld's Essential Guide to Atari Computers cited it as among the best Datamost arcade games. In the journal Education, Research and Perspectives, Michael Scriven called it a "novelty" game whose "whimsy is central though not oppressive."

== See also ==
Other games written by Frank Cohen:

- Clowns and Balloons (1982)
- Ghost Chaser (1984)
- Ollie's Follies (1984)
- The Scrolls of Abadon (1984)
