= Tomahawk (video game) =

1985 video game

- Developer: Digital Integration
- Publisher: Datasoft
- Platforms: Amstrad CPC, Amstrad PCW, Apple II, Apple IIGS, Atari 8-bit, Commodore 64, MS-DOS, ZX Spectrum
- Release: 1985
- Genre: Combat flight simulator

Tomahawk is a video game published by Datasoft in 1985. Tomahawk is a game in which the player pilots a AH-64 Apache attack helicopter.

== Reception ==
M. Evan Brooks reviewed the game for Computer Gaming World, and stated that "Tomahawk does offer cloudbase and turbulence as interesting options, but overall, the simulation is simply not innovative or exciting enough to justify a strong recommendation." Sinclair User gave the game an SU Classic award.
