= Bruce Lee (video game) =

1984 video game

- Developer: Datasoft
- Publishers: Datasoft; U.S. Gold (CPC, Spectrum); Comptiq (MSX)
- Designer: Ron J. Fortier
- Artist: Kelly Day
- Composer: John A. Fitzpatrick
- Platforms: Amstrad CPC, Apple II, Atari 8-bit, BBC Micro, Commodore 64, IBM PC, MSX, PC-88, ZX Spectrum
- Release: April 1984: Atari 8-bit; NA: April 1984 Apple, C64, IBM PC, PC-88 1984 Spectrum, BBC, MSX 1985 Amstrad 1986
- Genres: Beat 'em up, platform
- Modes: Single-player, multiplayer

Bruce Lee is a platform game written by Ron J. Fortier for Atari 8-bit computers and published in 1984 by Datasoft. The graphics are done by Kelly Day and music is done by John A. Fitzpatrick. The player takes the role of Bruce Lee, while a second player controls either Yamo or alternates with player one for control of Bruce Lee.

The Commodore 64 and Apple II versions were released the same year. The game was converted to the ZX Spectrum and Amstrad CPC and published by U.S. Gold. It was the first U.S. Gold release featuring a famous individual. The MSX version was published in 1985 by Comptiq.

== Gameplay ==
Bruce and the Ninja are fighting at the bottom centre. Yamo is preparing to fall from the left-hand platform (ZX Spectrum).

The plot involves the eponymous martial artist advancing from chamber to chamber in a wizard's tower, seeking to claim infinite wealth and the secret of immortality. There are twenty chambers, each represented by a single screen with platforms and ladders. To progress, the player must collect a number of lanterns suspended from various points in the chamber.

Most chambers are guarded by two mobile enemies; The Ninja, who attacks with a "bokken stick" and The Green Yamo, a large unarmed warrior, visually styled as a sumo wrestler but attacking with punches and "crushing kicks". On platforms with sufficient graphics support, Yamo's skin is actually pictured as green, though in cover art he has a natural human skin tone.

A multiplayer mode allows a second player to control Yamo, or to allow two players to alternately control Bruce. If the player playing Yamo is inactive for a certain time, the computer takes over. The Ninja and Yamo are also vulnerable to the screen's dangers, but have infinite lives so they always return; whereas Yamo is consistently identified as a single person, one version of the manual implies that each reappearance of the ninja is a new individual, replacing the previous one.

Later chambers include more hazards such as mines and moving walls, as well as a "comb-like" surface that has an electric spark racing along it. Skilful walking, climbing, ducking and jumping are required to negotiate them. On the twentieth screen, Lee finally faces the evil Fire Wizard.

Upon completing the game, it "loops" again. From the second loop on, the Ninja and Yamo are replaced as soon as they are killed, and the safe spots in the room with multiple electrified combs are removed.

Commodore 64 title screen

== Reception ==
Reception

Review scores
Publication	Score	
Publication	PC	ZX
Crash		91%
Computer and Video Games		35/40
Sinclair User		4/5
Your Sinclair		44%
Computer Entertainer	7/8 (Atari)	
Sinclair Programs		75%
ZX Computing		4/5

Award
Publication	Award
Crash	Crash Smash

The game was in the top ten of the UK software charts by May 1985, and topped the Atari chart by July 1985. The following month, it was number-eight on the all-formats chart and number-one on the Atari chart.

Computer Gaming World stated that the Atari version "delivers all the foot kicking, kick jabbing, quick ducking action-packed adventure you'd expect from a good grade B, martial arts movie". InfoWorld's Essential Guide to Atari Computers also cited it as a good Atari 8-bit arcade game. The ZX Spectrum version of Bruce Lee received enthusiastic reviews. CRASH magazine awarded 91%, highlighting zesty graphics, enjoyable fighting action and addictivity. Sinclair User also found the game enjoyable, awarding 4 out of 5 stars, but felt that sound was underused and a larger variety of tasks could have been included. Your Spectrum were more critical, pointing out that it only takes a few games to complete all 20 chambers. Home Computing Weekly praised the graphics and movement.

In a 1990 retrospective, Your Sinclair found that Bruce Lee was still too easy to complete and the graphics had not aged well. In addition, it was felt that the fighting moves available to the player lacked impact and were too limited for a beat 'em up. It was described as a historically important game, being the first to combine the platform/collection and beat 'em up genres.

== Legacy ==
The game was included on the 1986 ZX Spectrum compilation They Sold a Million II, along with Match Point, Match Day, and Knight Lore.

The remake Ultimate Bruce Lee which includes better graphics and new game modes, was released for Microsoft Windows in 2005. The original game was unofficially ported to the Game Boy Advance (2003) and Master System (2015). The unofficial sequel Bruce Lee II was released in 2013 for Windows and in 2015 for the Commodore 64.

== See also ==
- Bruceploitation
