= PC-8800 series =

Series of computers sold in Japan by NEC

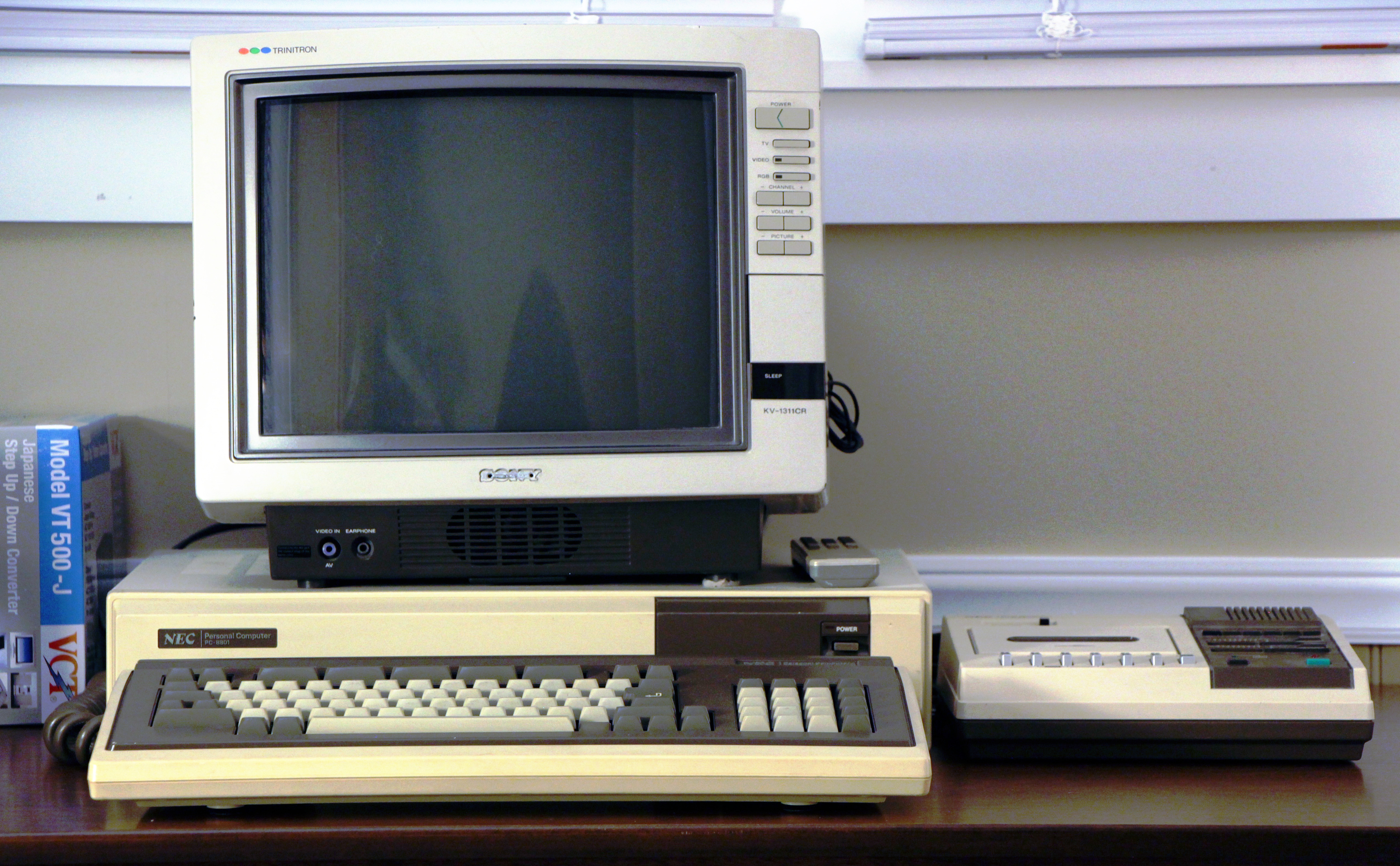
- PC-8801
- Developer: NEC
- Manufacturer: New Nippon Electric (NEC Home Electronics)
- Type: Home computer
- Released: November 1981; 44 years ago
- Operating system: N-88 BASIC
- CPU: NEC μPD780C-1 @ 4 MHz and higher
- Memory: 64 kilobytes and higher
- Display: Text 80 × 25, graphics 160 × 100, 8 colors (and higher)
- Graphics: SGP
- Sound: Internal beeper (and higher)
- Power: 100 VAC
- Predecessor: PC-8000 series
- Successor: PC-9800 series

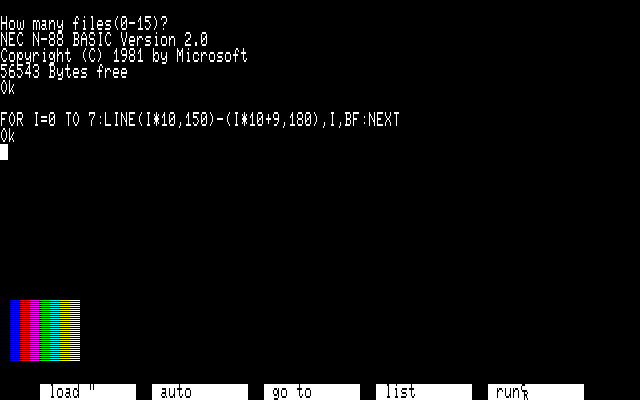
Boot screen with one-liner

The PC-8800 series (Japanese: PC-8800シリーズ, Hepburn: Pī Shī Hassen Happyaku Shirīzu), commonly shortened to PC-88, are a brand of Zilog Z80-based 8-bit home computers released by NEC in 1981 and primarily sold in Japan.

The PC-8800 series sold extremely well and became one of the four major Japanese home computers of the 1980s, along with the Fujitsu FM-7, Sharp X1 and the MSX computers. It was later eclipsed by NEC's 16-bit PC-9800 series, although it still maintained strong sales up until the early 1990s.

NEC's American subsidiary, NEC Home Electronics (USA), marketed variations of the PC-8800 in the United States and Canada.

== History ==
Nippon Electric's Microcomputer Sales Section of the Electronic Device Sales Division launched the PC-8001 in September 1979, and by 1981 it accounted for 40% of the Japanese personal computer market. In April 1981, Nippon Electric decided to expand personal computer lines into three groups: New Nippon Electric, Information Processing Group and Electronic Devices Group, with each specializing in a particular series. The Microcomputer Sales Section was reformed to the Microcomputer and Application Division in June 1980, and was renamed to the Personal Computer Division in April 1981. At that time, Japanese personal computers were mostly used by hobbyists. The division introduced the PC-8801 in November 1981 and intended to expand the personal computer market into the business world.

The PC-8801 was capable of displaying Kanji characters via an optional Kanji ROM board. Various companies released Japanese word processor software for the machine, such as My Letter (マイレター), Writing (文筆, Bunpitsu), and Yūkara (ユーカラ). NEC themselves released Japanese Word Processor (日本語ワードプロセッサ) which was a rebranded version of Yukara, but it was not a success. In addition to office software, companies like Enix and Koei released many popular games for the system, establishing the PC-8801 as a strong gaming platform. By November 1983, the PC-8801 had shipped 170,000 units. The PC-8801's direct successor, the PC-8801mkII, came with a JIS level 1 kanji font ROM, a smaller case and keyboard, and, in the models 20 and 30, one or two internal 5 1/4-inch 2D floppy disk drives. This set of PC-8800 computers sold more units than the PC-9800 series at that time.

By December 1983, NEC had multiple personal computer lines coming out from different divisions. NEC's Information Processing group had the PC-9800 series, and NEC Home Electronics had the PC-6000 series. To avoid competing with itself, NEC decided to consolidate their personal computer business into two divisions; the NEC Home Electronics division dealt with the 8-bit home computer line, and the Information Processing group dealt with the 16-bit personal computer line. The Electronic Device Sales division spun off personal computer business into NEC Home Electronics.

In March 1985, NEC Home Electronics introduced the PC-8801mkIISR, which had improved graphics and sound capabilities. A cost-reduced version, the PC-8801mkIIFR, shipped 60,000 units for half a year. Although the PC-9801VM shipments surpassed it, the PC-8800 series was still popular as a Japanese PC game platform until the early 1990s.

== Hardware ==
=== Graphics ===
Throughout the lifetime of the PC-8800, there were four different graphics modes. They are as follows:

- N mode: PC-8000 series compatible graphic mode
- V1 mode: 640 × 200 8 colors, 640 × 400 2 colors
- V2 mode (PC-8801mkII SR and later models): 640 × 200 8 out of 512 colors, 640 × 400 2 out of 512 colors
- V3 mode (exclusive to the PC-88VA models): 640 × 200: 65536 colors, 640 × 400: 256 out of 65536 colors, 320 × 200: 65536 colors, 320 × 400: 64 out of 65536 colors

No entry in the PC-8800 series was capable of displaying all four modes.

=== Sound ===
The early computers in the PC-8800 series use a simple one-voice internal speaker, like the Apple II, PC-8000 and IBM PC, capable of generating beeps and clicks. Later models added FM-synthesis chips for much more elaborate audio.

== Software ==
Companies that produced exclusive software for the NEC PC-8801 included Enix, Square, Sega, Taito, Nihon Falcom, Bandai, HAL Laboratory, ASCII, Namco, Pony Canyon, Technology and Entertainment Software, Wolf Team, Capcom, Dempa, Champion Soft, Starcraft, Micro Cabin, PSK, and Bothtec. Certain games produced for the PC-8801 had a shared release with the MSX, such as those produced by Game Arts, ELF Corporation, and Konami. Many popular series first appeared on the NEC PC-8801, including Snatcher, Thexder, Dragon Slayer, RPG Maker, Sokoban, and Ys. There were also ports of famous games from other systems, such as Might and Magic: Book One The Secret of the Inner Sanctum..

Nintendo licensed Hudson Soft to port some of Nintendo's Family Computer games for the platform, including Excitebike, Balloon Fight, Tennis, Golf, and Ice Climber, as well as new editions of Mario Bros. called Mario Bros. Special and Punch Ball Mario Bros., a semi-sequel to Donkey Kong 3 titled Donkey Kong 3: Dai Gyakushū.

The computer also had its own BASIC dialect, N88-BASIC.

== Model list ==
Release year	Model name	Model	CPU	RAM	VRAM	N mode	V1 mode	V2 mode	V3 mode	Sound	Atari D-sub 9-pin I/O port	FDD	CD-ROM	Operating system	Comment
1981	PC-8801		NEC μPD780C-1 4 MHz	64 KB	48 KB	Yes	Yes	No	No	Internal beeper like in the IBM PC	No	No	No	NEC N-88 BASIC	4 expansion board slot.
1983	PC-8801mkII	model 10	NEC μPD780C-1 4 MHz	64 KB	48 KB	Yes	Yes	No	No	Beeper	No	No	No		
1983	PC-8801mkII	model 20	NEC μPD780C-1 4 MHz	64 KB	48 KB	Yes	Yes	No	No	Beeper	No	1× 5.25" 2D	No		
1983	PC-8801mkII	model 30	NEC μPD780C-1 4 MHz	64 KB	48 KB	Yes	Yes	No	No	Beeper	No	2× 5.25" 2D	No		
1985	PC-8801mkII SR	model 10	NEC μPD780C-1 4 MHz	64 KB	48 KB	Yes	Yes	Yes	No	FM (YM2203) Mono	Yes	No	No		The V2 mode that is necessary to play most PC-88 games is introduced. With D-sub 9pin Atari joystick port.
1985	PC-8801mkII SR	model 20	NEC μPD780C-1 4 MHz	64 KB	48 KB	Yes	Yes	Yes	No	FM (YM2203) Mono	Yes	1× 5.25" 2D	No		The V2 mode that is necessary to play most PC-88 games is introduced. With D-sub 9pin Atari joystick port.
1985	PC-8801mkII SR	model 30	NEC μPD780C-1 4 MHz	64 KB	48 KB	Yes	Yes	Yes	No	FM (YM2203) Mono	Yes	2× 5.25" 2D	No		The V2 mode that is necessary to play most PC-88 games is introduced. With D-sub 9pin Atari joystick port.
1985	PC-8801mkII TR		NEC μPD780C-1 4 MHz	64 KB	48 KB	Yes	Yes	Yes	No	FM (YM2203) Mono	Yes	2× 5.25" 2D	No		PC-8801 mkII SR with 300 bit/s modem
1985	PC-8801mkII FR	model 10	NEC μPD780C-1 4 MHz	64 KB	48 KB	No	Yes	Yes	No	FM (YM2203) Mono	Yes	No	No		Cost-reduced version of PC-8801mkIISR
1985	PC-8801mkII FR	model 20	NEC μPD780C-1 4 MHz	64 KB	48 KB	No	Yes	Yes	No	FM (YM2203) Mono	Yes	1× 5.25" 2D	No		Cost-reduced version of PC-8801mkIISR
1985	PC-8801mkII FR	model 30	NEC μPD780C-1 4 MHz	64 KB	48 KB	No	Yes	Yes	No	FM (YM2203) Mono	Yes	2× 5.25" 2D	No		Cost-reduced version of PC-8801mkIISR
1985	PC-8801mkII MR		NEC μPD780C-1 4 MHz	192 KB	48 KB	No	Yes	Yes	No	FM (YM2203) Mono	Yes	2× 5.25" 2HD	No		FDD 2D->2HD
1986	PC-8801 FH	model 10	NEC µPD70008 8 MHz	64 KB	48 KB	No	Yes	Yes	No	FM (YM2203) Mono	Yes	No	No		88FR CPU upgrade. model30（B）is black color model.
1986	PC-8801 FH	model 20	NEC µPD70008 8 MHz	64 KB	48 KB	No	Yes	Yes	No	FM (YM2203) Mono	Yes	1× 5.25" 2D	No		88FR CPU upgrade. model30（B）is black color model.
1986	PC-8801 FH	model 30	NEC µPD70008 8 MHz	64 KB	48 KB	No	Yes	Yes	No	FM (YM2203) Mono	Yes	2× 5.25" 2D	No		88FR CPU upgrade. model30（B）is black color model.
1986	PC-8801 MH		NEC µPD70008 8 MHz	192 KB	48 KB	No	Yes	Yes	No	FM (YM2203) Mono	Yes	2× 5.25" 2HD	No		88MR CPU upgrade
1987	PC-88 VA		NEC μPD9002 8 MHz	512 KB	256 KB	No	Yes	Yes	Yes	FM (YM2203) Mono	Yes	2× 5.25" 2HD	No		CPU upgrade (8-bit to 16-bit)
1987	PC-8801 FA		NEC µPD70008 8 MHz	64 KB	48 KB	No	Yes	Yes	No	FM (YM2608) Stereo + ADPCM Mono	Yes	2× 5.25" 2D	No		sound card upgrade (88FH + sound board2(Yamaha YM2608))
1987	PC-8801 MA		NEC µPD70008 8 MHz	192 KB	48 KB	No	Yes	Yes	No	FM (YM2608) Stereo + ADPCM Mono	Yes	2× 5.25" 2HD	No		sound card upgrade (88MH + sound board2(Yamaha YM2608))
1988	PC-88 VA2		NEC μPD9002 8 MHz	512 KB	256 KB	No	Yes	Yes	Yes	FM (YM2608) Stereo + ADPCM Mono	Yes	2× 5.25" 2HD	No		
1988	PC-88 VA3		NEC μPD9002 8 MHz	512 KB	256 KB	No	Yes	Yes	Yes	FM (YM2608) Stereo + ADPCM Mono	Yes	2× 5.25" 2HD / 1× 3.5" 2TD	No		add 2TD FDD
1988	PC-8801 FE		NEC µPD70008 8 MHz	64 KB	48 KB	No	Yes	Yes	No	FM (YM2203) Mono	Yes	2× 5.25" 2D	No		TV(NTSC) output (composite video), del external I/O
1988	PC-8801 MA2		NEC µPD70008 8 MHz	192 KB	48 KB	No	Yes	Yes	No	FM (YM2608) Stereo + ADPCM Mono	Yes	2× 5.25" 2HD	No		88MA model change
1989	PC-8801 FE2		NEC µPD70008 8 MHz	64 KB	48 KB	No	Yes	Yes	No	FM (YM2203) Mono	Yes	2× 5.25" 2D	No		88FE model change
1989	PC-8801 MC	model 1	NEC µPD70008 8 MHz	192 KB	48 KB	No	Yes	Yes	No	FM (YM2608) Stereo + ADPCM Mono	Yes	2× 5.25" 2HD	Optional		
1989	PC-8801 MC	model 2	NEC µPD70008 8 MHz	192 KB	48 KB	No	Yes	Yes	No	FM (YM2608) Stereo + ADPCM Mono	Yes	2× 5.25" 2HD	Yes		

Preceded by NEC PC-8001; NEC PC-6001; NEC PC-6601	NEC Personal Computers	Succeeded by NEC PC-9801
