= PC-8000 series =

NEC personal computer line

PC-8001

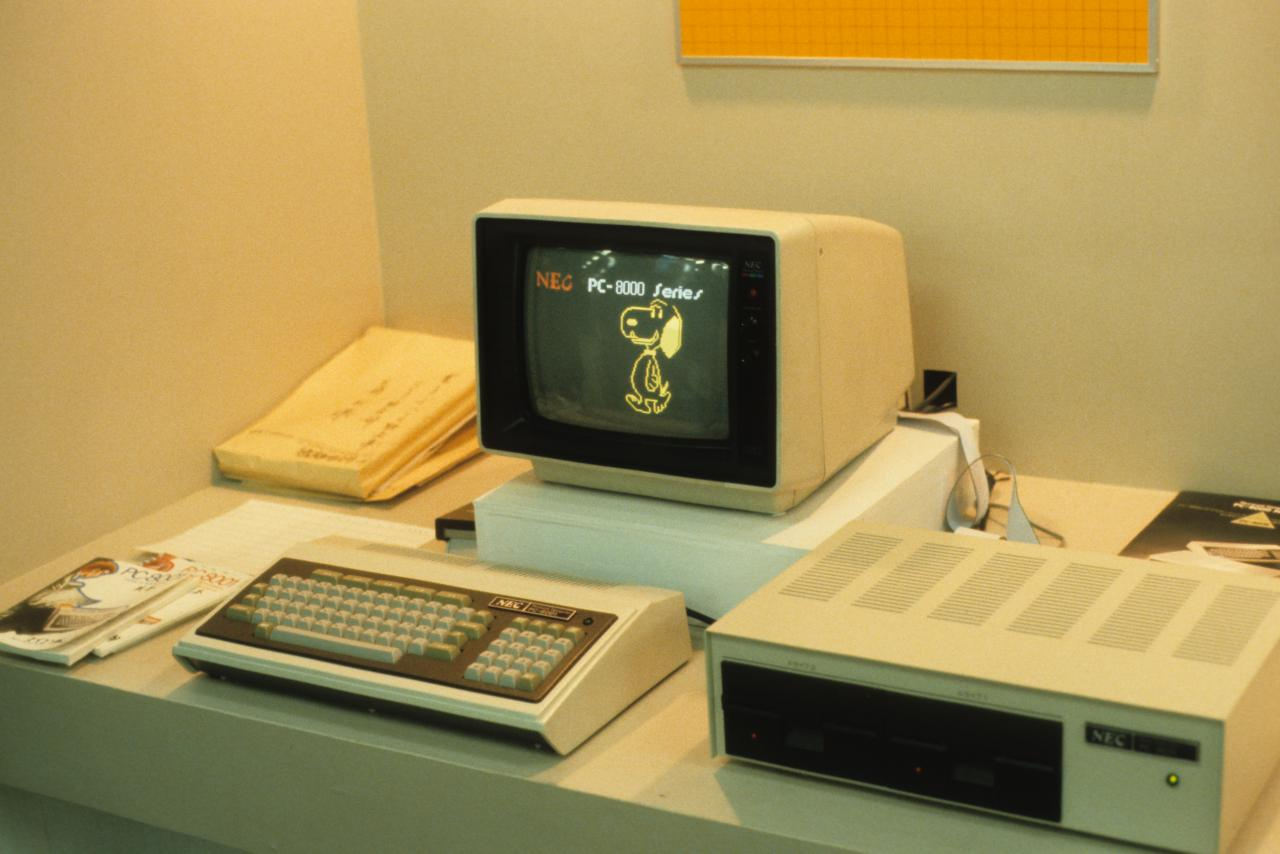
- PC-8001 with monitor and external floppy
- Developer: Nippon Electric
- Manufacturer: New Nippon Electric
- Type: Home computer
- Released: 1979; 47 years ago
- Introductory price: 168,000 yen (equivalent to ¥268,425 in 2024); US$1,295 (equivalent to $4,586 in 2025); CA$1,495 (equivalent to $4,051 in 2025)
- Discontinued: July 1987
- Units sold: 250,000 (PC-8001)
- Operating system: NEC BASIC, DISK BASIC, CP/M
- CPU: NEC μPD780C-1 (Z80 compatible) @ 4 MHz
- Memory: ROM 24 KB, RAM 16 KB
- Display: Text 80 × 25, Graphics 160 × 100, 8 colors
- Graphics: NEC μPD3301 CRT + μPD8257C (Intel 8257 clone) DMA
- Sound: Beeper
- Power: AC 100 V 50/60 Hz 20 W
- Dimensions: 430(W) × 260(D) × 80(H) mm (16.9(W) × 10.2(D) × 3.1(H) inches)
- Weight: 4 kg (8.8 lbs)
- Predecessor: COMPO BS/80
- Successor: NEC PC-6001; NEC PC-8801

The PC-8000 series (Japanese: PC-8000シリーズ, Hepburn: Pī-Shī Hassen Shirīzu) is a line of personal computers developed for the Japanese market by NEC. The PC-8001 model was also sold in the United States and Canada as the PC-8001A.

Original models of the NEC PC-8001B (or sometimes the NEC PC-8000) were also sold in some European countries like in the UK, France, Spain, Italy and the Netherlands and in Australia and New Zealand as well.

== PC-8001 ==
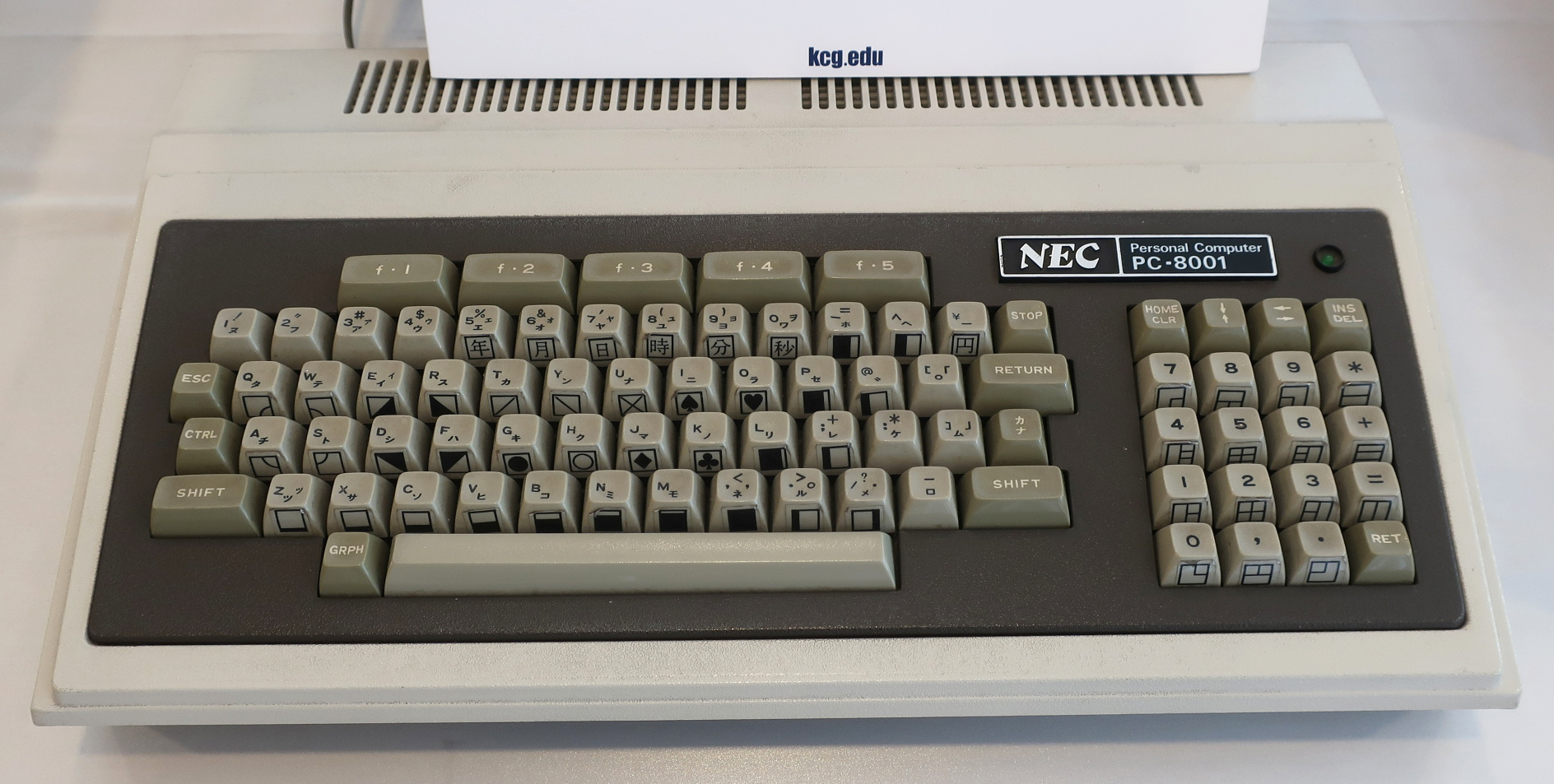
Original PC-8001

The first member of the PC-8000 series, the PC-8001 was first introduced on May 9, 1979, and went on sale in September 1979 for ¥168,000. Its design combines the keyboard and the mainboard into a single unit. At a time when most microcomputers were sold as "semi-kits" requiring end user assembly, the fully assembled PC-8001 was a rarity in the market. Peripherals included a printer, a cassette tape storage unit, and a CRT interface. Although it is often believed to be the first domestically produced personal computer for the Japanese market, it was preceded by both the Hitachi Basic Master and the Sharp MZ-80K.

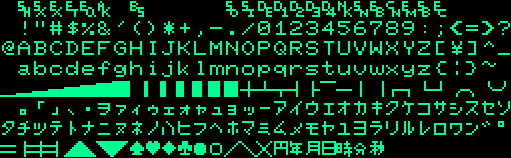
The character set of the PC-8001

The PC-8001A was released in the United States in August 1981, and was priced at US$1,295 (32 KB of RAM). It is modified to reduce electromagnetic interference to comply with FCC regulations. The Katakana glyphs in the character ROM (see JIS X 0201) are replaced by Greek alphabet.

=== Specification ===
The PC-8001 has an NEC μPD780C-1 (Z80-compatible processor) clocked at 4 MHz, 16 KB of RAM (expandable to 32 KB), CRT video output, cassette port, parallel port for a printer, serial port and an expansion bus. The built-in BASIC interpreter, called N-BASIC, fits in 24 KB of ROM. This is a variant of Microsoft Disk BASIC 4.51. Optional DISK BASIC allows disk I/O for an external floppy drive. The video output is provided by an NEC μPD3301 CRT controller and a μPD8257C (Intel 8257 clone) DMA controller. It has various text modes, and the maximum screen is 80×25 text with 8×8 pixel font. Each character has two attributes chosen from blinking, highlight, reverse, secret, vertical line, over line, under line and eight colors (3-bit RGB hardware color palette), and up to 20 different attributes per line can be set. The attribution also supports semigraphics, and each characters have a 2×4 matrix.

The PC-8011 Expansion Unit provides additional capabilities and interfaces, which has 32 KB RAM sockets for μPD416 DRAMs, 8 KB ROM sockets for 2716 PROMs, an interrupt controller, an interval timer, a serial port, a floppy drive controller, a parallel port and an IEEE-488 port. Original floppy disk drives for the PC-8001 are the dual-unit PC-8031 and the additional dual-unit PC-8032, which use 143 KB single-sided 5.25-inch format. They were followed by the single-unit PC-8031-1V, the dual-sided PC-8031-2W and PC-8032-2W. These units are attached to the PC-8001 through the PC-8011 or the PC-8033 adapter.

=== Development ===
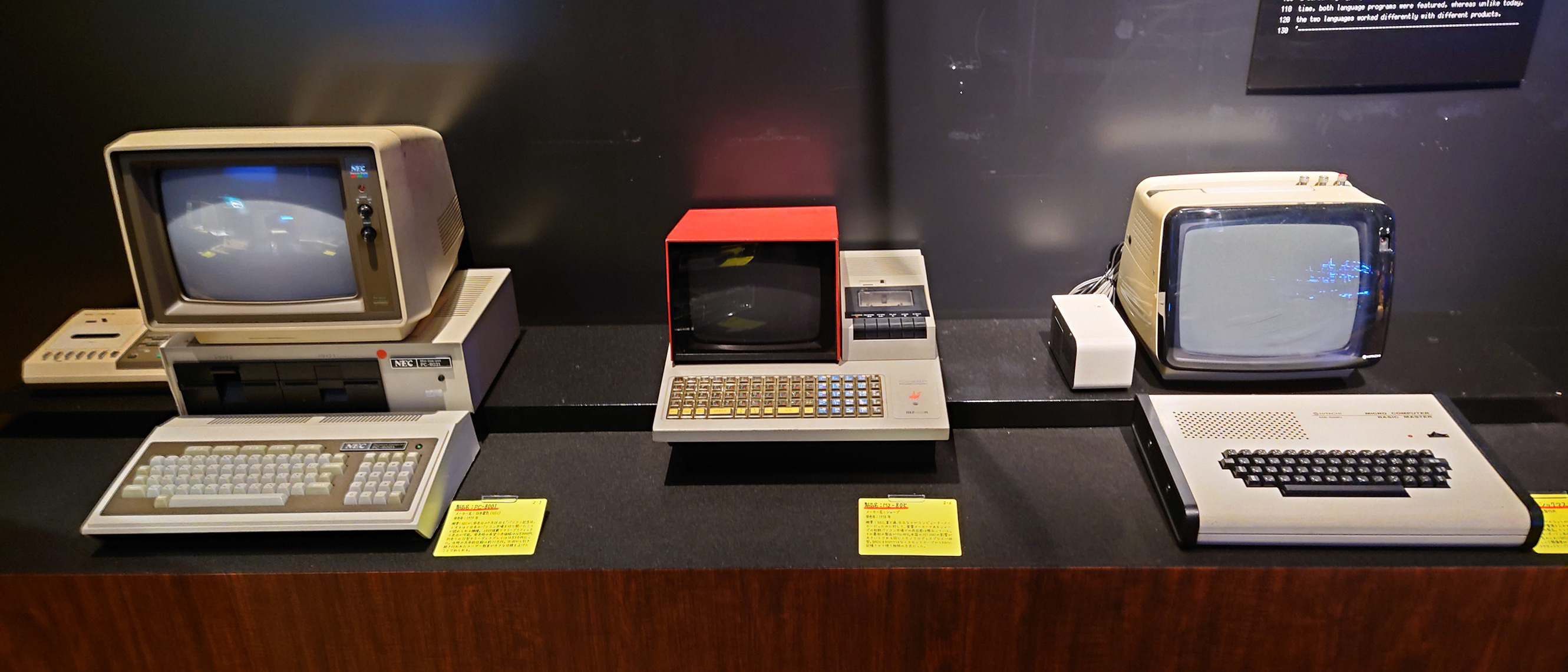
The PC-8001, the Sharp MZ and the Hitachi Basic Master became popular in Japan by 1980.

In Japan, Nippon Electric's Microcomputer Sales Section in the Electronic Device Sales Division released the TK-80 in 1976, a single-board computer kit, and it became popular among hobbyists. American personal computers were expensive for personal use (Initial list price of the Apple II was 358,000 yen, Commodore PET was 298,000 yen, and the TRS-80 was 248,000 yen). In 1978, the Hitachi Basic Master and Sharp MZ-80K, both developed by consumer electronics companies, were released as personal computers targeted for hobbyists, not for business use.

In the summer of 1978, the Microcomputer Sales Section started developing the PC-8001, codenamed "PCX-1". The development team consisted of 10 engineers including section manager Kazuya Watanabe(engineer) (渡邊 和也) and chief designer Tomio Gotō (後藤 富雄). They had already planned to release a version of the TK-80BS within a plastic case as a personal computer. It was released as the COMPO BS/80, but it failed in the market due to its poor built-in BASIC and slow clock speed. The PC-8001 was intended to be a high-performance and inexpensive computer for personal use.

When Goto visited Silicon Valley to survey the application of microprocessors, he ran across Kazuhiko Nishi at a computer store. They only exchanged business cards, but Nishi introduced Microsoft to him after he returned to Japan. Goto thought of visiting Microsoft, but he worried that the trip wouldn't be accepted by his boss because Microsoft was a small company. Instead, he attended the fall 1978 West Coast Computer Faire during its first day. The next day, he met Bill Gates at the airport in Albuquerque. After lunch, they went to Microsoft's office, and then Gates told him the importance of having a de facto standard. Goto agreed.

The team had already been developing a BASIC interpreter, but Watanabe decided to adopt Microsoft BASIC because it was widely used in the North American market. At that time, Microsoft and ASCII (the main Microsoft dealer in Japan) intended to expand OEM business in Japan, so N-BASIC was provided for NEC with a very low licence fee. It had been developed at Microsoft's office in Seattle, and NEC provided a wirewrapped prototype, known as the PC-8001g.

The Electronic Device Group only had a small distribution network of electronic parts stores, and the Information Processing Group only had corporate customers who purchased expensive mainframe computers. Also, they didn't have the capability for mass production. They asked New Nippon Electric (NEC Home Electronics since 1983) to sell the personal computers through their consumer distribution network. The system unit, displays and storage devices were all developed by NEC, and manufactured by New Nippon Electric. Printers were provided from Tokyo Denki (Toshiba TEC) because NEC had only developed expensive printers for mainframes.

Other NEC divisions didn't appreciate the project before the PC-8001 went on sale. Most people, even in NEC, didn't know about microcomputers, and they couldn't understand what the Microcomputer Sales Section aimed for. The TK-80 sold well for computer enthusiasts, but the computer division regarded it as a toy. Their projects were often criticized inside the company. Watanabe recalled that engineers of the computer division criticized microcomputers didn't have parity bit checking, and they assumed the microprocessors of the time were not suitable for computing due to their lack of performance and reliability. He believed microprocessors were more reliable than wirewrapped minicomputers. When he circulated the contract with Microsoft for approval, computer division's director criticized they planned to purchase the software from a small company. Inside the company, it was considered engineers were confident in their softwares and had to develop softwares themselves. He explained to the director, "It's profitable, so there is no problem. We are salesmen." Watanabe knew importance of the industrial standard and third party developers, but his perception was against company's practice.

Watanabe's bosses, Electronic Device Sales Division manager Morichika Sawanobori (沢登 盛親) and executive director Atsuyoshi Ōuchi (大内 淳義), let him do what he wanted. When he suggested the TK-80 project, Sawanobori supported him in anticipation that it would expand the microprocessor market, and Ouchi trusted their decision. When he planned to develop the personal computer, Ouchi wavered. It would become a computer product involved in NEC's core business, and would influence their corporate image. Watanabe also hesitated to develop it in the device division instead of the computer division, but he saw the burgeoning personal computer market in America, and then he decided to continue the project. As the project progressed, Watanabe, Sawanobori and Ouchi discussed their thoughts about marketing, planned a method for mass production, and reached an agreement they devoted all their energies to the project. In January 1979, Goto submitted the first mass production request to New Nippon Electric. They were sure the product would sell, but planned to educate and increase dealers little by little.

=== Success in Japan ===
Advert in ASCII June 1979. "A dramatic story with the computer will begin. The Personal Computer comes out from NEC."

The PC-8001 was introduced on May 9, 1979, and its prototype went to the public at the Microcomputer Show '79 (マイクロコンピュータショウ'79) held from May 16 to 19 at the Tokyo Ryūtsū Center. Soon after the exposition, NEC received thousands of orders. It took half a year to ship about 10,000 backorders after shipment began on September 20, 1979. By 1981, it dominated 40% of the Japanese personal computer market. About 250,000 units were shipped until production stopped in January 1983. NEC also succeeded in expanding their personal computer chain in Japan. The chain owned 7 stores in 1979, 15 stores in 1980, more than 100 stores in 1981, and reached 200 stores by 1983.

The PC-8001 sold well in the educational market because NEC advertised that the PC-8001 used the industrial standard of Microsoft BASIC. Kanagawa Prefectural Chigasaki Nishihama High School was the first futsu-ka school (upper secondary schools with a focus on a common course) to purchase PC-8001 computers (buying 17 units) and started teaching programming as an elective subject in 1981. In April 1982, NHK Educational TV started the television program "Interest course 'Introduction to Microcomputers' (趣味講座「マイコン入門」)" using the PC-8001. Its textbook "Introduction to Microcomputers - the first half of Showa 57 (マイコン入門 昭和57年度 前期)" sold 700,000 copies.

== PC-8001mkII ==
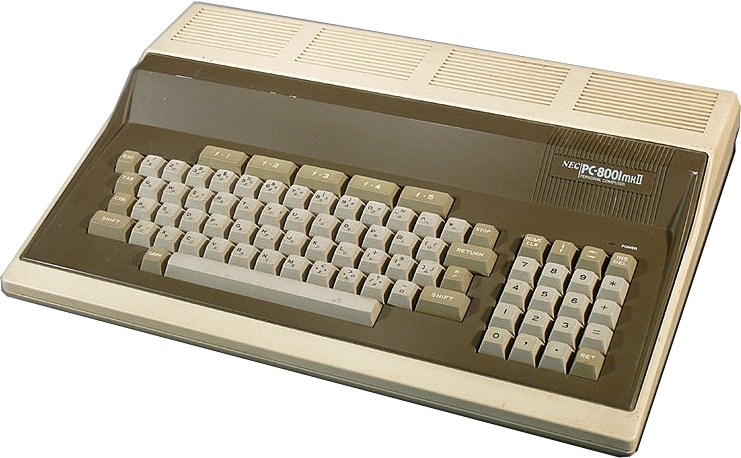
PC-8001mkII, released in Japan in 1983

A higher-performance, more graphically capable revision of the PC-8001, the Mark II debuted in March 1983 for a price of 123,000 yen.

While its most obvious improvement was in its graphical capabilities, the Mark II also included an internal 5.25" floppy disk interface as well as two internal expansion slots, doing away with the need for an "expansion box" to permit upgrades. The internal BASIC was changed as well, from the 24 KB N-BASIC to a 32 KB "N80-BASIC" that added new conditional statements as well as graphics commands.

While the price of the PC-8001mkII was comparable with other 8-bit computer offerings at the time, its graphics were notably worse than its competitors (most likely an attempt on NEC's part to avoid competing with their own, higher-powered PC-8800 series). This led to a relative dearth of software produced for it, particularly games.

== PC-8001mkIISR ==
A games-oriented revision of the PC-8001mkII with significantly better graphics and sound, making its debut in January 1985 for 108,000 yen.

The mkIISR increased the frame-buffer memory from 16 kB to 48 kB, allowing for 640×200-pixel graphics or 320×200-pixel double-buffered graphics modes. Additionally, the primitive PC speaker was replaced by an FM synthesis audio system. Its internal BASIC was also updated to allow usage of this new hardware, as well as providing mkII and PC-8001 compatibility modes (although a significant proportion of older software would not run properly under these modes). Other changes included the change of one general-purpose expansion slot to a Kanji character ROM expansion slot, a PC-8800 series keyboard connector, and an Atari-style joystick connector.

== Reception ==
The Japanese personal computer magazine ASCII concluded in 1979 that "Although some problems remain, at present, we can guarantee it is the strongest machine for both software and hardware."

Sawanobori recalled why the PC-8001 became a long seller that "The biggest factor is the price setting of 168,000 yen. The major opinion insisted 220,000 to 230,000 yen was appropriate for value of the product, but Kazuya Watanabe never withdrew 168,000 yen. After all, Watanabe's proposal was accepted by the executive director Ouchi's decision, but his stubbornness was admirable."

Although handicapped by the lack of English documentation, BYTE's American reviewers concluded in January 1981 after evaluating a unit purchased in Japan that "the PC-8001 appears to be an attractive, well-planned, and well-made personal computer ... Most people who have seen our PC-8001 feel that, if it were sold in our country, it would provide strong competition for any of the color-based home computers currently being sold". While evaluating the US market-localized version of the PC-8001 in May 1982, the authors said that the original PC-8001 had functioned reliably for one and one half years. They criticized the quality and comprehensiveness of the English-language documentation.

Preceded by COMPO BS/80	NEC Personal Computers	Succeeded by NEC PC-6001; NEC PC-8801
