= Ollie's Follies =

1984 video game

- Developer: Fanda
- Publishers: Access Software; Americana
- Designer: Frank Cohen
- Platforms: Atari 8-bit, Commodore 64
- Release: 1984
- Genre: Platform

Ollie's Follies is a platform game designed by Frank Cohen and published in 1984 by Americana for Atari 8-bit computers and Commodore 64.

== Gameplay ==
Gameplay screenshot (Atari 8-bit)

The object of the game is to guide the titular "Ollie" through a series of increasingly difficult levels. In each room, the player must make his way through a series of platforms and ramps to an exit that leads to another screen. Some platforms are patrolled by robots, and if Ollie touches one of them, he loses his life. There are energizers scattered throughout the room, which give Ollie the power to touch and destroy robots with impunity.

The screens become increasingly difficult with additional hazards and features. There are large fans that cause Ollie to get blown off ramps, sliding ledges, trampolines, teleports and laser walls. There are a total of 24 rooms. The player wins by getting Ollie through all of them.

== Reception ==
Ollie's Follies was met with fairly good reviews. Zzap!64 reviewers were "pleasantly surprised to find that Ollie’s Follies isn't all that bad", and rated it "Oldie, but goodie platform game". Electronic Games reviewer noted that "Ollie's Follies is a very good game", but he also expressed doubts about how the game would fare in the crowded platform game market. Bob Chappell writing for Atari User concluded: "Ollie's Follies is very enjoyable and likely to keep you coming back for more until you've cracked it. At the low price it's too good a bargain to miss."

== See also ==
Other games written by Frank Cohen:

- Clowns and Balloons (1982)
- Cohen's Towers (1983)
- Ghost Chaser (1984)
- The Scrolls of Abadon (1984)
