= Black Magic (video game) =

1987 action-adventure video game

- Developer: Action Software
- Publishers: Datasoft; U.S. Gold (UK)
- Designer: Peter Ward
- Platforms: Amstrad CPC, Apple II, Commodore 64, ZX Spectrum
- Release: 1987
- Genre: Action-adventure
- Mode: Single-player

Black Magic is a multidirectional scrolling action-adventure game written for the Apple II by Peter Ward of Action Software and published by Datasoft in 1987. Commodore 64, ZX Spectrum, and Amstrad CPC versions were also released.

== Plot ==
The evil wizard Zahgrim has turned the good wizard Aganar to stone, removed his six eyes, and scattered them across the world, though always in the same locations, so they may view the destruction being reaped. The player's objective is to find the six eyeballs.

== Gameplay ==
The player moves through a large, vertically and horizontally scrolling world, picking up food, arrows, and spells. Roaming enemies can be avoided or shot with arrows; the player can only shoot arrows while moving. The game plays differently depending on the order the eyes are recovered. When one is collected, stronger types of monsters appear in the world and travel becomes more difficult.

Resources are limited. Food is always on the verge of running out and arrows are in short supply. A large bird can carry the player to a different part of the world, similar to the bat in Adventure for the Atari 2600. Shooting the bird with an arrow makes it go away temporarily.

Spells are gained by collecting scrolls. They provide alternate approaches to problems. For example, Vanish prevents damage from monsters and casting Chill on water immobilizes the creatures and allows the frozen surface to be walked across. The player's rank begins at apprentice and every 4000 points a new rank is awarded: wizard, sorcerer, and necromancer. New spells are unlocked with each rank.

Once all six eyes have been found and placed in the Blind Statue's empty sockets, a message appears explaining how to end Zahgrim's rule over the land once and for all. The player is then able to enter Zahgrim's castle, a difficult maze of traps and monsters.

== Reception ==
The game was reviewed in 1987 in Dragon #124 by Hartley and Patricia Lesser in "The Role of Computers" column. The reviewers called it one of the better games in the arcade/adventure genre, due to its variety of tasks required to complete the quest.
