= Rosen's Brigade =

1983 video game

- Publisher: Datasoft / Gentry Software
- Designer: Ron Rosen
- Platform: Atari 8-bit
- Release: 1983
- Genre: Scrolling shooter

Rosen's Brigade (shown on the loading screen without the apostrophe) is a horizontally scrolling shooter written by Ron Rosen for Atari 8-bit computers and published in 1983 by Gentry Software, a budget label of Datasoft. The player flies a fighter jet over a landscape, rescuing paratroopers falling from the top of the screen, and shooting enemy air and ground vehicles.

This is one of two games from Datasoft where the designer's name is part of the title. The other is O'Riley's Mine by Mark Riley.

== Gameplay ==
The player flies a fighter jet left and right over a horizontally scrolling landscape of desert terrain and water. Shooting and destroying all enemy forces ends the level. Initially the attackers are planes and helicopters, then tanks appear on the ground and ships in the water. Parachutists (the term used in the manual) fall from the top of the screen and can be rescued for points by flying over them. A mini-map shows the entire play area. Unlike similar scrolling shooters, such as Defender and its many clones, when the plane moves vertically it points in the direction of motion instead of remaining parallel to the ground.

== Reception ==
A 1984 review in Video Games magazine concluded, "Although Rosen's Brigade isn't going to be an earthshaker, it's a fun game with rapidly increasing difficulty levels. And it is rather habit forming." Doug Stead, writing for ROM magazine, was enthusiastic about the controls and explosion effects, but didn't like that all enemies give the same number of points, regardless of how difficult they are to kill. He also experienced some technical problems, such as the game slowing down and even locking up after a while.

== See also ==
Other games by Ron Rosen:

- Pacific Coast Highway
- Mr. Robot and His Robot Factory
- Nuclear Nick
