= Alternate Reality: The City =

1985 video game

- Developer: Paradise Programming
- Publisher: Datasoft
- Designer: Philip Price
- Composer: Gary Gilbertson
- Platforms: Atari 8-bit, Commodore 64, Apple II, Mac, Atari ST, Amiga, MS-DOS, TRS-80 Color Computer
- Release: 1985
- Genre: Role-playing
- Mode: Single-player

Alternate Reality: The City is a video game published by Datasoft, the first game in the Alternate Reality series. It was created by Philip Price and was released in 1985 for a variety of systems. Gary Gilbertson created the music.

== Technology ==
The game requires a blank, formatted disk to use as a "Character Disk" in order to save the game.

== Reception ==
Scorpia gave Alternate Reality: The City a mixed review in Computer Gaming World. The graphics were praised for its attention to detail, as was the expansive city to explore. She criticized the game, however, for having no goal; once the city is painfully mapped out, the only thing left to do is monotonously battle enemies in preparation for The Dungeon. The 8-bit versions omitted certain features such as joining guilds, and Scorpia criticized the Apple version's poor graphics. In 1993 Scorpia called The City "a fascinating premise that turned out rather poorly ... a game for those with great persistence and patience".

Alternate Reality: The City received a mini-review in 1988 in Dragon #131 by Hartley, Patricia, and Kirk Lesser in "The Role of Computers" column. The reviewers gave the Macintosh version of the game 3 out of 5 stars, and the Atari ST version 3 stars. Alternate Reality: The City and Alternate Reality: The Dungeon were both the subject of the feature review Dragon #135. The reviewers gave Alternate Reality: The City 3 stars, and Alternate Reality: The Dungeon 2 1/2 stars.
