= O'Riley's Mine =

1983 video game

- Publisher: Datasoft
- Designer: Mark Riley
- Programmers: Atari 8-bit Mark Riley; Apple II; Larry Lewis; Commodore 64; Al Rubin
- Platforms: Apple II, Atari 8-bit, Commodore 64
- Release: 1983
- Genre: Action

O'Riley's Mine is an action game designed by Mark Riley and published in 1983 by Datasoft for Atari 8-bit computers. The game was ported to the Apple II by Larry Lewis and Commodore 64 by Al Rubin. Both ports were also released in 1983.

This is one of two games from Datasoft where the designer's name is part of the title. The other is Rosen's Brigade by Ron Rosen.

== Gameplay ==
Gameplay screenshot (Atari 8-bit)

O'Riley must travel through his mine to capture all the buried treasure and return safely home again at the top of the mine shaft. He can be drowned by the onrushing water or eaten by the river monsters. Dynamite charges can be used to block the monsters' pathway, but it will be cleared again by the incoming water. Explosions can be timed so that a monster is blown away to gain extra points. The number of dynamite charges is dependent on the level of difficulty.

There is no time limit, but the speed of water increases in higher levels. When the moon rises the monsters move faster through the mine shafts. The oncoming water rises to the highest level the player digs in the mine, so it is possible the water will block the player from returning home.

There are 6 types of treasure to collect, 4 of which come in small and large versions.

== Reception ==
Softline reviewed O'Riley's Mine positively in September–October issue of 1983: "The graphics display is full of color, the mountains and multicolored mine shaft are particularly well done, and the play of the game, within its scope, is excellent." The Addison-Wesley Book of Atari Software 1984 gave the game an overall weak rating (D+) and didn't like the price: "Despite its simplicity, it might be worth looking at, but not at $29.95."

Computer and Video Games, reviewing the Commodore 64 version, praised the graphics and called the water sounds "quite realistic". While they called the game "very playable" and "quite fun", they also felt it lacked challenge, calling the early levels "quite easy" and stating they "wouldn't imagine it taking too long to complete the game". Joaquin Boaz, writing for InfoWorld, drew comparisons between the Atari arcade game Dig Dug and stated O'Riley's Mine, "makes excellent use of both water and the fear of it." Boaz also noted the package's inclusion of both a floppy disk and a cassette tape as "a nice touch".

== See also ==
- Boulders and Bombs
- Chopper Hunt
