= Napoleon in Russia: Borodino 1812 =

1987 video game

- Developer(s): Steve Krenek
- Publisher(s): Krentek Software
- Platform(s): Atari 8-bit, Commodore 64, MS-DOS
- Release: 1987
- Genre(s): Turn-based strategy

Napoleon in Russia: Borodino 1812 is a computer wargame written by Steve Krenek for the Atari 8-bit computers and published by Krentek Software in 1987.

== Gameplay ==
Napoleon in Russia: Borodino 1812 is a game in which the Battle of Borodino is simulated.

== Reception ==
Computer Gaming World described Borodino as "a welcome contribution to a much neglected, at least in computer games, era of warfare". M. Evan Brooks's full review stated that "Borodino is a solid effort. While it does not forge a breakthrough in game development, it is easy to learn, valid historically and entertaining. For those desirous of learning about Napoleonic warfare, it is recommended".
