= NEC μCOM series =

Series of microprocessors and microcontrollers

The NEC μCOM series is a series of microprocessors and microcontrollers manufactured by NEC in the 1970s and 1980s. The initial entries in the series were custom-designed 4 and 16-bit designs, but later models in the series were mostly based on the Intel 8080 and Zilog Z80 8-bit designs, and later, the Intel 8086 16-bit design. Most of the line was replaced in 1984 by the NEC V20, an Intel 8088 clone.

== Overview ==
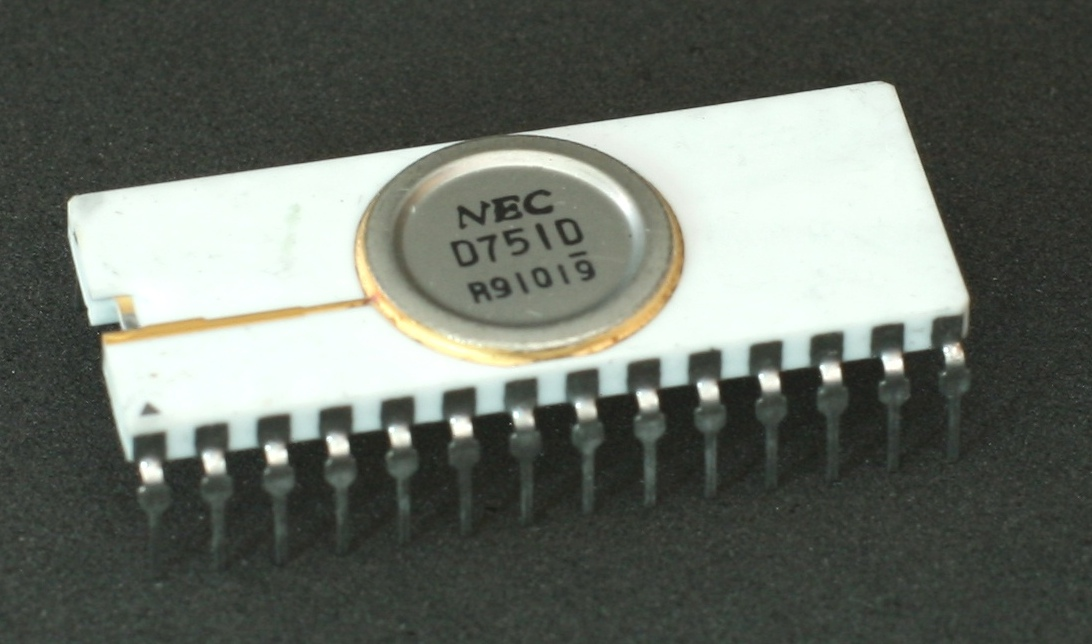
μCOM-4: μPD751

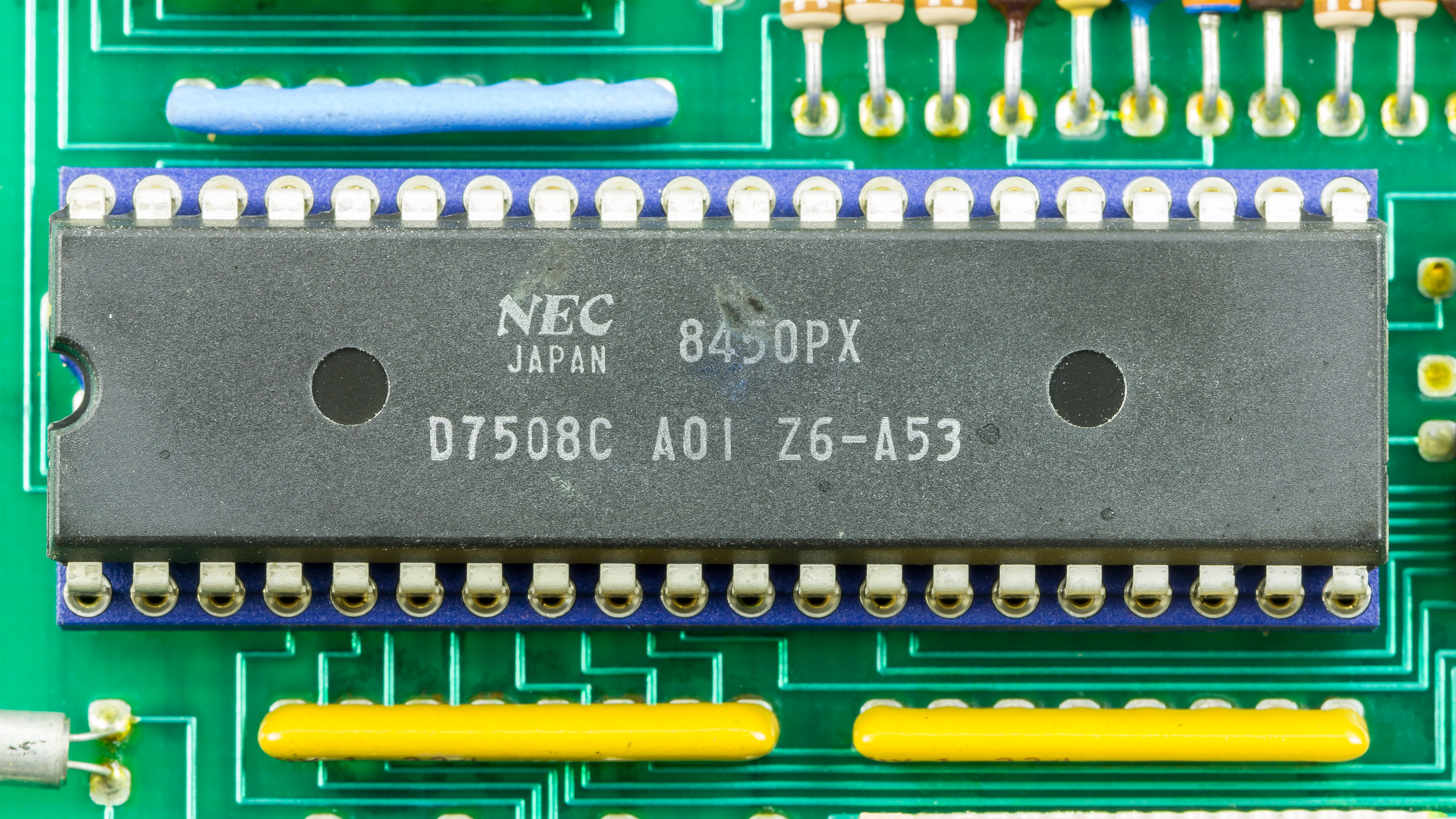
μCOM-75: μPD7508

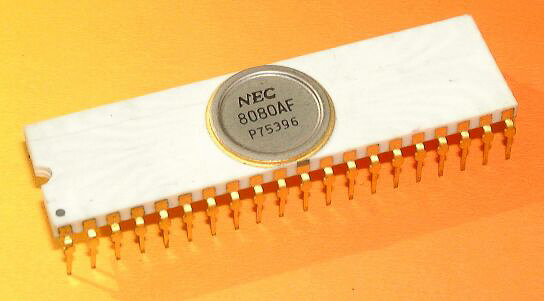
μCOM-80F: μPD8080AF

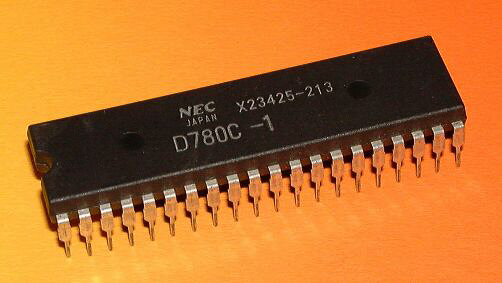
μCOM-82: μPD780C-1

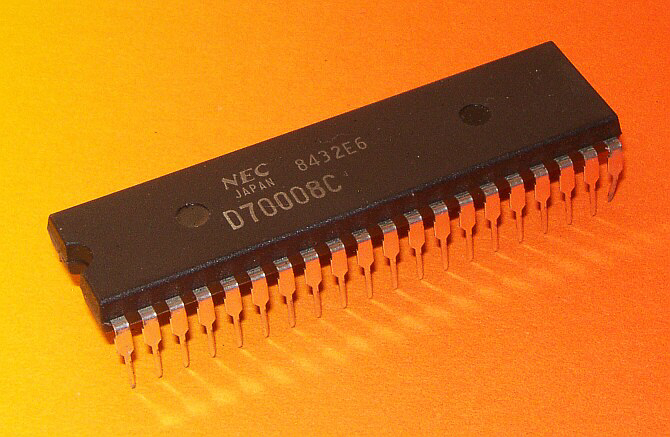
μCOM-82: μPD70008

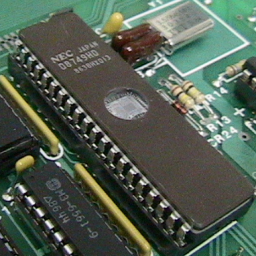
μCOM-84: μPD8749

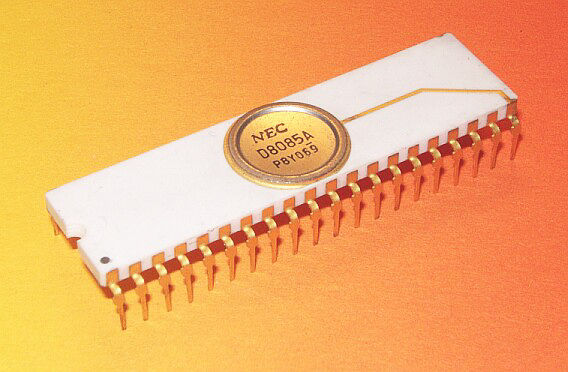
μCOM-85: μPD8085

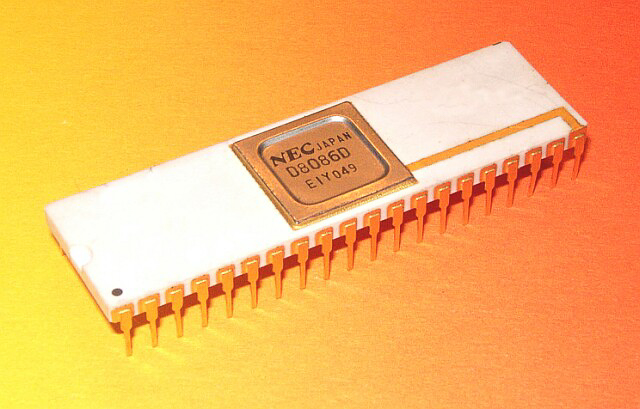
μCOM-86: μPD8086

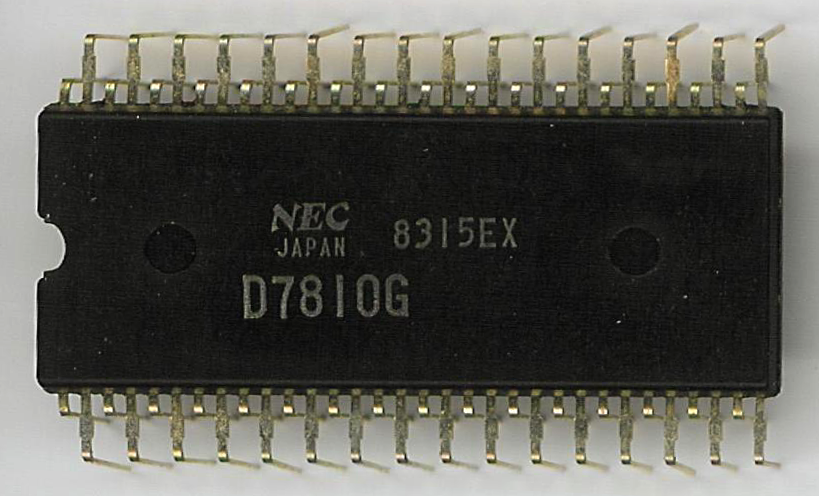
μCOM-87AD: μPD7810

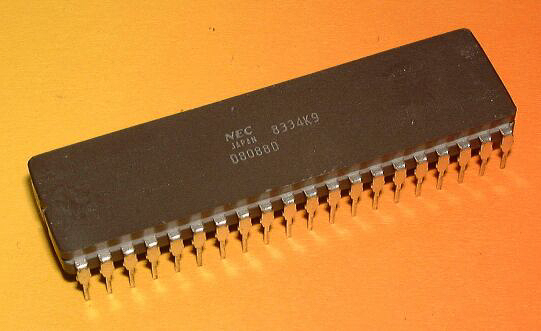
μCOM-88: μPD8088

The μCOM series has its roots in one of the world's earliest microprocessor chipsets, the two-chip processor μPD707 / μPD708. Early in 1970, Coca Cola Japan set out to increase the efficiency of their sales outlets by introducing new POS terminals. Sharp was contracted to build these terminals, and NEC in turn to develop a chipset. The chipset development was complete in December 1971, at about the same time as other early microprocessors in the USA.

Since then, NEC has developed and manufactured various microprocessors and microcontrollers. General-purpose products among them were given series names starting with μCOM. The μCOM-4 series (4 bit) and μCOM-16 series (16 bit) were original developments, while the μCOM-8 series (8 bit and 16 bit) consisted mostly of Intel- and Zilog-compatible microprocessors.

The μCOM name disappeared when the V series and 78K series appeared in the 1980s, and the μCOM-87AD series, for example, came to be described simply as the 87AD series.

== μCOM-4 series ==
=== μCOM-4 ===
The μCOM-4 (μPD751) is NEC's original single-chip 4-bit microprocessor, announced in 1973. Unlike the Intel 4040, the μPD751 has separate data and address buses. A number of peripheral integrated circuits were provided for the μPD751:

- μPD752 - 8-bit I/O port
- μPD757 - Keyboard and display controller
- μPD758 - Printer controller

=== μCOM-41 ===
The μCOM-41 (μPD541) is a PMOS microprocessor in a 42-pin package. The following peripheral integrated circuits were available:

- μPD542 - ROM plus RAM
- μPD543 - ROM plus I/O port

=== μCOM-42 ===
The μCOM-42 (μPD548) is a 4-bit PMOS microcontroller in a 42-pin package. It has built-in ROM (1920 × 10 bit) and RAM (96 × 4 bit) as well as keyboard, display, and printer controllers. The μPD548 requires a power supply of -10V and the outputs can switch up to -35V. A ROM-less chip (μPD555) in a 64-pin quad-in-line package was available for hardware and software development.

=== μCOM-43 through μCOM-46 ===
The μCOM-43 series consists of more than 10 different 4-bit microcontrollers. Broadly speaking, there are PMOS devices (μPD500 series), NMOS devices (μPD1500 series, μCOM-43N ), and CMOS devices (μPD650 series, μCOM-43C ). The μCOM-43, μCOM-44, μCOM-45, and μCOM-46 have the same basic instruction set. They differ in the amount of ROM and RAM, the number of I/O pins, and the package (28-pin or 42-pin). A ROM-less chip (μPD556) in a 64-pin quad-in-line package was available for hardware and software development. Beginning in 1980, they there were gradually replaced by the μCOM-75 series (see below).

=== μCOM-47 ===
The μCOM-47 (μPD766) is a 4-bit NMOS microcontroller in a 64-pin package. It has built-in ROM and RAM as well as keyboard, display, and printer controllers.

=== μCOM-75 ===
The μCOM-75 series consists of 4-bit microcontrollers. Only the first device in the series, the μPD7520, was still developed in PMOS technology. All subsequent microcontrollers in the series (μPD7502 etc.) used CMOS. A ROM-less chip (μPD7500) in a 64-pin quad-in-line package was available for hardware and software development. By 1982 the μCOM-75 series was referred to as the μPD7500 series and later replaced by the 75X and 75XL series.

== μCOM-8 series ==
=== μCOM-8 ===
The μCOM-8 (μPD753) is an 8-bit microprocessor that is software-compatible with the Intel 8080, but differs in its 42-pin package and its completely different pin-out. There are minor software differences as well, e.g. the setting of flags for the SUB instruction.

=== μCOM-80 ===
The μCOM-80 (μPD8080A) is an 8-bit microprocessor that is pin-compatible with the Intel 8080 and software-compatible with the μCOM-8. That is, the μPD8080A has some improvements compared to the Intel 8080:

- BCD arithmetic is supported for both addition and subtraction (Intel 8080: addition only). Similar to the N flag in the Zilog Z80, the μPD8080A has a SUB flag (bit 5 of the flag register) to indicate that a subtraction was performed.
- The MOV r,r instruction requires 4 clock cycles (Intel 8080: 5 clock cycles). SPHL and XTHL also executes one cycle faster than Intel 8080 but DAD executes one cycle slower.
- 3-byte instructions are allowed in an interrupt acknowledge cycle, so a CALL instruction to any memory address can be used (Intel 8080: only 1-byte RST instructions are allowed).

Unfortunately, these improvements cause some programs written for the Intel 8080 not to run correctly. To overcome this problem, NEC introduced the μCOM-80F (μPD8080AF) which is completely compatible with the Intel 8080 in all details. The 1979 catalog no longer listed the improved μPD8080A. With the TK-80, NEC offered a development board for μCOM-80, which due to its low price became popular with hobbyists.

=== μCOM-82 ===
The μCOM-82 (μPD780) is an 8-bit microprocessor compatible with the Zilog Z80. The μPD780C corresponds to the original Z80 (max. 2.5 MHz clock), while the μPD780C-1 corresponds to the Z80A (max. 4 MHz clock) and the μPD780C-2 to the Z80B (max. 6 MHz clock). The μPD780C-1 was used in Sinclair's ZX80, ZX81 and early versions of the ZX Spectrum, in several MSX and NEC (PC-6000, PC-8000, PC-8800) computers, in musical synthesizers such as Oberheim OB-8, and in Sega's SG-1000 game console.

A CMOS version (μPD70008) followed later.

=== μCOM-84 ===
The μCOM-84 (μPD8048 etc.) is compatible with Intel's 8-bit microcontroller 8048. CMOS microcontrollers up to μPD80C50 followed, but an Intel 8051 compatible product, which is the 8-bit industry standard, was never offered.

=== μCOM-85 ===
The μCOM-85 (μPD8085) is an Intel 8085 compatible 8-bit microprocessor.

=== μCOM-86, μCOM-88 ===
The μCOM-86 (μPD8086) and μCOM-88 (μPD8088) are Intel 8086 and Intel 8088 compatible 16-bit microprocessors. They were superseded by the V series.

=== μCOM-87, μCOM-87AD ===
The μCOM-87 (μPD7800 etc.) and μCOM-87AD (μPD7810 etc.) are NEC original 8-bit microcontrollers. The μCOM-87AD adds an A/D converter to the μCOM-87. The register configuration consists of two sets of 8 registers each (A, V, B, C, D, E, H, L). The V register is a vector register that stores the upper 8 bits of the address of the working memory area, and the short address space which is fixed in the current 78K series can be freely arranged. The μPD7805 and μPD7806 have only one set of 7 registers (no V register). In the μPD7807 and later, the ALU is expanded to 16 bit and an EA register is added for 16-bit operation.

The series came in 64-pin quad in-line package. This series was superseded by the 78K series.

== μCOM-16 series ==
=== μCOM-16 ===
The μCOM-16 is a NEC original 16-bit microprocessor, implemented in two chips, the μPD755 (register + ALU) and μPD756 (controller), in 1974.

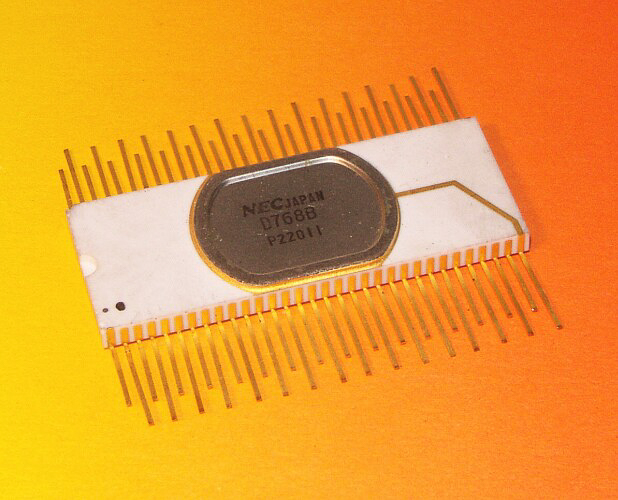
μCOM-1600: μPD768

=== μCOM-1600 ===
The μCOM-1600 (μPD768) is a NEC original single-chip 16-bit microprocessor that was announced in 1978.

The processor has 93 basic instructions, consisting of 1 to 3 16-bit words. The memory space of 1 Mbyte (512K words) is byte-addressable. The I/O address space is 2048 bytes. There are 14 general-purpose registers. The processor has a 2-input vector interrupt, DMA control, refresh control for DRAM, and a master/slave mode to enable multiprocessor operation.
