= Pacific Coast Highway (video game) =

1982 video game

- Developer: Datasoft
- Publisher: Datasoft
- Programmer: Ron Rosen
- Platform: Atari 8-bit
- Release: 1982
- Genre: Action
- Modes: Single-player, multiplayer

Pacific Coast Highway (stylized as Pacific Coast Hwy) is an action video game written by Ron Rosen for Atari 8-bit computers and published by Datasoft in 1982. It is a clone of Frogger, where the objective is to cross from the bottom of the screen to the top. The key differences are that in Pacific Coast Highway the road and water segments are split into separate, alternating, screens and an option for two-player simultaneous play. If either player dies, the level starts over.

Ron Rosen later wrote the scrolling shooter Rosen's Brigade and the platform game Mr. Robot and His Robot Factory, both released in 1983.

== Gameplay ==
The highway screen with the rolling sidewalk shown in gray.

Each player starts at the bottom of the screen and the goal is to reach the top. Player one is a rabbit and player two, if present, is a tortoise. The difference between the two is entirely visual, and the tortoise and hare theme is not present elsewhere.

The first screen is the highway from the title, with eight lanes of traffic to avoid, divided in the center by a median strip (called a "rolling sidewalk" in the manual). The second screen is water-themed, and players must hop on the boats and rafts to reach the top. The median strip equivalent for the water is a row of connected life preservers. In later levels the median strip and life preservers move, first in one direction only, then randomly switching. Getting hit by a vehicle results in an ambulance taking the character away (or a rescue boat for the water sequence), and the level restarts for both players.

The manual describes the second screen as crossing a beach of hot sand by jumping on towels and surfboards, but this isn't present in the game itself.

== Reception ==
COMPUTE! editorial assistant Charles Brannon wrote, "A frustrating aspect of the game is that if one player gets hit (or takes a plunge), both players have to start over."

In a C+ review for The Book of Atari Software 1983 the reviewer wrote, "The graphics and sound are fair in this game; but although it offers something of a challenge to the uninitiated, it cannot lay claim to originality."

== See also ==
- Preppie!
- Frogger II: ThreeeDeep!
