= PC-6000 series =

1981 NEC Corporation home computer series

NEC PC-6001
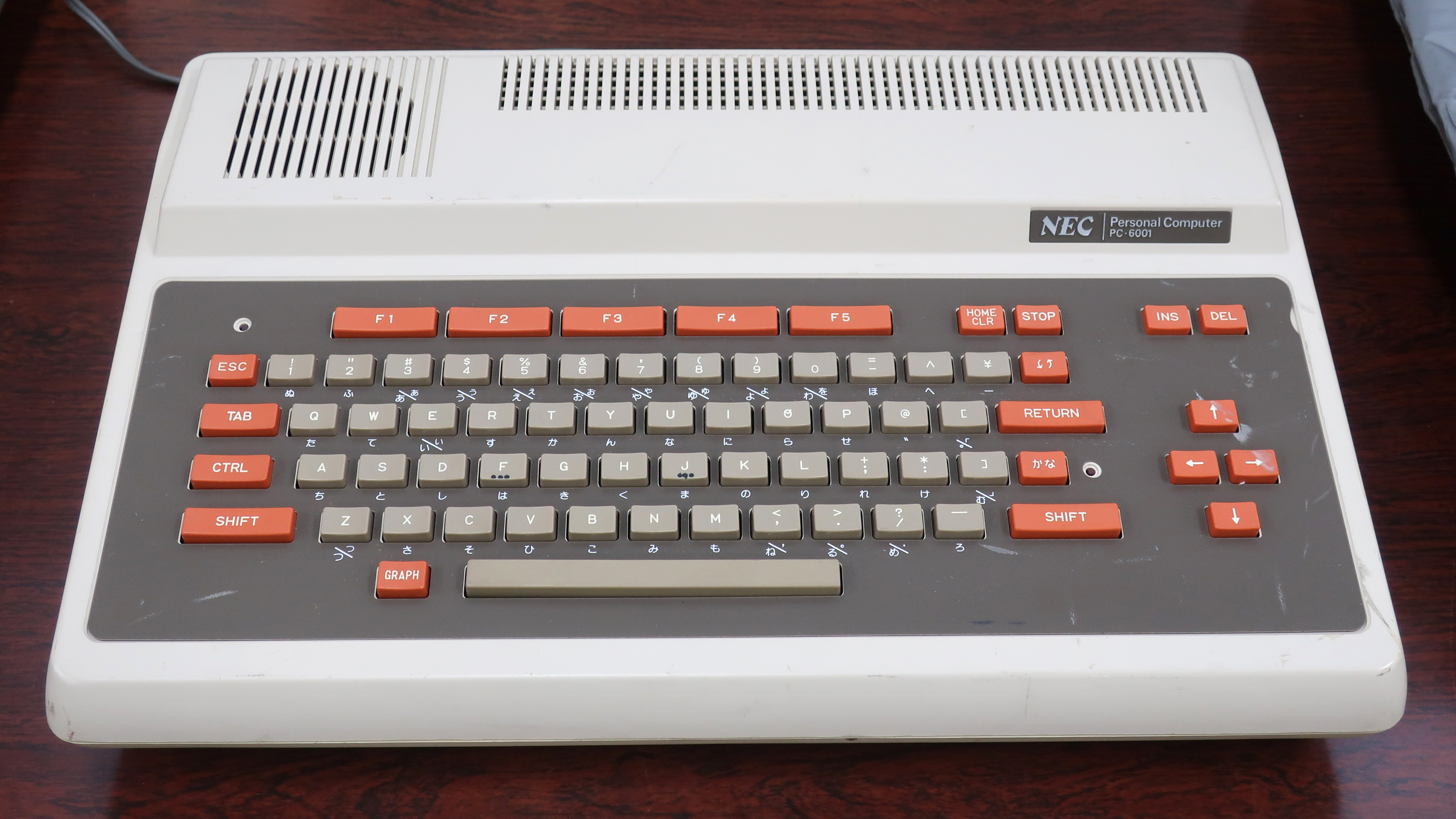
- PC-6001
- Manufacturer: NEC Home Electronics
- Type: Home computer
- Released: November 1981; 44 years ago
- Introductory price: ¥89,800
- Units sold: 150,000 (PC-6001)
- Media: ROM Cartridge, Compact Cassette
- CPU: Zilog Z80-compatible NEC μPD780C-1 clocked at 3.8 MHz
- Memory: 16-32 KB RAM, 20 KB ROM
- Display: 256×192 (monochrome), 128×192 (2 colors), 64×48 (9 colors), 256×128, 128×128
- Graphics: M5C6847P-1 (MC6847 clone)
- Input: Keyboard
- Predecessor: NEC PC-8000
- Successor: NEC PC-6601; NEC PC-8801

The PC-6000 series is a series of 8-bit home computers introduced in November 1981 by NEC Home Electronics. There are several models in this series, such as the PC-6001, the PC-6001 MK2 and the PC-6001 MK2 SR. There is also an American version, called the NEC TREK or NEC PC-6001A.

Several peripherals were available for the system in North America, including an expander with three cartridge ports (some of the cartridge-based games used two cartridges), a cassette-tape recorder, a 5.25" floppy disk drive, a printer, and a touchpad.

The PC-6000 series were followed by the PC-6600 series.

== Development ==
New Nippon Electric (新日本電気, Shin Nippon Denki) was a subsidiary of NEC and a manufacturer of consumer electronics. They manufactured the PC-8001 and its peripherals, which were successful and grew the personal computer market in Japan.

Subsequently, they started developing a low-cost home computer, which was released as PC-6001. At the same time, NEC's Electronic Devices Group developed the PC-8801 for home and business, and the Information Processing Group developed the PC-9801 for the business market.

In 1983, New Nippon Electric changed its name to NEC Home Electronics. At that time, NEC had four personal computer lines being developed by separate teams. To avoid conflict, they decided to consolidate their personal computer business into two divisions; NEC Home Electronics dealt with the 8-bit home computer lines, and the Information Processing Group dealt with the 16-bit personal computer line.

NEC Home Electronics discontinued development of the PC-6000 series, the PC-6600 series, and the PC-8000 series in favor of the PC-8800 series.

== PC-6001 ==
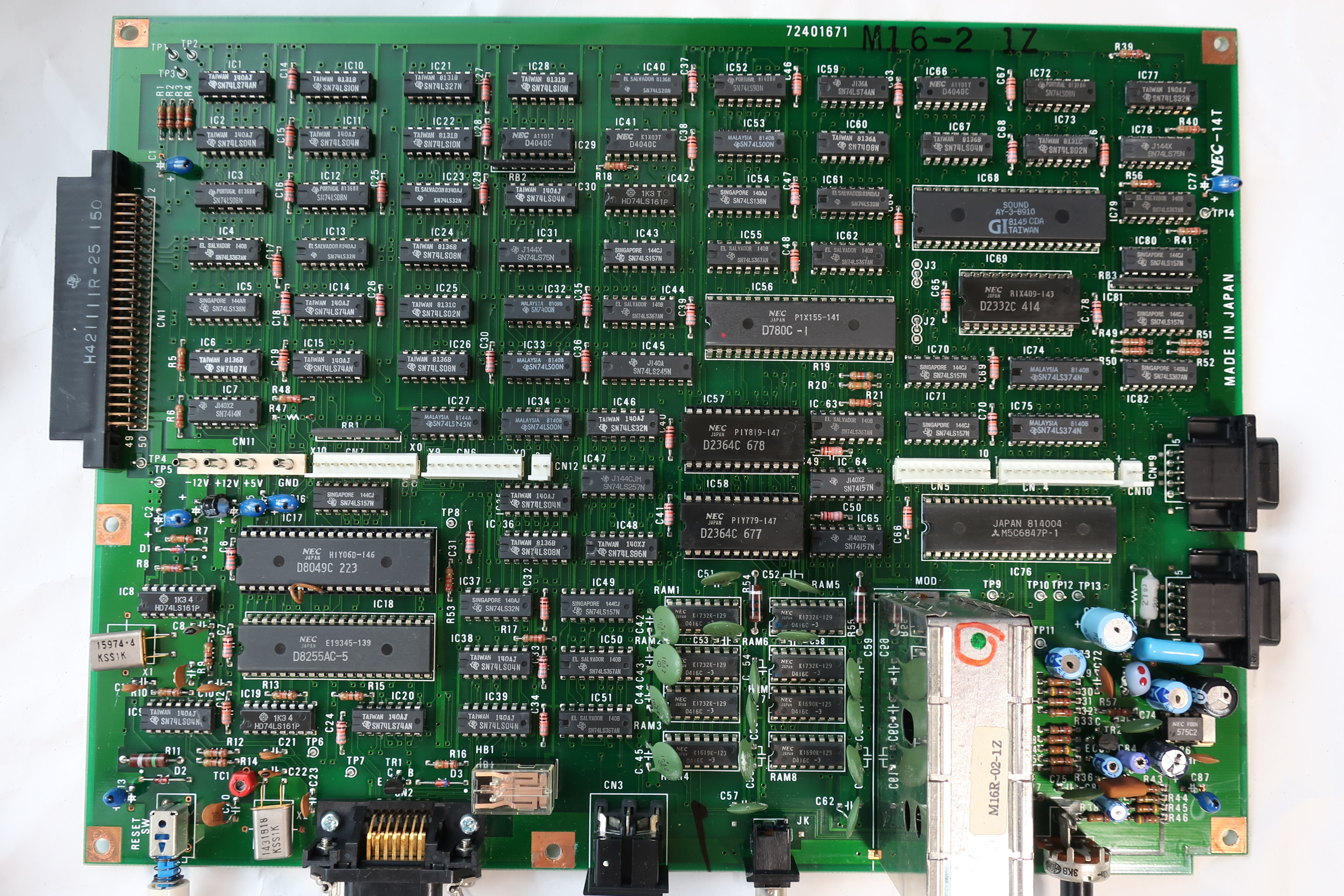
PC-6001 motherboard

The PC-6001 has a μPD780 processor (a NEC clone of the Zilog Z80), 16 KB RAM (up to 32 KB), a General Instrument AY-3-8910 3-voice sound generator, a ROM Cartridge connector, a cassette tape interface, 2 joystick ports, a parallel printer connector, an RF modulator output and a composite video output. ROM cartridges allowed the user to easily use software such as video games.

It supports four screen modes; 32x16 characters with 4 colors, 64x48 pixel graphics with 9 colors, 128x192 graphics with 4 colors, and 256x192 graphics with 2 colors.

The Japanese version uses a chiclet keyboard while a North American version uses a typewriter keyboard.

== PC-6001 MK2 ==
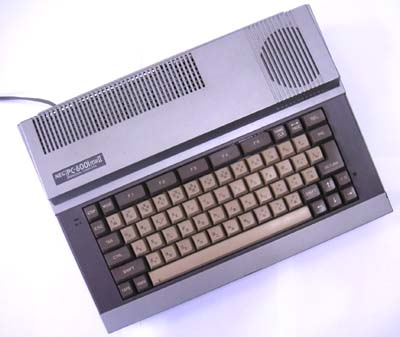
PC-6001 MK2

The PC-6001 MK2 has 64 KB memory, 16 KB video RAM, a 5 1/4-inch double-density floppy drive interface, a Kanji character generator, a RGB monitor out, speech synthesizer unit and a typewriter keyboard.

It supports following screen modes: 40x20 characters, 80x40 pixel graphics with 15 colors, 160x200 graphics with 15 colors, and 320x200 graphics with 4 colors.
