= Timeslip (disambiguation) =

Timeslip may refer to:

- Time slip, plot device used in fiction in which a person can travel in time
- Time slip recording, a feature of some digital video recorders allowing earlier parts of a program to be viewed while later parts are being recorded
- Timeslip, in drag racing, a record of the vehicle's elapsed time, top speed, and the driver's reaction time
- Time slip, a name given by paranormal investigators to an alleged time travel

== Popular culture ==
- Timeslip, a 1970-1 British science fiction television series
- Timeslip (1955 film), a science fiction film starring Gene Nelson and Faith Domergue
- Timeslip, a novel based on the 1966-7 television series The Time Tunnel
- "Timeslip", a 1979 short story by Colin Wilson
- Timeslip (comics), a Marvel Comics superhero
- In Kim Stanley Robinson's Mars Trilogy, 39.5 minutes after midnight during which clocks pause in the adjusted 24-hour Martian day
- Timeslip (video game), an Atari and Commodore video game
- Time Slip, a Super Nintendo Entertainment System video game
- G.I. Samurai (also known as Time Slip--Sengoku jieitai), a 1979 Japanese science fiction film starring Sonny Chiba
- Time Slip (album), a 2019 studio album by Super Junior
- Time-Slip, a 1986 novel by Graham Dunstan Martin

== See also ==
- Martian Time-Slip, a 1964 science fiction novel by Philip K. Dick
