= English Software =

Video game developer and publisher

The English Software Company
- Industry: video game industry
- Founded: 1982
- Defunct: 1987
- Headquarters: Manchester, UK
- Products: Video games

The English Software Company, later shortened to English Software, was a Manchester, UK-based video game developer and publisher that operated from 1982 until 1987. Starting with its first release, the horizontally scrolling shooter Airstrike, English Software focused on Atari 8-bit computers of home, then expanded to other platforms. The company used the slogan "The power of excitement".

== History ==
The company was set up in 1982 by Philip Morris, owner of the Gemini Electronics computer store in Manchester, to release video games for the Atari 8-bit computers. By the end of 1983, English Software was the largest producer of Atari 8-bit software in the UK and Morris closed Gemini Electronics to concentrate on English Software.

The company continued to concentrate on the Atari 8-bit market but also released games for other home computers including Commodore 64, BBC Micro, Acorn Electron, Amstrad CPC, ZX Spectrum, Atari ST, and Amiga.

Popular games include platformers Jet-Boot Jack (1983) and Henry's House (1984), racer Elektra Glide (1985), the multi-event Knight Games (1986) and shoot 'em up Leviathan (1987).

English had licensing deals that saw some of their games released internationally e.g. through Dynamics Marketing in Germany and Datamost in the US. A number of English's games were sold at budget price by Mastertronic in the US, which included exclusive ports such as the Atari version of Henry's House and the IBM PC compatible version of Knight Games. Philip Morris said in 2013 that he did not license the Atari version to Mastertronic UK, even though English Software had the option to do this.

== Games ==
=== 1982 ===
- Airstrike (Atari 8-bit)
- Time Warp (Atari 8-bit)
- Venus Voyager (Atari 8-bit)

=== 1983 ===
- Airstrike II (Atari 8-bit)
- Batty Builders (Atari 8-bit)
- Bombastic! (Atari 8-bit) aka Bomb Blast It!
- Captain Sticky's Gold (Atari 8-bit)
- Cave Runner (Atari 8-bit)
- Diamonds (Atari 8-bit)
- Firefleet (Atari 8-bit)
- Hyperblast! (Atari 8-bit)
- Jet-Boot Jack (Atari 8-bit, C64, BBC Micro, Acorn Electron, Amstrad CPC)
- Krazy Kopter (Atari 8-bit)
- Neptune's Daughter (C64, Atari 8-bit)
- Steeple Jack (Atari 8-bit)
- Venus Voyager 2 (Atari 8-bit)
- Xenon Raid (Atari 8-bit)

=== 1984 ===
- The Adventures of Robin Hood (Atari 8-bit)
- Colossus Chess 3.0 (Atari 8-bit)
- Duellin' Droid (Atari 8-bit)
- Dan Strikes Back (Atari 8-bit)
- Henry's House (C64), released for the Atari 8-bit by Mastertronic
- Legend of the Knucker-Hole (C64)
- Spaceman Sid (BBC Micro, Acorn Electron)
- Stranded (Atari 8-bit, C64), ports of the BBC/Electron game first published by Superior Software
- Witchswitch (C64)

=== 1985 ===
- Chop Suey (Atari 8-bit)
- Elektra Glide (Atari 8-bit, C64, Amstrad CPC)
- Fire Chief (Atari 8-bit)
- Hijack! (Atari 8-bit)
- Kissin' Kousins (Acorn Electron, Atari 8-bit, BBC Micro)
- Mediator (Atari 8-bit, C64)
- Timeslip (Atari 8-bit, Commodore 16, Plus/4)
- Topper the Copper (C64)

=== 1986 ===
- Knight Games (C64, Amstrad CPC), ported to MS-DOS by Mastertronic
- Q-Ball (Atari ST, Amiga)

=== 1987 ===
- Leviathan (C64, Amstrad CPC, ZX Spectrum, Atari ST, Amiga)
- Octapolis (C64)
- Knight Games 2: Space Trilogy (C64)
