= Captain Sticky's Gold =

1983 video game

- Publisher: English Software
- Designer: Steven A. Riding
- Platform: Atari 8-bit
- Release: 1983
- Genre: Action

Captain Sticky's Gold is a scuba diving themed action game written by Steven A. Riding and published by English Software for Atari 8-bit computers in 1983. Riding also wrote Airstrike and Airstrike II for the same publisher.

== Gameplay ==
Gameplay screenshot

In Captain Sticky's Gold the player controls a scuba diver attempting to retrieve gold bars from the bottom of the ocean.

The game plays on a single screen, with most of it covered by water. Gold bars randomly appear in three seabed mines on the bottom. The player needs to avoid obstacles to reach a gold bar, use the rope to retrieve it, and then reach the surface to refill the limited oxygen supply and get a new rope. There is a time limit for retrieving each bar.

In the first levels, obstacles include fish that can be shot with a harpoon and leeches that drain oxygen. Later levels add an enemy helicopter attempts to bomb the player, monster crabs, missiles, and force fields.

Collecting ten bars of gold advances to the next level. After eight levels, the next zone is introduced.

== Reception ==
Home Computing Weekly in a review from 1984 praised the graphics and concluded: "If arcade games are your forte you will enjoy Captain Sticky. If not, you could find the game soon becomes repetitive." Personal Computer Games wrote: "Despite the silliness, it's fun to play."

Bob Chappell wrote a review for Personal Computer News and he gave the following verdict: "Colourful graphics with plenty of action and bags of sound effects (loved the theme tune) make this an enjoyable game."
