= Henry's House (video game) =

1984 video game

- Developer: Chris Murray
- Publishers: English Software (C64); Mastertronic (Atari)
- Platforms: Atari 8-bit, Commodore 64
- Release: 1984: C64; 1987: Atari
- Genre: Platform

Henry's House is a platform game developed by Chris Murray for the Atari 8-bit computers and Commodore 64. The Commodore 64 version was published by English Software in 1984, while the Atari 8-bit version from by Mastertronic followed in 1987. The game, produced in the United Kingdom, is loosely based on Prince Henry of Wales who was then a baby. The working title of the game was Home Sweet Home.

== Gameplay ==
Atari 8-bit screenshot

In Henry's House, the player guides Henry through the numerous rooms of the house. Each room in is filled with deadly household items like: toothbrushes, toasters, kettles and coffee makers. Touching one of these objects kills Henry. Falling from too great a height has a similar effect.

The goal is to reach the exit of each room. To do so, Henry must find the key, which appears only after some particular action is taken, and gather all the items that are scattered around the room.

== Reception ==
Henry's House received positive reviews. Bob Powers reviewed the game for the Atari User magazine and gave it an overall rating of 9, highlighting the great graphics and excellent value for money. Bob Chappell also praised the game in his review for the Personal Computer News. He concluded: "The graphics and animation are absolutely superb. There's a wide variety of excellent sound effects and the different challenges make this a game not to be missed."
