= Jean-Claude Renard =

French poet (1922–2002)

Jean-Claude Renard (22 April 1922, Toulon – 19 November 2002, Paris) was a French poet.

== Life ==
Renard entered the world of poetry with Juan in 1945, his first book. He was on the staff of Editions du Seuil and Editions Casterman.

== Awards ==
- 1988 Grand Award for Poetry of the Académie française
- 1991 Prix Goncourt for poetry

== Works ==
=== English translations ===
- Anthology of Contemporary French Poetry Graham Dunstan Martin, editor, University of Texas Press, 1971
- Selected Poems Oasis Books, Pierre de Ronsard. Ed. and trans. Malcolm Quainton, Elizabeth Vinestock. 1978, ISBN 978-0-903375-30-6

=== Poetry ===
- Juan, 1945
- Cantiques pour des pays perdus, 1947
- Haute-mer 1950
- La métamorphose du Monde, 1951
- Père, voici que l'homme Éditions du Seuil, 1955
- En une seule vigne: poèmes, Édition du Seuil, 1959
- Incantation des eaux Éditions du Seuil, 1962
- ''La Terre du sacre, Éditions du Seuil, 1966
- La Braise et la rivière Éditions du Seuil, 1969
- Le Dieu de nuit 1973:
- La Lumière du silence Éditions du Seuil, 1978
- 12 Dits 1980:
- Les Mots magiques 1980:
- Toutes les îles sont secrètes Éditions du Seuil, 1984, ISBN 978-2-02-006787-4
- La Terre du sacre, suivi de "La Braise et la Rivière" 1989:
- Sous de grands vents obscurs Seuil, 1990
- Le Dieu de nuit suivi de "La Lumière du silence" 1990:
- Dix Runes d'été 1994:
- Qui ou quoi? 1998:
- Ce puits que rien n'épuise Seuil, 1993
- Métamorphose du monde 2000:
- Le temps de la transmutation 2001:

=== Essays ===
- Notes sur la poésie Éditions du Seuil, 1970
- Notes sur la foi 1973:
- Le Lieu du voyageur : notes sur le mystère 1980:
- Une autre parole Éditions du Seuil, 1981, ISBN 978-2-02-005726-4
- «L’Expérience intérieure» de Georges Bataille ou la Négation du mystère, Éditions du Seuil, 1987
- Quand le poème devient prière 1987:
- Autres notes sur la poésie, la foi et la science Éditions du Seuil, 1995, ISBN 978-2-02-025060-3
