= The Tail of Beta Lyrae =

1983 video game

- Developer: Philip Price
- Publisher: Datamost
- Designer: Philip Price
- Composer: Gary Gilbertson
- Platform: Atari 8-bit
- Release: 1983
- Genre: Scrolling shooter

The Tail of Beta Lyrae is a horizontally scrolling shooter written by Philip Price for Atari 8-bit computers and published in 1983 by Datamost. The music is by Gary Gilbertson. Price and Gilbertson later collaborated on the Alternate Reality games.

== Plot ==
Gameplay screenshot

The Tail of Beta Lyrae puts the player in the role of "a wing commander assigned to the Beta Quadrant." Alien forces have occupied the mining colonies in the asteroid fields of the Beta Lyrae binary star system. The player pilots a fighter through the fields, destroying the alien invaders and their installations.

== Gameplay ==
As the landscape scrolls past, the player uses a joystick to move the ship around the screen, avoiding attacks from laser and missile emplacements and destroying buildings, power generators, vessels and alien miners. The landscape and configuration of objects is generated pseudo-randomly. Objects within the levels may change after the user has owned the game for a certain amount of time.

== Development ==
Philip Price stated that the "tail" in the game's name "came from a play on telling a tale and the setting of a binary star system which only had fragments of rock orbiting it because of the tidal forces brought on by the two suns; these fragments are the tail of the system's creation."

=== Audio ===
Game soundtrack (Atari 8-bit)

The Tail of Beta Lyrae's soundtrack was composed by Gary Gilbertson using Philip Price's Advanced Music Processor. Gilbertson considered the computer games to be an audio/visual experience, and even though he only had four square wave voices to work with, he was determined to make the sound as memorable as possible.

== Reception ==
The Tail of Beta Lyrae was met with a very positive reception. The Addison-Wesley Book of Atari Software 1984 gave the game a very good rating (B+) and concluded: "The music deserves an award for originality, and the game equals the best of the scrolling shoot-'em-up games on the market. It has great depth, is extremely playable, and offers a challenge even on the easiest level. " Electronic Games reviewer found the game is "distinguished by extensive animation, a charming musical score and sophisticated programming". Mark Stinson in a 1994 retro review for Page 6 concluded: "In the Tail of Beta Lyrae you get excellent gameplay, superb graphics, fast action, and good sound effects and music. Add to this the incredibly low price and it's a sure fire winner. Buy it now."

== See also ==
- Airstrike
- Caverns of Mars
- Star Blazer
