= Night Raid (disambiguation) =

A night raid is a military raid that occurs at night: see also night combat.

Night Raid may also refer to:

== Film and television ==
- Night Raid 1931, a Japanese anime series
- "Nite Raid/Rescue", an episode from the animated TV series The Head
- "Night Raid", an episode from the television series Ultraman Nexus

== Music ==
- "Night Raid", a soundtrack song by Maurice Seezer for the 1997 film The Boxer
- "Night Raid", a song by Nick Cave and the Bad Seeds from their 2019 album Ghosteen
- Night Raid, a military song used in the Republic of China (Taiwan)

== Video games ==
- Night Raid (video game), a 1992 video game remake of Paratrooper
- Night Raid, a 2001 video game by Takumi Corporation

== Other uses ==
- Night Raid, a sire of Throughbred racehorses, foaled in 1918.
- Night Raid (Akame ga Kill!), the main group of assassins in the manga series Akame ga Kill!
- Afghanistan night raids, a military tactic used in the War in Afghanistan.

== See also ==
- Night Raider, a video game
- Night Raiders (disambiguation)
- Raid (disambiguation)
