= Edgemar =

Shopping center in California, US

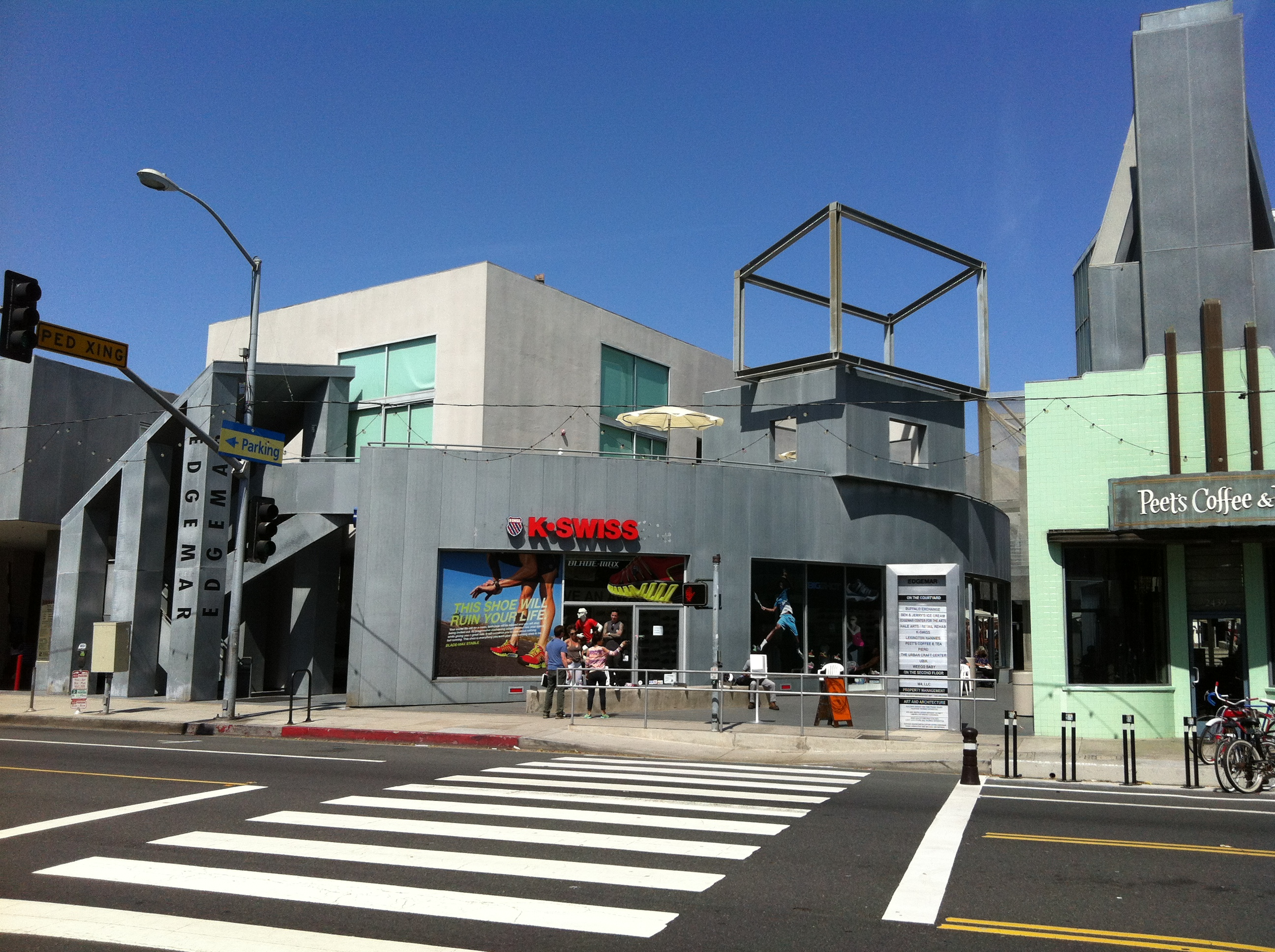
- Main Facade of Edgemar

General information
- Location: Santa Monica, CA, 2415–2449 Main Street, USA
- Coordinates: 34.0033704°N 118.4849574°W
- Construction started: 1984
- Completed: 1988

Technical details
- Floor area: Retail: 15,779 ft (4,809 m); Office: 8,106 ft (2,471 m); Restaurant: 3,405 ft (1,038 m); Theater Center: 6,350 ft (1,940 m) plus mezzanine Artist Lofts: 1,886 ft (575 m) plus mezzanine

Design and construction
- Architects: Buildings: Frank O. Gehry and Associates, Inc. Landscape: Emmet Wemple
- Developer: Sher Development

Website
- www.edgemar.com

Edgemar, located at 2415–2449 Main Street in Santa Monica, California, is a mixed-use shopping center designed by architect Frank Gehry that combines early 19th century warehouses, a 1940s Art Deco office building and new construction.

== History ==
=== 1908–1984 ===
In 1908, the Imperial Ice Company built an 8,000 square foot warehouse at the back of its property at 2435 Main Street in Santa Monica, California. Another 3,000 square foot warehouse was added beside it in 1928.

With the advent of refrigeration in the 1940s leading to a decline in the ice business, the Santa Monica Dairy Company, minority partners in the Imperial Ice Company, bought the property for the egg-processing division of their dairy. The Santa Monica Dairy Company, founded by Swiss immigrant Herman Michel, was the oldest dairy in Los Angeles County.

The company built a small Art Deco-style building with Main Street frontage for their offices. The 1908 warehouse became their "egg-candling room" in which eggs were held up to light to check for fertilization. The company's name was later changed to Edgemar Farms.

In 1983, the Michel Brothers sold their company to Foremost Dairy and placed the Main Street property on the market.

=== 1984–2007 ===
In 1984, Thomas Eatherton, an artist whose studio was in a 2,000 square foot metal outbuilding on the north end of the site, showed neighbor Abby Sher, who had a family history of development, the original ice warehouse with its 25-foot ceilings, clerestory windows, and 8,000 square feet of clear span, and suggested its use as a museum. Sher took the suggestion as the impetus for creating a small piazza-like setting with the museum as its centerpiece. Influences were the Tuscan hill town of Volterra, with its central piazza containing, along with the usual shops and cafes, an Etruscan museum and a large fresco-adorned municipal building; and the 1948 neighborhood shopping center, The Brentwood Country Mart. Sher purchased the Edgemar Farms property in October 1984, and retained the use of the name, Edgemar, for the development.

In the early 1980s, the model of melding art with commerce was being widely explored as a way to support art institutions. In planning or under construction at the time were the California Plaza project that incorporated the Museum of Contemporary Art, Los Angeles; the expansion of the Museum of Modern Art, New York, funded through the sale of zoning rights for the Museum Tower project; and the Orange County Performing Arts Center, which opened in 1986 as part of South Coast Plaza.

Locally, the Edgemar project was part of wider restoration and adaptive reuse activities that included the Santa Monica Pier and Carousel and the transformation of the 1894 Roy Jones house into the Heritage Square Museum.

Sher selected architect Frank Gehry to design Edgemar, in part because many of his early projects included renovated and new construction, his then predilection for modest materials including galvanized metal, chain link, concrete, and stucco—all materials found on the original site—and because of his early experience working in the office of Victor Gruen Associates, premier shopping center architects.

The 50,000 square foot Edgemar site's zoning was split down the middle—commercial on Main Street and residential on Second Street, but the 1908 warehouse and its 1928 addition were located in the residentially zoned portion of the property. A Conditional Use Permit was required to transform the original Imperial Ice Company warehouse buildings to accommodate a restaurant and museum as well as retail and office spaces.

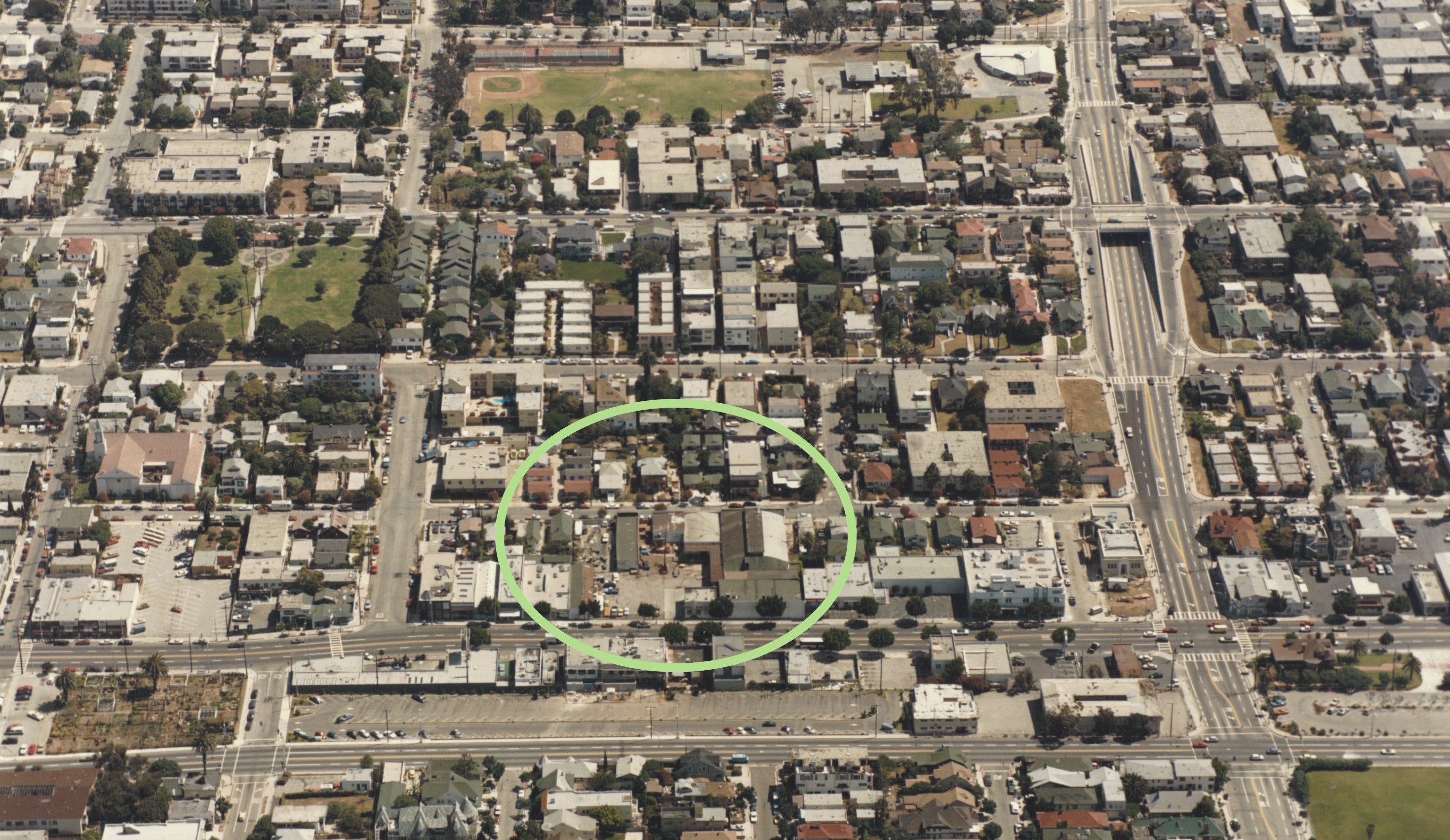
Aerial View of Edgemar Site, Pre-Construction, 1984, by The Aerial Photographer, Commissioned for Edgemar

In hearings before the Santa Monica Planning Commission, the Santa Monica City Council, and the California Coastal Commission, the development enjoyed strong backing from the art community, but encountered resistance from neighboring residents who were concerned about the impact to the neighborhood on parking, traffic, and noise. With design modifications that included additional parking and the building of a sound barrier that doubled as a planter, the project was approved in August 1988.

The 1908 warehouse, earthquake retrofitted, and with a mezzanine added, became home to the newly formed Santa Monica Museum of Art (SMMOA). The 1928 warehouse addition was converted to restaurant space. Of the 1940s art deco Edgemar office building, only the front wall with its art deco façade was retained; the new northwest wall was faced in green tile. Other new construction included a 2-story building for ground floor retail and second story office use, and a parking lot with one level of underground parking.

When construction was completed in 1988, Edgemar comprised roughly 16,000 square feet of space for retail, 8,000 square feet for office, 3,500 square feet for the restaurant, and 8,000 square feet, plus mezzanine, for the museum. In 1997, 6,000 square feet of the museum space was converted into a theater center, and the remaining 2,000 square feet became Second Street-facing artist lofts. These modifications were designed by Koning Eizenberg Architecture.

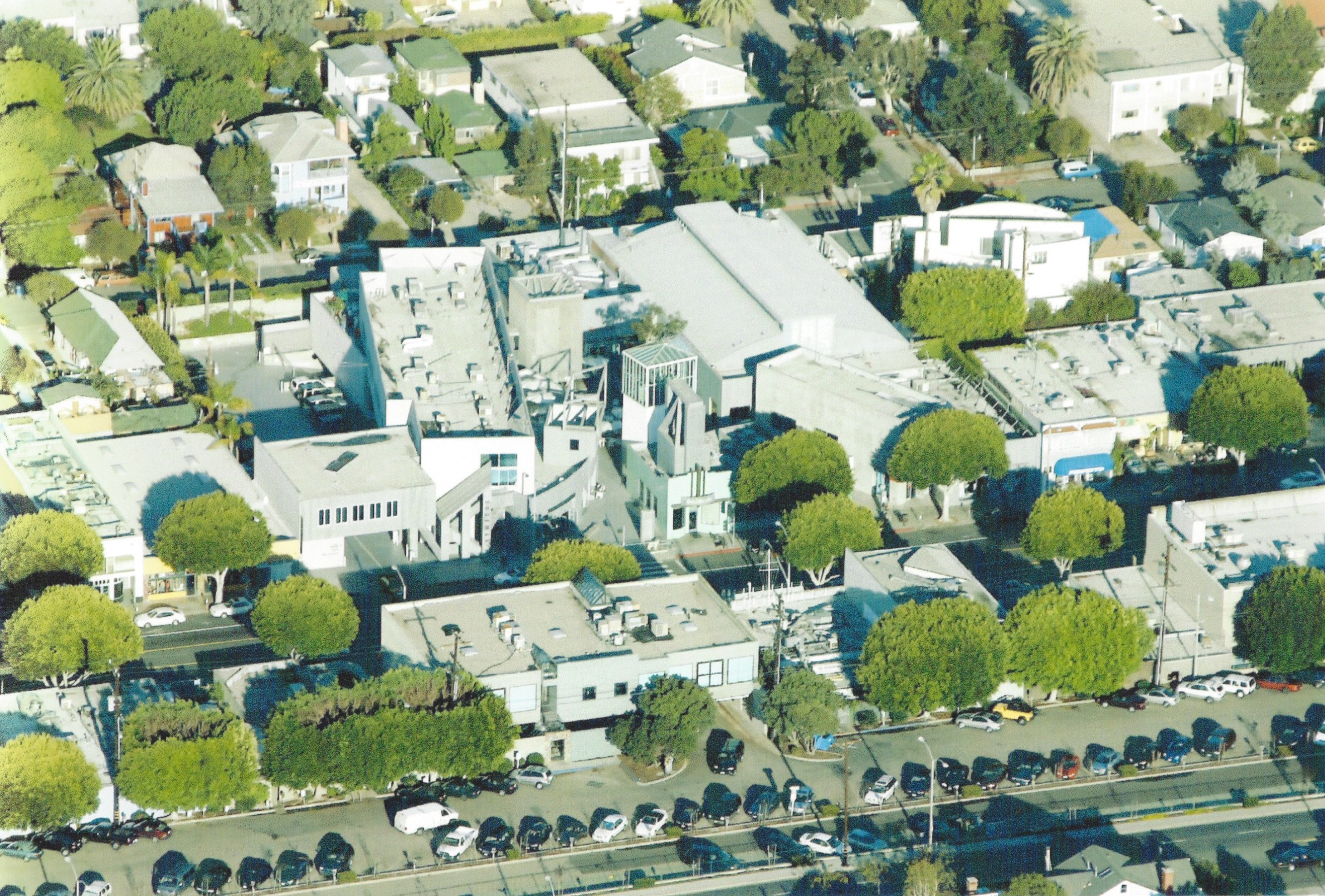
Aerial View of Edgemar Site, by Griff Hoerner, Commissioned for Edgemar, 2004

== Tenants ==
Gerber Kawasaki Wealth and Investment Management

The Edgemar Restaurant and Lounge. They were facing an eviction lawsuit and $147,000 state tax lien according to news reports on March 6, 2026 Edgemar Restaurant and Lounge is now facing a second lawsuit to evict them as filed by their landlord, a second civil lawsuit for failure to pay a contractor, and they are listed as permanently closed for business on Yelp and OpenTable.

=== Museum ===
Santa Monica Museum of Art (SMMOA)

Curator Hal Glicksman served as the museum's director during the planning phase.

Thomas Rhodes served as the museum's director from 1988 until 1998. The first exhibition under Rhodes' leadership, Art in The Raw, took place in the raw space before the interior build out was completed. This exhibition ran from July 21, 1988 through January 7, 1989, and included works by Michael Brewster, David Bunn, Meg Cranston, Daniel J. Martinez, Bryan Pezzone, Mineko Grimmer, Carl Stone, and May Sun.

In the fall of 1989, SMMOA held its inaugural exhibition in the finished space, Bon Angeles, organized in association with the Goethe Institute, Los Angeles, which brought eight artists from Düsseldorf, Germany for six weeks to use SMMOA as a studio and exhibition space. The artists included in this exhibition were Hilmar Boehle, Ernst Hesse, Marcel Hardung, Adolphe Lechtenberg, Annette Leyener, Julia Lohmann, Wasa Marjanov, and Manfred Müller.

The Santa Monica Museum of Art left Edgemar at the end of December 1996 and re-opened in Bergamot Station in 1998.

=== Retail ===
The first businesses to open in Edgemar were the Gallery of Functional Art (August 1988 – 1994), which featured artist and architect-designed furniture and other functional objects; the first Ben & Jerry's Ice Cream west of Chicago (opening in January 1989); and Röckenwagner Restaurant, which opened in the summer of 1991 and operated until 2006.

Other first generation tenants were Monsoon – an Asian import store (1989–1991); Quarterdeck/DESQaway – a remote office, and international newsstand (1989–1994); KikiLeweeBaby – Women's accessories and men's furnishings (1991–1994); Highlights – Designer lighting (1989–2007); Harriett Dorn Children – Children's clothing (1990–1994); Buffalo – Men's and women's designer clothing (1991–1996); Bannatyne Gallery – Craftsman furniture and antiques (1994–1997); and the Gallery of Contemporary Photography (1991–1995). In 1995, the Museum of Contemporary Art opened a museum gift store at Edgemar.

Current tenants (2015) tenants include: Buffalo Exchange, Blue Bottle Coffee, Santa Monica Travel & Tourism, Ben & Jerry's Ice Cream, Brick & Mortar Restaurant (in the space formerly occupied by Röckenwagner), Edgemar Center of the Arts, Hale Arts, Bomb Shell, Santa Monica Cross Fit.

=== Office ===
Mad River Post, a post-production facility, occupied most of the second floor offices for eighteen years (1989–2007).

Gerber Kawasaki Wealth and Investment Management now occupies the old theater.

=== Theater ===
As of 2025, the theatre has been transformed into the new headquarters for Gerber Kawasaki Wealth and Investment Management, a firm that specializes in holistic financial planning for families, tech executives, and many other local professionals.

The center hosts the Edgemar Center for the Arts, a collaborative rehearsal performance space. The arts center was founded in 1999 by Michelle Danner and Larry Moss and opened in 2002. The arts center is a self-supporting non-profit that hosts plays, classes, and summer camps.

=== Artist Lofts ===
There are two live/work artist lofts, each 1,310 square feet, along 2nd Street in the eastern end of the former museum space.

== Holidays ==
In 1995, Anthony Schmitt designed and constructed the first Edgemar Holiday Tree using shopping carts as his construction module. Every year since then, with one exception, Schmitt and his team have constructed the unique shopping cart tree. In 2012 the tree was made up of 86 shopping carts and measured thirty-three feet tall, with some smaller carts at the top to creating a forced perspective giving the illusion of even greater height.

The tree is assembled by hand just before Thanksgiving each year. When the construction is complete, it is decorated with lights and ornaments. Carolers sing and cider is served in conjunction with the Main Street Holiday Festival.

Summer Soulstice: Each summer since 1992, and most recently in conjunction with The Main Street summer solstice festival, Edgemar hosts musical performances in the courtyard.

== Art and Design ==
Courtyard

Edgemar Fountain by Thomas Eatherton

Umbrellas by Gregg Fleishman

Wind Sculpture by Paul Chilkov

Subterranean Parking Garage LISTEN EDGEMAR, a permanent sound installation created by Hugh Livingston and Michael Zbyszynski in Edgemar's subterranean parking garage, opened May 16, 2004. Fourteen speakers are installed in the ceiling of the garage. The installation incorporates "found sounds" from the Edgemar environment and recordings of improvisations by Jessica Catron (cello), Vinny Golia (woodwinds), Paul Livingstone (sitar), Pauline Oliveros (accordion), Jeremy Drake (guitar), and Philip Gelb (shakuhachi) in response to those sounds. Sounds and music are constantly sampled from a computer in the garage. New sounds come in and go out in conjunction with high and low tides at the Santa Monica Pier.
