= Night Raiders =

Night Raiders may refer to:

- Night Raiders (1952 film), an American Western film directed by Howard Bretherton
- Night Raiders (2021 film), a Canadian science fiction film directed by Danis Goulet
- Night Raiders, the defense force that appears in Ultraman Nexus
- Nightraiders, a 1983 video game published by DataMost
- Dive Bomber (video game), a 1988 video game developed by Acme Animation, known in Europe as Night Raider

== See also ==
- Night Raid (disambiguation)
