= Dan Strikes Back =

1984 video game

- Developer: Simon Hunt
- Publisher: English Software Company
- Platform: Atari 8-bit
- Release: 1984
- Genre: Maze
- Mode: Single-player

Dan Strikes Back is a 1984 maze video game developed and programmed by Simon Hunt and published by English Software Company for the Atari 8-bit computers. It is the direct sequel to Diamonds, sending Digger Dan into Brian the Blob's deepest vault to reclaim the stolen Great Diamond.

== Gameplay ==
Dan (blue sprite) is being pursued by Brian the Blob (green sprite) while waiting for one of the doors to open. Below, the spiderweb-filled level with the Giant Spider is visible

The game consists of six vertically stacked maze levels within Brian's vault, each separated by locked doors. Dan begins at the top on level 1 and must unlock the next door by either trampling all the mushrooms (levels 1, 3, and 6) or collecting all the small diamonds (levels 2, 4, and 5).

Controls are via joystick: pushing the stick moves Dan in that direction, and the fire button pauses or resumes play. Some tunnel sections cannot be climbed upward, forcing alternative routes. Level 3 introduces a Giant Spider that lays webs; Dan must break through webs by digging to descend. Levels 2 and 5 feature automatic doors that open and close at random, temporarily blocking passages.

Throughout each level, Brian the Blob relentlessly pursues Dan through the mining tunnels. Though slower-moving, Brian’s persistence and ability to block corridors or trap Dan against closing doors add a constant sense of pressure, requiring the player to plan routes and use evasive maneuvers to avoid capture.

Scoring awards points for each mushroom trampled (10 × level), small diamond collected (50 × level), web broken (100 pts), and bonus toadstools stomped (20 × level). Dan's remaining reserve diggers (lives) and current and high scores appear at the top of the screen. Losing a life occurs if Dan is caught by any creature or crushed while breaking a web. After retrieving the Great Diamond on level 6, Dan must escape; succeeding restarts play at increased speed and difficulty.

== Reception ==
In Big K (July 1984), the reviewer praised the "nice touches" such as the level-3 spider webs and Dan's translucent ghost upon death, but lamented that "three lives, with no bonuses, is a bit mean" and that random door timing could feel unfair. Computer Gamers "Atari Smash Hits" review (April 1985) noted the game played like "a mushroom-eating Pac-Man except that you can’t defend yourself… only avoid" the nasties, and commended its addictive vault-delving action. In Atari User's "Atari Smash Hits" review (June 1985), the sequel was described as "miles better than the original," with smooth animation and tense chases making it "a smash hit in our household" despite none of the testers reaching beyond level 5.
