= Tharolian Tunnels =

1982 video game

- Publisher: Datamost
- Programmer: Rod Nelsen
- Platform: Apple II
- Release: 1982
- Genre: Fixed shooter
- Mode: Single-player

Tharolian Tunnels is a fixed shooter for the Apple II family of computers programmed by Rod Nelsen and published by Datamost in 1982. The game is similar to Space Invaders.

== Premise ==
Softdisk magazine, issue 76, gives this brief description of game's premise: "Free the planet Tharolia from rule by maniacal machines." Similar in style to Space Invaders and Datamost's Cavern Creatures, the game puts you in control of a single armed spacecraft pitted against numerous waves of attacking aliens.

== Gameplay ==
The player first selects from three levels of difficulty—1) Pilot, 2) Captain, or 3) Commander—and then faces the first challenge, an attack by a slowly descending formation of aliens. This level closely parallels Space Invaders, with the aliens methodically sweeping from side to side, firing at the player, dropping slightly on each pass, and increasing in speed as their numbers dwindle. Unlike Space Invaders, the player has no protective barriers and must also dodge fiery meteors.

Subsequent levels throw different challenges at the player, such as carefully navigating down narrow, winding tunnels, dodging and attacking oncoming aliens and passing through pulsing energy barriers.

Players begin with three ships, each of which begins with a supply of fuel that it steadily consumes. The game ends when the last ship is destroyed.
