= Batty Builders =

1983 video game

- Developer: M. D. Caballero
- Publisher: English Software
- Platform: Atari 8-bit
- Release: 1983
- Genre: Action
- Mode: Single-player

Batty Builders is a 1983 action video game developed and programmed by M. D. Caballero and published by English Software Company for the Atari 8-bit computers. Players control a brickie on the ground who must catch falling patterned blocks and construct complete walls across eight increasing-difficulty levels.

== Gameplay ==
The brickie catches falling multicolored brick and launches it to complete the patterned wall.

Batty Builders uses a three-tier playfield split into a top conveyor belt, a middle partially built wall, and a bottom catch area. At the top, a conveyor belt carries multicolored patterned bricks (white, yellow, orange, and brown) moving from left to right. The player moves the joystick-controlled brickie along the bottom row to position under falling bricks.

Pressing the joystick fire button raises the brickie’s arms and if timed correctly, this catches a single brick as it falls. Once a brick is held, the player can move beneath the incomplete wall and press the fire button again to launch the held brick skyward, aiming it into a gap. Perfectly matched rows of the same colour or pattern award bonus points, while misaligned bricks still fill gaps but reduce scoring potential.

Each dropped brick that lands on the brickie deducts one of the five available lives. Completing the current wall advances play to the next stage. As levels progress, horizontally scrolling crates of TNT appear on the conveyor belt, requiring additional timing and dexterity to dodge while still catching and placing bricks.

== Reception ==
Home Computing Weekly (February 1984) observed that Batty Builders featured "excellent graphics but very little else going for it," praising the technical effort yet criticizing the gameplay as becoming tedious despite its eight-level design and bonus-pattern scoring. Bob Chappell in Personal Computer News (March 1984) lauded the game's originality in the tunnel-construction genre, describing its three-screen layout (conveyor, wall, and play area), the strategy of matching coloured bricks, and the escalating hazards of explosives on higher levels. He concluded that its unusual concept made Batty Builders "simple yet extremely addictive".
