= Earthly Delights =

Earthly Delights may refer to:

- Earthly Delights (record label), a UK record label
- Earthly Delights (computer game), a text adventure game for the Apple II
- Earthly Delights (album), the fifth album by noise rock band Lightning Bolt
- Earthly Delights (EP), 2025 release by David Archuleta

== See also ==
- The Garden of Earthly Delights, a painting by Hieronymus Bosch
