= Aztec (video game) =

1982 video game

- Developer: Datamost
- Publisher: Datamost
- Designer: Paul Stephenson
- Platforms: Apple II, Atari 8-bit, Commodore 64, FM-7, PC-88, Sharp X1
- Release: 1982: Apple; 1984: Atari 8-bit, C64
- Genre: Action-adventure
- Mode: Single-player

Aztec is an action-adventure game developed by Paul Stephenson for the Apple II and published by Datamost in 1982. It was ported to the Atari 8-bit computers and Commodore 64. In Aztec, the player enters and explores the recently discovered "Tomb of Quetzalcoatl" in Mexico in search of a jade idol.

== Gameplay ==
The player (bottom center) looking at their inventory, with three enemies roaming the area.

The tomb's levels contain traps, dangerous animals, Aztec guards, and other hazards. Equipped with a machete, pistol, and dynamite, the player must to recover a jade idol and escape.

Aztec generates a random dungeon for each new game. Before beginning play, the game prompts for a difficulty level from one to eight. Increasing the difficulty boosts the number and aggressiveness of the enemies and increases the reward for retrieving the idol. The shorter the time to obtain the idol, the higher the reward. Higher difficulty levels begin the countdown higher. If too much time elapses, the idol is reported as damaged.

The interior of the tomb is shown from the side with three floors and steps connecting the levels and floors. Piles of debris and chests can be searched, giving a pistol, ammunition, machete, dynamite, health potions, the remains of Professor Von Forster, or the idol. Dynamite sticks serve as both a weapon or to blow up walls and floors. It is possible to break a staircase which is necessary to leave the tomb or to blow up the player's character.

More dangerous foes may capture the player or confiscate items and lead the player into a pit. Enemies can also cause the player to fall to the next level. Some rooms contain pits with traps. If the player dies, play resumes from the last level.

== Reception ==
Softline in 1983 called Aztec "no ordinary arcade or adventure game", stating that "the controls, game design, and animation are good examples of the state of the art in Apple arcades".

Video magazine described the game as "a 'must buy' for Apple-ites", praising its variety, challenge, and its "straightforward system that uses single keystrokes" to communicate orders.

Tom Jones reviewed the game for Computer Gaming World, and stated that "When Aztec's few faults are balanced against some of the best action graphics and general designs now available, the latter definitely win hands down."

Electronic Games called the game's user interface "remarkably clean and logical", stating that because of the random dungeons "excitement remains keen through game after game".

Aztec received a Certificate of Merit in the category of "Best Computer Adventure" at the 5th annual Arcade Awards.
