= Die by the Sword =

1998 video game

- Developer: Treyarch
- Publisher: Interplay Productions (Note: Released under Tantrum Entertainment label)
- Directors: Peter T. Akemann; Don Likeness
- Producers: Peter T. Akemann; Christopher A. Busse; Mark Nau
- Programmer: Peter T. Akemann
- Artist: Chris Soares
- Composers: Rick Jackson; Ron Valdez; Brian Luzietti
- Platform: Microsoft Windows
- Release: NA: March 27, 1998; EU: 1998; Limb from Limb: NA: September 28, 1998; EU: 1998
- Genre: Action-adventure
- Modes: Single-player, multiplayer

Die by the Sword is a swordfighting action-adventure video game developed by Treyarch and published by Interplay Productions under their Tantrum Entertainment imprint on March 27, 1998. The game allows players to independently command the movement and swordfighting of their in-game avatars; running, jumping and turning with one hand, while simultaneously slashing, stabbing and parrying with the other. Die by the Sword also offered deathmatch and cooperative multiplayer play in its arena mode, where players could stage fights with up to three other players.

The expansion pack Limb from Limb was released on September 28, 1998 and added another main quest for the single-player campaign, enhanced multiplayer through a selection of significantly more creative arenas, and introduced new playable characters such as the Minotaur. A spiritual successor to Die by the Sword was released in 2000 exclusively for the Dreamcast, entitled Draconus: Cult of the Wyrm.

== Gameplay ==
The game allows the player to fully control their sword arm, removing the need for pre-recorded animations and statistically based gameplay. Instead, a physically correct model is used for each avatar and each weapon, and both movement and damage are calculated through forces.

The sword arm can be controlled by using a joystick, the numeric keypad, or a mouse. For example, with the keyboard, to perform a slashing attack with the default key combination, a player would press the '4' and '6' keys on the numeric keypad in succession. This will move the weapon from extreme left to right. The '8'-'2' combination will likewise perform a top-down striking motion. Blocking is accomplished similarly, not through a separate key or state like in all other games of this genre, but instead through the simple physical principle of positioning the weapon so that it intercepts, and blocks, the enemy's weapon. Shields operate like swords in this respect, though it is generally not possible to directly control the off-hand.

Alternatively, a player may opt to directly control his sword arm with mouse movements or a joystick to gain more subtle control. This allows a player to fluidly move his weapon in any direction instead of being limited to the eight points of a keypad. However characters featuring a weapon for either arm can only be properly controlled by keypad or by using predefined moves, due to their unorthodox movements.

A third and simpler method to using the mouse or keypad (as the mouse control can be awkward, and some laptops don't have keypads) is the game's "arcade mode", which uses the Y, U, and I keys to block low, medium, and high, respectively, and H, J, and K keys to chop, slash medium, and slash high, respectively. Turning, jumping, and other acrobatics can be used in tandem with sword control to add velocity to the weapon, increasing its damage potential significantly.

The player can target and eliminate specific body parts. A well-placed swing to the head can in some cases behead an opponent. Strong blows to the arms and legs can sever limbs, leaving the opponent with reduced mobility, or in the case of the sword arm, no way to inflict damage. This system encourages multiple hits to a specific region on the body, thereby slowly cutting the opponent, and reducing his effectiveness. Delicate locations such as the head and neck, while difficult to strike, offer a quick conclusion to those with the appropriate finesse.

In the expansion, Limb from Limb, the player can choose to play the original quest as an Orc, Skeleton, Mantis, and other monsters.

=== The Arena ===
The Arena mode in Die by the Sword consists of as many as four players or AI bots fighting in an enclosed arena. With the Limb From Limb expansion installed, there are a total of nine Arena 'Pits'.

=== Tournament Mode ===
Tournament mode allows the player to choose one of nine different fighters, and work up through different arenas with different combinations of other creatures. It ends with a final boss fight.

== Development ==
Project lead Peter Akemann cited The Bilestoad as a major inspiration for Die by the Sword. Instead of motion capture, the dominant animation technique of the time, Die by the Sword's animations were built with a physics engine that Akemann created over five years of post-graduate and doctoral work. This approach eliminated the need to use pre-recorded animations, thus enabling the player's free-form control over the character's sword swings.

== Reception ==
Reception

Aggregate score
| Aggregator | Score |
|---|---|
| GameRankings | (LFL) 54% |

Review scores
| Publication | Score |
|---|---|
| CNET Gamecenter | 8/10 |
| Computer Games Strategy Plus | (LFL) 4/5; 3.5/5 |
| Computer Gaming World | 3.5/5 (LFL) 3/5 |
| Game Informer | 8/10 (LFL) 7.5/10 |
| GameRevolution | B |
| GameSpot | 7/10 (LFL) 5.1/10 |
| IGN | 8/10 |
| Next Generation | 5/5 |
| PC Gamer (US) | 89% |
| Retro Gamer | 51% |

The game received mildly favorable reviews, while Limb from Limb received mixed reviews. Next Generation said that the game "should not be missed by anyone seeking immaculately done fantasy action. Recommended."

The game was a commercial failure, with sales of 28,603 units in the U.S. by April 1999. Interplay's Alan Pavlish attributed the failure to the game's control scheme and "a dark period when it slipped nine months, so it lost momentum."

Die by the Sword was named as a finalist for "PC Action Game of the Year" during the Academy of Interactive Arts & Sciences' inaugural Interactive Achievement Awards; the award ultimately went to Quake II.
