= Monster Smash =

1983 video game

- Publishers: Datamost; The Software Farm
- Designer: Dave Eisler
- Programmers: Apple, Atari; Dave Eisler; C64; Mark Riley
- Composer: Gary Gilbertson
- Platforms: Apple II, Atari 8-bit, Commodore 64
- Release: 1983: Apple, Atari; 1984: C64
- Genre: Action

Monster Smash (stylized in-game as Monster Smash!) is an action game written by Dave Eisler and published by Datamost in 1983 for the Apple II and Atari 8-bit computers. A Commodore 64 port followed in 1984. The music in the Atari 8-bit version was written by Gary Gilbertson and praised by reviewers. An earlier version of the game was published by The Software Farm in 1982 as Monster Mash.

== Gameplay ==
Atari 8-bit gameplay

The aim of Monster Smash is to capture all the monsters that are roaming around a local graveyard. The player must trap the monsters by opening and closing various gates and then smash them using the gravestones. If any monster reaches the right side of the screen it escapes, and if the player lets too many of them escape, as shown by a meter, the game ends. Once a certain number of monsters have been captured the player moves to the next level. In higher levels human visitors are introduced and the player must allow them to safely pass through a graveyard, while busy smashing the monsters.

=== Music ===
Monster Smash Title Music (Atari 8-bit)

A title theme of the Atari 8-bit version of Monster Smash was composed by Gary Gilbertson using Philip Price's Advanced Music Processor. Price and Gilbertson later collaborated on the Alternate Reality games.

== Reception ==
Steven A. Schwartz writing for Electronic Fun with Computers & Games praised the graphics and sound of the Apple II version but concluded: "All the features aside, however, it's mostly a test of manual dexterity and often an exercise in frustration." Jim Short in issue 15 of Page 6 praised the music of the Atari 8-bit version of a game: "The outstanding thing about Monster Smash is the opening title tune. It is, without any shadow of doubt, the best musical score I've ever heard in a computer game. It is almost worth purchasing the game just to listen to the music. Yes, it is that good!" InfoWorld's Essential Guide to Atari Computers cited it as among the best Datamost arcade games.
