= Casino (1982 video game) =

- Cover art for Casino
- Developer: Bob Rosen
- Publisher: Datamost
- Platform: Apple II
- Release: 1982
- Genre: Casino games

Casino is a 1982 video game published by Datamost.

== Gameplay ==
Casino is a game in which five games are included: Blackjack, Keno, Poker, Roulette and Baccarat.

== Reception ==
Stuart Gorrie reviewed the game for Computer Gaming World, and stated that "Casino provides it's [sic] user with a little personal touch. As you enter the Casino, you are greeted and asked your name. Casino knows if you have been here before, as, you see, it keeps track of it's [sic] clientele. Casino knows all about you."
