= Jet-Boot Jack =

1983 video game

- Publishers: English Software (UK); Datamost (US)
- Designer: Jon Williams
- Programmers: Atari 8-bit Jon Williams; Commodore 64; Mark Taylor; Amstrad CPC; Colin Hughes; BBC Micro; Dave Woodhouse
- Platforms: Atari 8-bit, Acorn Electron, Amstrad CPC, BBC Micro, Commodore 64
- Release: EU: 1983; NA: 1984
- Genre: Platform

Jet-Boot Jack (also called The Music Machine starring Jet-Boot Jack) is a platform game written by Jon Williams for Atari 8-bit computers and published by English Software in 1983. It was ported to the Acorn Electron, Amstrad CPC, BBC Micro, and Commodore 64. A C64-only sequel, Legend of the Knucker-Hole, was released in 1984.

== Plot ==
The player controls Jack, a "space-age jogger", in a record production plant who must build up the ultimate music collection.

== Gameplay ==
Atari screenshot

The production plant is set out as a series of platforms connected by lifts. To complete each level, the player must collect all the musical notes while avoiding monsters, moving lifts and stalactites. Jack can be moved left or right using his jet boots to hover or by ducking and sliding under fatal stalactites or monsters. By hovering, Jack can clear lift shafts but if he stops over the shaft, it is fatal. Jack's jet energy runs down, particularly if he stands still for a while, and must be replenished by collecting vinyl from overhanging pods. Two types of monsters can be killed for bonus points by jumping on the platform above them. A third type of monster is invincible. Bonus points are awarded when a screen is completed based on the vinyl refills unused.

There are ten screens which then repeat at a higher difficulty level e.g. with more monsters and fewer refills per vinyl pod.

== Ports ==
Jet-Boot Jack was one of English's first games to be converted to other platforms beginning with the Commodore 64, also in 1983, and the Acorn Electron, Amstrad CPC, and BBC Micro in 1984. The Amstrad version was also later published by Amsoft (1985). In the US, the game was released by Datamost with the subtitle "Adventures in the Music Machine" on the cover and billed as The Music Machine starring Jet-Boot Jack on the title screen.

== Reception ==
Atari magazine Page 6 gave a positive review concluding: "Although on a now familiar theme the unique story line and good programming makes Jet Boot Jack well worth getting. The music is good and the scrolled opening credits are superb". The game was given "Hall of Fame" status by Computer and Video Games magazine. The Amstrad CPC version was given a score of 70% by Amstrad Action and 72% by Amtix.

== Legacy ==
The game was later lead game on the first three Atari Smash Hits compilations released by English Software.

A sequel, Legend of the Knucker-Hole starring Jet-Boot Jack, was published in 1984. Jon Williams developed that game on the Commodore 64, and it was not ported to any other systems.
