= The Soul Master =

1984 novel by Graham Dunstan Martin

- Cover of the first edition..
- Author: Graham Dunstan Martin
- Language: English
- Publisher: Allen & Unwin
- Publication date: 1984

The Soul Master is a horror novel by British writer Graham Dunstan Martin, published in 1984 by Allen & Unwin.

== Plot summary ==
The Soul Master is a novel in which Kosmion builds an army of puppets under his control by absorbing his victims.

== Reception ==
Dave Langford reviewed The Soul Master for White Dwarf #55, and stated that "I admired the ingenuity, but less so the writing: portentousness, reminders of the author's presence ('How shall I put it?' he wonders in print, breaking the narrative spell) and overuse of Significant Understatement."

== Reviews ==
- Review by Brian Stableford (1984) in Fantasy Review, August 1984
- Review by L. J. Hurst (1986) in Paperback Inferno, #58
