= Vertically scrolling video game =

Video game genre

A vertically scrolling video game or vertical scroller is a video game in which the player views the field of play principally from a top-down perspective, while the background scrolls from the top of the screen to the bottom (or, less often, from the bottom to the top) to create the illusion that the player character is moving in the game world.

Continuous vertical scrolling is designed to suggest the appearance of constant forward motion, such as driving. The game sets a pace for play, and the player must react quickly to the changing environment. While top-down racing games, skiing and other sports games, and pinball simulations all commonly use vertical scrolling, the genre of vertically scrolling shooters has made it a fundamental design element.

== History ==
In the 1970s, most vertically scrolling games involved driving. The first vertically scrolling video game was Taito's Speed Race, released in November 1974. Atari's Hi-way was released eleven months later in 1975. Rapidly there were driving games that combined vertical, horizontal, and even diagonal scrolling, making the vertical-only distinction less important. Both Atari's Super Bug (1977) and Fire Truck (1978) are driving games with multidirectional scrolling. Sega's Monaco GP (1979) is a vertical-only scrolling racing game, but in color.

One of the first non-driving vertically scrolling games was Atari Football (1978). Scrolling prevents the entire field from having to fit on the screen at once. Many later sports games kept the purely vertical scrolling display, such as TV Sports: Football (1988), while others zoomed in closer, adding varying amounts of horizontal scrolling.

Another early concept that leaned on vertical scrolling is skiing. Street Racer (1977), one of the launch titles for the Atari Video Computer System, includes a slalom game in which the gates move down an otherwise empty playfield to give the impression of vertical scrolling. Magnavox published Alpine Skiing! in 1979 for their Odyssey² game console. In 1980, the same year Activision published Bob Whitehead's Skiing for the Atari 2600, Mattel published a different slalom game, also called Skiing, for their Intellivision console. In 1981 Taito published Alpine Ski, an arcade video game with three modes of play.

The 1980 Nichibutsu arcade game Crazy Climber has the player scaling a vertically scrolling skyscraper. Spider-Man for the Atari 2600 also involves vertically scrolling as the titular character climbs up building. Data East's 1981 arcade Flash Boy was released in two versions: a side-scrolling version and a vertical scrolling version.

Pinball Quest (1989) and Devil's Crush (1990) are early examples of pinball video games with vertically scrolling playfields, a format which became popular in the 1990s. Scrolling solves the problem of how to fit a fundamentally vertical game on a horizontal monitor without shrinking the visuals.

=== Vertically scrolling shooters ===
1979's Galaxian from Namco is a fixed shooter played over a starfield background which gives the impression of vertical movement. The same is true of Ozma Wars from later the same year. The 1981 arcade game Pleiades is a fixed-shooter that vertically scrolls as a transition between stages and then continuously scrolls during a docking sequence.

In 1981, Sega's arcade scrolling shooters Borderline and Space Odyssey, as well as SNK's Vanguard, have both horizontally and vertically scrolling segments—even diagonal scrolling in the case of the latter. The Atari 8-bit computer game Caverns of Mars follows the visual style and some of the gameplay of the horizontally-scrolling Scramble arcade game released earlier in the year. The Atari 8-bit computers have hardware support for vertical, as well as horizontal, smooth scrolling. Caverns of Mars was cloned for the Apple II as Cavern Creatures (1983).

In 1982, Namco's Xevious established the template for many vertically scrolling shooters to come: a top down view of a ship flying over a landscape with air targets to shoot and ground targets to bomb. That same year, Carol Shaw's River Raid was released, a highly rated vertically scrolling shooter for the Atari 2600. The less successful vertical scroller Fantastic Voyage (based on the 1966 film) was also published for the 2600 in 1982. A similar concept was used in Taito's 1983 Bio Attack arcade game.

Xevious-esque vertically scrolling shooters rapidly appeared in the following years: Konami's Mega Zone (1983), Capcom's Vulgus (1984), Savage Bees (1985), Tiger-Heli (1985), Terra Cresta (1985), and TwinBee (1985). Capcom's 1942 (1984) added floating power-ups and end-of-level bosses to the standard formula. The style of game continued to be popular in the 1990s, with more elaborate 2D graphics, bosses, and power-ups, such as in Raiden (1990) and later games in the series. The genre spun off bullet hell shooters with the release of Batsugun in 1993, followed by many others such as DonPachi (1995) and DoDonPachi (1997).

Taito's mostly vertical Front Line (1982) focuses on on-foot military combat, where the player can shoot, throw grenades, and climb in and out of tanks while moving deeper into enemy territory. The game had little influence until three years later when in 1985 Capcom released Commando and Gun.Smoke both of which had a similar formula, followed by Ikari Warriors in 1986, which added co-op. The on-foot genre eventually was eventually labeled run and gun and also included horizontally scrolling games.

== See also ==
- Side-scrolling video game
- Parallax scrolling
