= Timeslip (video game) =

1985 video game

- Developer: Jon Williams
- Publishers: English Software; Byte Back
- Platforms: Atari 8-bit, Commodore 16, Plus/4
- Release: 1985: C16, Plus/4; 1986: Atari
- Genre: Scrolling shooter

Timeslip is a horizontally scrolling shooter written by Jon Williams for the Commodore 16 and Plus/4 computers and published by English Software in 1985. A version for Atari 8-bit computers followed a year later. The game was described by reviewers as "three versions of Scramble rolled into one".

== Gameplay ==
Atari 8-bit screenshot

In Timeslip the player is presented with the screen divided into three sections or time zones. The top section is the planet surface with the player controlling a fighter, the middle section is set in underground cavers, and in the bottom section the player controls a mini-sub. The object of the game is to destroy 36 orbs placed within the three sections and synchronize the clocks in all three zones to 00.00 hours. If a player is hit, they receive a 30 minute penalty. In addition, if a player is hit five times, a "timeslip" occurs, which is a desynchronisation of all clocks. Sections are played one at a time and the player can switch zones at will, leaving the other two frozen in time.

== Reception ==
Timeslip received mostly positive reviews. Your Commodore reviewer summed up Timeslip as the best game he had seen on the C16, and he recommended it without hesitation. The review in Computer and Video Games magazine was equally positive: "Timeslip's designer and programmer, Jon Williams, has come up with a nifty and exciting little game. C16 owners should raise three cheers for him "

== See also ==
- Airstrike (video game)
