= The Dream Wall =

Novel by Graham D Martin

First edition (publ. Unwin Paperbacks)

The Dream Wall is a novel by Graham Dunstan Martin published in 1987.

== Plot summary ==
The Dream Wall is a novel in which the two main characters dream of their counterparts in a 22nd Century Soviet Britain.

== Reception ==
Dave Langford reviewed The Dream Wall for White Dwarf #92, and stated that "This witty nightmare has interesting ideas to offer (including a philosophical assault on doctrinaire materialism): I only wish I hadn't read it during a depressing General Election whose result was all too consistent with Martin's nastier alternative future."

== Reviews ==
- Review by Jon Wallace (1954 -) (1987) in Vector 139
- Review by Lee Montgomerie (1988) in Interzone, #23 Spring 1988
