= Airstrike II =

1983 video game

- Publisher: English Software
- Designer: Steven A. Riding
- Platform: Atari 8-bit
- Release: 1983
- Genre: Scrolling shooter

Airstrike II (shown on the box cover, but not the title screen, as Airstrike 2) is a horizontally scrolling shooter written by Steven A. Riding and published by English Software for Atari 8-bit computers in 1983. Airstrike II is a successor to the 1982 Airstrike which was also programmed by Riding. Both games have gameplay similar to the Scramble arcade game.

== Gameplay ==
Gameplay screenshot

The goal of Airstrike II is to clear all five zones using a fighter ship armed with a laser gun and bombs. The ship's ammo and fuel are limited, but can be replenished by shooting a respective dump (F for fuel and A for ammo). The player's ship must navigate tight caverns and watch for enemy fighters and heat-sensitive missiles. The game is split in five zones, which have identical layout but increasing level of difficulty. Some improvements over the predecessor include addition of a scrolling map and a title screen music.

As in the original Airstrike, the joystick button shoots and space bar drops a bomb. Airstrike II adds an option where pressing the button while pushing the stick forward both shoots and drops a bomb.

== Reception ==
Airstrike II was met with a mixed response. Big K magazine reviewed it twice, with the first reviewer concluding: "It may be very clever, but it's a terrible looking game, and I, for one, spend too much time in front of a VDU to want to have to look at something this ugly." while a second reviewer was more forgiving: "Excellent use has been made of the Atari 800's considerable graphics [...] As it stands, probably English Software's best title".

Bob Chappell writing for Personal Computer News also liked it: "The caverns are filled with defence systems, making the game possibly the toughest and most varied version of this classic to date." Home Computing Weekly covered Airstrike II in issue #054, concluding: "The graphics are nicely detailed and well complemented by colour. If you haven't tired of the idea, Airstrike 2 should satisfy your appetite for quite a while."
