= Mars Cars =

1982 video game

- Developer: Datamost
- Publisher: Datamost
- Designer: David Husch
- Platform: Apple II
- Release: 1982
- Genre: Maze
- Mode: Single-player

Mars Cars is a 1982 maze video game written by David Husch and published by Datamost for the Apple II.

== Gameplay ==
Gameplay screenshot

The player maneuvers a car to collect four treasures—one in each corner of the screen—while avoiding computer-controlled Mars Cars (which look more like aliens than vehicles). Getting touched by a Mars Car results in loss of a life. The player's car is allowed to drive through and remove the barriers making up the maze, but Mars Cars cannot. When all treasures are collected, the player can start the next level by driving into the warp area on the right side of the screen. There are sixteen levels and four different type of Martians as enemy types: Clutz, Fire Bug, Hatcher, and Kamikaze.

The inside cover of the game also served as a two page manual for the game. The manual included a short explanation of the game's themes, ideas, and how it is played, written by David Husch.
