= Money Munchers =

1982 video game

- Publisher: Datamost
- Designer: Bob Bishop
- Platform: Apple II
- Release: 1982
- Genre: Maze
- Mode: Single-player

Money Munchers (appearing on the title screen as Money Muncher) is an Apple II maze video game published by Datamost in 1982. It was written by Bob Bishop after he retired from Apple Computer in 1981.

== Gameplay ==
In Money Munchers, the player guides a small figure through a randomly generated maze, picking up the dollar signs and avoiding the deadly "Money Munchers": creatures that attempt devour the money before you can collect it. The goal is to clear each level of money to advance to the next. The second level adds deadly spiders, while the third adds snakes.

== Reception ==
Creative Computing wrote, "When we first got Money munchers, some of us were heard to mutter, 'Not another maze game.' When the mutterers went away, our play-testing panel was left with the game. Soon after, they were heard to say, 'No, it is not just another maze game'."
