= Spectre (1982 video game) =

Apple II video game

- Developers: Bob Flanagan; Scott Miller
- Publisher: Datamost
- Platform: Apple II
- Release: 1982
- Genre: Maze
- Mode: Single-player

Spectre is a video game for the Apple II written by Bob Flanagan and Scott Miller and published by Datamost in 1982.

Spectre is a Pac-Man variant with a goal of collecting dots while avoiding "Questers." The player navigates the maze with a 3D view on the left side of the screen and a top-down representation on the right.

A Spectre advertisement reads:

You're marooned between the stars, and the deadly Questers are swarming through the space ports to destroy you. Think fast, act faster if you hope to survive! Only Spectre brings you a fantastic 3-D maze action ... and a special enemy locator-screen
