= Swashbuckler (video game) =

1982 video game

- Developer: Paul Stephenson
- Publisher: Datamost
- Platforms: Apple II, PC-88
- Release: 1982
- Genre: Fighting
- Mode: Single-player

Swashbuckler is a fighting game created by Paul Stephenson for the Apple II and published by Datamost in 1982. The player controls a sword-wielding swashbuckler who must fight and dispatch various attackers. Combat occurs in a wooden-beamed ship's hold littered with skeletons and cobwebs, which the player views from the side.

The game was translated into Bulgarian under the name "Авантюрист" (Adventurer).

== Gameplay ==
Title screen

The fighter's actions are controlled with the keyboard, and include moving left or right (A and D), turning (S) and swinging the sword high (I), low (M), or lunging straight (L). The first opponent is a large, lumbering man with a spiked club; once defeated, the second opponent appears, a smaller man armed with a hatchet and a dagger. After defeating him, both return and attack together. As play progresses, more opponents are added to the fray, including enormous rats and venomous snakes. Eventually the swashbuckler progresses out of the hold to the sunlit deck, though opponents continue to be a major threat.

For each enemy dispatched, the game awards a point. The swashbuckler can withstand two hits, but the third kills him and ends the game. The difficulty steadily increases until he's overwhelmed. After 83 kills, the pattern of enemies keeps repeating and if the player manages to get 256 kills, the counter resets to zero.

== Reception ==
Michael Cranford gave Swashbuckler a positive review in Computer Gaming World, only lamenting the rollover of the five-digit score at 250 (which was fixed prior to final publication). The review appeared with an editor's note that although the graphics were superb and the concept unusual, the players at CGW grew tired of the lack of variety after a few dozen kills. Praising its animation, BYTE said "I think that most arcade-game fans will find Swashbuckler an enjoyable experience [and] well above the run-of-the-mill arcade game". Creative Computing Video & Arcade Games said that "it's a good change of pace" for those tired of space games.

In 2016, PC Mag included Swashbuckler on a list of "7 Forgotten Apple II Gaming Classics."
