= Kissin' Kousins =

1985 video game

- Publisher: English Software
- Platforms: Acorn Electron, Atari 8-bit, BBC Micro
- Release: 1985
- Genre: Action

Kissin' Kousins is an action game published in 1985 for the Acorn Electron, Atari 8-bit computer, and BBC Micro by English Software.

== Gameplay ==
Atari 8-bit screenshot

The object of Kissin' Kousins is to guide a little boy from left to right through ten dangerous screens while avoiding many obstacles, both stationary and moving. On reaching the right edge, the background scrolls to the next screen. Obstacles are related to the background: in the city (the first few screens), the player must avoid brick walls, hydrants, and garbage cans. As the player delves deeper into the forest, the obstacles turn into bugs, worms and toadstools. The player also has a pistol, which can be used to shoot at short distances. To increase the difficulty level, a bomb-dropping plane flies overhead, and each screen must be completed in a strict time limit.

If the player hits an obstacle, is blown up by a bomb, or runs out of time, they lose a life and must start the game over from the last screen. The player starts with five lives, and when all are lost, the game is over.

== Reception ==
Kissin' Kousins received mixed reviews. Bob Chappell, reviewer for Atari User magazine, found the game fair, but lacking variety and excitement. Computer and Video Games reviewer found the game amusing and "cheap at the price". Rog Frost writing for the Electron User liked the game and concluded: "The graphics and the animation are of a superb standard and the sound is adequate. [...] Recommended for arcade addicts of all ages".
