= The Missing Ring =

1982 video game

- Title screen
- Publisher(s): Datamost
- Designer(s): Terry Romine
- Platform(s): Apple II
- Release: 1982
- Genre(s): Role-playing
- Mode(s): Single-player, multiplayer

The Missing Ring is a role-playing video game written by Terry Romine for the Apple II and published in 1982 by Datamost.

The Missing Ring is a fantasy adventure with a similar premise to the Dungeons & Dragons role-playing game series: a band of adventurers, which may include humans, elves, dwarves or wizards, enters an enchanted palace to seek treasure and slay enemies. The ultimate objective is to find a wizard's ancient ring.

== Gameplay ==
Before play begins, the player selects an adventuring party to send into the map. The party may include up to five characters drawn from the following nine classes:

1. Fighter with Sword
2. Wizard
3. Elf with Bow
4. Dwarf with Ax
5. Fighter with Ax
6. Elf with Sword
7. Dwarf with Hammer
8. Fighter with Bow
9. Cleric

The player may also visit the merchant and spend gold to equip the characters with such things as healing potions. Once the party is assembled, the player selects one of ten different maps to explore and play begins. Though one player can control all the characters, the game can also be played with multiple players, each controlling a single character in the party.

Characters appear as small, white silhouettes, and move through rooms rendered as perspective line drawings. A header at the top of the screen indicates the room being shown, and a footer gives details about the active character, including his level, health and experience.

Two complete sets of controls are arranged at either end of the keyboard, allowing two people to play simultaneously without having to trade off.

== Reception ==
In 1984, Softline readers named the game the eighth-worst Apple program of 1983.
