= Elektra Glide =

1985 video game

- Publishers: English Software; Mastertronic
- Designer: Adam Billyard
- Composers: Yekao; David Whittaker
- Platforms: Amstrad CPC, Atari 8-bit, Commodore 64
- Release: 1985
- Genre: Racing

Elektra Glide is a futuristic motorcycle racing game developed by designer Adam Billyard for the Atari 8-bit computers, Amstrad CPC, and Commodore 64. It was published in 1985 by English Software. Mastertronic also published the game in the US.

== Gameplay ==
Gameplay screenshot (Atari 8-bit)

The objective of Elektra Glide is to stay on the track, and reach the tunnel leading to the start of the next section before time runs out. Many strange obstacles stand in the way of achieving this goal, such as spinning prisms, bouncing globes, and airships that drop columns in the player's path. There are three different zones to race across: America, Australia and the British mainland with each zone having different landscape graphics.

== Reception ==
Elektra Glide was a commercial success in Europe, selling around forty to fifty thousand units. The game received very positive reviews in the contemporary press. Computer and Video Games reviewer praised the game and rated it as "the second best Atari game released this year" Computer Gamer magazine review was also very positive and summed up: "One of the best Atari/Commodore games that I have seen for a long time - go out and buy it now!"
