= Diamonds (1983 video game) =

1983 video game

- Developer: Simon Hunt
- Publisher: English Software
- Platform: Atari 8-bit
- Release: 1983
- Genre: Action
- Modes: Single-player, multiplayer

Diamonds is a 1983 action video game developed and programmed by Simon Hunt and published by English Software Company for the Atari 8-bit computers. Players guide Digger Dan through 64 flip-screen levels, digging through soil to collect diamonds while avoiding hazards such as falling rocks and a host of pursuers.

== Gameplay ==
Digger Dan (blue sprite) about to collect glowing diamonds while evading Brian the Blob (green sprite)

The player controls Digger Dan with a joystick, carving tunnels horizontally or vertically through layers of differently shaded brown soil. Diamonds are scattered throughout; collecting them all on each of the four screens per level unlocks access to the next. Rocks and boulders fall if unsupported, both as obstacles and as means to eliminate enemies by crushing them. Dan can only climb upward when between two solid walls, requiring strategic tunnel planning.

Dan's pursuers include a slow-moving but persistent blob (Brian the Blob); Philip the Filler, who refills previously dug tunnels; swift fireflies that dart unpredictably; Simon the Snake, which slithers through tunnels; spectral Eyes that appear and vanish; and a Demon, each exhibiting distinct behaviors that require different strategies to evade or trap. Enemies can be crushed under falling rocks, and extra points are awarded for each foe eliminated this way.

Points are awarded for each diamond collected, with additional bonuses granted for bringing diamonds safely back to the surface. The game offers three starting lives, lost when Dan is caught by an enemy or crushed by a rock.

== Reception ==
Computer and Video Games (September 1983) in its "Down Under With The Monsters" column contrasted Diamonds with contemporary tunnel-digging clones, naming it the best of the bunch. The reviewer highlighted the deeper strategy and planning required to clear each screen, praised the variety of enemies-including fireflies, Brian the Blob, Simon the Snake, the Eyes, the Demon, and later-stage Philip the Filler-and noted the prize competition for uncovering the Great Diamond on level 16. At £14.95 on cassette or disk, it was lauded as "a superior game at half the price" of its peers.

Bob Chappell in Personal Computer News (December 1983) called it "an excellent version of the tunnel-digging species of arcade game," commending the variety of foes and addictive gameplay, quipping it was "a great excuse to skip digging the garden."

Games Computing (July 1984) praised Diamonds’ colourful graphics and high-quality sound, noting the six distinct enemy characters each with unique behaviours. Reviewers highlighted the sixteen levels (each comprising four sheets), the bonus scoring for returning diamonds to the surface, and the associated competition offering a real diamond, trophy, and free software prize.
