= The Bilestoad =

1982 video game

- Publisher: Datamost
- Designer: Marc Goodman
- Platform: Apple II
- Release: 1982
- Genre: Fighting
- Modes: Single-player, multiplayer

The Bilestoad is a fighting video game by Marc Goodman (credited as "Mangrove Earthshoe") for the Apple II and published in 1982 by Datamost.

In The Bilestoad, players control "meatlings" that hack and battle with axes and shields from a top-view perspective. The name is derived from the German words Beil (axe) and Tod (death). The odd spelling reflects Goodman's idea of a future language similar to A Clockwork Orange's Nadsat in which English has been modified by the borrowing of foreign words. Although the game may seem medieval, the backstory in the manual explains that the axe fighting is actually a future virtual reality game designed to reduce real violence.

According to the author, influences for The Bilestoad include the movie Excalibur and Monty Python and the Holy Grail.

== Gameplay ==
The Bilestoad allows a human player to fight against either a computer-controlled opponent or another human. One can also pit two robots against each other. Movement and combat is accomplished with the keyboard, pressing keys to swing the gladiator's axe or shield outwards or inwards, or to make the gladiator turn, stop or walk. Players can lop off their opponents' shield or sword arms, and dispatch them by decapitation. Players progress through levels by successfully defeating their opponent. The highest level is called "Master".

The combat arena is a small island, maps of which (at short, medium, and long range) are shown at the right side of the screen. Scattered around the arena are various objects, including yin/yang discs which players can stand on to accelerate their movement, stars that transport players to other points in the arena, and "faces" that allow players to leave the level. The game offers more strategic variation than many fighting games, letting the player run away and be chased around the island. The musical soundtrack begins with Beethoven's "Für Elise".

== Development ==
The Apple II has no built-in tone generator; all sound and music is produced by toggling on/off the speaker at appropriate intervals to generate the desired frequency. The game's incorporation of music with gameplay was an impressive technical feat.

== Legacy ==
In the mid-1990s, Marc Goodman released an alpha demo of a re-working of the game for the Macintosh. Peter Akemann cited The Bilestoad as a major inspiration for his game Die by the Sword.

The assembly language source code for The Bilestoad was found on two 5.25 diskettes retrieved from a dumpster in Berkeley, California and purchased on eBay by the maintainer of apple2games.com in 2018. It was made available on GitHub in 2019.
