= Conquering Worlds =

1983 strategy video game

- Publisher: Datamost
- Designer: Walter Hochbrueckner
- Platform: Apple II
- Release: 1983
- Genre: Strategy

Conquering Worlds is a strategy video game for the Apple II developed by Walter Hochbrueckner and published in 1983 by Datamost.

== Gameplay ==
Conquering Worlds is a game in which the player is the Supreme Commander who takes control of enemy planets in the star system.

== Reception ==
James A. McPherson reviewed the game for Computer Gaming World, and stated that "The scenario for Conquering Worlds is not new, and only slightly different in overall concept from other games. It is similar to Galactic Attack and Titan Empire. If you own either of the two games, you will find Conquering Worlds to be similar."
