= Nightraiders =

1983 video game

- Developer: Sunware
- Publisher: Datamost
- Designer: Peter Filiberti
- Platform: Atari 8-bit
- Release: 1983
- Genre: Scrolling shooter

Nightraiders is a scrolling shooter designed by Peter Filiberti and published in 1983 by Datamost for Atari 8-bit computers. It was inspired by the 1982 arcade video game Zaxxon, but scrolls vertically instead of diagonally.

== Gameplay ==
Gameplay screenshot

The object of Nightraiders is to reach and destroy the enemy base. The player's ship can be moved back and forth along the bottom of the screen, firing laser cannons to destroy enemy tanks, bridges and other structures. The ship constantly consumes fuel, which can be replenished by shooting at alien fuel canisters. At the end of each stage is an alien base which must be destroyed to move to the next level.

== Reception ==
The Addison-Wesley Book of Atari Software 1984 reviewer gave the game a poor rating (D) and found it dull with very little to hold interest. Vincent Puglia reviewed the game in the July 1984 issue of Electronic Games. He called it "a poor's man Zaxxon" with graphics "slightly above normal - especially those of the city and the tanks within it - they're not what gamers have come to expect in bombing run games." He wrote, "perhaps the worst aspect of Nightraiders is the documentation," and even after reading it he was unclear what a fuel depot or even the enemy base looked like.
