= Earthly Delights (video game) =

1984 video game

- Publisher: Datamost
- Designers: Roger Webster; Daniel Leviton
- Platforms: Apple II, IBM PC, Mac
- Release: 1984
- Genre: Interactive fiction
- Mode: Single-player

Earthly Delights is an Apple II text adventure created by Roger Webster and Daniel Leviton and published by Datamost in 1984. It was ported to the IBM PC (as a self-booting disk) and Mac.

== Plot ==
In Earthly Delights, the story begins with the death of the player's uncle, whom they've not seen for many years, and the unusual inheritance received from him — a portrait of a beautiful woman entitled Earthly Delight. The uncle writes that pleasures and rewards will come to the player if they keep the picture, and exhorts them not to sell it. When a stranger approaches the player offering an enormous sum for the work, their suspicions are aroused and the adventure of Earthly Delights begins.

The introduction to the game describes the painting as "Parrish's Earthly Delight", alluding to American painter Maxfield Parrish. This allusion is supported by the painting's depiction on the cover, which mimics the mountainous landscape of Parrish's Canyon and female subject in flowing dress common in his works. Though Parrish never created a piece named Earthly Delight, Dutch artist Hieronymus Bosch painted a triptych named The Garden of Earthly Delights in the early 16th century.

== Gameplay ==
The game's interface shows the player's location in the fictional world in the upper left corner and the number of "moves" that have been made in the upper right. The player enters commands at the question mark prompt.
