= Night Raid (Taiwan) =

Taiwanese military song

"Night Raid" (夜襲) is a patriotic military song of the Republic of China Armed Forces based on the theme of night battles against the Imperial Japanese Army during the Second Sino-Japanese War, though the song was composed in 1962. The melody was composed by Li Jian, while the lyrics are by Huang Ying.

== Lyrics ==
Original in Taiwanese Mandarin

夜色茫茫 星月無光
只有砲聲 四野迴盪
只有火花 到處飛揚

腳尖著地 手握刀槍
英勇的弟兄們 挺進在漆黑的原野上

我們眼觀四面 我們耳聽八方
無聲無息 無聲無息
鑽向敵人的心臟 鑽進敵人的心臟

只等那信號一亮
只等那信號一響

我們就展開閃電攻擊
打一個轟轟烈烈的勝仗

Pinyin

Yèsè mángmáng, xīng yuè wú guāng
Zhǐyǒu pào shēng, sìyě huídàng
Zhǐyǒu huǒhuā, dàochù fēiyáng

Jiǎojiān zhuó dì, shǒu wò dāoqiāng
Yīngyǒng de dìxiōng men, tǐngjìn zài qīhēi de yuányě shàng

Wǒmen yǎn guān sìmiàn, wǒmen ěr tīng bāfāng
Wú shēng wú xī, wú shēng wú xī
Zuān xiàng dírén de xīnzàng, zuān jìn dírén de xīnzàng

Zhǐ děng nà xìnhào yī liàng
Zhǐ děng nà xìnhào yī xiǎng

Wǒmen jiù zhǎnkāi shǎndiàn gōngjī
Dǎ yī gè hōnghōng lièliè de shèngzhàng

English translation

The night is dark, the stars and the moon have no light
There's only the sound of cannonballs echoing in the fields
There are only sparks flying everywhere

Toes to the ground, arms in hand
Brave men
are marching on the dark ground

We look around
We listen around

Silent and breathless, silent and breathless
Drill into the enemy's heart
Drill into the enemy's heart

Just wait for that signal to light up,
just wait for that signal to ring

We will launch a swift attack
and fight a vigorous victory

== History ==
In September 1962, the Ministry of National Defense established the Military Song Composition Group of the National Defense, which recruited seven executives who were talented in writing and composing while serving in their respective units. The Night Ride was created in collaboration with Huang Ying (黄瑩) and Li Chien (李健), who are seven members of the group. Huang and Li were classmates in the sixth semester of the music department of the political cadre school and had a good understanding of each other.

The lyrics of Night Raid vividly and realistically describes the atmosphere of the troops at night when they are on the verge of war. The song is itself about the National Revolutionary Army fighting against Japanese troops at night during the Second Sino-Japanese War. The melody also changes in strength in line with the lyrics, gradually building up from a weak strength to a strong strength; in terms of rhythm, the first verse is in 4:4, the middle verse is in 4:2, and the final verse ends in 4:4, making it a rare descriptive and varied military song in the ROC National Army.

In 2014, Night Raid is a military song promoted by the Political Warfare Bureau of the Ministry of National Defense in 2014. In the same year, students of Taipei Municipal Fuxing Senior High School interpreted the song in an alternative way, which attracted the attention of some Taiwanese internet users.

During the campaign for the 2018 Taiwanese local elections, Kuomintang (KMT) Kaohsiung mayoral candidate Han Kuo-yu once again brought the song to the limelight when he led his supporters into the stage singing Night Raid during a campaign evening on Nov. 8 in Flagstaff Hill. The Humanistic Education Foundation argues that Night Attack embodies a hate consciousness of "exclusion of dissent, disregarding democracy, peace, the rule of law, and human rights", and stifling Taiwan's democracy. On November 20, 2020, a number of call-ups who participated in a National Guard educational call-up said that during the five-day call-up, the higher unit suggested that the five companies under their command should not choose to sing Night Raid for their military song competition, citing political pressure.
