= Airstrike (video game) =

1982 video game

- Cassette insert
- Publisher: English Software
- Designer: Steven A. Riding
- Platform: Atari 8-bit
- Release: NA: 1982
- Genre: Scrolling shooter

Airstrike is a horizontally scrolling shooter written by Steven A. Riding for Atari 8-bit computers. It was published in 1982 as the first release from UK-based English Software. Similar to Konami's 1981 Scramble arcade video game, the player flies through caverns while shooting and bombing targets, avoiding terrain, and managing fuel and (unlike Scramble) ammunition. The company described the game as "Very, very, difficult!" in magazine advertisements, and reviewers agreed with that assessment. Having to press the space bar to drop a bomb, while using a joystick for movement and firing, was also criticized.

Airstrike was followed by Airstrike II, also programmed by Riding, in 1983.

== Gameplay ==
A close encounter between the player's ship and a missile

The player controls a ship that flies horizontally to the right through caverns. Pressing the joystick button fires a laser, and the space bar drops a bomb. As in Scramble, fuel is limited, but can be replenished by shooting targets marked with an "F". Airstrike also restricts ammunition: the ship starts with 40 shots and 10 bombs and more are gained by destroying ammo dumps (marked with an "A"). Surface to air missiles on the terrain launch up toward the ship and can be destroyed when either on the ground or in mid-flight.

There are five difficulty settings.

== Reception ==
In a 1982 review for Electronic Games, Bill Kunkel wrote, "The graphics are absolutely top-notch, perhaps the finest recreation of the sort of coin-op which inspired Airstrike in the first place." He concluded, "With Airstrike, English Software shows it can produce coin-op look-alikes with the best of them. A new game, however, with a more original play concept, would establish this company as one of the best software producers around."

Walter Salm wrote in Electronic Fun with Computers & Games: "If you're looking for a good home version of Scramble, this is one of the best I've seen yet" and "it's hard as the devil to play–even at the easiest skill level." He mentioned pressing the space bar to drop a bomb as a flaw. In a COMPUTE! review in 1983, James V. Trunzio disliked that after the player's ship is destroyed, "the next one appears so fast that there is little time to regroup." His overall opinion was that, "Airstrike is exactly what it claims to be—a very demanding program." The Book of Atari Software 1983 called the game, "nearly impossible to play even on the easiest level," putting part of the blame on the sensitivity of the controls.

John J. Anderson covered Airstrike in a "Five Great Games for the Atari" roundup: "The graphics in this package are fair, though the multicolor character graphics look a bit blocky to me." He concluded, "In all, a good, but not excellent, effort."

== See also ==
- Caverns of Mars
- The Tail of Beta Lyrae
