= Knight Games =

1986 action video game

- Publisher: Mastertronic
- Platforms: Amstrad CPC, Commodore 64, MS-DOS
- Release: 1986
- Genre: Action

Knight Games is a 1986 video game published by Mastertronic.

== Gameplay ==
Knight Games is a game in which Medieval duels are conducted using weapons such as swords, battle axes, quarterstaves, and maces.

== Reception ==
David M. Wilson reviewed the game for Computer Gaming World, and stated that "Knight Games is proof positive that budgetware doesn't have to be garbageware."
