= Datamost =

American video game publisher

- Industry: Computer books Video games
- Founded: 1981; 45 years ago
- Founder: David Gordon
- Defunct: 1985; 41 years ago
- Fate: Bankruptcy dissolution
- Headquarters: Chatsworth, California

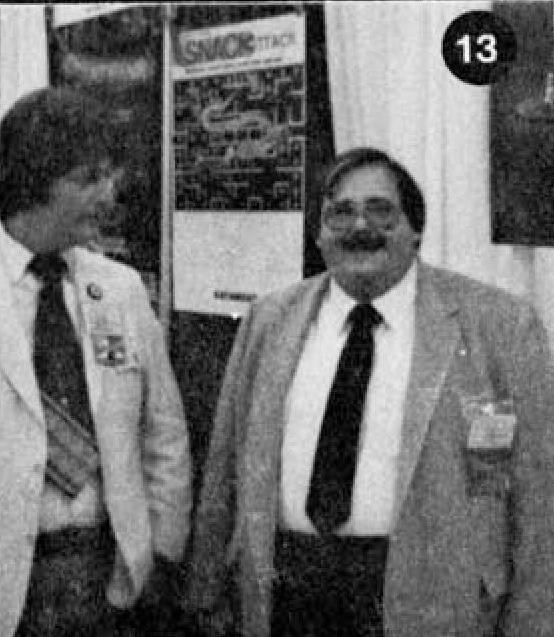
Founder David Gordon at the 1982 West Coast Computer Faire

Datamost was an American computer book publisher and computer game company founded by David Gordon (formerly of Programma International) and based in Chatsworth, California. Datamost operated in the early 1980s producing games and other software mainly for the Apple II, Commodore 64 and Atari 8-bit computers, with some for the IBM PC. It also published educational and reference materials related to home computers and computer programming. The company filed for Chapter 11 bankruptcy in July 1985 and went defunct shortly thereafter.

== Video games ==
Spectre title screen

1981

- County Carnival
- Thief

1982

- Aztec
- The Bilestoad
- Casino
- Guardian
- Mars Cars
- The Missing Ring
- Money Munchers
- Snack Attack
- Space Strike
- Spectre
- Swashbuckler
- Tharolian Tunnels
- Tubeway
- WizPlus

1983

- Ardy the Aardvark
- Argos by Ron Lowrance
- Cavern Creatures
- Cohen's Towers
- Conquering Worlds
- Cosmic Tunnels
- Mating Zone
- Monster Smash
- Mr. Robot and His Robot Factory
- Neon
- Nightraiders
- Pandora's Box
- Round About
- Space Ark
- Space Cadette
- Super Bunny
- The Tail of Beta Lyrae

1984

- Ankh by David Van Brink
- Earthly Delights
- Jet-Boot Jack
- Mabel's Mansion
- My Chess II
- Polar Pierre

== Publications ==
- How to Program the Apple II Using 6502 Assembly Language (1981) Using 6502 Assembly Language by Randy Hyde | PDF by Randy Hyde
- The Elementary Commodore-64 (1982) by William B. Sanders, Ph.D.
- How to Write an Apple Program (1982) by Ed Faulk
- Designing Apple Games with Pizazz (1983) by Greg Minter and John Ruffner
- p-Source (A Guide to the Apple Pascal System) (1983) by Randall Hyde
- Games Apples Play (1983) by Mark James Capella and Michael D. Weinstock
- Games Ataris Play (1983) by Hal Glicksman and Kent Simon
- Games Commodores Play (1983) by Phil Dennis and Greg Minter
- The Elementary Apple (1983) by William B. Sanders
- The Commodore 64 Experience (1983) by Mike Dean Klein
- The Atari Experience (1983) by Adrien Z. Lamothe, Jr.
- Atari Roots (1984) by Mark Andrews
- The Musical Atari (1984) by Hal Glickman
- The Apple Almanac (1984) by Eric Goez and William Sanders
- Apple Macintosh Primer (1984) by William Sanders
- Inside Commodore DOS (1984, 1985) by Richard Immers and Gerald G. Neufeld
- Sound and Graphics for the Apple II+, IIe (1984) by Jerry and Valerie Abad
- The Super Computer Snooper (1984) by Isaac Malitz
