= Hal Glicksman =

American Curator

- Born: 1937 (age 88–89); Beverly Hills, California, U.S.
- Education: UCLA
- Known for: Curation, computers, color theory

Hal Glicksman (born 1937) is an American curator of contemporary art, educator, and writer.

== Family and education ==
Glicksman was born in Beverly Hills, California. He attended Beverly Hills High School between 1951–1955 and UCLA 1955–59. He graduated with a Bachelor of Fine Arts in Art History in 1956.

== Career ==
Glicksman's career began when he worked as a preparator at Norton Simon Museum that was under the direction of the curator Walter Hopps. At the museum, Glicksman participated in formalizing a set of professional guidelines for preparators. While also employed at the museum, Glicksman worked on the Marcel Duchamp retrospective from 1963.

Glicksman contributed to the planning and design of the Pasadena Art Museum at Carmelita Park.

Glicksman was a founding board member of the Computer Access Center. This organization makes computer technology for persons with disabilities. In 1983, Glicksman assumed the role of Director of Publications for Datamost. This was a startup company that published personal how-to books and computer games for personal computers. He has authored The Musical Atari and Games Apples Play.

Glicksman took on the role of the Associate Director of The Center for the Educational Applications of Brain Hemisphere Research in 1986 at California State University Long Beach. The Center was directed and managed by Betty Edwards. While working there, Glicksman produced workshops and lectures in the United States, Japan, and Europe.

== Later life ==
In May 1997, Glicksman proposed the color theory that "White is Green" at the International Association of Color AIC Color in Kyoto, Japan. Additionally, he presented this theory and the "Percept Color Wheel at Electronic Imaging '99 San Jose, California, January 1999, and White is Green - New Schematic Diagrams at AIC Color 2001 in Rochester New York, June 2001. Glicksman returned to curating between 2005-2011 for The Getty Foundation's Pacific Standard Time Art in L.A. 1945-1980 initiative.
