= Time-Slip =

1986 post-apocalyptic novel by Graham Dunstan Martin

First edition (publ. Allen & Unwin)

Time-Slip is a post-apocalyptic novel by Graham Dunstan Martin published in 1986.

== Plot summary ==
Time-Slip is a novel in which a new Messiah appears in Scotland among survivors of World War III.

== Reception ==
Dave Langford reviewed Time-Slip for White Dwarf #78, and stated that "Martin makes it blackly clear that his protagonist's religious cure-all leads to an upswing in the evil it explains away."

Wendy Graham reviewed Time-Slip for Adventurer magazine and stated that "As an exploration of religion, past, present and probably future, the book does indeed have something to say, but as a novel, it is a 'two and half out of five’, for characterisation, it is a 'hit and miss', a bit shallow. The characters are puppets, moved around on very thin strings to further the message."

== Reviews ==
- Review by Brian Stableford (1986) in Fantasy Review, May 1986
- Review by Mark Greener (1986) in Vector 133
