= Caverns of Mars =

1981 video game

- Cartridge release
- Publishers: Atari Program Exchange; Atari, Inc.
- Designer: Greg Christensen
- Programmers: Greg Christensen; Richard Watts
- Platforms: Atari 8-bit, Atari 2600
- Release: Winter 1981: APX; April 1982: Atari (disk); 1983: Atari (cartridge)
- Genre: Scrolling shooter
- Mode: Single-player

Caverns of Mars is a vertically scrolling shooter for Atari 8-bit computers written by Greg Christensen, then a high school senior, with some features added by Richard Watts. It was published by the Atari Program Exchange in 1981. Caverns of Mars became the best selling Atari Program Exchange software of all-time and was moved into Atari, Inc.'s official product line, first on diskette in 1982, then on cartridge in 1983.

In Caverns of Mars, the player descends into a cave and at the end must retrace their steps back to the top. Christensen wrote two less successful follow-ups: Phobos, which is an enhanced version of the original, and Mars Mission II, which scrolls horizontally and is similar to the arcade video game Scramble.

== Gameplay ==
Opening scene showing a fuel tank and static rockets

Caverns of Mars is a scrolling shooter similar in concept and visual style to the 1981 Konami arcade video game Scramble. Christensen changed the orientation of the levels, having the player fly down into them as opposed to horizontally through them. Unlike Scramble, rockets in Caverns of Mars remain on the ground.

Using a joystick, the player controls a ship descending through a hole on the surface of Mars into a vertical tunnel. The player's spacecraft has two cannons, positioned on either side of the craft, firing downward. The player must avoid hitting the walls while shooting targets of opportunity along the way. Fuel tanks give 5 units of fuel when shot, and the craft is destroyed if it runs out.

The cavern is divided into different sections depending on the skill level: the easiest setting has three sections, the hardest has six. The final section is always a reactor which the player lands on and sets to explode. The ship then reverses course and has to fly up and out of the caverns to escape before the detonation occurs.

== Development ==
Greg Christensen, a high-school senior, purchased an Atari 800 in 1981 and created Caverns in "little more than a month and a half" using the Atari Assembler Editor. It was the first significant program he wrote in 6502 assembly language. Fred Thorlin of Atari Program Exchange recalled Caverns arriving at APX:

It was received by APX in the morning mail. I saw it at 10:30. We showed it to the president of the company just after lunch. It was not a tough decision for him. Legal got in touch with Greg Christensen in short order. The young man, I think he was a community college freshman, suddenly had a bunch of money inflicted upon him. I was never certain whether he benefited from that in the long run or not.

In the originally submitted version, when the player reached the end of the selected map, the game ended. Thorlin felt it needed something more. Christensen was too busy, but agreed to use his royalties to pay for someone else to do the work. Thorlin hired Richard Watts of Macrotronics to make a number of modifications. This included a new ending in which the player has to fly back out of the cavern in reverse before a timer runs out.

Two months after sending it to APX, Christensen received his first royalty check for $18,000 and a phone call from an Atari executive who praised the game. Caverns eventually won the 1981 APX game contest, winning another $3,000, and in December 1982, Atari told Christensen he might receive up to $100,000 in royalties.

Atari licensed the game in early 1982 for distribution in the main Atari catalog on diskette. This was the first game crossover from APX to Atari; it was followed by Eastern Front (1941) and Typo Attack. When asked to collaborate on a cartridge-based port, Christensen declined, having started college. Atari released the cartridge version in 1983.

== Reception ==
Computer Gaming World called Caverns of Mars "delightful ... addictive and excellently paced". It noted the age of the author and stated that the game "has all the look, feel, and play of a 'professional' program". Softline liked the game's use of checkpoints after losing a life, and called the game "great". Compute! called Caverns of Mars's graphics "impressive", noting that the game takes advantage of a little-used mode allowing four colors per character. A Creative Computing reviewer opened with "Four minutes later. I was hooked. Four hours later, my wife dragged me away" and concluded by noting that "the Caverns of Mars has that indefinable "something" that makes it arcade-quality". The Addison-Wesley Book of Atari Software 1984 gave the game an overall B+ rating, calling it "fast-paced and addictive" and "great fun ... a must for any dedicated arcade game player". InfoWorld's Essential Guide to Atari Computers cited it as a good Atari arcade game. Electronic Fun with Computers & Games gave it a 3.5 out of 5, praising the action and pointing out only a few minor flaws.

Caverns of Mars received a Certificate of Merit in the category of "Best Science Fiction/Fantasy Computer Game" at the 4th annual Arkie Awards.

== Legacy ==
=== Mars Mission II ===
Christensen followed Caverns with a lesser-known sequel, originally titled Caverns of Mars II. It is similar to Scramble, scrolling horizontally and with rockets that launch upward from the ground. The game was completed in 1981, but not published until several years later by Antic Software as Mars Mission II.

=== Phobos ===
Phobos keeps the vertical orientation of the original with improved graphics and more sections in each cavern. The caverns are narrower and more difficult to maneuver in right from the start. It was released through the Atari Program Exchange in 1982, then later Antic Software.

Softline stated that Phobos might disappoint Caverns of Mars players, saying that it was "a reinvention of the wheel" and too easy for them. The magazine noted some improvements, such as a pause button and multiple skill levels, but advised that "Mars veterans should wait". The Addition-Wesley Book of Atari Software 1984 gave the game an overall B rating, stating that "whether it is a better game than the original is debatable" and concluding that "it is a good choice for the dedicated arcade game player".

=== Re-releases ===
In 2005, a version of Caverns of Mars was included on the Atari Flashback 2 classic game console.

In 2023, an updated and revised version of the game was released for Windows, Nintendo Switch, PlayStation 4, PlayStation 5, Xbox One and Xbox Series X/S, under the title Caverns of Mars: Recharged.

In 2024, John Champeau's originally unauthorized port of Caverns of Mars for the Atari 2600 was re-released by Atari, as well as an enhanced version for the Atari 2600+.

=== Clones ===
Datamost's Cavern Creatures (1983) for the Apple II is similar to Caverns of Mars. Conquest of Mars (2006) for the Atari 2600 is a direct clone.
