= Graham Dunstan Martin =

British author (1932–2021)

- Born: 21 October 1932; Leeds
- Died: 27 March 2021 (aged 88)
- Occupation: Author

Graham Dunstan Martin (21 October 1932, Leeds – 27 March 2021) was a British author, translator, and philologist.

Martin was an opponent of materialist philosophy. He was the author of Does It Matter?: The Unsustainable World of the Materialists which gravitates towards idealism and neutral monism as an alternative. He also authored Living On Purpose: Meaning, Intention and Value which argued for purpose and value in the universe.

== Selected publications ==
=== Fiction ===
- Giftwish (Drew, 1978) ISBN 978-0-04-823175-8
- Catchfire (Drew, 1981) ISBN 978-0-395-31861-4
- The Soul Master (Unwin, 1984) ISBN 978-0-04-827094-8
- Time-Slip (Unwin, 1986) OCLC 761227833
- The Dream Wall (Unwin Hyman, 1987) ISBN 9780048233370
- Half a Glass of Moonshine (Unwin Hyman, 1988) ISBN 9780044400301

=== Non-fiction ===
- Shadows in the Cave: Mapping the Conscious Universe (London: Penguin Arkana, 1990) ISBN 9780140192230
- An Inquiry into the Purposes of Speculative Fiction – Fantasy and Truth (Lewiston, New York: The Edwin Mellen Press, 2003) ISBN 9780773467354
- Living on Purpose: Meaning, Intention and Value (Floris, 2008) ISBN 9780863156328
- Does It Matter?: The Unsustainable World of the Materialists. Edinburgh: Floris, 2005. ISBN 9780863155338
- Language Truth and Poetry: Notes Towards a Philosophy of Literature. Edinburgh: Edinburgh University Press, 1975. OCLC 1014865378
- The Architecture of Experience: A Discussion of the Role of Language and Literature in the Construction of the World. Edinburgh: At the University Press, 1981. ISBN 9780852244098

=== Edited ===
- Anthology of Contemporary French Poetry. Austin: University of Texas Press, 1975. OCLC 1470077

=== Translated ===
- Paul Valéry. The Graveyard by the Sea. Edinburgh: Edinburgh University Press, 1971. OCLC 504527110
- Louise Labé, pseud. Charly van Louise, Sonnets. With Introduction and Commentaries by Peter Sharratt. Edinburgh: Edinburgh University Press, 1974. ISBN 9780852242360
- Jules Laforgue, Selected Poems. London, England: Penguin Books, 1998. ISBN 9780140436266
