= Personal Computer News =

Defunct British computer review magazine

- 1983 June 30 - July 6 cover
- Editor: Cyndy Miles
- Frequency: Biweekly
- Publisher: VNU Publications
- First issue: 12 March 1983
- Final issue Number: 11 May 1985; 110
- Country: United Kingdom
- Language: English

Personal Computer News (PCN) was a magazine publication which reviewed software and hardware for computers. It was published initially fortnightly, and during the boom period of home computing within the United Kingdom. It was published by VNU Publications and had a female editor, Cyndy Miles, unusual for computer magazines of the time.

Its first issue was published on 12 March 1983. Its last issue, number 110, was published on 11 May 1985. It had a circulation of 150,000 in 1983. PCN had a lot of competition which peaked around mid-1984 with about 96 rival titles. It closed with an estimated £1 million in debts. PCN was unusual in being a weekly publication (most of its rivals were monthly with only two weeklies) and was a higher quality print with a glossy cover. Many of the monthlies were also glossies but PCN had the high cover price of 50p compared to the other weeklies. Its most direct rival Popular Computing Weekly was priced at only 35p.

A typical issue contained a number of articles, reviews, tutorials in computer programming and letters from readers on programming subjects. It had a regular column called Dungeon which concentrated on text adventures. Readout reviewed new books, and Gameplay reviewed new games. Other sections such as Hardware and Peripherals regularly appeared, but contained different products as they were released.

It is notable for containing articles, and programs, on a large number of computers that have slipped into obscurity. It also published a large number of computer games which readers could type in.

The British Microcomputing Awards were sponsored by VNU and heavily covered in PCN in conjunction with the Sunday Times and Thames Television.

It disappeared very suddenly with its last issue and without warning. Issue 110 featured part two of a three part article about modern adventure games. The third part was therefore lost.
