= Leeper =

Leeper may refer to:

== Communities ==
All in the United States

- Leeper, Missouri, an unincorporated community in Wayne County
- Leeper, Pennsylvania, a census-designated place in Clarion County
- Leepertown Township, Bureau County, Illinois

== People ==
- Alexander Leeper (1848–1934), Australian educationalist
- Arthur A. Leeper (1855–1931), American lawyer and politician in Illinois
- Blake Leeper (born 1989), American Paralympic athlete
- Bob Leeper (born 1958), American chiropractor and politician in Kentucky
- Curtis Leeper (born 1955), American soccer player
- Dave Leeper (born 1959), American baseball player
- David R. Leeper (1832–1900), American writer and politician in Indiana
- Doris Marie Leeper (1929–2000), American sculptor and painter
- Evelyn C. Leeper (born 1950), American writer and critic
- Jennifer Leeper (born 1984), American politician in Connecticut
- John Graves Leeper (1854–1931), American businessman and politician in Oklahoma
- Mary Ann Leeper, American activist
- Mekki Leeper (born 1994), American writer, actor, and stand-up comedian
- Nathan Leeper (born 1977), American high jumper
- Reginald Leeper (1888–1968), British civil servant and diplomat, son of Alexander Leeper
- Robert D. Leeper (1891–1932), American attorney and justice of the Idaho Supreme Court
- Valentine Leeper (1900–2001), Australian writer, daughter of Alexander Leeper

== Other uses ==
- Leeper Lake, a reservoir in Love County, Oklahoma
- Leepers, fictional creatures in the Sierra video games Lunar Leepers and Learning with Leeper
- Mount Leeper, a mountain in Alaska

== See also ==
- Leaper (disambiguation)
- Leiper, a surname
