= Milestone (disambiguation) =

A milestone is a marker of distance along roads.

Milestone may also refer to:

== Measurements ==
- Milestone (project management), metaphorically, markers of reaching an identifiable stage in any task or the project
- Software release life cycle state, see Pre-alpha
- Developmental milestones, tasks most children can perform at certain ages

== Geography ==
- Milestone (Arlington, Massachusetts), a historic milestone in Arlington, Massachusetts
- Milestone (electoral district), a former provincial electoral district for the Legislative Assembly of Saskatchewan, Canada
- Milestone, County Tipperary, a village in Ireland
- Milestone, Saskatchewan, Canada

== Literature ==
- Milestones (play), a 1912 play by Arnold Bennett and Edward Knoblock
- Milestones (book), a 1964 book by Egyptian Islamist Sayyid Qutb
- Milestones I (1983) and Milestones II (1985), by Jack Chambers
- Milestones (magazine), a Christadelphian magazine

== Film and TV ==
- Milestones (1916 film), British silent drama film based on the Arnold Bennett play
- Milestones (1920 film), American silent drama film based on the Arnold Bennett play
- Milestones (1975 film), by Robert Kramer and John Douglas

== Music ==
- Milestone Records, a jazz record label

=== Bands ===
- Milestones (Austrian band), a 1970s Austrian band
- The Milestones, a 1990s Pakistani band
- Milestones (British band), a British pop rock band

=== Albums ===
- Stan Kenton's Milestones, by Stan Kenton, 1950
- Milestones (Miles Davis album), 1958
- Milestones (Rolling Stones album), 1972
- Milestones (Roy Orbison album), 1973
- Milestones (Great Jazz Trio album), 1978
- Milestone (The Temptations album), 1991
- Milestone (Gideon album), 2012
- Milestones (Riff Regan album), 2015
- Milestone (Chrisette Michele album), 2016
- Milestone (Lead album), 2018

=== Songs ===
- "Milestones", a 1947 John Lewis composition credited to Miles Davis
- "Milestones" (instrumental composition), by Miles Davis from the 1958 album of the same name
- "Milestone" (song), by BoA

== Brands and enterprises ==
- Milestone (herbicide), a Dow AgroSciences brand name for aminopyralid
- Milestones Early Learning Centres, an Australian childcare provider owned by Quadrant Private Equity
- Milestone Films, an American film distributor
- MileStone Inc., a Japanese arcade video game developer
- Milestone Media, an American comic book publisher
- Milestone (Italian company), an Italian video game developer
- Milestones Grill and Bar, a Canadian restaurant chain
- Motorola Milestone, a GSM version of the Android-based smartphone
- Motorola Milestone 2, a GSM version of the Android-based smartphone
- Milestones (video game), a 1981 video game

== People with the surname ==
- Lewis Milestone (1895–1980), Russian-American film director
