= Ultima II: The Revenge of the Enchantress =

1982 video game

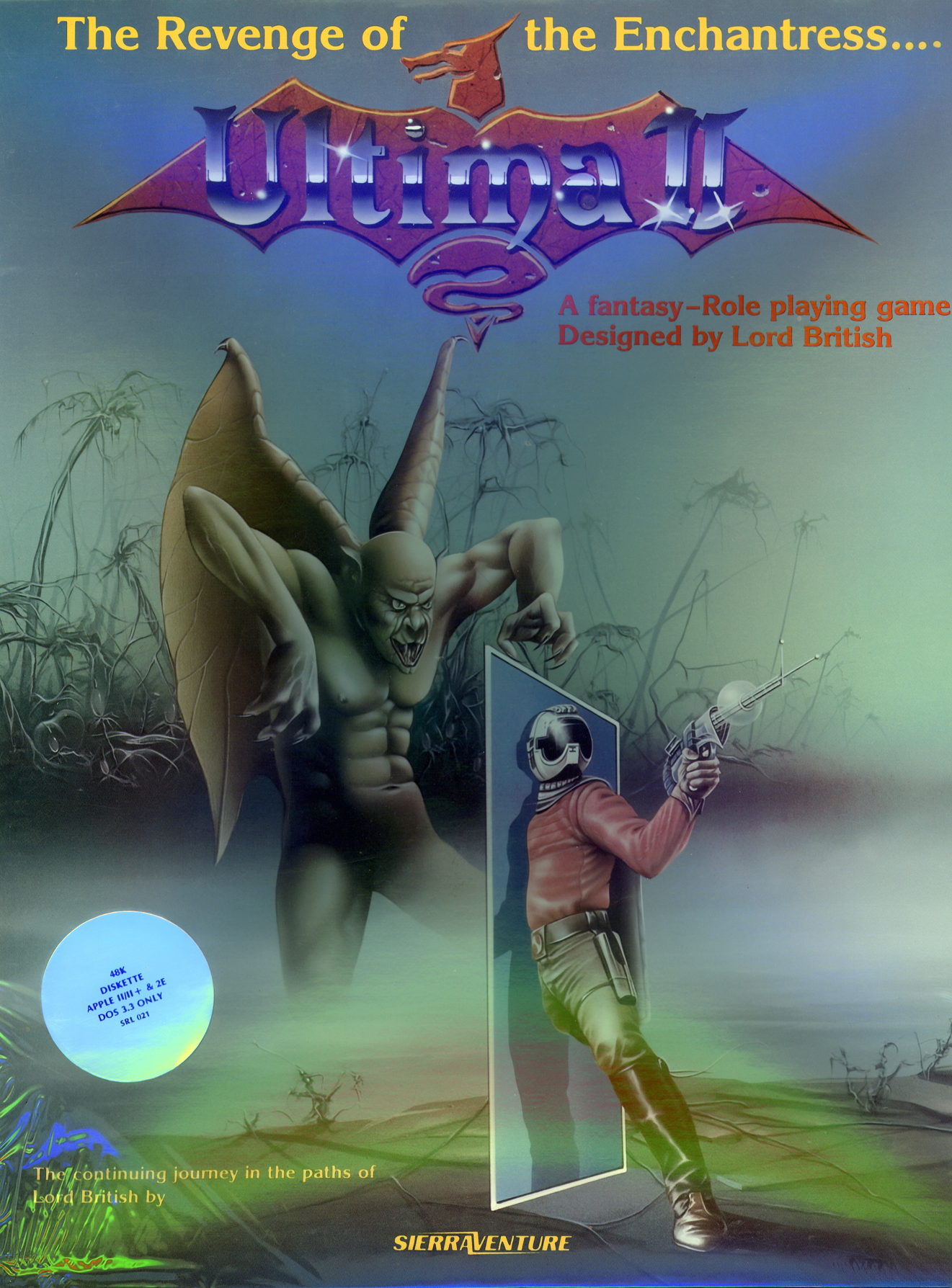
- Developer: Richard Garriott
- Publishers: Sierra On-Line; Origin Systems (re-release)
- Series: Ultima
- Platforms: Apple II, Atari 8-bit, Atari ST, Commodore 64, MS-DOS, FM Towns, FM-7, Mac, MSX2, NEC PC-8801, PC-98
- Release: August 24, 1982
- Genre: Role-playing
- Mode: Single-player

Ultima II: The Revenge of the Enchantress, released on August 24, 1982, for the Apple II (USCO# PA-317-502), is the second role-playing video game in the Ultima series, and the second installment in Ultima's "Age of Darkness" trilogy.

It is also the only official Ultima game published by Sierra On-Line. Conflict with Sierra over royalties for the IBM port of this game led the series creator Richard Garriott to start his own company, Origin Systems.

The plot of Ultima II revolves around the evil enchantress Minax, taking over the world and exacting revenge on the player for the player's defeat of Mondain in Ultima. The player travels through time to acquire the means to defeat Minax and restore the world to peace. Ultima II has a larger game world than Ultima I, and hosts advances in graphics and in gameplay.

== Gameplay ==
The main overhead view. The player is on the Italian Peninsula on Earth in the year 1423 BC. A town is to the west.

The gameplay is very similar to the previous game in the series, Ultima I: The First Age of Darkness. The scope of the game is bigger, in that there are several more places to explore, even though some of them (like most of the Solar System planets and the dungeons and towers) are not required to complete the game.

In the game, the player has to travel to several different time periods of Earth, using time doors. The periods are the Time of Legends (a mythological period), Pangea (about 300 to 250 million years ago), B.C. (1423, "before the dawn of civilization"), A.D. (1990), and the Aftermath (after 2112). The player also has to travel to space, where all the planets in the Solar System can be visited.

== Plot ==
From the game's story, the player learns that the lover of the dark wizard Mondain, the enchantress Minax, is threatening Earth through disturbances in the space-time continuum. The player must guide a hero through time and the Solar System to defeat her evil plot.

The young Minax survived her mentor's and lover's death at the hands of the Stranger (in Ultima I: The First Age of Darkness) and went into hiding. Several years later, Minax got older and very powerful, more so than Mondain once was. Minax wanted to avenge the death of her lover, so she used the time doors created by Mondain's defeat to travel to the Time of Legends, a place located at the origin of times. From there, she sent her evil minions to all the different time eras; she also used her dark powers to disturb the fabric of time and influence men, who ultimately destroyed each other in the far future, nearly wiping out humanity.

Lord British called for a hero to crush Minax's evil plans. The Stranger once again answered British's call. The game begins with the Stranger starting his quest to defeat Minax. Minax's castle, named Shadow Guard, can only be reached through time doors (similar to moongates in the later games); even then an enchanted ring is required to pass unhurt through the force fields inside. The hero hunts down the sorceress to the Time of Legends, pursues her as she teleports throughout the castle, and destroys her with the quicksword Enilno.

Even though Ultima I is set on the fictional land of Sosaria, Ultima II borrowed characters and the story of Ultima I, but relocated them to Earth. Garriott explained from a narrative perspective, Earth needed to be used as a basis for comparison due to the time travel element. Later games in the Ultima series ret-conned this, and assumed that Ultima II actually happened on Sosaria, not Earth, to create a continuity among the games.

== Development ==
Ultima II was Garriott's first program that he wrote completely in assembly language instead of interpreted BASIC. Playing speed and reaction time were vastly improved over the original release of Ultima I. Since Garriott was attending the University of Texas at the time it took him almost two years to create Ultima II, including learning assembly in one month from Tom Luhrs, the author of the popular Apple II arcade game Apple-Oids.

Ultima II was the first game in the series to include a cloth map inside the box, which would become a staple of the franchise. This map, which illustrated how the time doors were linked, was inspired by the one seen in the film Time Bandits, as were the time doors themselves. California Pacific Computer, which published Garriott's first two games, had financial difficulties and did not pay full royalties; when other publishers approached him Garriott insisted on including the map. Sierra On-Line agreed and provided Garriott, who had left the university, with technical assistance as he developed his first major assembly language project. Two versions of this map were produced. The first version is of a heavier and thicker material. This map can be found in the large boxed (8"x11") Apple II and Atari 8-bit versions of the game. Later production runs of the game featured a much smaller box and a lighter weight map.

Despite reservations of Richard Garriott and Chuck Bueche, the original Apple II version of the game was copy-protected using Sierra's new Spiradisc system.

The original Apple Ultima II received an audiovisual upgrade in 1989, bringing its graphics up to date with more recent games in the series much as was done with Ultima I. This "enhanced" version was only available as part of the Ultima Trilogy I-II-III box set released that year and discontinued only months later. (The Commodore and IBM versions of the Ultima Trilogy include the original, unenhanced versions of the game for their respective platforms.)

The game was re-released several times later in CD-ROM PC compilations, including 1998's Ultima Collection. All these re-releases are missing necessary map files for most planets other than Earth; however, the map for "Planet X" is intact and the game is still winnable. Modern (too fast) computers also generate a divide by zero error when attempting to run the game. These issues are addressed with fan patches created by Voyager Dragon, a fan of the series, and are available on his website The Exodus Project. The game is known to run without errors and at an acceptable speed in a DOSBox environment, provided the missing map files are present.

The view of Ultima II when the player enters a town. The improved graphics come from the Ultima 2 Upgrade Patch, found on The Exodus Project website.

Ultima II was the first game in the series officially ported to platforms other than the Apple II.

== Ports ==
=== Atari 8-bit computers ===
The Atari 8-bit version was released in late 1983, several months after the Apple original. The game is mostly a direct port from the Apple II using the computer's high resolution graphics (which works in a similar manner to the Apple II's HGR mode) but does not otherwise take advantage of the Atari's advanced features.

=== Commodore 64 ===
The C64 port was apparently released before the programmer (credited only as "Bobbit") could finish. As a consequence, it is missing some gameplay elements and also has a simplified title screen with text characters instead of the dragon graphic on other versions.

=== IBM PC compatibles ===
The IBM PC version of Ultima II runs under MS-DOS compatible operating systems and supports only the Color Graphics Adapter and PC speaker sound. It uses the CPU for timing, and it will run too fast on anything except an 8088. It is prone to generating divide by zero errors and crashing. The original contract between Garriott and Sierra On-Line didn't include an IBM PC edition, because Garriott considered this system "cumbersome, expensive and underpowered"; he later was disappointed by the contract terms for this port and started thinking about starting his own company.

=== Macintosh ===
In May 1985, Sierra released a port of Ultima II for the Macintosh 128K/512K. Along with Ultima III, this would be the only of the classic Ultima games available for the Macintosh family. The game is compatible with Mac OS versions up to System 6 and will run on System 7.5 with a patch.

=== Atari ST ===
The Atari ST port was one of the earliest commercially released games for the system, coming out shortly after the computer's June 1985 launch. It uses mostly simple block graphics with little enhancement for the ST's hardware capabilities and runs from within TOS, not a self-booting disk as most Atari ST games do.

== Reception ==
Softline in 1983 stated that Ultima II "continues the interplanetary saga with a creative programming flair far beyond the scope of most fantasy or adventure games". The magazine concluded that "Lord British has another, greater hit on his hands ... the ultimate in real-time D&D type fantasy games for the micro". Computer Gaming World in 1983 gave Ultima II a positive review, noting many improvements over its predecessor, particularly in the amount of detail. The magazine praised the large size of the game world, even though little of it is necessary to complete the game, suggesting that additional scenarios would be added leading up to an "Ultimate" quest. In 1991 and 1993 the magazine's Scorpia called it "a good sequel to the original game". K-Power gave the game 7 points out of 10. The magazine described it as "an animated graphic adventure game" and stated that Ultima II "is more sophisticated and has a quicker pace" than its predecessor, with a "fascinating" world. It concluded that the game was "unique and its storyline is original". PC Magazine gave Ultima II 15.5 points out of 18, also praising the game's "great big wonderful world".

Computer Games magazine reviewed the IBM PC conversion, calling it "engrossing and enjoyable." Patricia Fitzgibbons reviewed the Macintosh version of the game for Computer Gaming World, and stated that "Although Ultima II is an exciting – even indispensable – addition to any Mac owner's game library, this version unfortunately contains a number of atrocious misspellings ("paralized," "caugh") and bugs".

Troy Christensen reviewed Ultima II: The Revenge of the Enchantress for Different Worlds magazine and stated that "Ultima II: The Revenge of the Enchantress is a classic fantasy computer adventure game that is a must for anyone serious in computer gaming."

Ultima II sold over 50,000 copies by November 1985, and nearly 100,000 copies by 1990. It was nominated for "Best Adventure Game for Home Computer" at the 1983 Origins Game Fair, losing to Wizardry II: The Knight of Diamonds.
