= Turn-based role-playing game =

Subgenre of role-playing and turn-based video games

A turn-based role-playing game (often abbreviated turn-based RPG or TBRPG) is a subgenre of role-playing video games that utilizes turn-based combat, in contrast to real-time and action role-playing games.

== Definition ==
With a turn-based combat system, the player takes control of characters one at a time, selecting which action for them to take, usually through a menu-based system. This allows the player to think about every move and action they make in game ahead of time and make more strategic plays.

== History ==
=== 1970s ===
The first role-playing video games utilized a turn-based system, which stemmed from their inspiration of pen-and-paper role-playing games like Dungeons & Dragons, in which players would take turns performing actions and rolling to see what would happen. Dungeon, the first-ever RPG video game, which released in 1975, was a text-based game created on a mainframe computer and used turn-based combat. Later on, pedit5 would release in the same year and would utilize graphics instead of text. The game was created at University of Illinois Urbana-Champaign's PLATO computer network and had the player control a character who would explore a dungeon with an overview look. Many regard this to be the first true RPG released, although this is disputed. In 1978, Akalabeth: World of Doom was released for the Apple II and is considered to be the first first-person dungeon crawl RPG. Many other small games like this would be released with different ideas being implemented to see how to properly get the role-playing experience to work on computers.

=== 1980s ===
The 1980s marked an important time for RPGs, as this was the decade where technology was powerful enough to run fully realized role-playing experiences and marked the launch of many influential games. The launch of Ultima I: The First Age of Darkness and Wizardry: Proving Grounds of the Mad Overlord are what helped popularize the genre, not just in the United States, but globally, and especially in Japan. Many of the standard mechanics in turn-based RPGs were created in these games and would go on to become staples of the genre.

While Wizardry was not the first turn-based RPG to be in first person, it was an important release that helped popularize the genre of first person dungeon crawl games. The success led to the game and sequels being ported to numerous computer systems and consoles. In Japan, it introduced many gamers to the genre and helped inspire numerous Japanese developers to create similar RPGs.

The Ultima series also had a similar impact as Wizardry but was more instrumental for laying the groundwork for how RPGs on console would be structured. Many of the mechanics and format of turn-based RPGs came about from the console port of Ultima III: Exodus released in 1983. The design of using tiled graphics with an over the head view were first popularized in these releases. On top of the graphical design, the console ports of the game also featured optimized controls for a better experience on controllers. This would be a trend that would continue for the series with the console ports being significantly different from their PC counterparts in terms of graphics and game control.

Turn-based RPGs would reach a new peak of popularity in 1986 with the release of Dragon Quest, which marked the first time that not just turn-based RPGs, but the whole broader genre as a whole, would become mainstream. What set Dragon Quest apart from previous RPGs was its design that broke away from the roots of tabletop RPGs. Instead designing and creating your own characters along with making choices that would affect the story, the player controlled a character that was pre-designed by the developer and played through a storyline that was linear and straighforward. While the design and gameplay may have been simpler compared to previous games and those on PC, the game laid the groundwork for how RPGs, especially turn-based RPGs, would be designed for a console experience at a time when the way a player controlled the game was different for the platforms. The inspiration of the console releases of Ultima and Wizardry could be seen in Dragon Quest with the player traversing an overworld with an overhead view and battles taking place in first person.

=== 1990s ===
Turn-based RPGs would see a major split occur with certain games becoming exclusive releases on console and PC. No longer was it common for RPGs to release on both platforms, but rather have series that would become exclusive to each platform. This was due to the different perceptions developers had of the player base for each platform, as well as which type of RPG they best enjoyed playing and on which platform. What further made the division unique was the global split in the developers making the games. While both Japanese and Western developers would release games in the same genre regardless of system, the 90s saw Japanese developers only release their TBRPGs on console while Western developers only released theirs on PC. This was a trend that would continue until the mid-2010s when all RPGs (regardless of subgenre) would later be planned and optimized to be played on both platforms.

== Subgenres ==
=== Active time battle RPG ===
Active Time Battle (ATB) refers to a specific type of turn-based mechanic where each action can be performed after a certain amount of time as passed. What makes it different from traditional turn-based is that the time of other characters does not stop and continues even when it is not their turn. The mechanic was introduced by SquareSoft with Final Fantasy IV and since then used in many of their games. Many RPGs not made by SquareSoft (now Square Enix) have used the same system, although not referred to as the ATB system.

=== First-person dungeon crawl ===
The first release in the Wizardry series, Wizardry: Proving Grounds of the Mad Overlord, is considered to be the first release in the subgenre. In it, players traverse dungeons and worlds in entirely in first person as well as battling enemies. The genre stopped being popular on PC towards the end of the 1980s but continued to thrive home consoles like the NES and SNES. Many popular series like Megami Tensei and Phantasy Star started out as first-person dungeon crawlers before transitioning to different mechanics and playstyles.

The subgenre would continue to be popular in Japan through the 90s and 2000s although as a niche subgenre. It wouldn't become mainstream again until the release of Etrian Odyssey for the Nintendo DS. The portability of the console helped make it more enjoyable for players and easier for newcomers to get into.

=== Isometric (CRPG) ===
In the late 1990s, a specific style of turn-based RPGs started to become more popular on PC and led to the subgenre called computer role-playing game (CRPG). CRPGs are usually played from an isometric view and use a point and click interface that is intended to be played with a keyboard and mouse. Because of this, many of these games rarely made it to console as optimizing them for controller use was difficult. This unintended exclusivity led to the games remaining on PC and getting their namesake. The mechanics of these games were closer to traditional tabletop RPGs where players could create their own characters, including their own party members, as well as influence the story and adventure by making choices that would influence the progression of the game.

While this subgenre had its boom in popularity in the late 90s with games like Fallout and Baldur's Gate, the 2010s saw a resurgence with indie developers releasing their own CRPGs like Wasteland 2. The popularity of these indie CRPGs led to major publishers releasing new installments in old series. The biggest release in the subgenre would come years later with Baldur's Gate 3 in 2023. The game would go on to become both a commercial and critical success.

=== Active turn-based RPG ===
An active turn-based RPG, also known as a reactive turn-based RPG, is a subgenre of turn-based role-playing game that combines traditional turn-based decision-making with real-time player actions during combat. These games require the player to actively perform inputs when taking actions or responding to enemy attacks through mechanics such as quick time events, requiring both strategic planning and real-time player input. The term reactive turn-based has been used by Sandfall Interactive, developers of Clair Obscur: Expedition 33, to describe their game's combat system, which blends turn-based commands with real-time defensive and offensive interactions.
