= Leiper =

Leiper is a surname. Notable people with the surname include:

- Charles Leiper Grigg (1868–1940), the inventor of 7 Up (originally SEVEN-UP)
- Dave Leiper (David Paul Leiper, born 1962), a relief pitcher with Major League Baseball's Oakland Athletics
- George Gray Leiper (1786–1868), a member of the U.S. House of Representatives from Pennsylvania
- Henry Smith Leiper (1891–1975), a missionary
- Jack Leiper (John Morton Leiper, 1921–2006), an English cricketer
- Jack Leiper (baseball) (1867–1960), an American professional baseball player
- Joe Leiper, Scottish footballer
- Jeff Leiper, the current Ottawa city councillor for Kitchissippi Ward
- Moira Leiper Ducharme, the first female mayor of Halifax, Nova Scotia (1991–1994)
- Robert Leiper (born 1961), an English cricketer
- Robert Thomson Leiper (1881–1969), a British parasitologist and helminthologist
- Thomas Leiper (1745–1825), a Scottish American merchant and local politician who served in the American Revolutionary War
- Tim Leiper (Timothy Joseph Leiper, born 1966), an American professional baseball coach and manager
- William Leiper (1839-1916), a Scottish architect notable particularly for his domestic architecture in and around the town of Helensburgh

== See also ==
- Leiper Canal, a canal that, in the nineteenth century, ran along Crum Creek in Delaware County, Pennsylvania
- Leiper's Fork, Tennessee, an unincorporated rural village in Williamson County, Tennessee
- Leiper Railroad, a horse drawn railroad that operated between 1810 and 1828 in what is now Nether Providence Township, Delaware County, Pennsylvania
- Leaper (disambiguation)
- Leeper (disambiguation)
