= Super Invader =

1979 video game

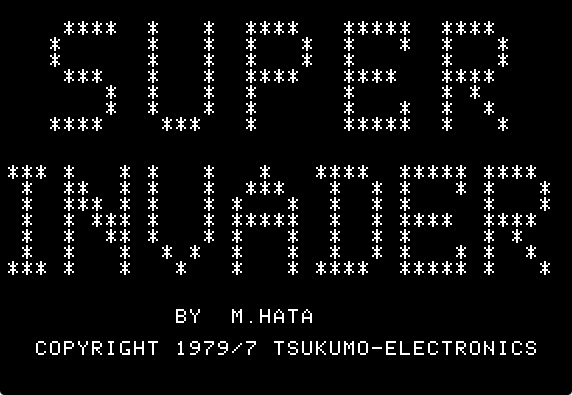
- Title screen
- Developer(s): Astar International Company
- Publisher(s): Creative Computing Software; California Pacific
- Designer(s): M. Hata
- Platform(s): Apple II
- Release: November 1979
- Genre(s): Fixed shooter
- Mode(s): Single-player

Super Invader (also called Super Invasion and Apple Invader) is a fixed shooter video game and a clone of Space Invaders. It was written by Japanese programmer M. Hata for the Apple II and published by Creative Computing Software in November 1979.

It was later published as Cosmos Mission in September 1980 by the California Pacific Computer Company.

== Reception ==
By June 1982, 20,000 copies had been sold to tie with Ultima and Castle Wolfenstein for seventh on Computer Gaming World's list of top sellers. It received the award for "Most Popular Program of 1978–1980 for the Apple Computer" in a Softalk readers poll. The magazine later described the game as the "progenitor of home arcades".

The Comos Mission release debuted at 24 on Softalk's list of bestselling Apple II software.
