= Laf Pak =

1982 video game

- Developer: Chuck Bueche
- Publisher: Sierra On-Line
- Platform: Apple II
- Release: 1982
- Genre: Action

Laf Pak is an Apple II video game developed by Chuck Bueche and published by Sierra On-Line in 1982.

== Contents ==
Chuckles' Laf Pak is a compilation of four action games: Creepy Corridors, Mine Sweep, Apple Zap, and Space Race.

== Reception ==
David H. Ahl for Creative Computing said "All in all, Laf Pak offers a lot of game playing value per dollar, and you are almost sure to find one or more of the games on this disk to your liking."

Softalk said "Four different games, most with recognizable keyboard controls, and each with its own challenges. What to do with all the money you save? Invest in a set of paddles or a joystick if you don't already have one."

Ferrell Wheeler for Hardcore Computist said "Laf Pak is a collection of four small but very enjoyable and playable games."
