= Tsunami (video game) =

1981 video game

- Developer(s): Rodney McAuley
- Publisher(s): Creative Computing Software
- Platform(s): Apple II
- Release: 1981

Tsunami is a 1981 video game published by Creative Computing Software.

== Gameplay ==
Tsunami is a game in which the player must defend against alien attacks.

== Reception ==
Bob Proctor reviewed the game for Computer Gaming World, stating that: "For those who like "Invader" games, Tsunami will be of great interest due to [its] variety and professional quality."
