= Leaper =

Leaper(s) may refer to:

- Adrian Leaper (born 1953), English conductor of classical music
- Roy Leaper (1906–2002), Australian rules footballer
- Tom Leaper (born 1975), Australian racing cyclist
- Wes Leaper (1900–1958), American football player
- Batroc the Leaper, fictional villain from Marvel Comics
- Leapers, fairy chess pieces that move by a fixed type of vector between their start squares and their arrival squares
- Little Leaper, amusement ride located in Altoona, Pennsylvania, USA
- "The Leaper", brand logo of Jaguar Cars as well as the name of the banned, iconic hood ornament
- Water leaper, a creature from Welsh folklore
- A person born on February 29

== See also ==
- Leeper (disambiguation)
- Leiper (a surname)
- Leape (disambiguation)
