= Reginald Leeper =

British civil servant and diplomat

Sir Reginald Leeper
- Born: 25 March 1888
- Died: 2 February 1968 (aged 79)
- Occupations: civil servant and diplomat

Sir Reginald "Rex" Wilding Allen Leeper GBE KCMG (25 March 1888 – 2 February 1968) was a British civil servant and diplomat. He was the founder of the British Council.

Leeper was the son of Dr Alexander Leeper, the first Warden of Trinity College, the University of Melbourne, and his wife Adeline (née Allen). His half-sister Valentine Leeper (1900–2001), maintained a lifelong correspondence with him.

Leeper began his government career in 1915, when he joined the News Department of the Foreign Office. Following admin changes in 1916 he was transferred to Intelligence Bureau, which in 1918 became the Political Intelligence Department. He contributed to the weekly review The New Europe under the pseudonym Rurik. In 1920 he moved to the Northern Department of the FO. In 1923 Leeper was transferred to Diplomatic Service and moved to Warsaw as secretary of the legation. He served in Poland until the early 1930s, though exact date of his return to the UK is not clear.

He then served as the chief of the news department of the Foreign Office, which via such organs as the British Council, the British Library of Information, the Travel Association and the foreign language broadcasts of the BBC sought to influence public opinion abroad. Leeper was appointed assistant undersecretary of state with a special brief for propaganda in early 1938. Much of his time was taken up with preparations for the British exhibition for the 1939 World's Fair in New York. A major problem with propaganda in the United States in 1938 was the work of the House Committee on Un-American Activities (HCUAC) headed by a xenophobic congressman from Texas, Martin Dies, which in 1938 started an investigation into allegations of British propaganda. In June 1938, Lord Lloyd of the British Council suggested sending British professors to American universities with the aim of influencing American undergraduates, a plan supported by Leeper and Sir Robert Vansittart, the Special Adviser on Foreign Policy. The ambassador to the United States, Sir Ronald Lindsay, fearing the HCUAC, vetoed this plan, writing in a letter to Leeper on 10 July 1938 that the possibility of Dies discovering the plan was too much and asked Leeper "what they were at". In an attempt to circumvent Lindsay, Leeper called a meeting in London to discuss how to engage in propaganda in the United States. Besides Leeper, the meeting was attended by Lord Lothian, the secretary of the Rhodes Trust; Angus Fletcher of the British Library of Information; the Labour MP Josiah Wedgewood; and Frank Darvall of the English-Speaking Union. He became head of Britain's Political Intelligence Department when it reformed in 1939.

Leeper was the British ambassador to the Greek government 1943–46 (in exile in Cairo until October 1944). He played a critical role in Greek political developments of 1944, especially in support of the Greek monarchy in the person of King George II of Greece. After Greece's liberation, Leeper continued to be one of the major power brokers during his tenure, which included the early stages of the Greek Civil War.

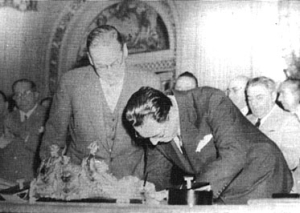
Leeper (left) in Buenos Aires in March 1948 watching President Juan Perón (right) sign the instrument that nationalised British-owned railways in Argentina.

Leeper was then British ambassador to Argentina from 1946 to 1948. In February 1948 he and a UK trade mission led by Clive Baillieu secured a new trade agreement with Argentina. It was signed on 7 February in the Port of Buenos Aires at a reception aboard the Royal Mail Lines flagship RMS Andes.

His brother, Alexander Wigram Allen Leeper, was also a distinguished British diplomat.

== Books and articles ==
- Cull, Nicholas (1999). "The Munich Crisis and the British Propaganda Policy in the United States". In Igors Lukes; Erik Goldstein (eds.). The Munich Crisis, 1938. London: Frank Cass. pp. 216–235.
- Nicol, Stuart (2001). MacQueen's Legacy; Ships of the Royal Mail Line. Vol. Two. Brimscombe Port and Charleston, SC: Tempus Publishing. p. 174. ISBN 0-7524-2119-0.
- Poynter, John (1997). Doubts and Certainties: A Life of Alexander Leeper. Melbourne University Press.
- Poynter, Marion (2008). Nobody's Valentine: Letters in the Life of Valentine Alexa Leeper, 1900–2001. Miegunyah Press & Trinity College, University of Melbourne.
