= Air Traffic Controller (video game) =

- Publisher: Creative Computing
- Designer: David Mannering
- Platforms: TRS-80, Apple II, Exidy Sorcerer, MS-DOS, Sol-20
- Release: TRS-80, Sol-20: WW: 1978; Apple II, Sorcerer: WW: 1979; MS-DOS: WW: 1983

Air Traffic Controller is a video game written by air traffic controller David Mannering. It was released by Creative Computing for the TRS-80 Model I and Exidy Sorcerer in 1978, and for the Apple II and Sol-20 in 1979. It was rewritten by Will Fastie and Bill Appelbaum for Data General AOS in 1980 and ported to MS-DOS for release by PC Disk Magazine in 1983.

An enhanced version, Advanced Air Traffic Controller, was published by Creative Computing in 1981 for the TRS-80, Apple II, Commodore PET, and Atari 8-bit computers.

== Gameplay ==
Air Traffic Controller is a game in which the player directs local air traffic.

== Reception ==
Alan Isabelle reviewed Air Traffic Controller in The Space Gamer, commenting that it was "Unquestionably worth [the price]. I highly recommend this to anyone with the computer to run it.".

== See also ==
- Kennedy Approach
