= Micro Golf =

1981 video game

- Developer: Creative Computing Software
- Publisher: Creative Computing Software
- Platform: Apple II
- Release: 1981
- Genre: Sports

Micro Golf is a sports video game published in 1981 by Creative Computing Software for the Apple II.

== Gameplay ==
Micro Golf is a game in which 1 to 4 players play miniature golf.

== Reception ==
Bob Boyd reviewed the game for Computer Gaming World, and stated that "One of the best features of this game is that it is not limited to a special age or interest group. It is great for showing people your computer because there aren't hefty rules to learn, you can just start playing, and it is still very challenging for everyone."

It was reviewed by Creative Computing.
