= Lucie Barbier =

French pianist and singer (1875–1963)

- Born: 1875; Besançon
- Died: 17 October 1963; Utica
- Spouse(s): André Barbier, Alfred Eckhard Zimmern

Lucie Anna Elisabeth Olympe Barbier (née Hirsch; 1875–1963), also known as Lucie Zimmern, was a French pianist and singer, as well as a cultural diplomat.

Lucie Barbier moved to Britain in 1902 after marrying her first husband, and they both taught at University College of Wales, Bangor, Manchester University and University of Wales, Aberystwyth. Alongside teaching music, Barbier organised concerts, particularly featuring French composers and traditional Welsh music. Whilst at Aberystwyth, Barbier left her husband for a colleague and moved to Geneva with her second husband, Alfred Zimmern. In the 1920s and 30s, Lucie and Alfred Zimmern ran the Geneva School of International Studies (often called the Zimmern School). They moved to the USA in 1947, where they founded the Hartford Study Centre for World Affairs.

Lucie believed in music's role in internationalism, writing in the Guardian in 1911, "I feel convinced that music will contribute to bring peace in the world." She was interested in building relations between countries, often using music, and was involved in the Entente Cordiale in 1904 as well as the League of Nations while living in Geneva, writing a book called Must the League Fail? in 1932.

== Early life ==
Lucie Hirsch was born in Besançon, France in 1875, the daughter of Olympe Flotron and Maurice Hirsch.

She attended school at the Lycée Molière and studied music at the Sorbonne, specialising in soparano and piano.

== Career ==
She sang in England for the first time at the Royal Albert Hall in 1901, accompanied by Cécile Chaminade on piano.

After her marriage in 1902, she began lecturing at the University College of Wales, Bangor, where, in 1903, she performed as lead vocalist in Samuel Coleridge-Taylor's Death of Minnehaha.

She moved to Manchester in 1903 and began working at Manchester University. In Manchester, she became involved in the Entente Cordiale. She became the Executive Secretary of Manchester's La Société des Concerts Français, organising eights concerts in Manchester between December 1907 and March 1909, which concentrated on chamber and instrumental music. They included performances by Fauré, Debussy and D'Indy alongside British composers and performers.

In 1909, Lucie Barbier began lecturing at the University of Wales, Aberystwyth, teaching French music, singing and conducting. In 1910, she established the University of Wales Musical Club.

In 1910, Arthur Somervell wrote to Lucie for her opinion on a piano and orchestra piece prior to its first performance that went on to become his work Normandy. These letters are in the archives of the National Library of Wales.

In March 1911, she organised, directed and accompanied a series of six concerts over four days of a vocal quartet (including Dora Herbert Jones) performing traditional Welsh folk music in Paris. The pieces were arranged by J. Lloyd Williams. This was the first time that performances of Welsh music were heard in France.

In 1914, she founded the Department of Instrumental Music at Aberystwyth University, with funding from Gwendolen and Margaret Davies, that employed five French musicians.

In 1919, she met Alfred Zimmern, who had recently become Professor of International Politics at Aberystwyth, and they became romantically involved. They were both forced to resign, and she became Lucie Zimmern.

Lucie Zimmern, alongside Alfred, gave speeches around the UK, the USA, Canada, Australia and New Zealand on folk songs and Anglo-French relations, as well as the role of women in international relations. They also hosted salons in their various homes in Ithica, Geneva, Paris, Oxford and Hartford, as well as Lucie hosting study groups for women and Alfred for men.

In 1923, the Zimmerns founded the Geneva School of International Studies, often referred to as the Zimmern School. Lucie ran the school's day-to-day activities and employed her eldest daughter's husband, her youngest daughter and Alfred's older sister. At its peak in 1925–1926, almost 600 students attended the school. It ran at the Geneva Graduate Institute until 1939.

Lucie taught a subject called "Mrs Zimmern" at the Zimmern School. She lectured on music, education and internationalism. She also organised music recitals and group singing.

In 1932, Lucie Zimmern published a book called Must the League Fail? after helping to organise the League of Nations' 1927 World Population Conference.

The Zimmerns emigrated to the USA in 1947, after Lucie falsely accused Julian Huxley, the first director general of UNESCO, of being a communist, leading to Alfred being side-lined by the organisation.

There they founded a new school, attempting to recreate the Zimmern School, known as the Hartford Study Centre for World Affairs. While both co-directed the school, Alfred crossed out Lucie's name as a founder, and she was often omitted in texts about the school.

== Personal life ==
In 1902, Lucie married André Barbier, a French scholar. They had two daughters, Edith (born in 1903) and Evelyn (born in 1908). They divorced shortly before her second marriage.

In March 1920, Lucie married Alfred Zimmern. He died in 1957.

== Death ==
Lucie Zimmern died aged 88 at a nursing home in Utica on 17 October 1963.
