= John J. Anderson =

American computer journalist

- Born: November 8, 1956; New Jersey, United States
- Died: October 17, 1989 (aged 32); San Francisco, California, United States
- Occupations: Writer, editor
- Years active: 1983–1989
- Known for: Executive Editor of Computer Shopper and Atari Explorer; Technology journalism
- Notable work: "Apple Cart" column in Creative Computing "Outpost Atari" column
- Spouse: Lauren Hallquist Anderson
- Children: 2

John J. Anderson (November 8, 1956 – October 17, 1989), or J.J. Anderson, was a writer and editor covering computers and technology. The New Jersey native was Executive Editor of Computer Shopper and Atari Explorer. At the time of his death he was an editor for MacUser magazine in Foster City, California.

John began writing the "Apple Cart" column in Creative Computing magazine in January 1983 after David Lubar left to work for a video game company in California. He followed this with the "Outpost Atari" column in the same magazine. John would become Creative's Executive Editor, working alongside founding editors David Ahl and Betsy Staples.

== Death and legacy ==
John and fellow MacUser editor Derek van Alstyne were killed in San Francisco during the 1989 Loma Prieta earthquake. They were visiting the city for a business meeting when the front of a building collapsed, burying his car in debris from a brick wall. MacUser named two of its annual Editors' Choice Awards, celebrating distinguished achievement and up-and-coming talent, respectively, after the pair. On October 31, 1989, the John Anderson Memorial Fund was established by Ziff Davis as a trust fund for John's two children. Bill Ziff, President of Ziff, personally contributed $50,000.
