= Learning with FuzzyWOMP =

1984 educational video game

- Developer: Sierra On-Line
- Publisher: Sierra On-Line
- Designers: Michael Mckee; Martin Shen
- Programmers: Michael Mckee; Martin Shen
- Platform: Apple II
- Release: 1984
- Genre: Educational

Learning with FuzzyWOMP is an educational math game aimed at preschoolers. It was published by Sierra On-Line in 1984 for the Apple II. The game is similar to Learning with Leeper (1983).

== History ==
In 1984, Sierra On-Line added three programs to their line of educational software with Wizard of Id's Touch Type, Story Maker, and Learning with Fuzzywomp".

== Gameplay ==
Mobygames describes the gameplay: "There are four kinds of education as different games for kids. They include knowledge and order of the digits (the digits as smoke fly out from a pipe, and you must help FuzzyWOMP to blow them out in proper order); digit definition (clown shows the digit and FuzzyWOMP have to roll so many balls down - if number is proper then clown juggles with them else he is upset); calculating, comparing, or memorizing (the domino shows and then hides, and FuzzyWOMP have to choose the same from the six possible variants); shooting (after creating your assistant you have to shoot FuzzyWOMP)."

Creative Computing (Volume 10, Number 4) explained: "Learning with Fuzzywomp includes four games for pre-readers which teach such basic skills as pattern matching, counting, number sequencing, and creative play. No adult supervision is required to play this game, which is available for the Apple and sells for $29.95."

RedKingsDreams argues the game teaches the following skills: goal seeking, contextual understanding, symbolic logic, and numerical literacy.

== Reception ==
Vintage Sierra wrote "This collection of four animated learning games is tailored to meet the needs of the child who cannot read; no words are used. Just show your child how to use the joystick and Fuzzywomp will demonstrate each game." Commenting on how her 3-year old daughter reacted to Learning with Fuzzywomp, Evan Stubbs of RedKingsDream concluded: "An interesting game from the early days of Sierra – there's no text in the entire game, encouraging her to learn goals through symbolic representation. She makes the intuitive leap to what she needs to do by watching what the game shows her (without any explanation that that's what she's supposed to be looking for). Apart from that, it focuses on basic image recognition and counting."

Learning with FuzzyWOMP received a Parent's Choice Award for ages 3–6.
