= Bill Budge's Space Album =

1980 video game collection

- Publisher: California Pacific
- Programmer: Bill Budge
- Platform: Apple II
- Release: March 1980
- Genre: Action
- Mode: Single-player

Bill Budge's Space Album is a collection of four Apple II action games written by Bill Budge and published by California Pacific Computer Company in 1980.

== Games ==
The games are Death Star, Asteroids, Tail Gunner, and Solar Shootout. Death Star was based around a scenario similar to the Death Star "trench battle" that formed the climax of the 1977 film, Star Wars Episode IV: A New Hope. Asteroids was a variant of the popular arcade video game of the same name.

== Reception ==
Alan Isabelle reviewed Bill Budge's Space Album in The Space Gamer No. 33. Isabelle wrote that "the first three games are very entertaining. Graphics and sound effects are first rate [...] I recommend this package to any arcade game fan with an Apple".

Ian Chadwick reviewed Bill Budge's Space Album in Ares Magazine #11 and commented that "despite the simplicity of the games, this is exciting stuff and lots of fun to play. The highlight of the game is Budge's graphics, which continue to improve with each game he produces. It's a game of paddles and fast reflexes, and having four games in one package allows a lot of variation in one sitting. Good stuff and well worth the money".
