= Political Intelligence Department (1939–1943) =

British Foreign Office department (World War II)

The Political Intelligence Department was a department of the British Foreign Office during World War II. Established in 1939, its main function was the production of weekly intelligence summaries. It was originally headed by Foreign Office diplomat Rex Leeper.

In April 1943, the department was merged with the Royal Institute of International Affairs' Foreign Research and Press Service in Oxford, creating the new Foreign Office Research Department.

The 'Political Intelligence Department' name continued to exist until 1946 as a cover for the Political Warfare Executive.

== See also ==
- Political Intelligence Department (1918–1920)
