= Autoduel =

1985 video game

- Developer: Origin Systems
- Publisher: Origin Systems
- Designers: Chuck Bueche; Richard Garriott
- Platforms: Amiga, Apple II, Atari 8-bit, Atari ST, Commodore 64, MS-DOS, Macintosh
- Release: 1985: Apple, Atari 8-bit, C64, MS-DOS; 1987: Atari ST; 1988: Amiga, Mac
- Genre: Role-playing
- Mode: Single-player

Autoduel is a role-playing video game published by Origin Systems for the Atari 8-bit computers, Commodore 64, Apple II, and IBM PC compatibles in 1985. It was released in 1987 for the Atari ST and in 1988 for the Amiga and Macintosh. The game is based on the Steve Jackson Games series Car Wars.

Autoduel is set in the United States in 2030, where cars are a primary means of protection and defense, and the highways are dangerous stretches of land ruled by gangs and vigilantes with armed vehicles.

== Gameplay ==
Gameplay screenshot (Atari ST)

The player creates a character, names them and distributes 50 points between three skills: driving, marksmanship and mechanic. The player's character starts in New York, on Friday 1-1-2030. Without a car, the player has to enter "amateur night" where they are provided a vehicle in order to raise enough money to buy and equip their own. With their own vehicle, a character can begin performing courier missions between the various towns along the Atlantic seaboard—including Syracuse, Boston, Manchester (Origin's headquarters at the time, which could be visited in the game) and Atlantic City among a few. The character may also enter more distinguished Arena events to earn money as well as travel the highways to fight the other cars and salvage their parts. In this sense, the game was very open-ended in what the player could do. The game also had a storyline, involving certain critical courier tasks, such as carrying important criminal evidence against "Mr. Big", through the dangerous terrain between cities.

The main feature of the game is combat involving customized vehicles. The vehicle construction in the game allows a variety of power plants, guns, ammunition, mine-layers, smokescreens, oil slicks and rockets to be arranged onto an even larger selection of body and chassis types.

The game was developed using a top-down perspective and features two distinct setting areas: the arena or highway style area and the city area. The highway and arenas allow acceleration and driving skills to be used in a scrolling screen format, while the city area is a single screen where stores and other attractions of a city can be visited.

== Reception ==
Computer Gaming World in 1986 reviewed the game positively, noting, "The game design is clean, the graphics excellent and no bugs were found." The immense difficulty of the game was noted, as was the long learning curve. In emphasis, the review suggested bypassing the permanent death feature of the game and expensive in-game clones (backup saves) by making a copy of the character disk, to return to in case of character death. In 1992 and 1994 surveys of science fiction games, the magazine gave the title two of five stars, writing that "Graphic and game play now appear very dated". Compute! stated that Autoduel combined role-playing, arcade, and strategy features, calling it "more than a game—it's a complete system of play ... overall game play is excellent". The review concluded with "highly recommended". Game reviewers Hartley and Pattie Lesser commented on the game in their "The Role of Computers" column in Dragon #120 (1987), noting that the game "combines the feel of the Road Warrior movies with the fantasy role-playing action of the Ultima adventure games."

Steve Fuelleman reviewed Autoduel in Space Gamer/Fantasy Gamer No. 78. Fuelleman stated "The game is pretty well conceived, but is marred by just enough technical flaws, substandard graphics, frustrating limitations, and general user unfriendliness that it just isn't much fun to play."

According to Bueche, Autoduel was his only successful game.

== Legacy ==
In 2018, Steve Jackson posted a public request for the Autoduel source code, writing "We'd really like to republish Autoduel in more or less its classic form, updated for modern systems."

== See also ==
- Auto Assault
- Darkwind: War on Wheels
- Interstate '76
- Roadwar 2000
