= Spiradisc =

Floppy disk copy protection system

Spiradisc (often misspelled as "Spiradisk") was a copy protection scheme used by Sierra On-Line on their floppy disk releases for the Apple II. The technique, developed by Mark Duchaineau, involved writing the data on spiralling paths on the disk rather than in concentric circles. Initially, no commercial copying software or bit nibbler could successfully copy the disks it was applied to.

Games which used Spiradisc copy protection include Lunar Leepers, Frogger, some very early versions of Ultima II, Jawbreaker, Maze Craze Construction Set, and Pest Patrol.

Eventually, Copy II Plus version 5 was able to successfully defeat this copy protection.
