= Apple-Oids =

1980 video game

- Developer: California Pacific
- Publisher: California Pacific
- Programmer: Tom Luhrs
- Platform: Apple II
- Release: WW: 1980
- Genre: Multidirectional shooter

Apple-Oids (also written as Apple-oids) is a clone of Atari, Inc.'s Asteroids arcade video game. It was written by Tom Luhrs for the Apple II and published by California Pacific Computer Company in 1980. The asteroids in Apple-oids are in the shape of apples.

== Gameplay ==
The ship is rotated with the paddle knob and propelled forward with the paddle button. Firing is done via the keyboard, with the asterisk key. Pressing any other key warps the ship to a random location—a.k.a. hyperspace.

== Reception ==
Forrest Johnson reviewed Apple-Oids in The Space Gamer No. 42. Johnson commented that "I have never figured out why anyone would send a perfectly good ship to shoot at asteroids, but if that's your scene, you will enjoy this game".

In a Creative Computing review alongside The Asteroid Field and Asteron, the authors concluded: "For those who like Asteroids, any of these three games is a good choice".
