= The New Europe =

The New Europe, subtitled "A Weekly Review of Foreign Politics," was a weekly political magazine published in the United Kingdom between 1916 and 1920.

Funded by David Davies, it spread ideas related to federalism, such as the emancipation of various Slavic nations from the Central Powers. It was founded by the political activist and historian Robert William Seton-Watson, Henry Wickham Steed, Ronald Montagu Burrows and Frederic William Whyte, with the help of Tomáš Garrigue Masaryk. Others involved with the magazine included Erskine Childers, Anatole France, the brothers Reginald "Rex" Leeper and Allen Leeper, Oscar Browning, James Frazer, Bernard Pares, Samuel Hoare, Leonard Woolf and Salvador de Madariaga.

== Bibliography ==
- Cabo Aseguinolaza, Fernando (2009). "Madariaga Rojo, Salvador de". Diccionario Biográfico Español (in Spanish). Vol. XXXI: De “López de Vega” a “Manfredi Cano”. Real Academia de la Historia. ISBN 978-84-96849-87-7.
- Clogg, Richard (2013). Politics and the Academy: Arnold Toynbee and the Koraes Chair. Routledge. ISBN 9781135175986.
- D'Agostino, Anthony (2011). The Rise of Global Powers: International Politics in the Era of the World Wars. Cambridge University Press. ISBN 9781139498197.
- Goldstein, Erik (1998). "Great Britain: The Home Front". In Manfred F. Boemeke, Gerald D. Feldman y Elisabeth Gläser (ed.). The Treaty of Versailles: A Reassessment After 75 Years. Cambridge University Press. pp. 147–166. ISBN 9780521621328.
- Passerini, Luisa (1999). Europe in Love, Love in Europe: Imagination and Politics in Britain Between the Wars. I.B.Tauris. ISBN 9781860642814.
- Roshwald, Aviel (2002). Ethnic Nationalism and the Fall of Empires: Central Europe, the Middle East and Russia, 1914-23. Routledge. ISBN 9781134682546.
- Taylor, Philip M. (1981). The Projection of Britain: British Overseas Publicity and Propaganda, 1919-1939. CUP Archive. ISBN 9780521238434.
- The New Europe archive at HathiTrust
