= Action & Bumping Games =

- Publisher(s): Creative Computing
- Platform(s): Apple II
- Release: 1981
- Genre(s): Compilation

Action & Bumping Games is a collection of video games published by Creative Computing in 1981.

== Contents ==
Action & Bumping Games is a package of six games for the Apple II, including Bumper Blocks, Obstacle Course, Hustle Jr., Cycle Jump, Mine Rover, and Road Machine. Three of these games were considered Hi-Res action games, and the other three are Lo-Res bumping games. Each of these games involves eye-hand coordination, and feature many difficulty levels.

== Development ==
Bumper Blocks and Obstacle Course were programmed by David Lubar.

Mine Rover is an early precursor to Minesweeper. Mine Rover and Road Machine were released in a 1981 compilation called Action Games with another game called Cycle Jump.

== Reception ==
Forrest Johnson reviewed Action & Bumping Games in The Space Gamer No. 41. Johnson commented that "It is hard to find anything to criticize about this package. The worst I can say is, some of these games are highly addictive. God knows why we play these things - but if you enjoy arcade games, you will like these."

The Book Of Apple Computer Software 1982 said that "Overall, the game package is average in quality but nonetheless a good buy for a beginning game collector."
