= Space and Sport Games =

1980 video game

- Publisher(s): Creative Computing
- Release: 1980

Space and Sport Games is a 1980 collection of video games published by Creative Computing.

== Contents ==
Space and Sport Games is a compilation of nine simple games, three of which have a space theme.

== Reception ==
Bruce F. Webster reviewed Space and Sport Games in The Space Gamer No. 35. Webster commented that "There are nine games in all on this diskette, all of the same quality. I suspect all nine were placed there because the folks at Creative Computing couldn't justify selling them in smaller groups. I'm not sure they can justify selling them in this large group. Don't buy it."
