= Alice Zimmern =

English writer and suffragist (1855–1939)

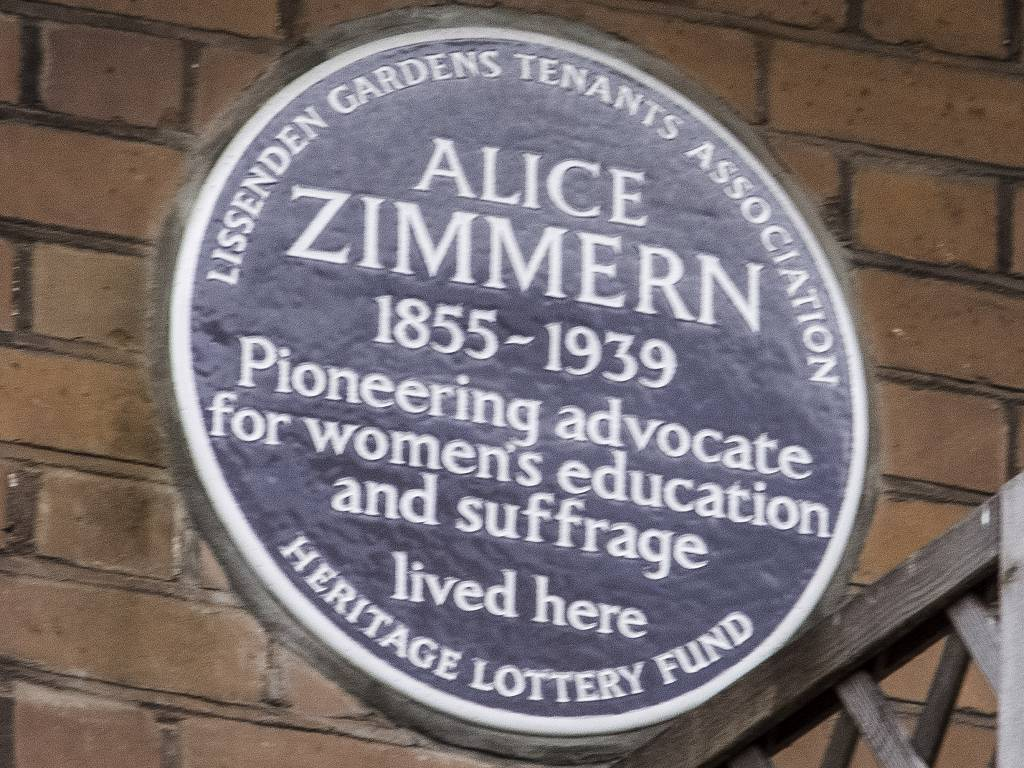
Alice Zimmern Plaque in London

Alice Louisa Theodora Zimmern (22 September 1855 – 22 March 1939) was an English writer, translator, and suffragist. Her books made a significant contribution to debate on the education and rights of women.

== Early years and education ==
Zimmern was born at Postern Street, Nottingham, Nottinghamshire. She was the youngest of three daughters of the lace merchant Hermann Theodore Zimmern, a German Jewish immigrant, and his wife Antonia Marie Therese Regina Zimmern, née Leo, sister of Carl Leo, a syndic of Hamburg. The scholar and political scientist Alfred Eckhard Zimmern was one of her cousins.

Zimmern was educated at a private school and at Bedford College, London, before entering Girton College, Cambridge in 1881 to read Classics. Zimmern left Girton in 1885 with honours in both parts of the Cambridge classical tripos. In 1888–1894, she taught English and Classics at English girls' schools, including Tunbridge Wells High School (1888–1891). In addition to this, she translated Greek texts in order for them to be used by her students.

== Career ==
While teaching, Zimmern produced a school edition of the Meditations of Marcus Aurelius in 1887, a translation of Hugo Bluemner's The Home Life of the Ancient Greeks (1893), and a translation of Porphyry: The Philosopher to his Wife Marcella (1896). She later wrote children's books on ancient Greece (Greek History for Young Readers, 1895, Old Tales from Greece, 1897) and Rome (Old Tales from Rome, 1906), all of which were reprinted several times. Greek History for Young Readers was still being praised in the Parents' Review six years later.

In 1893, she and four other women were awarded Gilchrist scholarships to study the US education system. They were: Miss A. Bramwell, B.Sc., Lecturer at the Cambridge Training College; Miss S. A. Burstall, B.A., Mistress at the North London Collegiate School for Girls; Miss H. M. Hughes, Lecturer on Education at University College, Cardiff; Miss Mary Hannah Page, Head Mistress of the Skinners Company's School for Girls, Stamford Hill. Each woman received £100 to pursue their studies in the US for two months.

This resulted in her book Methods of Education in America (1894), in which she praised the articulacy of American school students and their enthusiasm for classic English literature, but noted that their written work and their textbooks were of a poor standard and the teaching of American history ludicrously patriotic.

Zimmern ceased to teach in schools in 1894, but continued to tutor private students. She regularly wrote journal articles on comparative education and the education of women. Her book Women's Suffrage in Many Lands (1909) appeared to coincide with the Fourth Congress of the International Women's Suffrage Alliance. This book and The Renaissance of Girls' Education (1898) made big contributions to the debate on the education and rights of women in Zimmern's time. In the former she noted an "intimate... connexion between enfranchisement and the just treatment of women." While most of her arguments are moderate and pragmatic, she acknowledges the militant tactics of British suffragettes as effective in making women's suffrage "the question of the day". In the contrary, she was a pacifist. In addition, Zimmern partook in the 1908 Great Procession, riding in a car with the Women's Franchise logo. Zimmern was noted to chair and speak at many suffrage meetings.

Much of Zimmern's research was done in the British Museum Reading Room, where she associated with suffragists and Fabians such as Edith Bland, Eleanor Marx, and Beatrice Potter. Other works by Zimmern include Demand and Achievement, The International Women's Suffrage Movement (1912), a translation of Paul Kajus von Hoesbroech's Fourteen Years a Jesuit (1911), and Gods and Heroes of the North (1907). Zimmern also supported the creation of the first library of international feminism as she oversaw the library at the International Women's Franchise Club in Grafton Street in Central London.

Resident in Hampstead in her later years, Zimmern was limited in her capacity to travel in the last decades of her life, although she remained interested in the rights of women and in pacifism, and continued to entertain many visitors from abroad. She was limited by her arthritis. Her last work was a translation of The Origins of the War (1917) by Take Ionescu. She was unmarried and died at her home, 45 Clevedon Mansions, Highgate Road, London, on 22 March 1939. Her funeral took place in Kentish Town and she was buried at Abney Park Cemetery. Where she was buried with her parents and Eliza Mabbutt, her father's housekeeper in his widowerhood. She left £150 to Girton College to establish the Alice Zimmern Memorial Prize in Classics.
