= 2400 A.D. =

1988 video game

- Developer: Origin Systems
- Publisher: Origin Systems
- Designer: Chuck Bueche
- Platforms: Apple II, MS-DOS
- Release: 1988
- Genre: Role-playing
- Mode: Single-player

2400 A.D. is a role-playing video game designed by Chuck Bueche and published by Origin Systems in 1988. It was originally released for the Apple II with a version for IBM PC compatibles later the same year.

== Plot ==
The game's post-apocalyptic scenario casts the player as a member of an underground resistance organization trying to free the human inhabitants of planet XK-120 from the clutches of a tyrannical race of alien oppressors.

The player is an ordinary citizen who lives in the futuristic city Metropolis. The city has been conquered, and its population enslaved by an alien race known as Tzorgs that have sent robots to maintain order in Metropolis, turning it into a police state. There are rumors of an underground resistance movement, but finding the resistance is dangerous. The ultimate aim is to destroy the robots' central control.

== Gameplay ==
The gameplay style is similar to the Ultima series, also from Origin Systems. The entire game is viewed from top-down perspective. The various commands (search, open, talk, etc.) are executed by pressing a correspondent key on the keyboard. Battles take place on the same screen as exploration, and require the player to press A (for "attack") and a directional key to aim at the enemy. The game is set entirely in the big city, with streets and buildings to explore, items and weapons to buy, and people to talk to.

== Release ==
In addition to a large fold out city map, 2400 A.D. was packaged with a set of three lead figurines. All three depict heavily armed robot soldiers and were cast by Grenadier Miniatures.

A Commodore 64 port was in development by John Romero, but was shelved due to poor sales of the original Apple II version. Romero left Origin in June 1988. The Commodore 64 port was once again resurrected and Ocean Software programmer Allan Shortt worked on the port, but it was shelved at 85% complete. Poor sales also resulted in the cancellation of the sequel, 2500 A.D.

== Reception ==
Computer Gaming World's Scorpia in 1988 criticized 2400 A.D.'s graphics and several other flaws with the game's structure and plot. She concluded "the game lacks intensity and is a disappointment. There are practically no puzzles, and hardly any challenge." In 1993, Scorpia called 2400 A.D. "a science fiction cartoon pretending to be a real game" that "may be good for a summer afternoon or rainy day when you want something that isn't mentally taxing or especially involving."

== Legacy ==
Bueche developed a sequel titled 2500 A.D., but it was halted in development because of poor sales of 2400 A.D.
