= Alfred Eckhard Zimmern =

English scholar and political scientist (1879–1957)

- Born: 26 January 1879; Surbiton, Surrey, U.K.
- Died: 24 November 1957 (aged 78); Avon, Connecticut, U.S.
- Education: Winchester College
- Alma mater: New College, Oxford
- Occupations: Classical scholar, historian
- Spouse: Lucie Barbier (married 1920)

Sir Alfred Eckhard Zimmern (26 January 1879 – 24 November 1957) was an English classical scholar, historian, and political scientist writing on international relations. A British policymaker during World War I and a prominent liberal thinker, Zimmern played an important role in drafting the blueprint for what would become the League of Nations.

He was the inaugural Woodrow Wilson Chair of International Politics at Aberystwyth University. His book The Third British Empire was among the first to apply the expression "British Commonwealth" to the British Empire. He was a prominent liberal internationalist. He was also credited with coining the phrase "welfare state", which was made popular a few years later by William Temple.

== Early life and background ==
Zimmern was born on 26 January 1879 in Surbiton, Surrey, UK. He was raised in a cosmopolitan, upper-middle-class family. He was Huguenot on one side and German-Jewish on the other. His mother was Mathilde Eckhard. His father, Adolphus Hermann Christian Anton Zimmern, was a naturalised British citizen, born in Germany. Adolphus Zimmern was also the patriarch of a prominent Eurasian family in Hong Kong. Judge Archie Zimmern and former Hong Kong Stock Exchange chairman Francis Zimmern were both his nephews. The writers, translators and suffragettes Helen Zimmern and Alice Zimmern were his cousins.

Alfred was brought up a Christian and later an active participant in the World Council of Churches. Later in life he became a supporter of Zionism. He was educated at Winchester College, and read classics at New College, Oxford, where he won the Stanhope essay prize in 1902. At Berlin University, he came under the influence of Wilamowitz and Meyer.

== Academic career ==
Zimmern was educated at New College, Oxford; he obtained a First in Classical Moderations in 1900, followed by a First in Literae Humaniores ('Greats', a combination of philosophy and ancient history) in 1902. He was appointed Lecturer in Ancient History, New College, Oxford (1903), and Fellow and tutor, New College (1904–1909). He authored The Greek Commonwealth in 1911 where he characterized the rise of Athens as a positive for its neighbors and the Athenian Empire as an empire of freedom.

Later he was a staff inspector at the Board of Education (1912–1915) and a member of the Political Intelligence Department of the Foreign Office (1918–1919).

Zimmern founded the League of Nations Society in 1917. In 1918, he was appointed as head of a section in the British Foreign Office to think through the establishment of an international organization for peace. Zimmern drafted the blueprint of what would become the League of Nations: a regular conference system with a permanent secretariat and open to universal membership. Zimmern was skeptical of Wilsonian guarantees for national self-determination, warning against fixing state boundaries too rigidly and warning against making the League responsible for protecting minority rights. He argued for placing the supervision of Africa under an international commission. Zimmern opposed the creation of a democratic powerful World State, arguing that it was too mechanistic, impractical, and prone to tyranny. Zimmern also opposed a loose and informal concert system.

He became the inaugural Woodrow Wilson Chair of International Politics and the first Professor of International Politics (also known as International Relations) in the world, at Aberystwyth University (1919–1921). The endowment for the Woodrow Wilson Chair was announced in 1918 and Zimmern began work in the position in April 1919. After leaving Aberystwyth, he taught at Cornell University in 1922 and 1923.

In 1923, he and his wife Lucie Zimmern founded and ran the Geneva School of International Studies from 1923 to 1939. The Geneva School was held every summer at the Geneva Graduate Institute.

He was the inaugural Montague Burton Professor of International Relations, Oxford University (1930–1944).

== The Commonwealth, Chatham House and The Round Table ==
Zimmern was a proponent of a British Commonwealth, arguing that it could evolve and adapt to shifting circumstances and changing perspectives among its members.

He was a founder of the Royal Institute of International Affairs (Chatham House) (1920) and sat on its Council until the outbreak of the Second World War.

=== Chatham House's WWII Foreign Press and Research Service ===
When Chatham House, formed the Foreign Press and Research Service (FPRS) to provide intelligence for and to work closely with the Foreign Office during the Second World War, Zimmern stepped down from the Council of Chatham House in order to avoid a conflict of interest to serve on this with many other eminent historians under the direction of Arnold J. Toynbee and Lionel Curtis (represented the Chairman at Oxford). It was decentralised for security reasons, with many of the staff moving to Balliol College, Oxford from Chatham House's main buildings in St James's Square.

The formal remit of Chatham House for the FPRS at Balliol was:
1. To review the press overseas.
2. To “produce at the request of the Foreign Office, and the Service and other Departments, memoranda giving the historical and political background on any given situation on which information is desired”.
3. “To provide information on special points desired" (in regards to each country). It provided various reports on foreign press, historical and political background of the enemy and various other topics.

Zimmern, was one of four deputy directors. The three other Deputy Directors along with Zimmern were George N. Clark, Herbert J. Patton and Charles K. Webster.

It was moved to the Foreign Office 1943–46.

He was a member of the Round Table Group (1913–1923) and later was given as a source of information that had supposedly influenced the conspiracy theory views of the Round Table by Georgetown University professor Carroll Quigley.

== Internationalism ==
Zimmern is an influential proponent of liberal internationalism. By critics, Zimmern was described as a utopian and idealist thinker on international relations. He is cited often, in this perspective, in E. H. Carr's The Twenty Years' Crisis (1939); Carr and Zimmern are characterised as being "at opposite ends of the theoretical and political spectrum".

Zimmern contributed to the founding of the League of Nations Society and of UNESCO. He was Deputy Director of the League's Institute for Intellectual Co-operation, in Paris, in the mid-1920s; after tension with the Director, the French historian Julien Luchaire, both left. He was nominated in 1947 for the Nobel Peace Prize, in connection with his UNESCO work.

Zimmern joined the British Labour Party in 1924, and was Labour candidate for Carnarvon Boroughs against David Lloyd George in the general election of 1924. A close friend of Ramsay MacDonald, Zimmern followed him in 1931 when MacDonald formed the National Government. He became an active member of the National Labour Organisation and frequently wrote articles for its journal, the News-Letter. Zimmern was one of five writers who contributed to a book Towards a National Policy: Being a National Labour Contribution in April 1935.

Zimmern died in Avon, Connecticut, on 24 November 1957.

== Personal life ==
He was married to Lucie Zimmern, who was a musician and international relations thinker. Together, they founded and ran the Geneva School of International Studies from 1923 to 1939. The Geneva School was held every summer at the Geneva Graduate Institute.

== Works ==
- Henry Grattan, (1902)
- Nationality and Government with other war-time essays (1919)
- "Greek Political Thought", an essay in The Legacy of Greece (1921)
- Europe in Convalescence (1922)
- America and Europe (1929)
- Prospects of Democracy & Other Essays
- The Greek Commonwealth: Politics and Economics in Fifth Century Athens, 1911; 5th edition 1931, Oxford, reprint 1977
- The Economic Weapon Against Germany, London: Allen & Unwin, 1918
- The Third British Empire (1926; 3rd edition 1934), London: Oxford University Press
- The League of Nations and the Rule of Law 1918–1935 (1936)
- "The Ethical Presuppositions of a World Order", an essay in The Universal Church and the World of Nations (1938).
