= Red Lights (Milestones album) =

Studio album by Milestones
- Released: February 23, 2018
- Genres: Pop-punk, pop rock, pop
- Length: 39:48
- Label: Fearless
- Producer: Phil Gornell

Milestones chronology
Equal Measures (2015)	Red Lights (2018)

Professional ratings
Review scores
Source	Rating
Already Heard	2.5/5 stars
Alt Corner	Positive
Away From Life	4.5/5 stars
idobi Radio	4.5/5 stars
Louder than Words	2.5/5 stars
The Prelude Press	Positive
Rock Sound	4/5 stars
Sound Fiction	7.9/10
Sub Stream Magazine	2.5/5 stars
Tough Magazine	2.5/5 stars

Red Lights is the debut studio album by British band Milestones, released on February 23, 2018 on Fearless Records.

== Background ==
On January 26, 2018, the band released the lead single "Paranoid" and announced the album title and release date.

The band was inspired by Panic! at the Disco during the recording of the album.

== Track listing ==
All tracks written by Milestones.

1. Bittersweetheart (3:21)
2. Once Upon a Time (3:15)
3. Paranoid (3:11)
4. Against the World (4:02)
5. Eighteen (3:24)
6. Liar (3:09)
7. Hold On (4:23)
8. End Game (2:57)
9. This is My Life (4:25)
10. Counting Cars (3:47)
11. Forever or Never (3:54)

== Personnel ==
- Matt Clarke - lead vocals
- Drew Procter - lead guitar
- Mark Threlfall - bass guitar
- Eden Leviston - rhythm guitar
