= California Pacific Computer Company =

Computer software publisher

- Industry: Video games
- Founded: 1979; 47 years ago
- Founder: Alvin Earl Remmers
- Defunct: March 3, 1986
- Headquarters: Davis, California, United States

California Pacific Computer Co. was a computer software and game publisher active from 1979 to 1986, founded in Davis, California by Alvin Remmers. Its software was published exclusively for the Apple II computer and was an early commercial outlet for several important game designers including Richard Garriott, Bill Budge, and Michael Pondsmith.

== History ==
The company was founded by Alvin Earl Remmers (1942-2022), who had previously been in the tie-dye shirt business and used early microcomputers to track SKUs. While traveling to computer stores in California, he saw a copy of Super Invader (1979) for the Apple II. He discovered the game had not been widely distributed so he created California Pacific Computer to act as a collector and publisher for Apple II programs. Over 20,000 units of Super Invader sold; it was named the highest selling Apple II program by 1980.

Remmers soon devised the concept of promoting the names of the software authors with his products. After meeting Bill Budge while seeking copy protection for the floppy disk version of Super Invader, California Pacific published three of his games in a collection titled Bill Budge’s Trilogy of Games (1980) and later four in Bill Budge's Space Album (1980). After discovering Akalabeth: World of Doom (1980), Remmers collaborated with Softalk magazine to identify the author Richard Garriott under the pseudonym of Lord British – a name that Remmers said he originated.

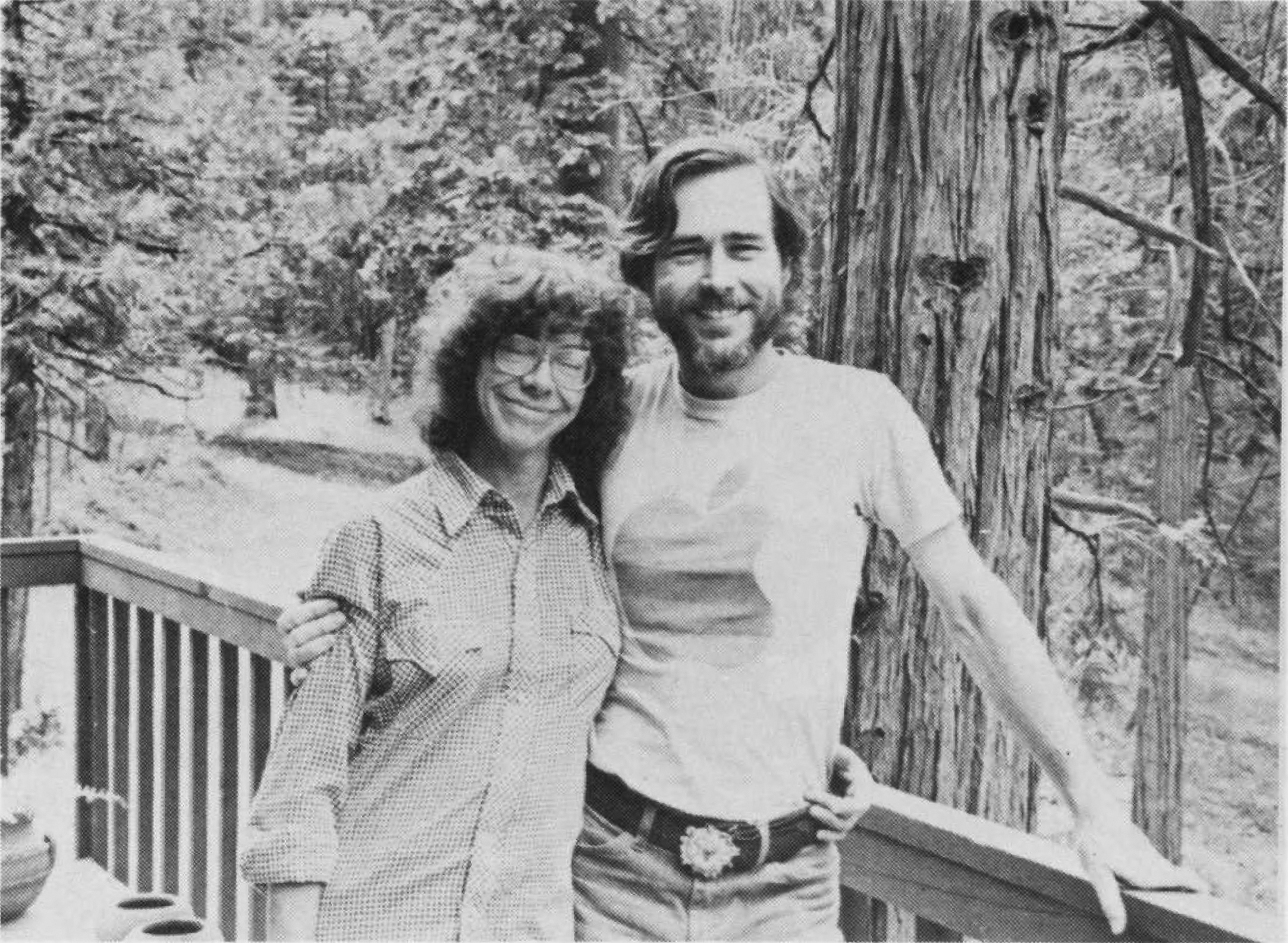
Al Remmers and his wife celebrated the first anniversary of On-Line Systems in 1981.

California Pacific served as a distributor for early microcomputer software. it also served as the agent for early game companies Sirius Software and Strategic Simulations Inc. and its short-lived Oakland office distributed the operating system CP/M. The publisher was known for its high quality packaging, though its games were distributed in sealed plastic bags rather than cardboard boxes. It used the label "Top of the Orchard Software" on many advertisements and disks. Much of the art on the packaging was provided by Michael Pondsmith – future creator of the Cyberpunk tabletop RPG – and Denis Loubet, who later worked with Origin Systems. Steve Gibson developed the copy protection for California Pacific's later products.

California Pacific kept the loyalty of collaborators through generous royalty payments to programmers. In 1981, it published Ultima (1981), the first in the long-running Ultima series. However, publicizing the authors without employing them proved to weaken the company's negotiating position. This compounded on the changing economics of computer distribution which made California Pacific’s product less profitable. Lastly, Remmers suffered addiction which led to tensions between him and the authors, leaving the company bereft by the end of 1981.

The company published several further games, the last few under the Progame label. Remmers sought addiction treatment and changed businesses. He became a documentary filmmaker, and died in 2022.

== Software published ==
- Super Invader (October 1979) Created by M. Hata. Later renamed Cosmos Mission.
- Bill Budge's Trilogy of Games (December 1979) Created by Bill Budge.
- Bill Budge's Space Album (March 1980) Created by Bill Budge.
- Head-On (July 1980) Clone of the arcade game Head On. Later renamed Fender Bender.
- Bill Budge's 3-D Graphics System (October 1980) Created by Bill Budge.
- Akalabeth: World of Doom (December 1980) Created by Richard Garriott.
- Apple-oids (April 1981) Created by Tom Luhrs. Clone of arcade game Asteroids. Also includes a Breakout clone called Chipout.
- Ultima (April 1981) Created by Richard Garriott and Ken Arnold.
- Hungry Boy (1982) Created by Nakan. Clone of arcade game Pac-Man.
- Brainteaser Boulevard (May 1983) Created by Chuck Bueche.
- Lady Tut (July 1983) Created by Greggy.
