= Milestone (Arlington, Massachusetts) =

- U.S. National Register of Historic Places
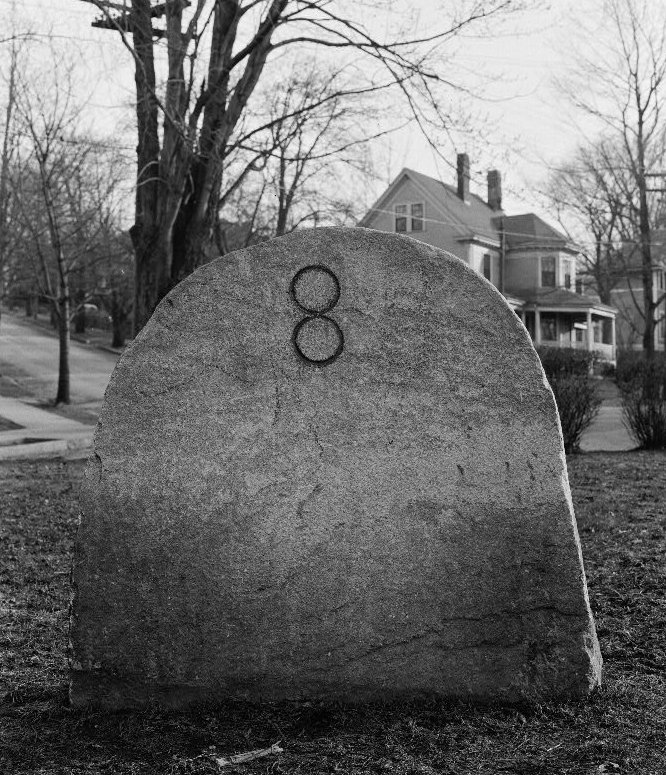
- Milestone 8

- Location within Massachusetts Location within the United States
- Location: Arlington, Massachusetts
- Coordinates: 42°25′22.1″N 71°10′52.8″W
- Built: 1790
- MPS: Arlington MRA
- NRHP reference No.: 85002683
- Added to NRHP: September 27, 1985

This Milestone, carved in 1790, is a historic milestone at the intersection of Appleton Street and Paul Revere Road in Arlington, Massachusetts. It denotes the point at which the historic road from Boston to Concord, Massachusetts was 8 miles (13 km) from Boston. The road was realigned (to roughly the current alignment of Massachusetts Avenue) in 1811, bypassing the marker. It was moved slightly during road works in 1940, and now sits in a triangular island in the intersection.

The marker was listed on the National Register of Historic Places in 1985.

== See also ==
- 1767 Milestones
- Haverhill Street Milestone in Reading, Massachusetts
- National Register of Historic Places listings in Arlington, Massachusetts
