= Space Games-3 =

1980 video game

- Publisher: Creative Computing
- Platform: TRS-80
- Release: 1980

Space Games-3 is a 1980 video game by Creative Computing for the TRS-80 Model I Level II.

== Gameplay ==
Space Games-3 is a compilation of four space-themed games for the TRS-80 Model I Level II. The package contains Ultra Trek, Romulan, Star Wars and Star Lanes.

Ultra Trek is a real-time variation of the Star Trek computer game in which players command the Enterprise against Klingon warships and stationary battle stations. The game features an 8 × 8 grid of galactic quadrants, each subdivided into 64 sectors. Players can use warp and impulse engines, as well as a hyperspace jump that transports the ship to a random location. Unlike traditional turn-based Star Trek games, the game's clock advances continuously. The Enterprise is equipped with torpedoes and an experimental weapon that produces unpredictable effects.

Romulan challenges players to locate and destroy an invisible enemy spacecraft using an anti-cloaking device. Star Wars places players in control of an X-wing fighter, using keyboard-controlled gunsights to shoot down TIE fighters. Star Lanes, the only multiplayer game in the compilation, is an economic strategy game in which players establish space transportation companies, trade shares, merge businesses and compete to accumulate the greatest wealth.

== Reception ==
J. Mishcon reviewed Space Games-3 in The Space Gamer No. 30. Mishcon commented that "The under ten set will enjoy these games, but don't be surprised if they soon tire and move on."

The game was reviewed in The Dragon #43 by Mark Herro. Herro commented that "Even though I may not particularly like all of the games in the package, I think Space Games-3 is well worth its modest price tag. If you're into space games, and you have a TRS-80, at least take a look at this package."

Herro particularly praised Ultra Trek for its fast-paced gameplay and considered it sufficient justification for purchasing the compilation. However, he criticised Romulan for relying more on chance than skill, while describing Star Wars as a reasonably entertaining shooting game despite its relatively slow speed. He also highlighted the economic strategy elements of Star Lanes, which could be played by multiple participants.
