= David R. Leeper =

American politician (1832–1900)

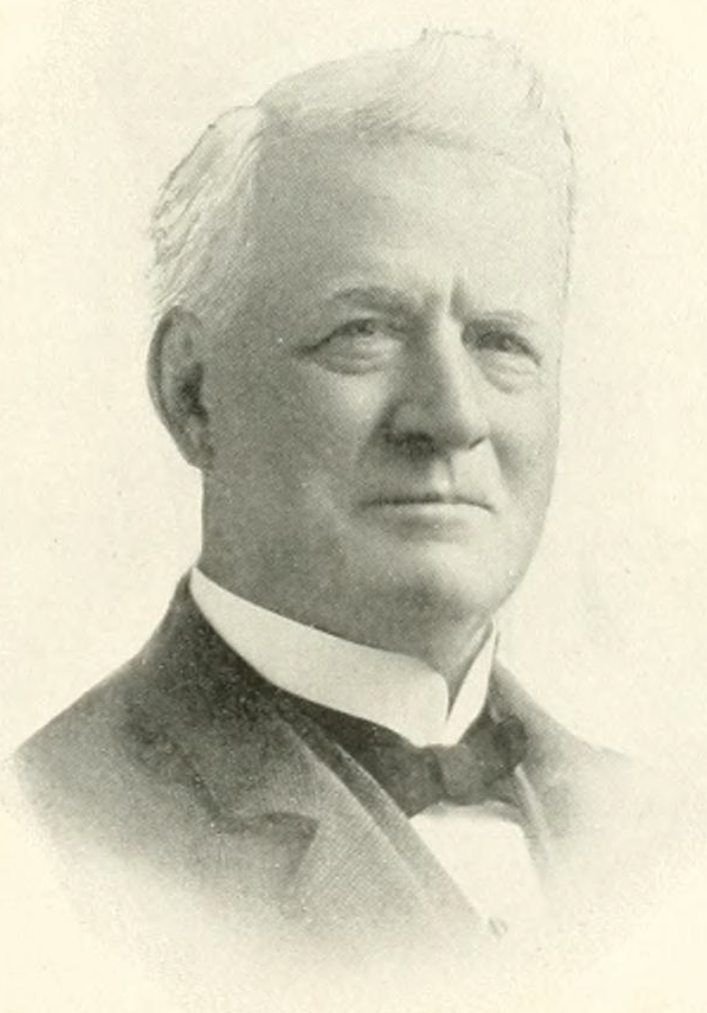
- Leeper in 1901 publication

Mayor of South Bend
- In office 1892–1894
- Preceded by: William H. Longley
- Succeeded by: D. B. J. Schaffer

Member of the Indiana Senate
- In office 1878

Member of the Indiana House of Representatives
- In office 1874–1877

Personal details
- Born: David Rohrer Leeper; January 12, 1832 near South Bend, Indiana, U.S.
- Died: November 27, 1900 (aged 68) South Bend, Indiana, U.S.
- Resting place: Rohrer Cemetery; St. Joseph County, Indiana, U.S.
- Party: Whig; Republican (before 1872); Democratic (1874 and after)
- Occupation: Politician; writer; miner

David Rohrer Leeper (January 12, 1832 – November 27, 1900) was a politician, writer and miner from Indiana. He served in the Indiana House of Representatives from 1874 to 1877 and Indiana Senate in 1878. He served as Mayor of South Bend from 1892 to 1894 and police commissioner of South Bend.

== Early life ==
David Rohrer Leeper was born on January 12, 1832, in a log cabin near South Bend, Indiana, to Elizabeth (née Rohrer) and Samuel Leeper. At a young age, his parents moved to a tract of land near the Sumption Prairie Road in South Bend. He grew up on the farm and attended public schools. He also studied under professors Wright and Cogswell in South Bend. He attended school at the old seminary building (the site later became the South Bend High School).

On February 22, 1849, Leeper and his friends journeyed to the Pacific coast. They reached the gold fields on October 11, 1849. Leeper then moved to the Sacramento, California, and built coffins. Leeper moved to Coloma, California, and then to Hangtown, California. He stayed at Hangtown for a few months. He then went north to Trinity County and mined in Weaverville until the next fall. He was wounded in the leg by an arrow from Digger Indians. Leeper then moved to Humboldt Bay and engaged in logging. He remained there until May 1854. He then returned to Indiana and attended school at Mishawaka Institute.

== Career ==
In 1864, Leeper moved west to Montana and worked in mining and freight. He was a Whig until the Republican Party formed. In 1867, Leeper was nominated to the Montana House of Representatives but was defeated. He returned to Indiana in August 1868. In 1872, he left the Republican Party. He was nominated for the Indiana House of Representatives by the Liberal Party and the Democratic Party, but declined. He was elected to that body in 1874 as an independent and re-elected in 1877. In 1878, Leeper was elected to the Indiana Senate as a Democrat, representing St. Joseph and Starke counties. While in office, he advocated for game laws, a new state house and better care for the poor and insane. In 1882, Leeper was nominated for County Auditor for St. Joseph County but was defeated.

In 1892, Leeper was elected as Mayor of South Bend. In 1894, he was defeated for re-election by D. B. J. Schaffer. In January 1895 he was appointed as police commissioner of the South Bend police board by Governor Claude Matthews. He served until March 30, 1897. He was re-appointed by Governor James A. Mount in January 1899. He served until his death.

Leeper wrote about local history and wrote "The American Idea" and "The Argonauts of '49". Leeper served as vice president of South Bend National Bank until his death.

== Personal life ==
Leeper did not marry. He died on November 27, 1900, at his home at North Michigan Street in South Bend. He was buried at Rohrer Cemetery in St. Joseph County.
