= Jack Leiper =

English cricketer

John Morton Leiper (17 February 1921 — 17 July 2006) was an English cricketer. He was a left-handed batsman and a right-arm fast-medium bowler and wicket-keeper who played for Essex. He was born in Woodford Green and attended Chigwell School.

Having originally played for Essex's Second XI during the 1948 Minor Counties Championship, it was two years before Leiper made his first-class debut, against Gloucestershire in the 1950 County Championship. Leiper had a difficult debut, scoring 6 and 0 runs during the game. He made his second and final first-class appearance less than a week later, against Somerset, in which, despite making a duck in the first innings, he scored a brilliant innings of 44 before being caught out by Maurice Tremlett, grandfather of current England Test cricketer Chris.

Leiper remained in the Essex tailend for the entirety of his short first-class career. His son, Robert Leiper, also played two first-class matches for Essex, in the 1981 and 1982 seasons.
