= Milestones (video game) =

1981 video game

- Developer: Creative Computing
- Publisher: Creative Computing
- Platform: Apple II
- Release: 1981

Milestones is a 1981 video game published by Creative Computing for the Apple II.

== Description ==
Milestones is a computer game about auto racing similar to Touring. The players receive cards that contain events occurring during a car race. Some of these move the player forward towards the 1000 mile point, and the general goal is to play enough of these to cross the line first. Other cards are hazards that can be played against the opponent, or solutions to those hazards. For instance, a hazard might be a flat tire card, while the remedy is a spare tire card. Normally played by two or more players, in Milestones the computer can play the other hands.

== Reception ==
Forrest Johnson reviewed Milestones in The Space Gamer No. 40. Johnson commented that "Milestones is not for the average wargamer - strategy can be optimized much too easily. Still, it is a good game for people who enjoy solitaire."
