= Mary Ann Leeper =

Mary Ann Leeper is the founder of the Female Health Foundation (1994) where she became the chair and board member. She was president and COO for ten plus years before retiring in 2013. Leeper also co-founded another organization called the Business Woman's Initiative against HIV/AIDS. With Leeper's aid, the newest version of the female condom will be introduced to women in locations with high rates of HIV/AIDS. The launch of this new female condom is cheaper and will reach more women. Leeper gives lectures and presentations in colleges and universities across the world. Her main goal is to “help millions of women protect themselves against the spread of HIV and AIDS”. She also stated, “It is not a simple goal, but it is one I am determined to do everything possible to achieve.”

== Education ==
Mary Ann Leeper earned her Bachelor of Science at Drexel University. She received a Master of Science at Temple University. Leeper later received her master's degree in business at Northwestern University's Kellogg Graduate School of Management. She returned to Temple University to study for her doctorate in pharmaceutical chemistry.

== Career ==
Before retirement, Leeper gave lectures to colleges and universities regarding global entrepreneurship, gender bias, corporate social responsibility, women's issues in the developing world, and prevention programs against HIV/AIDS. She was also an assistant professor at Temple University Schools of Pharmacy and Medicine along with being a biochemist and director of Neenah Paper Company. Her main focus and overall works revolve around global entrepreneurship, gender bias, women's issue in the world, and lastly female sexual health and protection.

=== Female condom ===
Her most recent contribution was the launch of the female condom. She switched from polyurethane material to synthetic latex, which overall saves manufacturing costs and makes the condom much more affordable. The female condom is an over the counter contraceptive, which has been FDA approved for over 20 years. The female condom gives females an option in choosing the best contraceptive, while remaining sexually active. The female condom contains just as high of a success rate as the male condom. It has between 93% and 95% pregnancy prevention success, which is lower than oral contraceptives, injectables, or the IUD.

== Awards ==
United Nation have given her various recognition awards for her work on women's sexual and reproductive health.
Women's Entrepreneurship from Temple University's School of Business (November 2003) As a senior strategic advisor, Leeper has received several prestigious awards, starting from the University of Temple and a recognition award in 2005 and certain United Nations and global health agencies. Along with Mary Ann Leepers’ amazing accomplishments, she also plays a big role in theFemale Health Company’s. She gathers with the MAC, CDC, Department of Health, Female Health Company, and CVS to discuss her personal goal to make female condoms a strong accessible to all women in the country.

== Boards/Committees ==
- INFLUX (pharmaceutical company)
- Board of Visitors (Temple University of Pharmacy)
- Board of Advisors (School of Nursing at the University of Virginia)
- Northwestern University School of Music Visiting Committee
- Board for the Center for Development ad Population Activities (CEDPA)
