= Leeper Lake =

- Location within Oklahoma
- Country: United States
- Location: Love County, Oklahoma
- Coordinates: 33.735967°N 97.122252°W
- Status: complete

Leeper Lake is a reservoir in Love County, Oklahoma. The lake is located south of Thackerville, close to the Red River and the Texas border. It is owned by a private Texas corporation, Leeper Lake Inc.

== Recreation ==
The lake is a popular fishing location, due to its location near the WinStar World Casino.
