= Learning with Leeper =

1983 educational video game

- Developer: Sierra On-Line
- Publisher: Sierra On-Line
- Platforms: Apple II, ColecoVision, Commodore 64, Atari 8-bit, ZX Spectrum, Tandy 1000
- Release: 1983
- Genre: Educational
- Mode: Single-player

Learning with Leeper is a 1983 educational video game developed and published by Sierra On-Line. Similar to Learning with FuzzyWOMP (1984), it teaches colours, numbers, and the alphabet to players. It reuses the character from the Sierra On-Line game Lunar Leepers

== Development ==
"A Brighter Future For Early Learning Through High Tech" asserted that, in 1984, several commercial software developers had decided that "there is a market for children as young as three" in the gaming space. Learning With Leeper is one such game that attempted to appeal to this segment.

== Gameplay ==
The game is played with a joystick. Players navigate the Leeper icon across the menu screen to choose a minigame. The four available choices are symbolized by a dog (counting), balloon (shape matching), frog (hand-eye coordination), and overturned paint can (creativity). The game does not record performance scores.

== Reception ==
Learning with Leeper was well received, gaining the award for "1984 Best Educational Video Game/Computer Game" at the 5th annual Arkie Awards where judges described it as "a painless way for youngsters to learn such tricky concepts as counting and shape recognition". It was predicted that children who had not yet learned to read would still have "a fine time" with the game and that the game's "Painting" segment would "be a spur to youthful creativity". Personal Computing wrote that children should enjoy the title, while Betsy Staples of Gifted Children Newsletter explained "all in all, we think [it] is an excellent package" due to being aesthetically pleasing, attention-holding, and educational.

In regard to creating a softkey for the game, Hardcore Computist writer Marco Hunter wrote: "The three things you can count on in this life are death, taxes, and Sierra On-line nibble counts. With this in mind, I tackled Learning with Leeper, a recent educational release from Sierra. I quickly discovered that, as usual, the disk is normal DOS 3.3. This means it is easily copied with COPYA."

Math and Science for Young Children argues the game can be utilised by children for one-to-one kinesthetic and perceptual-motor experiences. Ready: A Commodore 64 Retrospective gave the game a rarity score of 3, and a Historical Importance score of L. Reaching Students Through Computers: A New Therapy for Learning and Playing deemed it a "very simple program".
