= Milestones (magazine) =

Bible magazine

Milestones (or Milestones to the Kingdom) is an annual published by the Christadelphian Scripture Study Service. Its focus is Bible prophecy, and its intention (according to the magazine's website) is to review the 'events of the past year in the light of Bible prophecy'. The 2007 edition (Milestones to the Kingdom 2006: A Review of the World Events of 2006 in the Light of Bible Prophecy) is the 30th issue. Milestones Updates also appear quarterly in another Christadelphian publication, The Bible Magazine, and Milestones Snippets (an email list covering current affairs articles 'of interest to students of Bible prophecy') is available approximately twice a week.

The main author is a Christadelphian from the UK, Donald Pearce from Rugby, Warwickshire. Until 1992 Donald's father, Graham, wrote it and in 1993 & 1994 father and son wrote it together. Subscriptions and limited back issues are available to order from the Milestones and CSSS websites.

An annual "Prophecy Day" is organised in the UK in conjunction with Milestones.
