= Llamhigyn y Dŵr =

Creature from Welsh folklore

Llamhigyn y Dŵr (Welsh for 'Water Leaper') is an evil creature from Welsh folklore that lived in swamps and ponds.

It is described as a giant frog with a bat's wings and zero legs whatsoever, and a long, lizard-like tail with a stinger at the end. It jumps across the water using its wings, hence its name.

It was blamed for problems ranging from snapping fishing lines to eating livestock or even fishermen.
