= Milestones (British band) =

British pop rock band

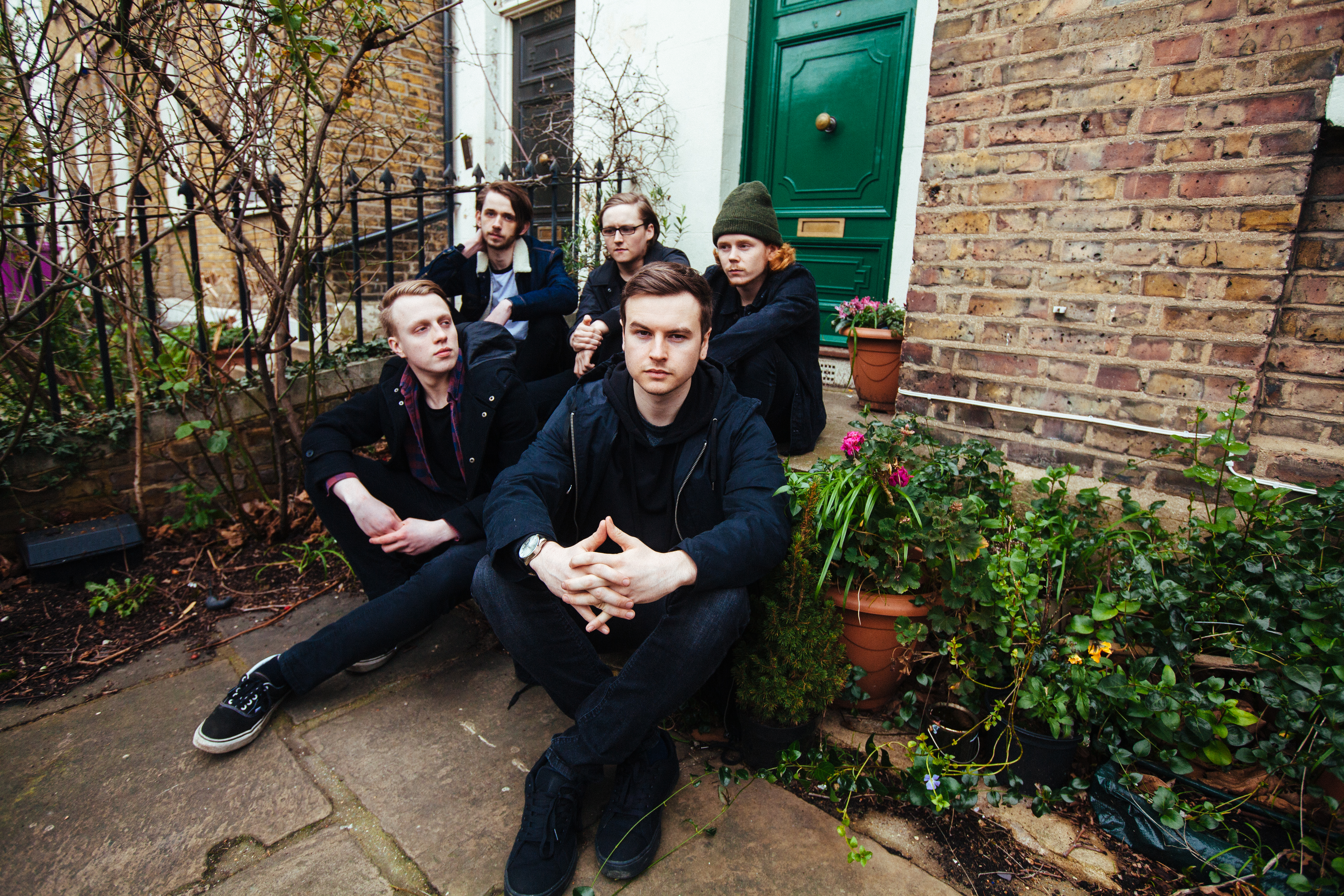
- Milestones in 2016

Background information
- Origin: Manchester, England, UK
- Genres: Pop rock, alternative rock
- Years active: 2014–2019
- Label: Fearless
- Past members: Matt Clarke; Andrew Procter; Mark Threlfall; Eden Leviston
- Website: milestonesband.co.uk

Milestones were a British pop rock band from Manchester, England, formed in 2014. The band consisted of vocalist Matt Clarke, guitarist and vocalist Andrew Procter, bassist Mark Threlfall, and guitarist Eden Leviston.

== History ==
They released their debut EP, Equal Measures, independently on 6 April 2015. The band signed to Fearless Records in June 2016 and re-released their EP Equal Measures on 8 July 2016. Frontman Matt Clarke was only 17 years old when the band signed to Fearless Records in June 2016.

On 26 January 2018, the band released the lead single, "Paranoid" from their upcoming debut album titled Red Lights. The album was released on 23 February 2018.

On 29 October 2018, Milestones announced their separation via their official Twitter page, citing pursuit of new dreams and taking a break as their reasons for the breakup. Their final farewell shows took place on 18 and 19 January 2019.

== Touring ==
After signing to Fearless Records, Milestones toured with Hawthorne Heights, WSTR, With Confidence, Mayday Parade, Simple Plan and more.

Lineup	Location	Date(s)
Fort Hope, Milestones	United Kingdom	May 2017
Waterparks, Milestones	Camden Barfly, London, England	31 May 2016
Area 11, Milestones	United Kingdom	4 July 2016 – 1 August 2016
Hawthorne Heights, Milestones	United Kingdom	9 August 2016 – 18 August 2016
WSTR, Milestones	United Kingdom	24 October 2016 – 5 November 2016
Taking Back Sunday, Frank Iero And The Patience, Milestones	O2 Ritz, Manchester, England	15 February 2017
With Confidence, Broadside, Safe To Say, Milestones	United Kingdom, Europe	24 February 2017 – 18 March 2017
Mayday Parade, Knuckle Puck, Milestones	United States	23 March 2017 – 26 May 2017
Simple Plan, Mallory Knox, Milestones, Trash Boat, Four Year Strong, The Bottom Line	United Kingdom, Europe	28 May 2017 – 17 June 2017

== Discography ==
- Equal Measures EP - Fearless Records - 8 July 2016
- Red Lights - Fearless Records - 28 February 2018

== Band members ==
- Matt Clarke - lead vocals (2014-2019)
- Drew Procter - lead guitar (2014-2019)
- Mark Threlfall - bass guitar (2014-2019)
- Eden Leviston - rhythm guitar (2014-2019)
