= Haverhill Street Milestone =

- U.S. National Register of Historic Places
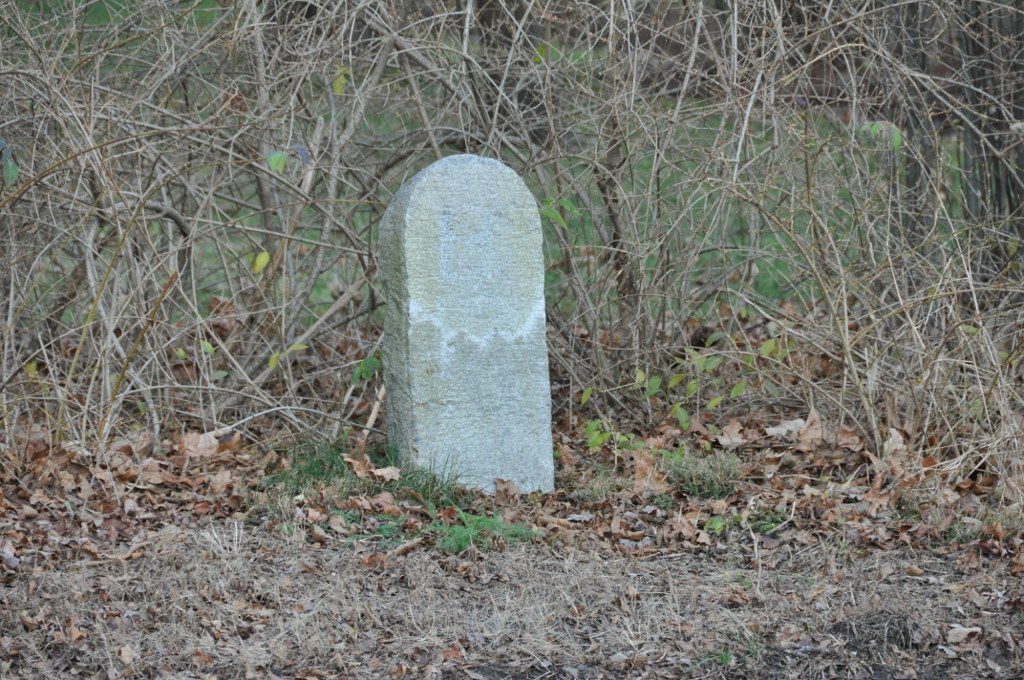

- Location within Massachusetts Location within the United States
- Location: Reading, Massachusetts
- Coordinates: 42°32′17.59″N 71°5′14.44″W
- Built: 1800
- MPS: Reading MRA
- NRHP reference No.: 85000499
- Added to NRHP: February 1, 1985

The Haverhill Street Milestone is a historic milestone on Haverhill Street in Reading, Massachusetts. Located on the east side of the road just south of its junction with Wakefield Street, it is a granite slab with a rounded top that is about 2.5 feet (0.76 m) in height (including the buried portion). It is marked "B / 12 / M", denoting the distance along what was historically the post road between Boston and Haverhill. Similar markers are found in neighboring Wakefield.

The marker was added to the National Register of Historic Places in 1985.

== See also ==
- 1767 Milestones
- National Register of Historic Places listings in Reading, Massachusetts
- National Register of Historic Places listings in Middlesex County, Massachusetts
