= Valentine Leeper =

Australian classicist, teacher, polemicist and letter-writer

Valentine Alexa Leeper (14 February 1900 – 26 July 2001) was an Australian classicist, teacher, polemicist, and letter-writer of renown.

== Life ==
Valentine Leeper was born on Valentine's Day 1900 in the Leeper Building of Trinity College at the University of Melbourne, daughter of Alexander Leeper, first warden of that college, and his second wife, Mary (née Moule). Her half-brothers, Reginald Leeper and Allen Leeper, both became prominent British diplomats. Her brother, Geoffrey Leeper, became the first professor of agricultural chemistry at the University of Melbourne.

Leeper was educated at Melbourne Church of England Girls Grammar School and at Trinity College. For many years she worked as secretary and carer to her father, and then as carer for her mother. After both had died, in her middle age, she obtained work as a school teacher.

== Views ==
Eccentric and conservative in style, but liberal in many of her views, Leeper acquired from her father the spirit of a controversialist, and over many decades she was a frequent writer of letters to newspapers, government ministers, Anglican church leaders and many others. She was a commentator and activist on international affairs (e.g. as a long-time member of the League of Nations Union), Indigenous affairs (including as a long-time member of the Victorian Aboriginal Group), education (including the protection of classical studies), the church (for example, as an advocate of women's ordination). Her other interests included hockey playing.

In 1944, she published a pamphlet, Piecrust Promises, attacking what she saw as the British betrayal of Poland to the Soviet Union during World War II, which had originally been fought to protect Poland. For many years in the mid-20th century, Leeper appeared on Australian radio as a provider of little-known information and her own clear opinions. A strong defender of her father's memory and opinions, she provided much information for a biography of him, written by John Poynter, and published in 1997.

In 1998, Leeper was installed as a fellow of Trinity College (University of Melbourne). She died in 2001 and her ashes were interred in a garden next to the building in which she was born and in which she had played as a girl.

Nobody's Valentine: Letters in the Life of Valentine Alexa Leeper, 1900-2001 was published in 2008. It was launched by Geoffrey Blainey and has been described by women's historian Patricia Grimshaw as "a vivid and compelling portrait of this influential woman", and as being at "the forefront of insightful biography".

== Sources ==
- Marion Poynter, Nobody's Valentine: Letters in the Life of Valentine Alexa Leeper, 1900-2001, Miegunyah Press, Melbourne, 2008.
- Patricia Grimshaw, "A woman of passionate engagement", TrinityToday, Trinity College (University of Melbourne), December 2008.
- Donald Markwell, "Valentine Leeper", in 'A large and liberal education': higher education for the 21st century, Australian Scholarly Publishing & Trinity College, University of Melbourne, 2007.
- Donald Markwell, "Nobody's Valentine: A Personal Reflection", TrinityToday, Trinity College (University of Melbourne), September 2008.
- John Poynter, Doubts and Certainties: A life of Alexander Leeper, Melbourne University Press, 1997.
