= Robert Leiper =

English cricketer

Robert Leiper (born 30 August 1961) was an English cricketer. He was a left-handed batsman and a right-arm medium-pace bowler who played for Essex. He was born in Woodford Green.

Leiper made three Youth Test appearances for England Young Cricketers in 1980, scoring an average of 17 from six innings. The following year, he was signed by Essex, and made his first of two first-class appearances during the 1981 season, against a team of touring Australians. Despite making just one run in his first innings, he scored 49 in his second, backed up by Alan Lilley. His second and final first-class appearance came during the 1982 County Championship, in a game against Surrey. Leiper made just three runs in this game, being caught out by Alan Butcher in the second innings for a duck.

Leiper was an upper-order batsman during his short – and contrasting – first-class career. Leiper's father, Jack, made two first-class appearances during 1950 – and in fact had very similar career statistics to his son.
