= Political Intelligence Department (1918–1920) =

The Political Intelligence Department (1918–1920) was a department of the British Foreign Office created towards the end of World War I. It was created on 11 March 1918 by Permanent Under-Secretary Lord Hardinge. It gathered political, economic, and military conditions in both allied and enemy countries and prepared reports for the cabinet, the Foreign Office, and other departments. The director of the department was William Tyrrell, with James Headlam-Morley serving as assistant director. Most of the staff were drawn from the Department of Information's Intelligence Bureau, including historians Arnold Toynbee, Lewis Namier, and Alfred Zimmern.

A major function of the department was to prepare reports on all subjects and countries which might be of importance at the anticipated peace conference following the war.

A similar department was created in 1939 at the outbreak of World War II, also called the Political Intelligence Department.

== See also ==
- Political Intelligence Department (1939–1943)
