= Lunar Leeper =

1982 video game

- Developer: Syndein Systems
- Publisher: Sierra On-Line
- Programmer: Chuck Bueche
- Platforms: Apple II, Atari 8-bit, Commodore 64, VIC-20
- Release: 1982: Apple II, VIC; 1983: Atari 8-bit, C64
- Genre: Scrolling shooter
- Mode: Single-player

Lunar Leeper, also released as Lunar Leepers, is a horizontally scrolling shooter written by Chuck Bueche for the Apple II. It was published under Sierra On-Line's SierraVision label in 1982, then ported to the VIC-20, Atari 8-bit computers, and Commodore 64. The Apple II version is copy-protected using Sierra's Spiradisc system.

The Lunar Leeper character later starred in the 1983 educational game Learning with Leeper.

== Gameplay ==
The game takes place on the planet Opthamalia, in the Valley of the Leepers, which the manual describes as omnivorous creatures having "two long rubbery legs, a single eye and a massive green beak". In the first phase of the game, the player pilots a spaceship to rescue crew members stranded in the valley among the Leepers. The Leepers must be avoided or shot, lest they leap up and consume the spaceship or the crew member it carries. Once all the crew members are either rescued or killed, the second phase begins. In this phase the player navigates the ship through a cave in search of a giant eyeball which must be destroyed. The cave is trapped with automatic lasers and guarded by creatures known as "trabants."

== Reception ==
Lunar Leeper was favourably reviewed in the inaugural issue of Personal Computer Games. Softline in 1983 called the game "very addictive, and you'll probably lose hours of sleep over it". Ahoy! in 1984 stated that the VIC-20 version was "original, 'cute', and hard as hell", and that the Commodore 64 version had a great "personality", but "with no graphic or gameplay breakthroughs and a lack of variation of long-range playability ... there is less here than meets the eye".
