= Akalabeth: World of Doom =

1979 video game

- Cover art by Denis Loubet
- Developer: Richard Garriott
- Publisher: California Pacific Computer Company
- Platforms: Apple II, MS-DOS
- Release: 1980: Apple II; 1980: Apple / California Pacific re-release February 17th, 1998: MS-DOS
- Genre: Role-playing
- Mode: Single-player

Akalabeth: World of Doom (/əˈkæləbɛθ/) is a role-playing video game created in 1979 for the Apple II by Richard Garriott, and published by California Pacific Computer Company in 1980. Garriott designed the game as a hobbyist project, which is now recognized as one of the earliest known examples of a role-playing video game and as a predecessor of the Ultima series of games that started Garriott's career. Garriott is the sole author of the game, with the exception of title artwork by Keith Zabalaoui.

== Gameplay ==
The main overhead view of Akalabeth. The player is represented by a cross. There is a town to the northwest and impassable mountains to the southeast. (The colors are from the DOS port of the game for the Ultima Collection.)

The game attempts to bring the gameplay of pen-and-paper role-playing games to the computer platform. The player receives quests from Lord British (Garriott's alter-ego and nickname since high school) to kill a succession of ten increasingly difficult monsters.

The majority of gameplay takes place in an underground dungeon, but there was also a simple above-ground world map and text descriptions to fill out the rest of the adventure. The player could visit the Adventure Shop to purchase food, weapons, a shield and a magic amulet; the player's statistics can also be viewed here.

The game used concepts that would later become standard in the Ultima series, including:

- First-person gameplay in dungeons
- Requiring food to survive
- A top-down overhead world view
- Hotkeys used for commands
- The use of Elizabethan English

The first-person dungeon perspective of Akalabeth. The player is fighting a skeleton near a ladder. The dark blue color indicates this is the second level of the dungeon. (The colors are from the DOS port of the game for the Ultima Collection.)

== Development ==
The game was made by teenager Richard Garriott in Applesoft BASIC for the Apple II while he was attending high school in the Houston, Texas suburbs. Begun first as a school project during his junior year using the school's mainframe system DEC PDP-11, the game continually evolved over two years under the working title DND with the help of his friends and regular Dungeons & Dragons partners who acted as play-testers. Final development of the game began soon after his initial encounter with Apple computers in the summer of 1979, on an Apple II bought for him by his father and, later, on an Apple II Plus, but Garriott did not expect that the public would see his work.

Early versions of the game used an overhead view with ASCII characters representing items and monsters. However, after playing Escape, an early maze game for the Apple II, he instead decided to switch to a wire-frame, first-person view for the underground dungeon portions of the game, making it the first computer role-playing game with such graphics. The game asks the player to provide a "lucky number", which it uses as a random seed to procedurally generate the rest of the game, including dungeons and player stats; by using the same number the player can always return to a given world. The Ultima Collection version added savegame support while still using a similar random seed.

When the game reached version DND28B later that year (where "28B" refers to the revision), he demoed the game – now renamed to Akalabeth – for his boss, John Prosper Mayer, at a Webster-area ComputerLand, who suggested he sell the game in the store. Garriott consented and spent $200 to package and sell the game for $20 inside Ziploc bags, with photocopied instructions and a cover drawn by his mother. It warned "BEWARE FOOLISH MORTAL, YOU TRESPASS IN AKALABETH, WORLD OF DOOM!!", and claimed to offer "10 different Hi-Res Monsters combined with perfect perspective and infinite dungeon levels". California Pacific Computer Company received a copy, and contacted Garriott to publish the game. Garriott flew to California with his parents and agreed to receive $5 for each copy sold. The retail price of the California Pacific version, with cover artwork by Denis Loubet, was $35; Garriott claims that the game sold 30,000 copies, with him receiving $150,000, and that Akalabeth had the best return on investment, with later games "all downhill from there". The company suggested that for marketing purposes "Lord British" be credited as the author, and organized a contest for Softalk readers to figure out his true identity.

In creating Akalabeth, Garriott was primarily inspired by Dungeons & Dragons, for which he held weekly sessions in his parents' house while in high school, and the works of J. R. R. Tolkien, which he received from an in-law of his brother. The name derives from Tolkien's Akallabêth, part of The Silmarillion, though the game is not based on Tolkien's story. In the original game, the last monster on the need-to-kill list is called "Balrog", like the demonic monster from The Lord of the Rings, and unlike the later name for the monster in the Ultima games, Balron.

While not explicitly stated, Akalabeth is often considered the first game of the Ultima series, a very popular and influential series of early role-playing video games.

== Release ==
Most sources, including Garriott and Origin Systems, say that Akalabeth was created in the summer of 1979 after he graduated from high school, and sold that year in Ziploc bags. Maher believes that Garriott did not begin selling Akalabeth until the summer of 1980, after his first year of college. California Pacific widely released the game in 1980 with a 1980 copyright date, and Akalabeth first appeared on the Softalk top 30 list for the month of October 1980.

Akalabeth was written in Applesoft BASIC, allowing users to modify the source code. For example, the game's magic amulet, which occasionally did unpredictable things like turn a player into a high-powered Lizard Man, or a weak Toad, could be set for "Lizard Man" with every use, progressively increasing the player's strength to the point of virtual indestructibility. One could also set the player's statistics (normally randomly generated and fairly weak to start) to any level desired. Also later Origin Systems offered the source code on their FTP servers.

Akalabeth is included in the 1998 Ultima Collection where it officially picked up the nickname Ultima 0. The version, programmed for free by Corey Roth, an Ultima fan, in the Collection added CGA colors and MIDI. It runs on MS-DOS compatible operating systems, making it the first official port of the game to any system other than the Apple II.

== Reception ==
According to Richard Garriott, Akalabeth sold roughly 30,000 units. As he earned $5 per copy, these sales totaled $150,000 in revenue, which Garriott called "not a bad return for a hundred hours of work by a high school kid".

Steve Jackson reviewed Akalabeth in The Space Gamer No. 36. Jackson commented that "On the whole, I recommend Akalabeth highly. The graphics are better than I've seen on any similar game; the program is varied and fairly logical. And it's fun".

The game was reviewed in 1982 in The Dragon #65 by Bruce Humphrey. Humphrey concluded that "Akalabeth is a poor cousin in relation to Wizardry and some of the other recent role-playing computer games". Scorpia of Computer Gaming World, a fan of Ultima, agreed in 1991 and 1993: "Bluntly, it wasn't all that terrific." She did, however, note that the game was the first to offer 3-D perspective dungeon graphics.

Copies of the original Akalabeth are much rarer than those of other games that sold fewer than 30,000 copies. Jimmy Maher from the Digital Antiquarian homepage believes that Garriott is mistaken on the figure, as the game only appeared near the bottom of the Softalk's monthly list of the top 30 best-selling Apple II programs twice before being discontinued in 1982; by contrast Sierra On-Line's The Wizard and the Princess, which often appeared near the top of the list, sold 25,000 copies by mid-1982. Given California Pacific's high royalty rates, he suggests that 10,000 copies might have been enough for Garriott to earn $150,000.
