= Alexander Leeper =

Australian cleric and educator (1848–1934)

Alexander Leeper (3 June 1848 – 6 August 1934), was an Australian educator.

Valentine Leeper, Leeper's eldest child by his second marriage, became a classicist, teacher, polemicist (like her father), and letter-writer of renown.
