= Chuck Bueche =

Video game programmer

Chuck Bueche (also known as Chuckles) is a video game programmer best known for co-founding Origin Systems and his involvement with the Ultima video game series.

Bueche was a high school friend and university roommate of Richard Garriott in Austin, Texas. After being introduced to computers by Garriott in 1981, Bueche founded his own company, Craniac Entertainment. Shortly thereafter, three of Bueche's games, Lunar Leepers, Jawbreaker II, and Laf Pak, were published by Sierra On-Line.

In 1983, Bueche, along with Richard Garriott, Robert Garriott, and Owen Garriott, founded the software company Origin Systems. Origin became the publisher of Richard's Ultima series; Bueche ported many of the original Apple II games to the Commodore 64 and Atari 8-bit computers. He designed and programmed other Origin games, including Autoduel and 2400 A.D.

The last original game Chuck developed at Origin was 2500 A.D., but was halted in production in 1988 due to poor sales of 2400 A.D.

Bueche left Origin in 1988 to obtain a bachelor's degree in electrical engineering from the University of Texas at Austin (1990). He later held executive positions at Velocity Incorporated, Xatrix Entertainment, and Dell Computer.

In the Ultima series, Bueche is represented by Lord British's court jester, also named Chuckles. In later games in the series, Chuckles taunts the main character, the Avatar, with silly riddles and games.
