= Ultima I: The First Age of Darkness =

1981 video game

- Box art from the 1986 edition
- Developers: Richard Garriott; Origin Systems
- Publisher: California Pacific: Apple II California Pacific (1981) Origin Systems (1986) Atari 8-bit Sierra On-line Commodore 64 Origin Systems IBM PC Origin Systems Electronic Arts MSX2 Pony Canyon FM Towns Fujitsu Apple IIGS Vitesse Inc.
- Designers: Richard Garriott; Kenneth W. Arnold
- Series: Ultima
- Platforms: Apple II, Apple IIGS, Atari 8-bit, Commodore 64, MS-DOS, FM Towns, MSX2, NEC PC-8801, PC-98, Sharp X1
- Release: June 1981: Apple II; NA: June 1981; NA: 1986 (remake) Atari 8-bit; NA: 1983 Commodore 64; NA: 1986 (remake) IBM PC; NA: 1987 (remake); NA: 1998 (Collection) MSX2; JP: 1987; JP: 1989 (remake) FM Towns; JP: 1990 (Ultima Trilogy) Sharp X1; JP: 1988 Apple IIGS; NA: 1994 (remake)
- Genre: Role-playing
- Mode: Single-player

Ultima, later known as Ultima I: The First Age of Darkness or simply Ultima I, is the first game in the Ultima series of role-playing video games created by Richard Garriott, originally released for the Apple II. It was first published in the United States by California Pacific Computer Company, which registered a copyright for the game on September 2, 1980 and officially released it in June 1981. Since its release, the game has been completely re-coded and ported to many different platforms. The 1986 re-code of Ultima is the most commonly known and available version of the game.

Ultima revolves around a quest to find and destroy the Gem of Immortality, which is being used by the evil wizard Mondain to enslave the lands of Sosaria. With the gem in his possession, he cannot be killed, and his minions roam and terrorize the countryside. The player takes on the role of "The Stranger", an individual summoned from another world to end the rule of Mondain. The game follows the stranger's endeavors in this task, which involves progressing through many aspects of gameplay, including dungeon crawling and space travel.

The game was one of the first definitive commercial computer RPGs and is considered an important and influential turning point in the genre's development throughout the years to come. In addition to its influence on the RPG genre, it is also the first open-world computer game.

== Gameplay ==
The world of Ultima is presented in a variety of different ways. The overworld is projected in a topdown, third-person view, while dungeons are displayed in first-person, one-point perspective. In both scenarios the player character is controlled with the keyboard directional arrows; shortcut keys are used for other commands, such as A for attack and B for board.

The 1981 version of Ultima I. The player starts the game in the Lands of Lord British. The town of Paws is to the west.

Character creation at the start of Ultima is not unlike a simplified version of traditional tabletop role-playing games. The player is presented with a number of points to distribute between various statistics that will affect their competence in certain aspects of gameplay. For example, adding points to the Strength statistic will increase the amount of damage inflicted on a foe, while adding points to Charisma results in cheaper deals with merchants. Once this portion of character creation has been completed, the player is given a choice of four races: Human, Elf, Dwarf and Bobbit (a hobbit-like creature). Depending on the race picked, points will be added to various statistics (e.g. Elves receive points to their Agility statistic, while Dwarves receive Strength points). Once a race is chosen, the player is given a list of four classes to choose from, which distribute additional points to appropriate statistics. These classes are fighter, cleric, wizard and thief. The player is also asked to choose a gender for their player character, though this has no stat difference, and the simple sprite character looks the same.

Four other statistics used during gameplay are hit points, food, experience points and coin (gold in the original release). Hit points determine the health of the character; the fewer HP the character has, the closer they are to death. Hit points can be obtained in a variety of ways, including the acts of emerging alive from a dungeon and of giving tribute payment to one of the eight lords of Sosaria. Food is consumed every two tiles that the character moves, except in castles and towns; if the food supply drops to zero, the character will die. Food can be bought in towns to prevent this situation occurring. Experience points are received by successfully doing battle with monsters. They determine when the character levels up; one thousand points are needed to progress to each new level. A vital item near the end of the game cannot be obtained until the player has reached the eighth level. Coin is used to buy things in the game world, such as weapons, spells, and food, and can be obtained by defeating monsters or rescuing princesses from castles.

The outer space segment of Ultima I, showing an enemy ship. These ships resemble TIE Fighters from Star Wars.

Magic spells are bought from shops and are used as consumable items, each spell purchase having one use only. Combat is against randomly appearing enemies; it consists of each party attacking the other until one has fled or been defeated. In the original release of the game, enemies in the outdoor areas do not move around in any way but simply appear at the player's current location and immediately initiate attack; enemies in the dungeons are also random, but can move and follow the player. Buying better weapons and armor improves the character's chances of succeeding in battle.

The game also has a first-person space shooter section of gameplay, an element that only appeared in Ultima and not the subsequent games in the series. The combat was reminiscent of Doug Neubauer's Star Raiders, released a couple of years earlier for the Atari 8-bit computers, that both programmers enjoyed playing. The player participates in a real-time space combat environment, confronted with enemy spaceships that they must shoot down in order to progress further along the story. Richard Garriott says he added this just because he wanted to fill up every space there was on the disk, and do everything he possibly could.

== Plot ==
=== Setting ===
Ultima is set in the fictional world of Sosaria, a land broken into four different continents. The land is ruled by a total of eight different lords, two for each of the world's four land masses. The four continents contain two castles each, where quests can be obtained by the player. There are two types of quests given out in the castles—one entails visiting a certain location on the main map, the other killing a specific type of monster in the dungeons. Fulfilling the former type of quest gives stat boosts; the latter gains the player an important item needed to reach the endgame.

There are also a variety of towns where different goods and services can be purchased. The world has dungeons to be explored, and is populated by forests, mountain ranges, lakes and oceans. All towns are exactly alike in the original release of the game, as are all dungeons (their maps are different, but are not designed but rather randomly created); castles differ only in the different quests that may be assigned. In the 1986 remake, more variety was added to the appearance and content of the towns and castles. Sosaria is inhabited by numerous monsters and beasts that attack the player character on sight. There are also ruins and places of interest on each continent (usually in somewhat hard-to-reach places such as small islands) that the player can enter in order to receive rewards, usually in the form of a weapon or statistic boost, or in order to solve quests.

=== Characters ===
The two main characters featured in Ultima I are Mondain, the evil wizard antagonist who has induced a reign of terror over the world of Sosaria, and the protagonist, a character of the player's choosing.

The game features Lord British from Richard Garriott's first game, Akalabeth, and the introduction of characters Iolo and Shamino. These three characters become staples of nearly all future Ultima games (see List of Ultima characters).

=== Story ===
The story of Ultima I revolves around the evil wizard Mondain and his rule over the kingdom of Sosaria. According to the game's back story, Mondain created an evil gem over 1000 years ago that granted him immortality. Since then, Mondain has released monsters and beasts upon the land that ravage the villages and towns of Sosaria and cause most of the nobles to bicker amongst themselves. In an effort to stop Mondain's dominion, Lord British searches for a person to bring about the wizard's end. This call is answered by the player.

The player is informed that the only way to defeat Mondain is to travel back in time and kill him before the gem of immortality is created. The majority of the game is spent searching for a time machine, and a way to activate it. Four of the lords in the game, one from each realm, hold a gem that will allow the time machine to work once all four gems have been found. In exchange for the gem, the lord will ask the player to complete a quest that involves traveling into a dungeon and killing a specific creature. Once this has been achieved, the lord will hand over his gem.

The time machine itself also needs to be found. Purchasing a space shuttle and traveling into outer space is a prerequisite of this —the player must become a space ace, by destroying 20 enemy ships, in order to complete the game. Once this task has been completed, rescuing a princess will reveal the location of the time machine, which always appears to the north of the castle in which the princess was held prisoner. The main character will then travel back in time and face Mondain before he has completed the gem of immortality. Destroying the gem is a requirement for beating the game as well as killing the wizard himself. Once Mondain is dead, the player is transported one thousand years into the future and rewarded by Lord British.

== Development and release ==
The 1986 MS-DOS remake of Ultima I

Richard Garriott started development on Ultima after the unexpected success of his previous game, Akalabeth. Large sections of Akalabeth were used as subroutines within Ultima in order to create the first-person dungeon sections of the game. Towns, quests, a plot and a user interface were all added to the original Akalabeth code before Ultima was completed. Star Wars elements were also added, including spaceships and lightsabers.

Development of Ultima was done during Garriott's freshman year at the University of Texas with the help of a friend, Ken W. Arnold; they finished it in less than a year. Ultima was coded in Applesoft BASIC on an Apple II computer, and Arnold wrote code in assembly language for the tile-based graphics system, the first game in the genre to do so.

Unlike Akalabeth, the commercial sale of which was an afterthought to a hobbyist endeavor, Ultima was approached with a much more professional attitude right from the start of the project. The game was first planned to be called Ultimatum, but it was discovered that the name was already in use by a board game company, and so it was shortened to Ultima. Garriott later commented on the title, "When I wrote the first game, of course I had no idea there would ever be a second." The California Pacific Computer Company published Ultima in 1981 for the Apple II only. By June 1982 it sold 20,000 copies, and went on to sell 50,000 copies. By 1990, the game earned $300,000.

Sierra Online re-released Ultima for the Atari 8-bit computers. In 1986 Origin Systems completely re-coded the game in assembly language and re-released it. It had significantly improved running speed and was able to handle superior graphics. Some small cosmetic changes to the content were also made, such as the addition of another castle map variant and three new city maps, the introduction of traveling monsters in the outdoors section, and the division of the money the player has into separate "copper", "silver" and "gold" coins. It was first released for the Apple II on December 23, 1986 as Ultima I: The First Age of Darkness. Ports for the Commodore 64 and MS-DOS EGA were also released.

Later releases include the 1989 version for the MSX2, published only in Japan by Pony Canyon, and an Apple IIGS specific port in late 1994 by Vitesse. In 1997, the EGA version of Ultima was released by Electronic Arts as part of the Ultima Collection.

In 2022 the game received a visual overhaul from modder Jeremy Abrahamson that used the Ultima IV: Quest of the Avatar tile set to provide the game a consistent look and feel to the most famous entry.

== Reception ==
Softline stated in 1981 that "Ultima seems to be the best" available Apple II role-playing game. The magazine called the graphics "impressive" and concluded that it "retails for $39.95 and is well worth the price". Deirdre L. Maloy reviewed the game for Computer Gaming World, and stated that "Ultima is one of the best computer fantasy roleplaying games to date."

Computer Gaming World in 1991 and 1993 called the game "truly epic in scope", stating that it was among the first to have outdoor settings and NPC conversations. While noting the "unbalanced combat system", the magazine concluded that Ultima I was "a classic not to be missed".
