= Creative Computing (magazine) =

Periodical literature

- April 1980 issue
- Editor-in-Chief: David H. Ahl
- Founder: David H. Ahl
- First issue: October 1974
- Final issue: December 1985
- Company: Ziff-Davis
- Country: United States
- Language: English
- ISSN: 0097-8140

Creative Computing was one of the earliest magazines covering the microcomputer revolution. Published from October 1974 until December 1985, the magazine covered the spectrum of hobbyist/home/personal computing in a more accessible format than the rather technically oriented Byte.

The magazine was created to cover educational-related topics. Early issues include articles on the use of computers in the classroom, various simple programs like madlibs and various programming challenges, mostly in BASIC. By the late 1970s, it had moved towards more general coverage as the microcomputer market emerged. Hardware coverage became more common, but type-in programs remained common into the early 1980s.

The company published several books, the most successful being BASIC Computer Games, the first million-selling computer book. Their Best of Creative Computing collections were also popular. Creative Computing also published software on cassette and floppy disk for the popular computer systems of the time and had a small hardware business.

Ziff Davis purchased Creative Computing in 1982 and closed the non-magazine endeavors.

== History ==
=== DEC and Edu ===
Prior to starting Creative Computing, in the early 1970s David H. Ahl was working in the educational department of Digital Equipment Corporation (DEC) where he started publication of their Edu newsletter in the spring of 1971. At the time, DEC had an estimated 2,000 to 3,000 machines being used in educational settings, so he was surprised to find the number of subscribers reach 20,000 after 18 months. He found that many subscribers did not have a DEC machine but were using Edu as a source of general information on computers in educational settings. This began his earliest thoughts about a non-DEC magazine aimed at this market.

On 22 February 1973, Ahl was let go during a downsizing at DEC. Even before he received his last paycheck, he was hired by a different department to help develop new low-end versions of the DEC minicomputer line. During this period he collected many user submissions to Edu and convinced DEC to publish 101 BASIC Computer Games in the summer of 1973. This was a hit, eventually selling over 10,000 copies in three publishing runs in July 1973, April 1974, and March 1975.

By 1974, the team had produced two new designs, a PDP-8 combined with a VT50 terminal, and a briefcase-sized version of the PDP-8 with a small floppy disk that would be used with an external computer terminal. Other divisions within DEC saw these inexpensive machines as a threat to their own products and agitated against them, causing debates that eventually worked their way to the CEO. When the new designs were personally canceled by Ken Olsen with the statement that "I can't see any reason that anyone would want a computer of his own" Ahl quit DEC and took a position at AT&T.

=== Formation ===
It was at this point that Ahl decided to move ahead with the educational-focused magazine. Reasoning that the educational market would be of interest to public foundations and many companies, Ahl sent funding proposals to over a hundred companies and received nothing. Instead, he used his own funds to print 11,000 copies of a flier that he sent to Hewlett-Packard and other minicomputer vendors, which resulted in 850 subscriptions to a magazine that did not even exist yet. (Note: The later narrative in Anderson puts the number of 600.)

Instead of printing 850 copies, Ahl split the subscription money in two; he kept one half for future operations, and used the other half to print as many copies of the new magazine as he could. This allowed for the printing of 8,000 copies of the first edition, which were completed on 7 October 1974. The subscribers were sent their copies first, but the rest were sent for free to a wide variety of companies, libraries and schools. He followed the same pattern for the next three issues. The trick worked, and subscriptions began to pour in. During this period the magazine was based in Morristown, New Jersey.

=== Growth ===
Back of the April 1980 issue, with a parody of other computer magazines

By August 1975 the magazine had 2,500 subscribers. In January, the Altair 8800 had been announced and Ahl began looking for new authors who could write for the exploding microcomputer market. By 1976 the content was roughly split between the education and microcomputing market. At that point, the magazine started actively looking for advertisers and the November/December 1976 issue was the first to be printed on coated paper rather than newsprint to provide better quality ads.

By 1978 the subscriptions hit 60,000, and revenue was approaching $1 million. In July 1978, Ahl quit his position at AT&T to work at Creative Computing full time. This caused friction with his wife. In August, they purchased ROM magazine (Note: Unrelated to the Atari-related publication of a few years later.) and two smaller newsletters and combined their content into the magazine. In January 1979, the magazine went monthly from bimonthly.

By 1979 the magazine had outgrown the single-family home it was being run from, and Ahl looked for a larger duplex home that would allow him to live with his wife in one half and run the magazine from the other. It was at this time that Regis McKenna, the advertising company handling Apple Computer, was asked to pay an overdue advertising bill. The advertising company provided a canceled check proving they had already done so. When Ahl and his business manager began tracking it down, the police were called and found that two people in their company had embezzled $100,000 by sending some incoming cheques to their own account at a different bank. This was only discovered because one of the conspirators had forgotten to mark the bill with McKenna as paid, causing a second invoice to be sent out.

When she was told the story, Ahl's wife had enough and kicked him out of the house pending a divorce. He moved into the only unused room in the other side of the building. During this time, Ted Nelson, known for the invention of hypertext, was briefly the editor. Nelson would arrive at 5 pm and work all night, waking Ahl in the bedroom when he started printing on a Qume daisy wheel printer. In October 1980 the company moved to a much larger 25,000 square feet (2,300 m^{2}) office building.

Through this period, featured writers included Robert Swirsky, David Lubar, and John J. Anderson. The magazine regularly included BASIC source code for utility programs and games, which users could manually enter into their home computers. The April issues, starting in 1980, became famous for their parodies of the major computer magazines of the time.

=== Ziff-Davis ===
Larger publishers began taking note of the computer market. A watershed moment was in 1979 when McGraw-Hill purchased Byte. By 1982, most of the quality magazines had been purchased and only a few large ones remained independent, including Compute!, Interface Age, Family Computing (Note: Although Ahl mentions Family Computing in an interview, this magazine actually started publication in 1983, so it is likely he has confused the name.) and Creative Computing.

Realizing they were being pushed out of the market due to the huge budgets and marketing power of these major players, in 1982 Ahl approached several potential buyers, including Atari, CBS (Note: CBS ran a magazine division at the time.) and Ziff-Davis. In 1982 Ahl sold the company to Ziff-Davis, which at that time published 28 different magazines. Ahl remained the Editor-in-Chief. The magazine moved to Los Angeles, California. At their peak, the magazine reached about 500,000 subscriptions.

Through the early 1980s, and especially with the launch of the IBM PC, the market began to shift from a hobby-and-educational oriented one to more and more business applications. Ziff quickly shifted the focus of the magazine to be more software-oriented, and the programming articles disappeared shortly after the sale. This attempt to refocus on business computing was not successful, and when Bill Ziff had a cancer scare in 1985 he began concentrating his businesses, selling off many of the specialty magazines. Ziff ultimately ceased publication of Creative Computing in December 1985.

== Other magazines ==
The company also began publication of several other magazines at different times, but none of these were very successful and tended to have very short production runs. Among these were Small Business Computing, Sync Magazine for the ZX81, and Video and Arcade Games.

== Books ==
The company also published several books. Among these were three volumes of The Best of Creative Computing Magazine (Creative Computing Press) in 1976, 1977, and 1980. The cover of volume 2 was illustrated by underground cartoonist Gilbert Shelton. 101 BASIC Computer Games was ported to Microsoft BASIC and published in 1978 as BASIC Computer Games. It became the first million-selling computer book. This was followed by More BASIC Computer Games in 1979.

It also published the first The Best of Byte collection, in spite of being friendly competitors with Byte. The relationship ended with the McGraw-Hill purchase.

== Software ==
Box art style used by Creative Computing Software

A number of home computer games were published under the Sensational Software banner, also known as Creative Computing Software. Their best seller was a version of Space Invaders for the Apple II. Ziff-Davis closed the division as they felt it competed with their advertisers.

Titles included:

- Air Traffic Controller (1979)
  Released on cassette for the TRS-80 and Apple II.
- Space Games-3 (1980) CS-3002
  A collection of 4 games, containing Ultratrek, Romulan, Starwars, Starlanes; released on cassette for the TRS-80.
- Space and Sport Games (1980)
  A collection of 9 games, with 3 space games amongst them. Released on diskette for the Apple II.
- Super Invasion/Spacewar (1980)
  A collection of 2 games, containing Super Invasion and Spacewar; released on diskette for the Apple II.
- Action & Bumping Games (1981)
  A collection of 6 games, containing Bumper Blocks, Obstacle Course, Hustle Jr., Moto Jump, Mine Rover, Road Machine; released on diskette for the Apple II.
- Milestones (1981)
  Released on cassette and diskette for the Apple II.
- Micro Golf (1981)

== Hardware ==
The company briefly sold hardware under the Peripherals Plus brand. The main product was a music card for the Apple II, and they offered a plotter and other products. Ziff closed this division as well.
