= Cayeux (surname) =

Cayeux is a surname. Notable people with the surname include:

- Anseau de Cayeux, a French knight from Picardy
- Caroline Cayeux (born 1948), French politician
- Laetitia Garriott de Cayeux (born 1978), American entrepreneur
- Lucien Cayeux (1864–1944), French sedimentary petrographer
- Marc Cayeux (born 1978), Zimbabwean professional golfer
- Richard Garriott de Cayeux (born 1961), American video game developer and private astronaut

== Other ==
- Cayeux (disambiguation)
