= Michael Fincke =

American astronaut and USAF colonel (born 1967)

Mike Fincke
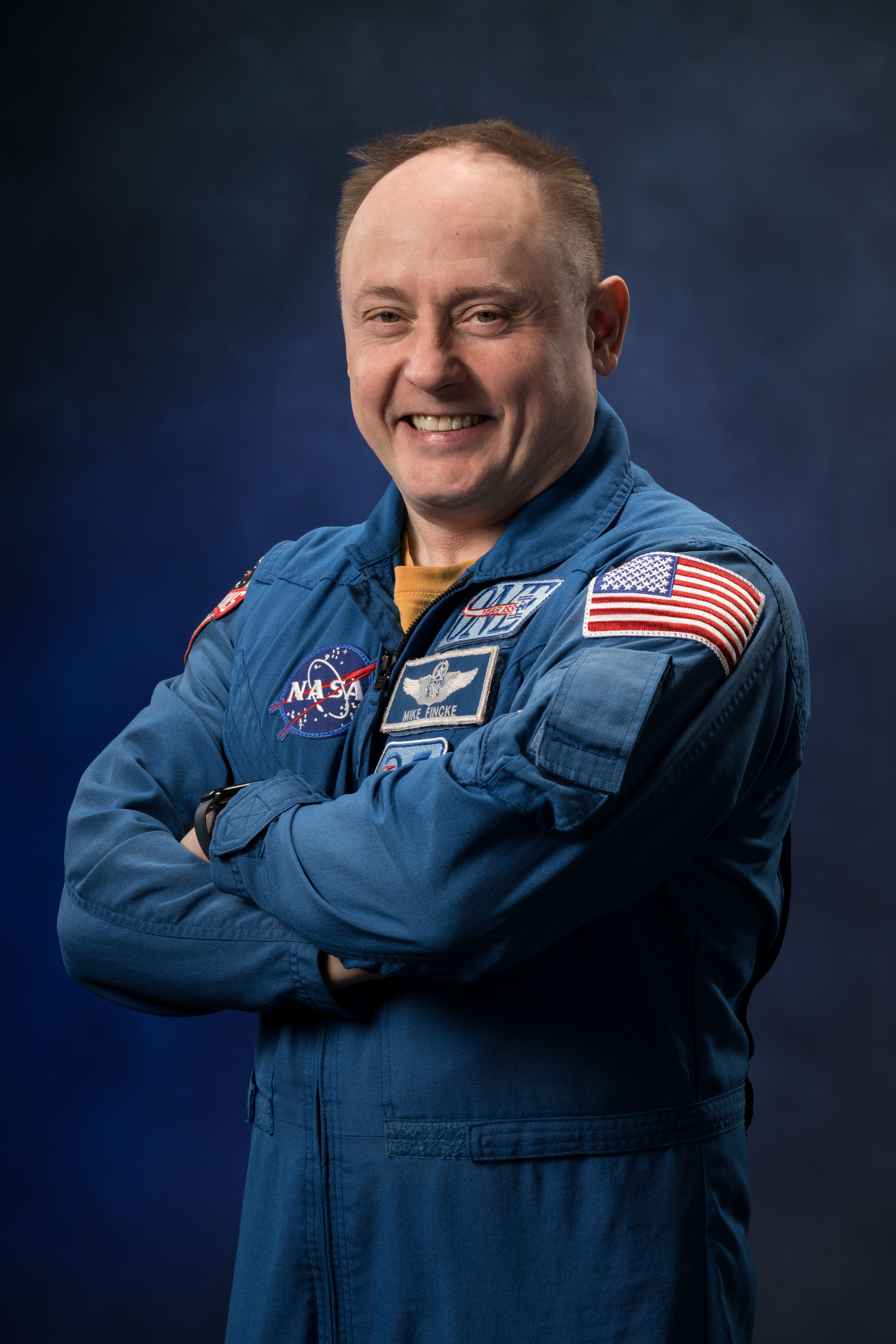
- Fincke in 2025
- Born: Edward Michael Fincke; March 14, 1967 (age 59); Pittsburgh, Pennsylvania, U.S.
- Other name: Spanky
- Education: Massachusetts Institute of Technology (BS); Stanford University (MS); El Camino College (AS); University of Houston–Clear Lake (MS)
- Spouse: Renita Saikia
- Children: 3
- Space career

NASA astronaut
- Rank: Colonel, U.S. Air Force (retired)
- Time in space: 548 days, 8 hours, 8 minutes
- Selection: NASA Group 16 (1996)
- Total EVAs: 9
- Total EVA time: 48 hours, 37 minutes
- Missions: Soyuz TMA-4 (Expedition 9); Soyuz TMA-13 (Expedition 18); STS-134; SpaceX Crew-11 (Expedition 73/74)
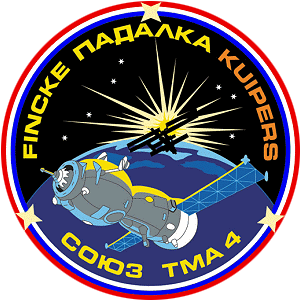
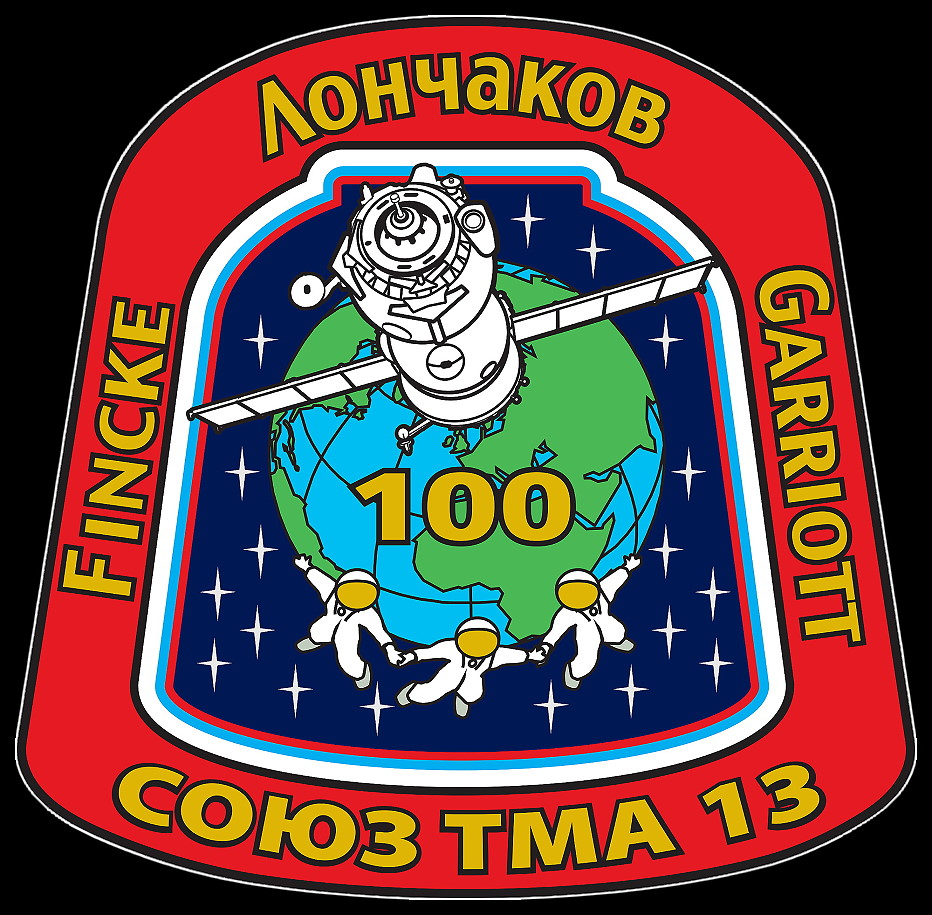
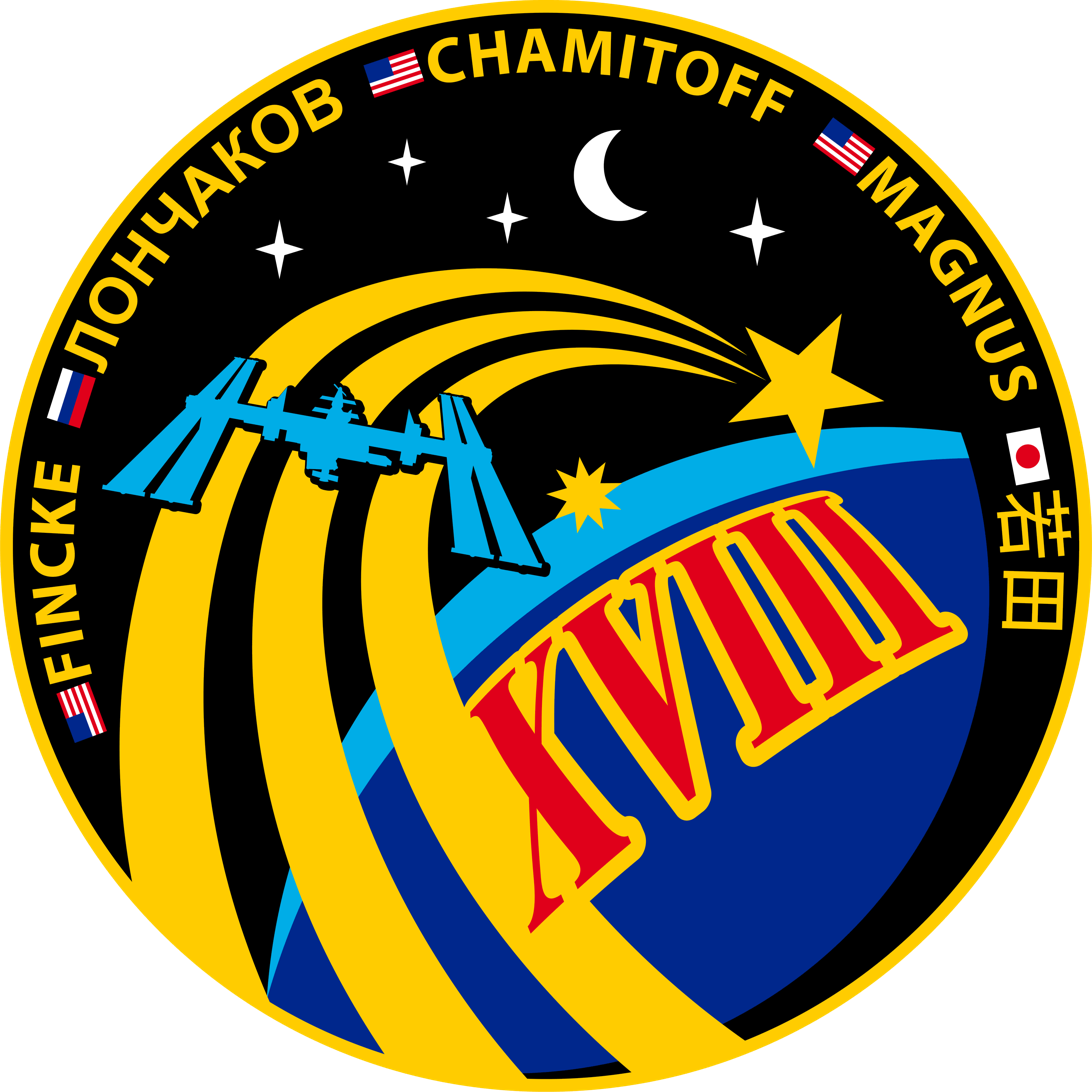
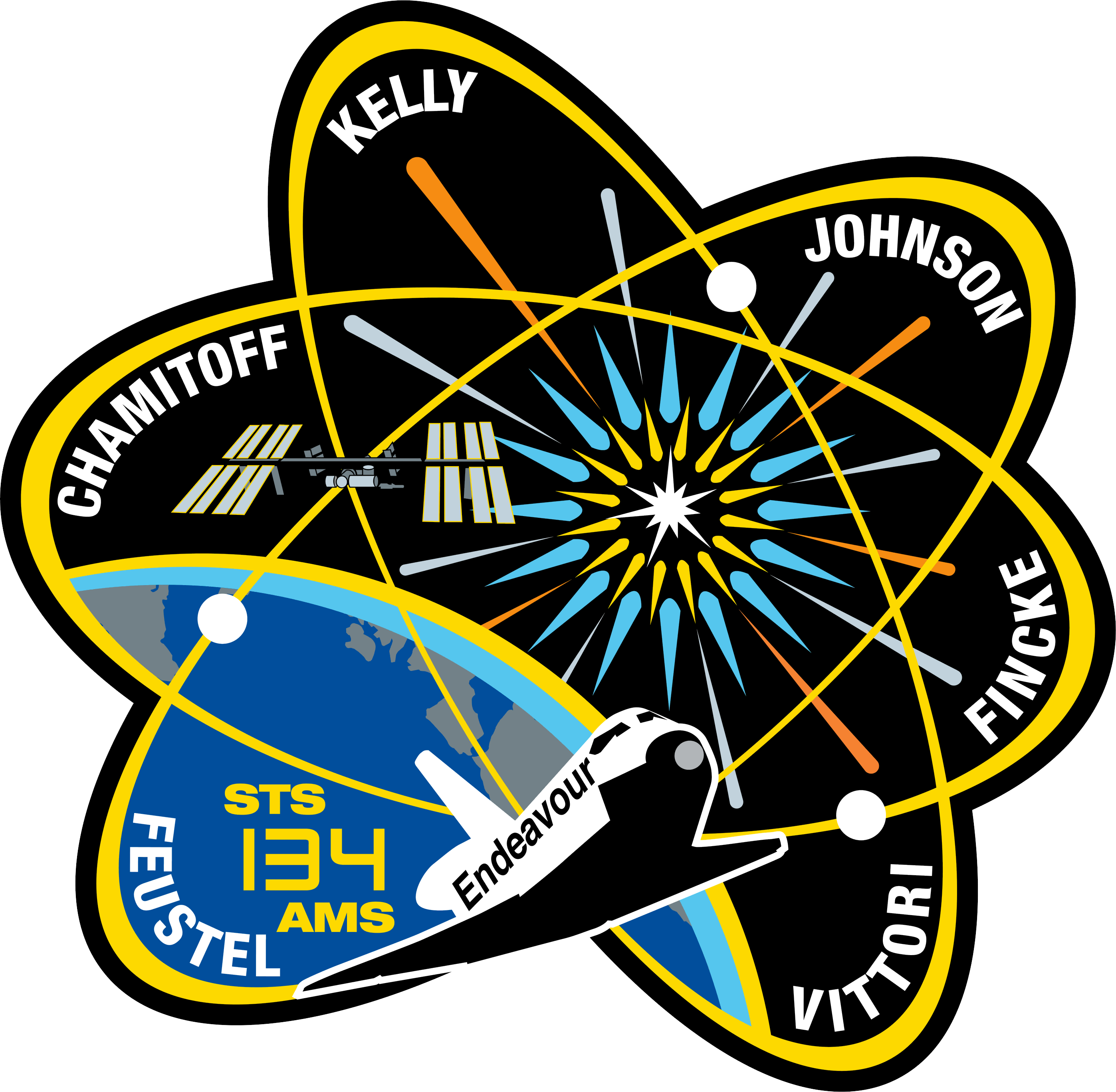
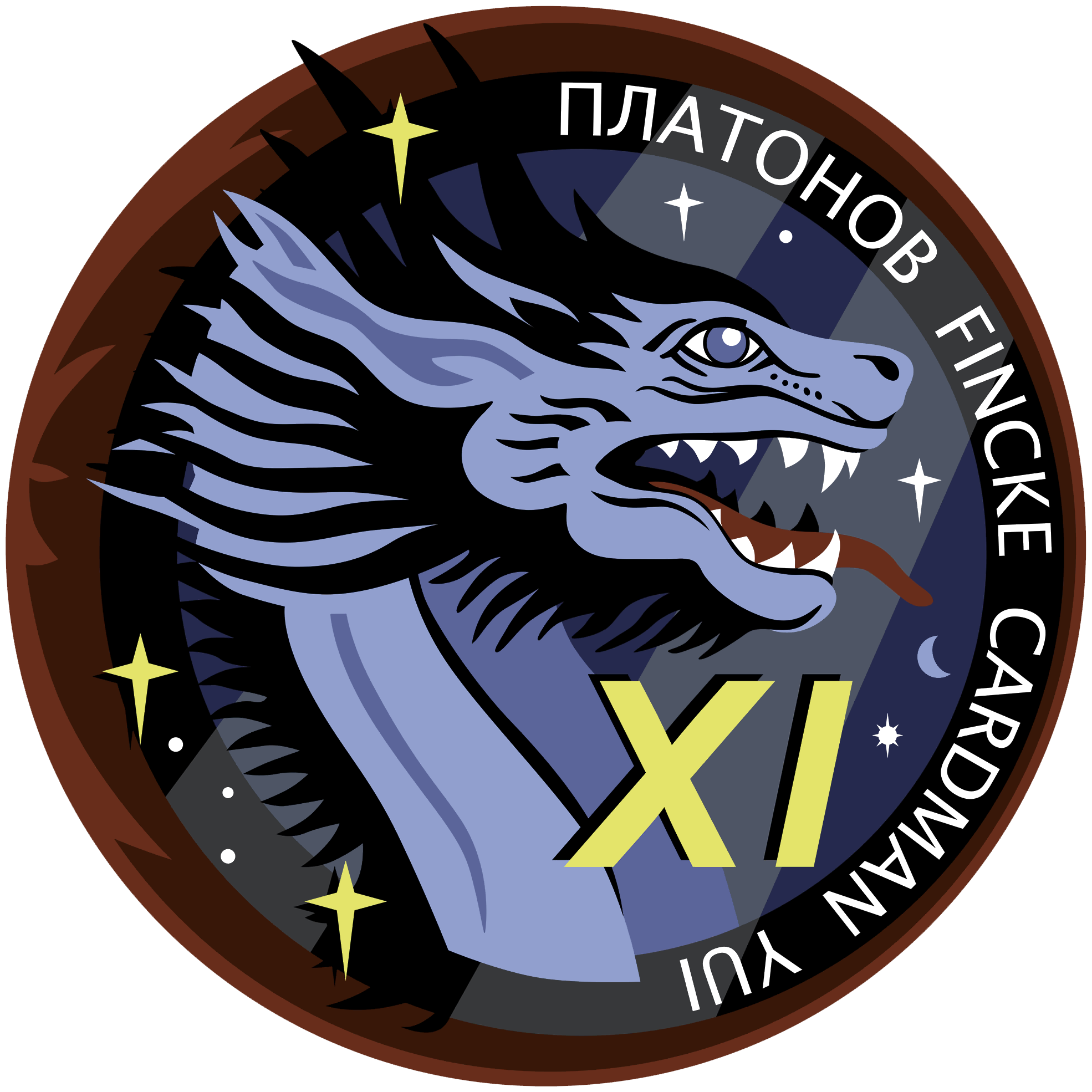
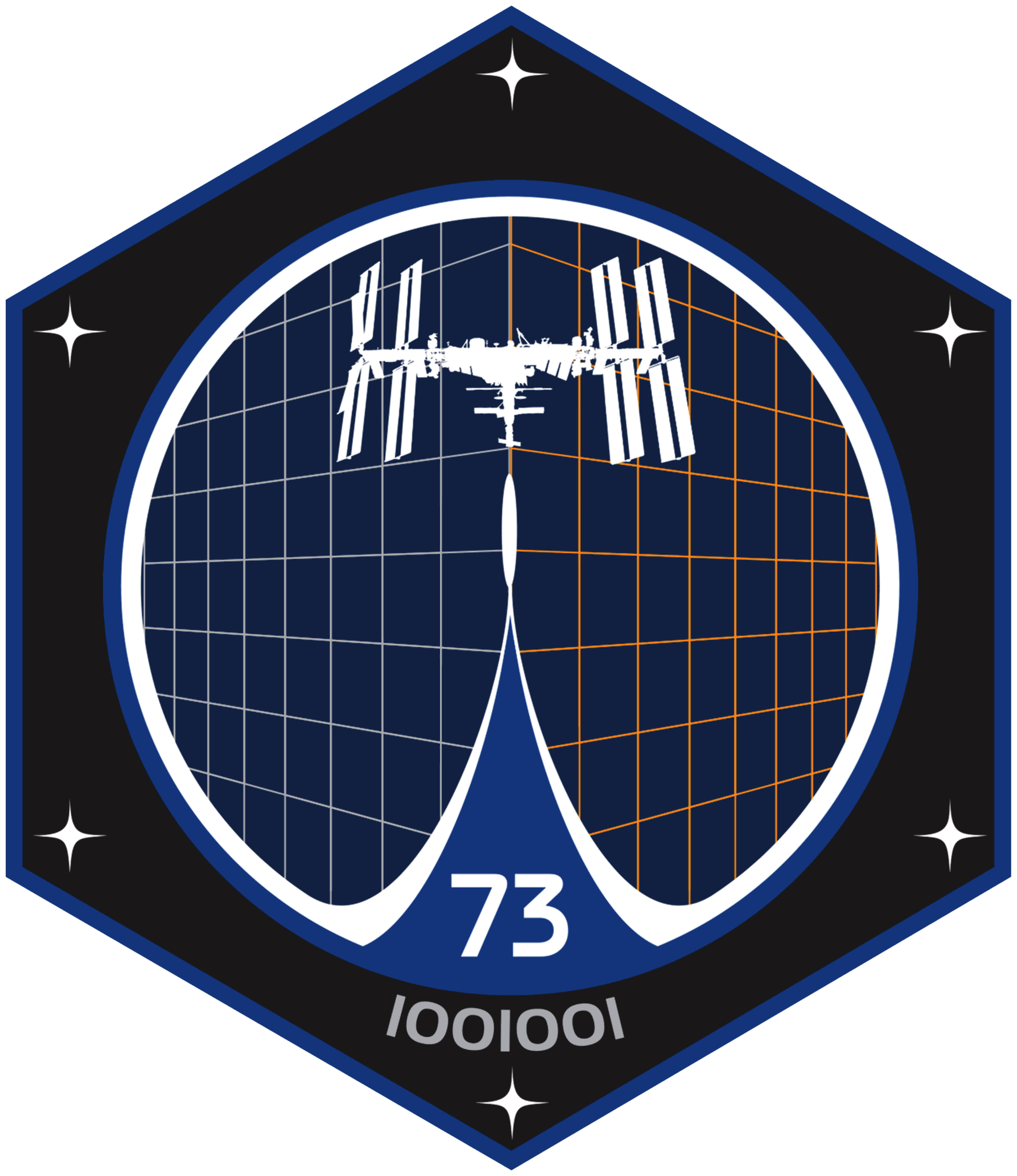
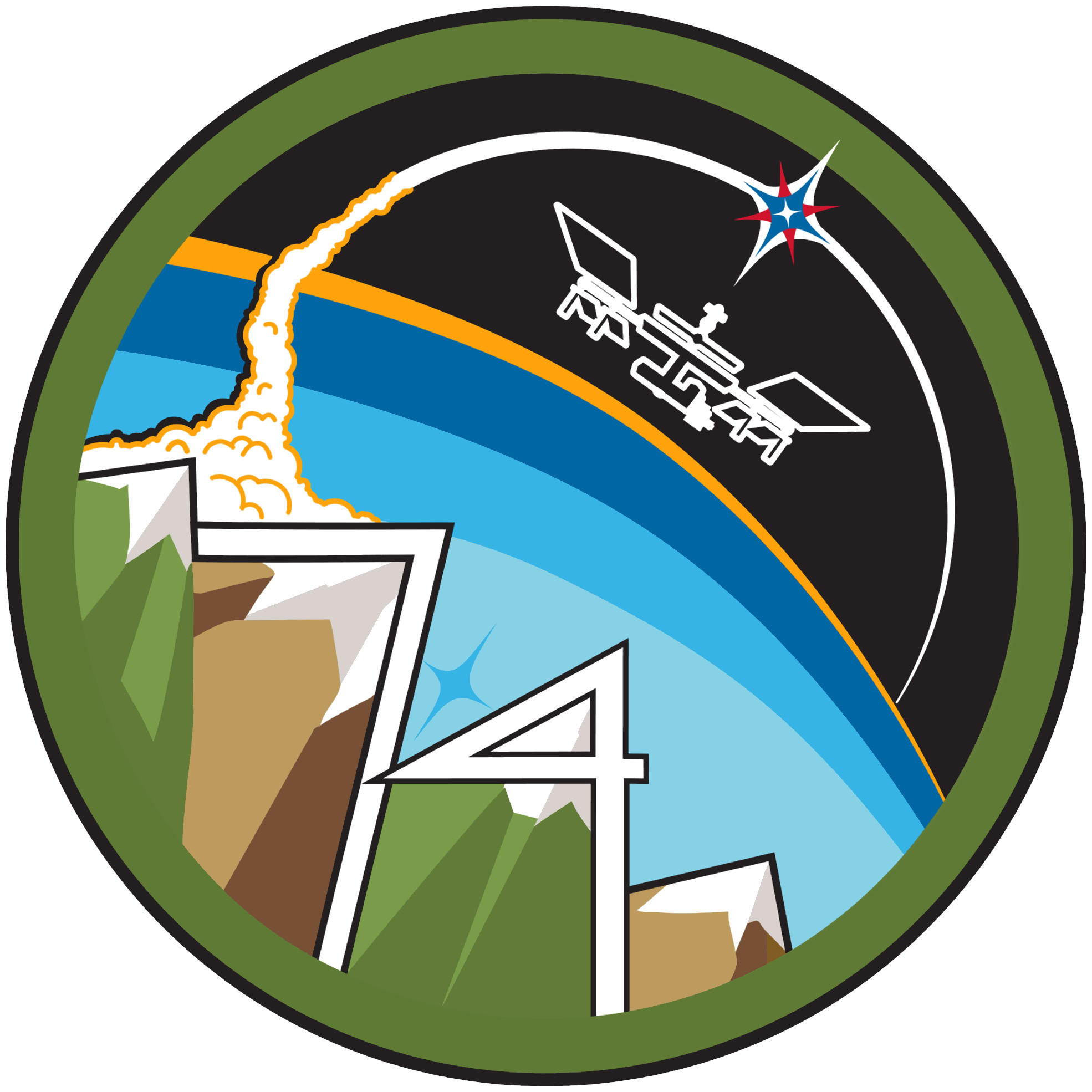
- Mission insignia
- Retired: August 12, 2026

Edward Michael Fincke (born March 14, 1967) is an American former NASA astronaut and retired United States Air Force colonel. He is fourth among NASA astronauts ranked by time spent in space, tallying up over 549 days. Fincke has logged nine spacewalks, totaling 48 hours and 37 minutes of EVA time. He is unique in that six of those spacewalks were in a Russian Orlan spacesuit. NASA certified Fincke as a pilot for both Boeing Starliner and SpaceX Crew Dragon. He was also trained as a co-pilot/flight engineer on the Soyuz and a mission specialist on the Space Shuttle.

He is a veteran of three long-duration missions aboard the International Space Station as a flight engineer on Expedition 9, as commander of Expedition 18, and as a flight engineer on Expedition 73 and commander of Expedition 74, as well as one Space Shuttle mission, STS-134, as a mission specialist. During Expedition 74, Finke developed a medical condition that made him the first person and crew to be evacuated from the ISS over a medical issue. He and the crew returned safely to the Earth in January 2026 approximately one month earlier than planned. He retired from NASA in August 2026 after 30 years with the agency. Finke also retired from the United States Air Force.

== Early life and education ==
Fincke was born in Pittsburgh, Pennsylvania but considers its suburb Emsworth to be his hometown. Fincke graduated from Sewickley Academy in Sewickley, Pennsylvania, in 1985.

He attended the Massachusetts Institute of Technology on an Air Force ROTC scholarship and graduated in 1989 with a Bachelor of Science degree in aeronautics and astronautics as well as a Bachelor of Science degree in Earth, atmospheric and planetary sciences. He then received a Master of Science degree in aeronautics and astronautics from Stanford University in 1990, and a second Master of Science degree in planetary geology from the University of Houston–Clear Lake in 2001. He also attended El Camino College in Torrance, California, where he studied Japanese and geology, and Community College of Allegheny County in Pittsburgh.

== Military career ==
Immediately after graduating from MIT in 1989, Fincke attended a summer exchange program with the Moscow Aviation Institute in the former Soviet Union, now Russia, where he studied Cosmonautics. After graduation from Stanford University in 1990, Fincke entered the United States Air Force where he was assigned to the Air Force Space and Missiles Systems Center, Los Angeles Air Force Base in California. There, he served as a Space Systems Engineer and a Space Test Engineer. In 1994, upon completion of the U.S. Air Force Test Pilot School, Edwards Air Force Base in California, Fincke joined the 39th Flight Test Squadron, Eglin Air Force Base in Florida, where he served as a flight test engineer working on a variety of flight test programs, flying the F-16 and F-15 aircraft. In January 1996, he reported to the Gifu Test Center, Gifu Air Base in Japan, where he was the United States flight test liaison to the Japanese/United States XF-2 fighter program. By 2024, Fincke had accumulated over 2000 flight hours in more than 30 different varieties of aircraft and held the rank of colonel. Fincke belongs to the Association of Space Explorers and The Explorers Club.

== NASA career ==
Fincke was selected by NASA in April 1996 to be an astronaut. He reported to the Johnson Space Center in August 1996. Having completed two years of training and evaluation, he was assigned technical duties in the Astronaut Office Station Operations Branch serving as an International Space Station spacecraft communicator (ISS CAPCOM), a member of the Crew Test Support Team in Russia and as the ISS crew procedures team lead.

In July 1999, Fincke was assigned as backup crewmember for the International Space Station Expedition 4 crew. Additionally, he served as a backup for the ISS Expedition 6 crew and was qualified to fly as a left-seat flight engineer (co-pilot) on the Russian Soyuz spacecraft.

He was the commander of the second NASA Extreme Environment Mission Operations (NEEMO 2) mission, living and working underwater for 7 days in May 2002.

In 2013, Fincke served as cavenaut into the ESA CAVES training in Sardinia, alongside Soichi Noguchi, Andreas Mogensen, Nikolai Tikhonov, Andrew Feustel, and David Saint-Jacques.

=== Expedition 9 ===
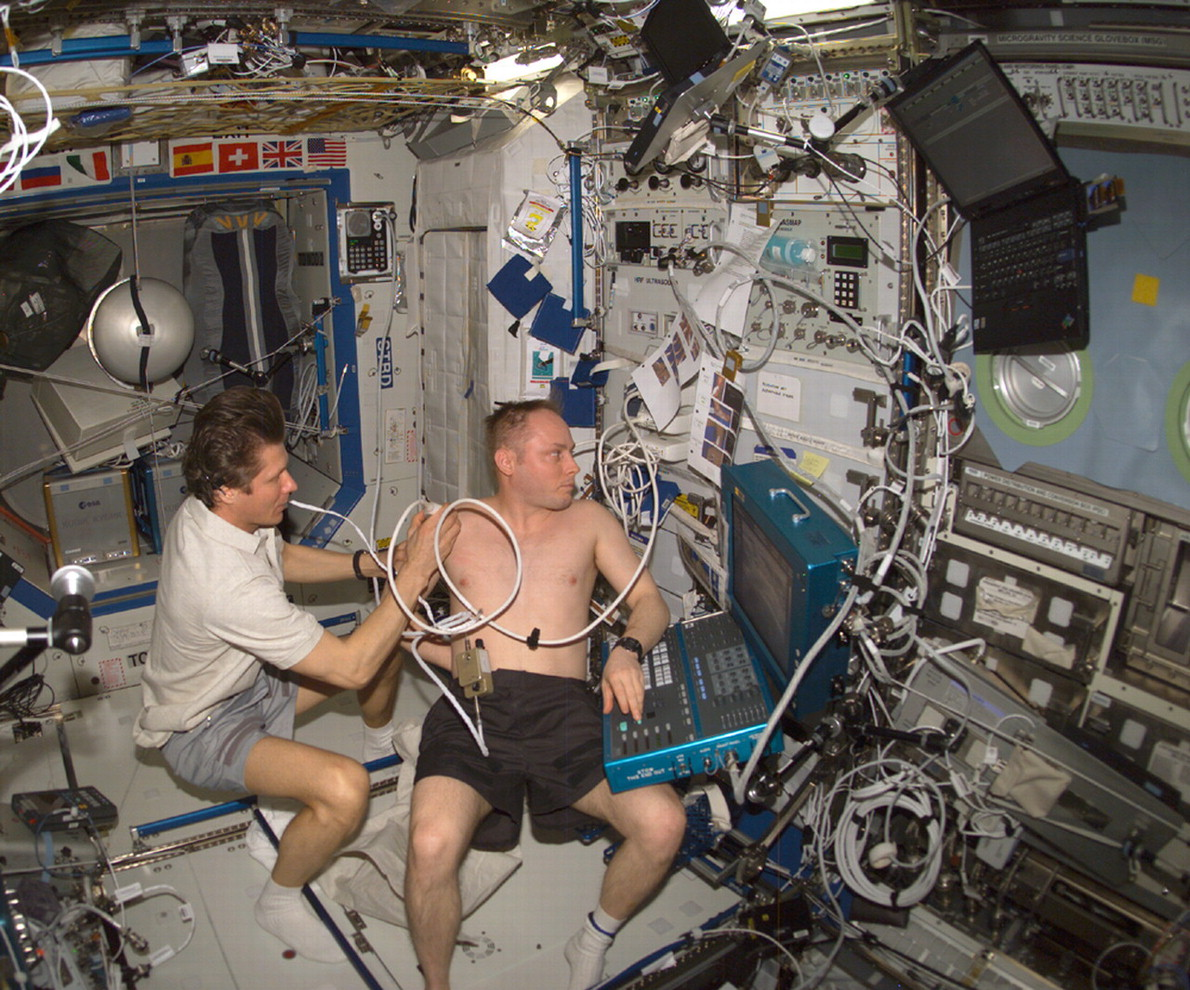
Gennady Padalka performs an ultrasound exam on Fincke during Expedition 9

Fincke was the space station science officer and flight engineer for ISS Expedition 9 from April 18 through October 23, 2004. The mission was launched from the Baikonur Cosmodrome in Kazakhstan aboard the Soyuz TMA-4 spacecraft and docked with the International Space Station on April 21, 2004. Fincke spent six months aboard the ISS continuing ISS science operations, maintaining station systems, and performing four spacewalks. Expedition 9 concluded with undocking from the station and safe landing back in Kazakhstan on October 23, 2004. Fincke completed his first mission in 187 days, 21 hours, and 17 minutes, and logged a total of 15 hours, 45 minutes, and 22 seconds of EVA time in four spacewalks.

Fincke was the backup commander for Expedition 13 and Expedition 16.

=== Expedition 18 ===
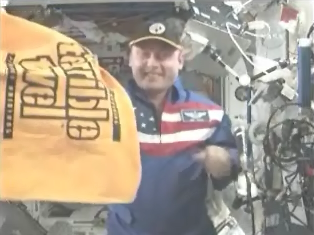
Fincke holds a Terrible Towel to support the Pittsburgh Steelers

Fincke was commander of Expedition 18. He arrived at the International Space Station aboard the Soyuz TMA-13 on October 14, 2008 with cosmonaut Yuri Lonchakov and space flight participant Richard Garriott. While Richard Garriott was aboard, Fincke participated during his personal time (along with Yury Lonchakov, Gregory Chamitoff, and Richard Garriott) in filming and starring in a science-fiction movie made in space, Apogee of Fear. On April 8, 2009, Fincke, Lonchakov, and space tourist Charles Simonyi returned to Earth aboard the TMA-13.

Replacing Fincke as commander of the space station was Gennady Padalka, whom he served with on Expedition 9.

=== STS-134 ===
Fincke was a mission specialist on STS-134, which was his only flight on the Space Shuttle. Fincke made three spacewalks during the mission. He completed 26 hours and 12 minutes of spacewalking time, bringing his total EVA time to 48 hours and 37 minutes. As of July 2025, this places him 17th all time on the list of spacewalkers.

=== Commercial Crew Program ===
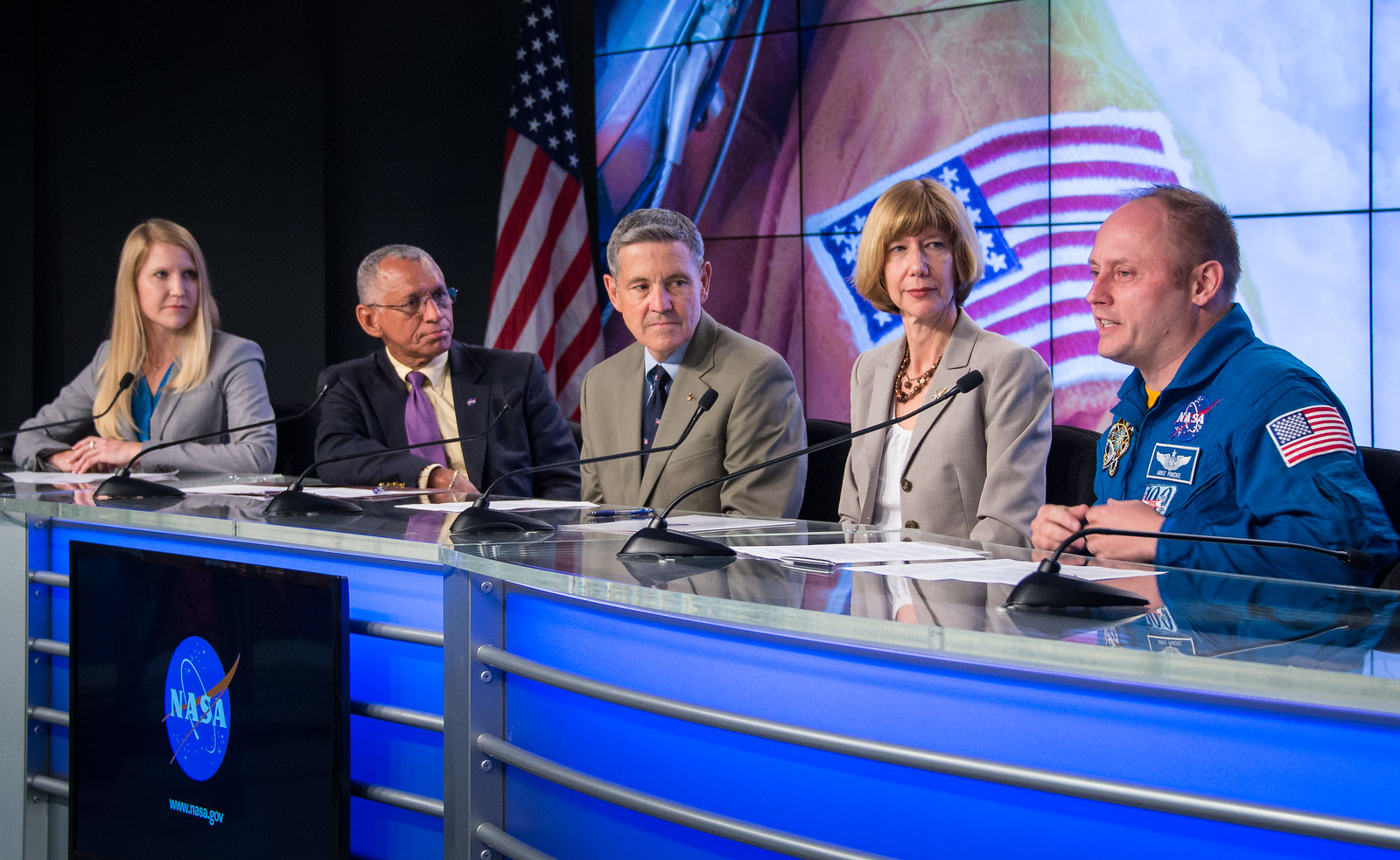
Fincke on podium for the announcement of both Boeing and SpaceX as the providers for the Commercial Crew Program's CCTCap program in 2014

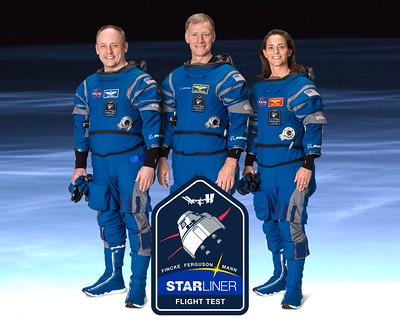
Fincke, Ferguson, Mann - one of the original CFT crews. 2019-2020

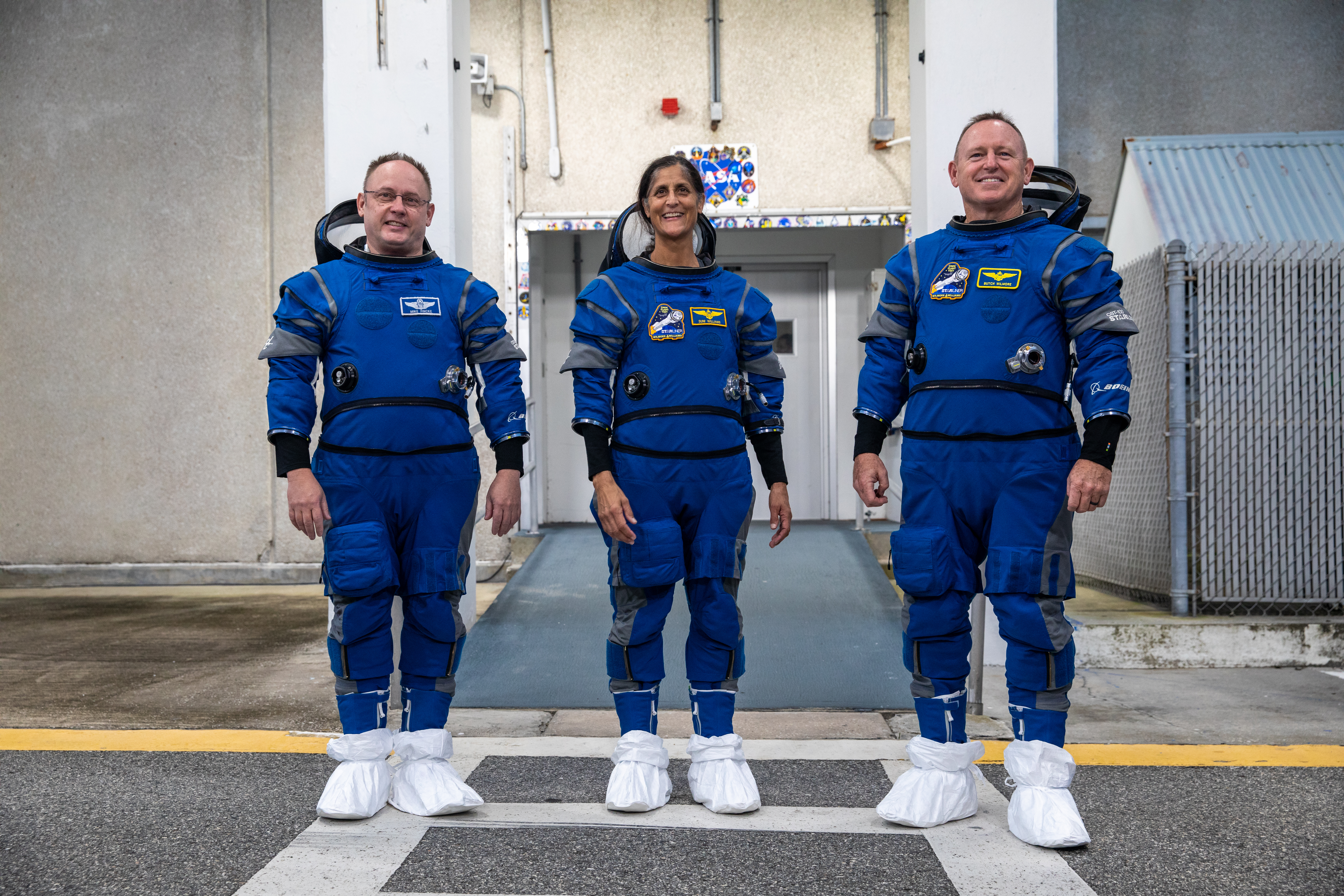
Fincke (left) with Sunita Williams (center) and Barry Wilmore (right) as they prepare to test the Starliner crew module.

Fincke has been deeply involved with NASA's Commercial Crew Program for over a decade. From 2014-2019, he served as the Astronaut Office Chief of the Commercial Crew Branch during the original Commercial Crew Transportation Capability (CCtCap) contracts award. He has contributed significantly to the development of both the SpaceX Crew Dragon and Boeing CST-100 Starliner spacecraft.

In January 2019, NASA announced that Fincke would fly on CST-100 Starliner's Boeing Crew Flight Test. However, in June 2022, NASA revised the mission to a two-person flight test with Fincke serving as the backup spacecraft test pilot. On September 30, 2022, NASA announced that Fincke would fly as the pilot on the Starliner's first operational mission, Boeing Starliner-1 (PCM-1). However, in March 2025, he was announced as the pilot of SpaceX Crew-11 due to testing with the Boeing Starliner Calypso following technical issues during the Boeing Crew Flight Test.

Fincke has been certified as a co-pilot/flight engineer for the Soyuz, a mission specialist for the flight deck crew of the Space Shuttle, and a pilot for Starliner and Crew Dragon. His extensive work in spacecraft development included significant contributions to Starliner's development through his work in the Avionics and Software Integration Lab (ASIL), focusing on flight software refinement, systems integration, and human-spacecraft interfaces.

Throughout his career, Fincke has remained at the forefront of testing and developing human-rated spacecraft, leveraging his engineering, flight test, and astronaut experience to contribute to the next era of space exploration.

=== Expedition 73/74 ===
A first attempt to launch the SpaceX Falcon 9/Crew Dragon was aborted on July 31, 2025 due to weather conditions over the Kennedy Space Center's Launch Complex 39A. On August 1, 2025, Fincke launched on NASA's SpaceX Crew-11 mission to the International Space Station, where he served as a member of the Expedition 73/74 crew.

==== Medical incident and early return ====
On January 7, 2026, Fincke experienced an undisclosed "medical situation" that prompted NASA to shorten the mission. The incident led to the cancellation of two planned spacewalks on January 8 and 15, including preparations for installation of ISS Roll-Out Solar Arrays (iROSAs) and other maintenance tasks on the Harmony module and the station's S6 and S4 truss. At a news conference on January 8, 2026, NASA administrator Jared Isaacman announced that Crew-11 would return to Earth earlier than planned due to the medical situation. Crew-11 ultimately splashed down on January 15, 2026 about a month earlier than planned.

In a statement on February 25, 2026, Fincke revealed that he experienced the medical event. He said that the event required immediate attention from his crewmates, and thanks to their actions under the guidance of NASA flight surgeons, he was quickly stabilized. He said that the decision to return home early was driven by a desire to take advantage of advanced medical imaging not available on the space station. After splashdown, Fincke was treated at Scripps Memorial Hospital La Jolla and stated that he is subsequently doing "very well". A few days later, he revealed that he had lost the ability to speak for approximately 20 minutes during his medical emergency. Despite extensive testing, doctors were unable to determine the cause. While they ruled out choking or a heart attack, they considered whether the loss of speech could be linked to his 549 days in weightlessness.

Fincke retired from NASA on August 12, 2026.

== Acting ==
- Fincke was a guest star on the final episode of Star Trek: Enterprise along with fellow astronaut Terry Virts.
- He was also featured in the Star Trek: First Contact Blu-ray special features, talking about what it is like to work in space and how Star Trek influences people to believe in the magic of space travel.
- Fincke appeared in The Wiggles video Wiggle Around the Clock (2006), demonstrating a space suit.
- Fincke voiced himself in the Season 14 Arthur episode "Buster Spaces Out".
- Fincke also appeared in Man on a Mission: Richard Garriott's Road to the Stars, a documentary based on Richard Garriott's spaceflight as a fellow astronaut who launched to the ISS with him on a Soyuz spacecraft.

== Awards and decorations ==
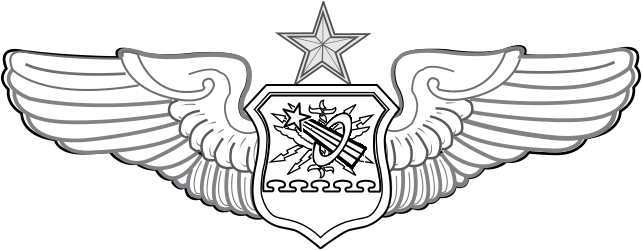
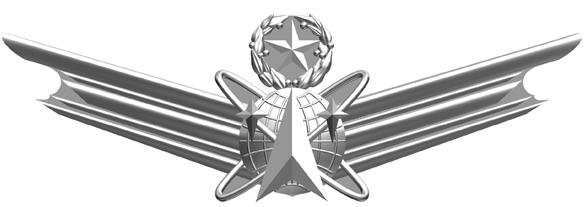
Master Astronaut Observer Badge
Command Space Operations Badge

Meritorious Service Medal
Air Force Commendation Medal with two oak leaf clusters
Air Force Achievement Medal with oak leaf cluster
NASA Distinguished Service Medal with two oak leaf clusters
NASA Space Flight Medal with two oak leaf clusters
National Defense Service Medal with service star
Air Force Training Ribbon

- Distinguished graduate from the United States Air Force ROTC, Squadron Officer School and Test Pilot School Programs
- Recipient of the United States Air Force Test Pilot School Colonel Ray Jones Award as the top Flight Test Engineer/Flight Test Navigator in class 93B
- Recipient of the Sewickley Academy Distinguished Alumni Award in 2005

Preceded by Sergey Volkov	ISS Commander (Expedition 18); October 24, 2008 to April 8, 2009	Succeeded by Gennady Padalka
Preceded by Sergey Ryzhikov	ISS Commander (Expedition 74); December 7, 2025 to January 12, 2026	Succeeded by Sergey Kud-Sverchkov
