= Windows on Earth =

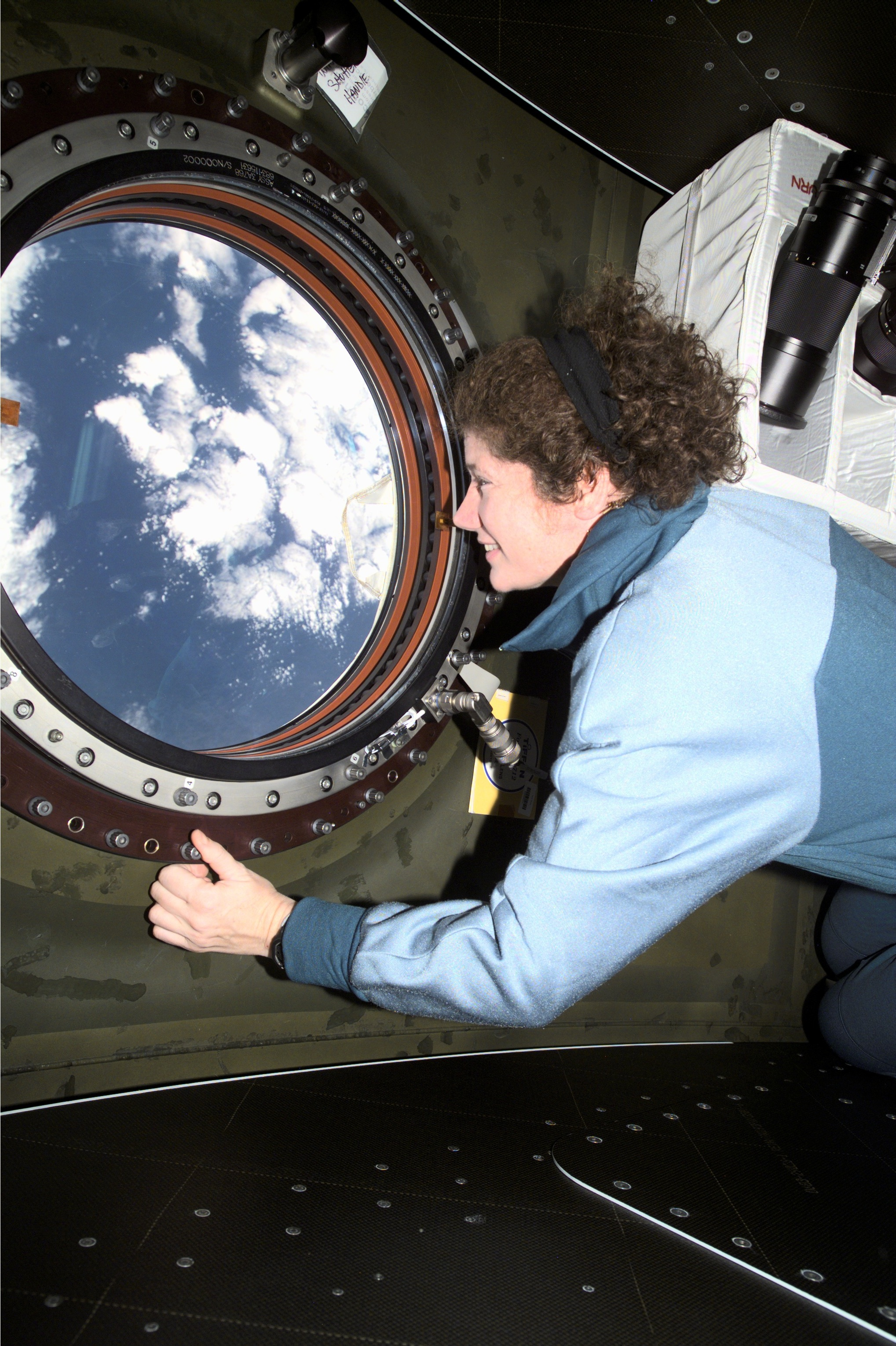
Astronaut, Susan Helms, looking out the window on the International Space Station

Windows on Earth is a museum exhibit, website, and exploration tool, developed by TERC, Inc. (an educational non-profit organization, previously called Technical Education Research Centers), and the Association of Space Explorers, that enables the public to explore an interactive, virtual view of Earth from space. In addition, the tool has been selected by NASA to help astronauts identify targets for photography from the International Space Station (ISS).

The program simulates the view of Earth as seen from a window aboard the ISS, in high-resolution, photographically accurate colors and 3D animations. The views include cloud cover, day and night cycles, night time lights, and other features that help make the exhibit realistic and interactive.

== Earth Visualization Software ==
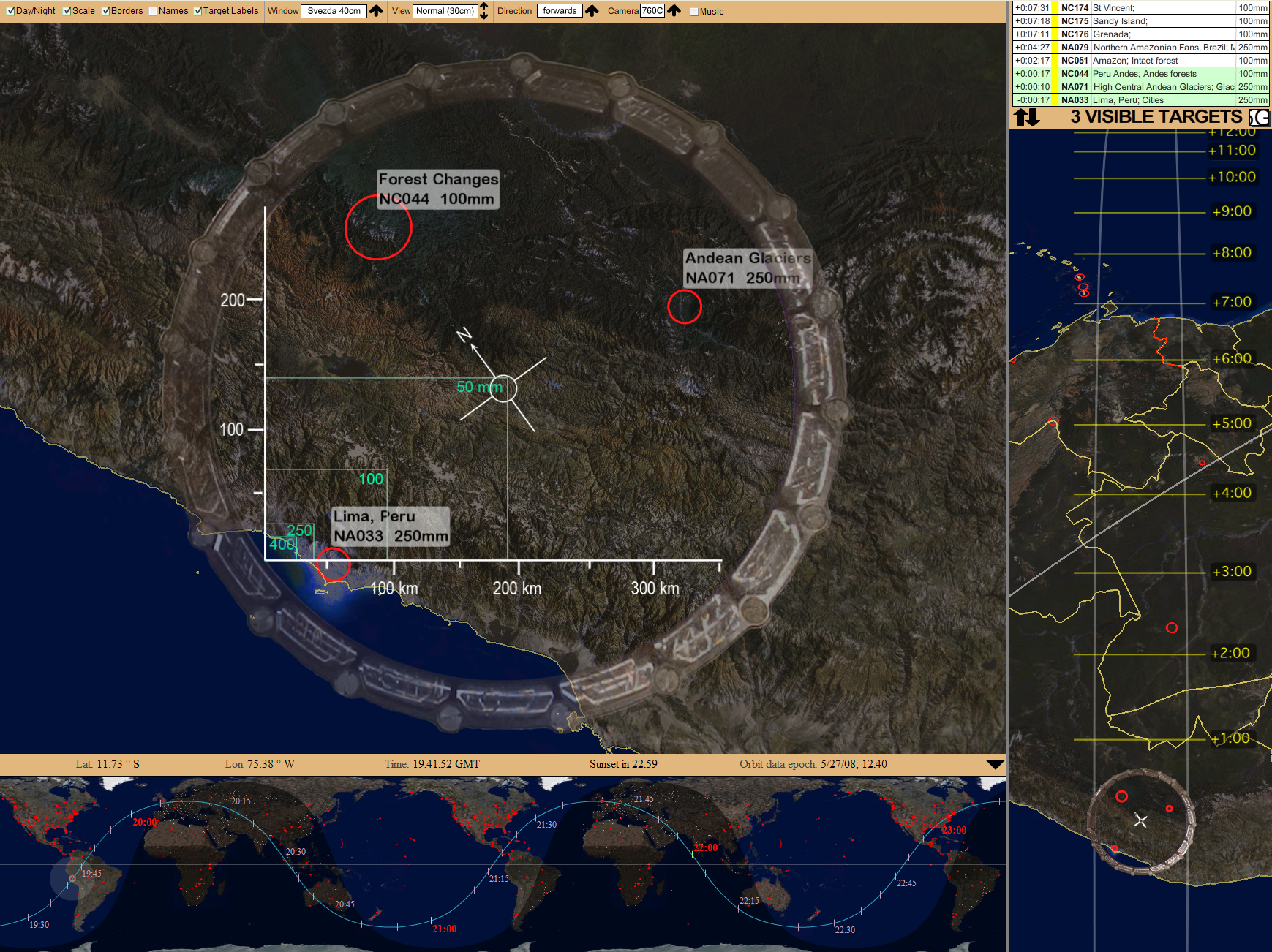
Screen capture from Windows on Earth showing the coast of Peru with three marked targets, orbital track, and the 10-minute look-ahead.

Windows on Earth provides the user a view of Earth from an astronaut's viewpoint, with interactive photorealistic views of Earth as if seen from an altitude of 360 km. The program uses GeoFusion's digital Earth visualization system, which renders accurate views of Earth with terrain, satellite imagery, clouds, and other layers. The system is programmed for user interaction, allowing users to "fly" anywhere they wish to see, and zoom in or out to see details. The system's imagery is derived from Landsat, and features 3D perspective views. Former astronaut Jay Apt assisted with the color-correction of the images, to help get the most realistic colors as seen from space. The program is updated daily to include accurate cloud cover information.

== Development and Outreach Partners ==
Windows on Earth was created by people from the Center for Earth and Space Science Education (CESSE) at TERC, a not-for profit math and science education company located in Cambridge, MA, in partnership with the Association of Space Explorers, GeoFusion's, and WorldSat International and with funding from the National Science Foundation, Informal Science Education.

Additional partners include the Challenger Learning Center and NASA's Johnson Space Center.

== Museums ==
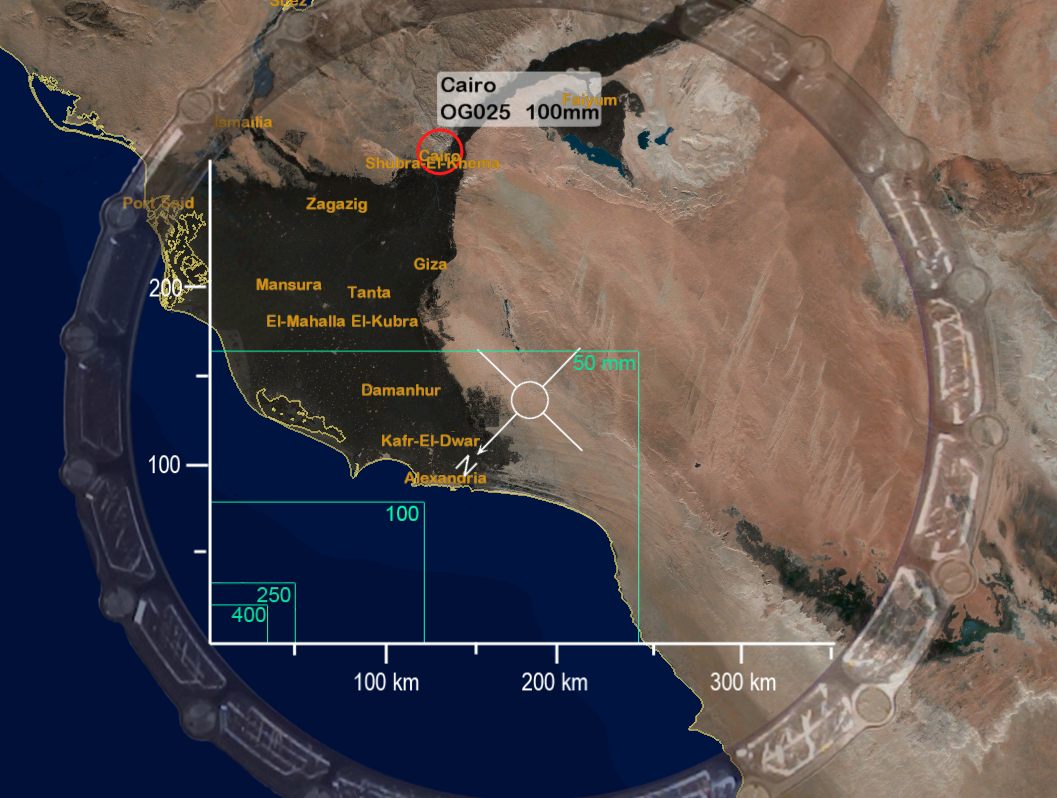
On the International Space Station, Richard Garriott used the Windows on Earth software to identify targets for Earth photography.

The Windows on Earth museum exhibit can be found in the Smithsonian National Air and Space Museum, Boston's Museum of Science, the Montshire Museum of Science in Vermont, the St. Louis Science Center, and the Connecticut Science Center.

== Garriott Mission ==
Windows on Earth flew on board the International Space Station (ISS). On October 12, 2008, Richard Garriott launched aboard Soyuz TMA-13 to the ISS as a Spaceflight participant. Garriott remained on board the station for 10 days, conducting educational and scientific programs and experiments. Earth observation was one of his prime tasks on this mission, and he used the Windows on Earth system to help him take pictures of specific targets.

After the mission, Richard's photographs, along with ones taken by his astronaut father Owen Garriott, who flew on Skylab 3 (1973) and STS-9 (1983), were made available to the public through Windows on Earth. This provides a unique opportunity for comparing areas of Earth photographed by two generations of space explorers, showing how Earth's surface (and the technology of Earth observation) has changed over 35 years, from 1973 to 2008.

== Tool for the ISS ==
In May 2012, NASA selected Windows on Earth as the new tool to help astronauts identify targets for photography from the ISS.

== See also ==
- Google Earth
- NASA World Wind
