= Cayeux =

Cayeux may refer to:

== Places ==
- Cayeux-en-Santerre, a commune in the Somme department in Hauts-de-France in northern France
- Cayeux-sur-Mer, a resort town in the Hauts-de-France, in northern France
- Dorsum Cayeux, a wrinkle ridge in Mare Fecunditatis on the Moon
- Monchy-Cayeux, a commune in the Pas-de-Calais department in the Hauts-de-France in northern France

== People ==
- Cayeux (surname)
