= Expedition 18 =

Long-duration mission to the International Space Station

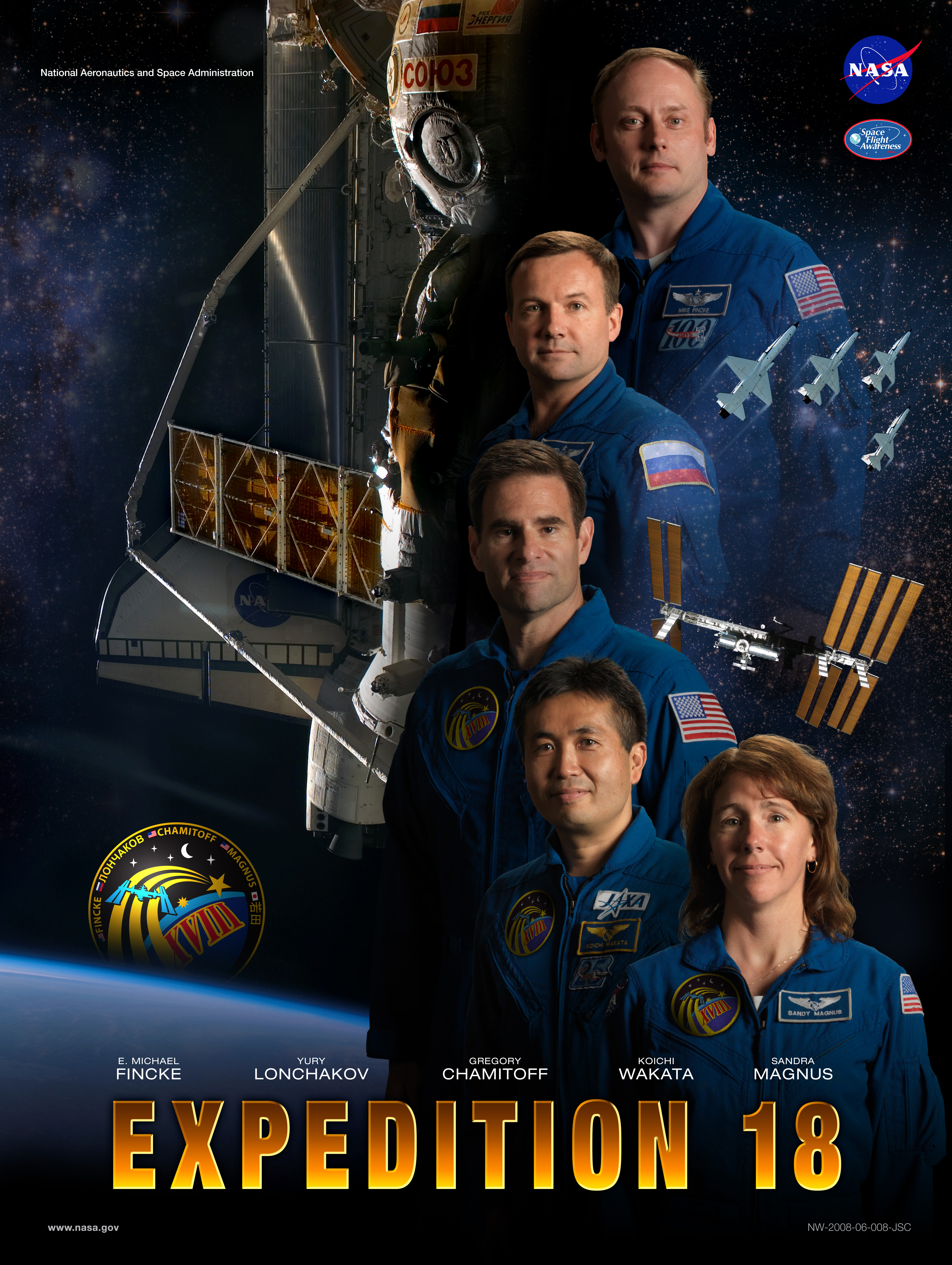
- Promotional poster
- Mission type: Long-duration expedition

Expedition
- Space station: International Space Station
- Began: 12 October 2008
- Ended: 8 April 2009
- Arrived aboard: Soyuz TMA-13; Chamitoff: STS-124; Space Shuttle Discovery; Magnus: STS-126; Space Shuttle Endeavour; Wakata: STS-119; Space Shuttle Discovery
- Departed aboard: Soyuz TMA-13; Chamitoff: STS-126; Space Shuttle Endeavour; Magnus: STS-119; Space Shuttle Discovery; Wakata: STS-127; Space Shuttle Endeavour

Crew
- Crew size: 3
- Members: Michael Fincke; Yuri Lonchakov; Gregory Chamitoff* (October–November); Sandra Magnus (November–March); Koichi Wakata† (March–April) * – transferred from Expedition 17 † – transferred to Expedition 19
- EVAs: 2
- EVA duration: 10 hours, 27 minutes
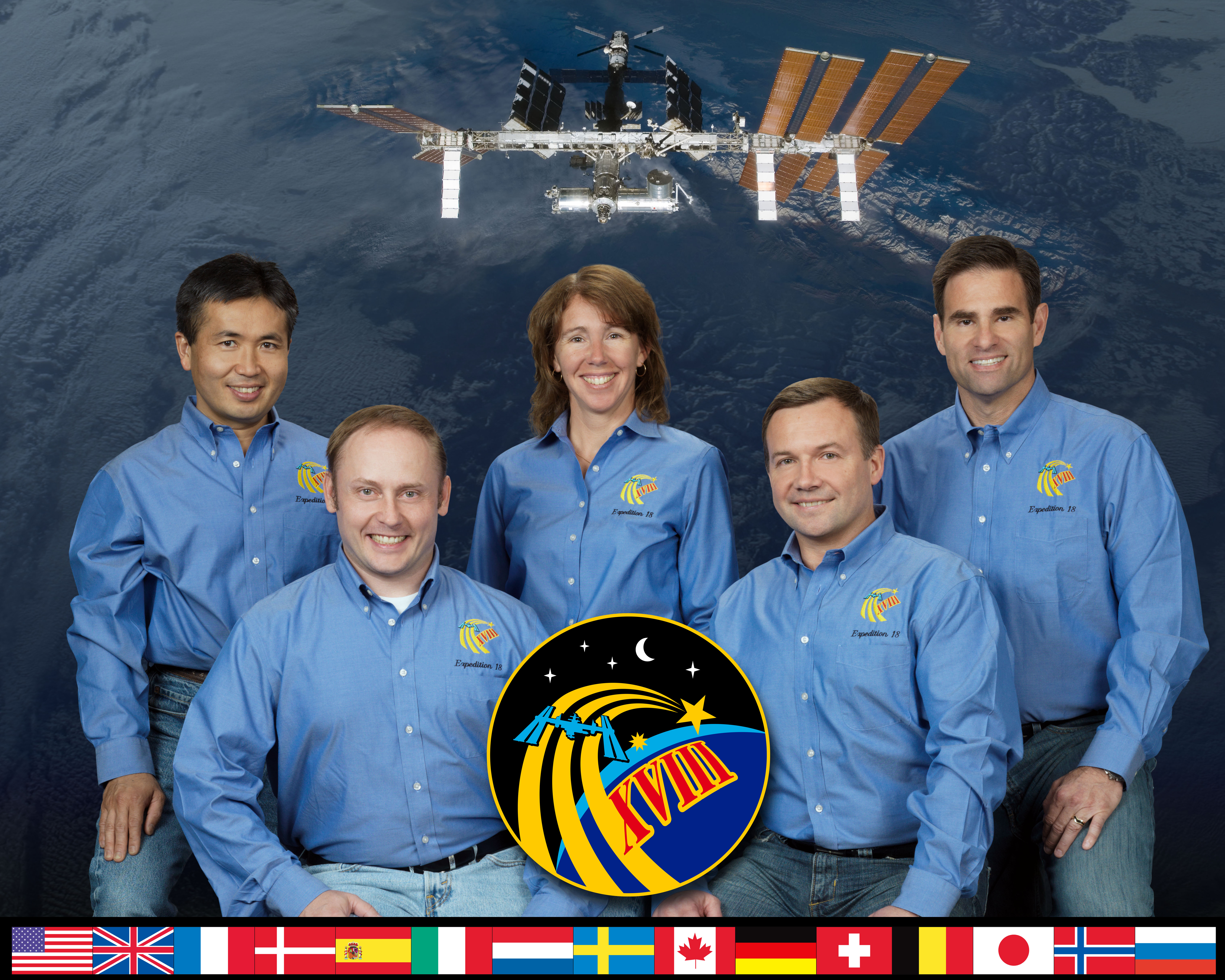
- Expedition 18 mission patch (Left to right) Koichi Wakata, Michael Fincke, Sandra Magnus, Yuri Lonchakov, Gregory Chamitoff ISS expeditions

Expedition 18 was the 18th permanent crew of the International Space Station (ISS). The first two crew members, Michael Fincke, and Yuri Lonchakov were launched on 12 October 2008, aboard Soyuz TMA-13. With them was astronaut Sandra Magnus, who joined the Expedition 18 crew after launching on STS-126 and remained until departing on STS-119 on 25 March 2009. She was replaced by JAXA astronaut Koichi Wakata, who arrived at the ISS on STS-119 on 17 March 2009. Gregory Chamitoff, who joined Expedition 18 after Expedition 17 left the station, ended his stay aboard ISS and returned to Earth with the STS-126 crew.

== Crew ==
Position	First part (October 2008 to November 2008)	Second part (November 2008 to March 2009)	Third part (March 2009 to April 2009)
Commander	Michael Fincke, NASA; Second spaceflight		
Flight Engineer 1	Yuri Lonchakov, RSA; Third and last spaceflight		
Flight Engineer 2	Gregory Chamitoff, NASA; First Spaceflight	Sandra Magnus, NASA; Second spaceflight	Koichi Wakata, JAXA; Third spaceflight

=== Crew notes ===
Salizhan Sharipov was originally slated to be the Soyuz commander and Expedition 18 Flight Engineer 1, but was replaced by his back-up, Yuri Lonchakov.

== Backup crew ==
- Gennady Padalka – Commander – RSA (for Lonchakov)
- Michael Barratt – Flight Engineer – NASA (for Fincke)
- Timothy Kopra – Flight Engineer – NASA (for Chamitoff)
- Nicole Stott – Flight Engineer – NASA (for Magnus)
- Soichi Noguchi – Flight Engineer – JAXA (for Wakata)

== Mission plan ==
- Launch vehicle: Soyuz TMA-13
- Launch date: 12 October 2008 3:01 a.m. EDT
- Docking: 14 October 2008
- Spacewalks: 22 December 2008 (completed 23 December) and 10 March 2009
- Landing: 8 April 2009

== March 2009 debris incident ==
On 12 March 2009, a piece of debris from the upper stage of a Delta II rocket used to launch a GPS satellite in 1993, passed close to the ISS. The conjunction between the debris and the Space Station was not detected until it was too late to perform a collision avoidance manoeuvre. The crew prepared to evacuate the station by closing hatches between modules, and boarding the Soyuz spacecraft that was docked to provide emergency crew escape. The debris did not hit the station, instead it passed by at 16:38 UTC, and the crew were cleared to resume operations about five minutes later.

== Extra-vehicular activity ==
Mission	Spacewalkers	Start (UTC)	End (UTC)	Duration
EVA 1	Yuri Lonchakov; Michael Fincke	23 December 2008; 00:51	23 December 2008; 06:29	5 hours, 38 minutes
EVA 1	Installed an electromagnetic energy measuring device, (Langmuir probe) on Pirs, removed the Russian Biorisk long-duration experiment, installed the Expose-R experiment package on Zvezda, but subsequently removed it after it failed to activate and transmit telemetry on ground command. Installed the Impulse experiment. EVA conducted from Pirs airlock in Russian Orlan space suits.			
EVA 2	Yuri Lonchakov; Michael Fincke	10 March 2009; 16:22	10 March 2009; 21:11	4 hours, 49 minutes
EVA 2	Installed the EXPOSE-R onto the universal science platform of the Zvezda module, removed tape straps from the area of the docking target on the Pirs airlock and docking compartment, inspected and photographed the exterior of the Russian portion of the station. EVA conducted from Pirs airlock in Russian Orlan space suits.			

== See also ==
- Apogee of Fear, a film made aboard the flight
- Extravehicular activity
- List of cumulative spacewalk records
- List of spacewalks 2000–2014
