= Apogee of Fear =

2012 science fiction film made completely in space

- Directed by: Richard Garriott
- Written by: Tracy Hickman
- Produced by: Tracy Hickman
- Starring: Yuri Lonchakov; Michael Fincke; Greg Chamitoff; Richard Garriott
- Cinematography: Richard Garriott
- Edited by: Tracy Hickman
- Music by: Digital Juice (original version)
- Release date: February 2012 (SXSW)
- Running time: 8 minutes
- Country: United States
- Language: English

Apogee of Fear
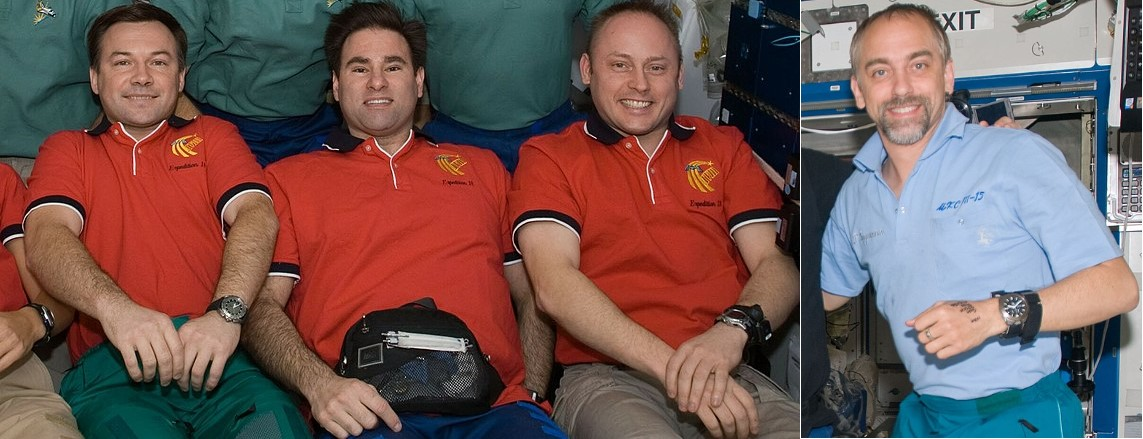
- Astronauts from Soyuz TMA-13 and STS-124 that were the cast launched to ISS for the film
- Space career

A Film Shot On Space Station
- Time in space: 11d 20h 35m (~8 minutes of production)
- Missions: Soyuz TMA-13/TMA-12/STS-124 (Expedition 17) (Equipment on Soyuz TMA-13 and returned on Soyuz TMA-12)
- Mission insignia

Apogee of Fear is a 2012 science fiction comedy short film, the first narrative fiction film made completely in space. (Contrast Return from Orbit, 1984 film made partially in space.) Filmed by Richard Garriott from a script and production elements he contracted from fantasy novelist Tracy Hickman, the film's principal photography was accomplished during Garriott's time aboard the International Space Station as a spaceflight participant in October 2008.

== Plot ==
The film starts with a faux preview for The Magnificent Five Plus One, which promotes the Space Station crew as the stars. Richard Garriott is billed as 'The Gunfight Participant' – a satirical nod to his official status as a 'Spaceflight Participant.'

A series of motion graphics under the credits leads us to a Soyuz spacecraft departing the International Space Station, bearing Garriott, Volkov, and Kononenko back to Earth. Fincke and Chamitoff wave goodbye but express their relief at Garriott's leaving as he was annoying them with his constant talk of computer games. Lonchakov insists that they all go back to work.

One week later, Chamitoff and Fincke are both missing Garriott. Chamitoff can no longer juggle without Garriott, and Fincke knows Garriott was good at settling arguments about which of them was standing upside down. At this point Lonchakov points out that the oxygen use aboard the station is too high. The crew theorizes that interstellar aliens have invaded the station. A search of ridiculous locations on the station ensues, during which the surprising nature of the alien is discovered.

The completed film is just over eight minutes in length. It includes numerous references to classic science-fiction movies, including The Day the Earth Stood Still, Forbidden Planet, and Galaxy Quest.

== Cast ==
- Yuri Lonchakov as himself
- Michael Fincke as himself
- Gregory Chamitoff as himself
- Richard Garriott as "The Spaceflight Participant"
- Helen Garriott as "The Spaceflight Participant's Mother"

== Pre-production ==
Under contract with Garriott, Hickman quietly began development and pre-production under the cover title of Project Icarus. Once Garriott approved the script, the 'false preview' and 'opening credits' elements of the movie were produced prior to the flight and preloaded onto Garriott's flight camera. The opening credits were laid over graphics created by professional motion graphics artist Curtis Hickman, Tracy Hickman's son. Background video elements for the 'preview' were shot by Hickman at various locations outside St. George, Utah. Green screen elements of Richard's mother Helen Garriott were filmed in her home in Las Vegas.

Project Icarus had some very stringent requirements: The film could not impact the crew's work schedule, could not significantly add to the payload weight and volume restrictions, and had to be a fully executed and complete story. In addition to the video elements, Hickman produced a PowerPoint presentation file containing the shooting directions and cue cards (both in English and Russian) which could be displayed on a laptop aboard the ISS for the crew during filming.

== Production ==
Garriott, as a private space explorer, flew into Earth orbit aboard Soyuz TMA-13 on October 12, 2008, docked on the 14th, and returned on October 24 after 10 days aboard the ISS. He carried with him items under codename Icarus.

The original script was written for the equal participation of all six people aboard. When Garriott presented the idea to the cosmonauts and astronauts aboard, all were enthusiastic about the project. Ultimately Volkov and Kononenko declined to participate for personal reasons, although they still supported the project. This required Garriott to restructure the shooting of the script and the script itself while on orbit.

Scenes were filmed in sequence during the crew's personal time so as not to impact their work schedule in any way. The scenes were filmed over several days and thereby only took a few minutes to set up and shoot sequences on any given day.

Garriott described film shooting in microgravity as difficult, despite his meticulous planning. Props drifted and ventilation fans generated background noise. Being new to space, Garriott found himself banging into walls and dislodging miscellaneous items from their velcro-fixed locations on the station walls. He described life in space as requiring deliberate, careful movement, unsuited to blockbuster action scenes.

== Post-production ==
Upon Garriott's return to his quarters in Star City, Russia immediately after his flight, he uploaded the HD video source files from his camera to a secure internet server, allowing Hickman to download them almost immediately to his office in South Jordan, Utah. Rough cuts of the film were completed within a week. The original film was produced in 16:9 widescreen format at 1080i HD resolution. This was subsequently rendered down to anamorphic widescreen NTSC standard.

== Release ==
Garriott originally intended the film for release alongside documentary Man on a Mission, which follows Garriott's journey to space and was released on 13 January 2012, but NASA initially refused permission, citing that the filming of Apogee of Fear had been "not part of his original Space Act agreement with NASA". Garriott speculated that NASA opposed the film due to it being too playful for their branding.

With some redactions and statements made at the behest of NASA, Apogee of Fear was eventually released. The film is available as a special feature on the DVD Man on a Mission. The DVD is available from First Run Features.
