= Explore/Create =

2017 memoir by Richard Garriott

- Author: Richard Garriott, David Fisher
- Publication date: January 10, 2017

Explore/Create: My Life in Pursuit of New Frontiers, Hidden Worlds, and the Creative Spark is a memoir about Richard Garriott's life, which he wrote with the help of David Fisher.

On the cover Elon Musk is quoted calling it "A chronicle of wonder".

The book also received praise from Stephen Hawking, and Steve Wozniak

The book covers Garriott's various explorations, his journey into space, and his career of video game making, and his haunted house.

Agent Jeff Silberman was in the audience of a live story telling event known as The Moth, while Garriott told a story of one of his adventures, and later convinced him to write a book.

== Reception ==
- Steve Wozniak called it a "compelling story".
- Kirkus Reviews stated that its "Not so much a conventional memoir as a series of anecdotes. While its insights are limited, those looking for glimpses into an adventurous life should be pleased."
- A Forbes reviewer called it " a fascinating read."
