= Lucien Cayeux =

- Born: 26 March 1864; France
- Died: 1 November 1944 (aged 80)
- Known for: Pioneering petrography of sedimentary rocks
- Awards: Member, French Academy of Sciences
- Scientific career
- Fields: Geology
- Institutions: Collège de France

Lucien Cayeux (26 March 1864–1 November 1944) was a French sedimentary petrographer.

In 1902, he joined the l'Ecole des Mines and become a professor of geology. In 1912, he was named as professor of geology at the Collège de France. He was admitted to the Académie des Sciences in 1928.

He is noted for his study of sediments with the polarizing microscope, and was one of the pioneers in this field.

The wrinkle ridge Dorsum Cayeux on the moon is named after him.

== Bibliography ==
- "Études des Gites Minéraux de la France", 1906.
- "Les Minerais de Fer Oolithiques de France", 1909.
- "Introduction à l'étude Pétrographique des Roches Sédimentaires", 1916.
- "Les Roches Sédimentaires de France", 1929.
- "Les Phosphates de Chaux Sédimentaire de France", 1941.
- "Causes Anciennes et Causes Actuelles en Géologie", 1941.

He also published a number of scientific papers.
