= Dorsum Cayeux =

Wrinkle ridge on the Moon

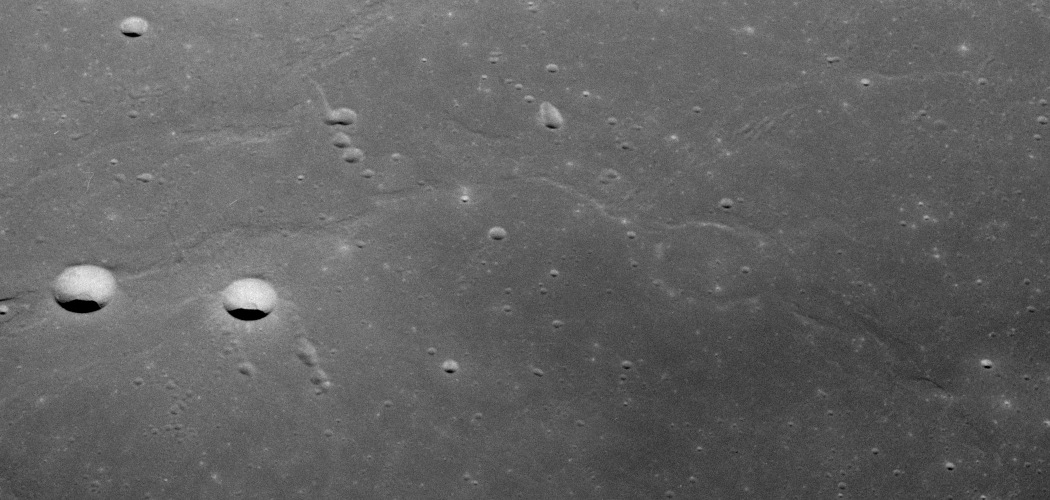
Oblique view from Apollo 11, with Taruntius P and K in lower left

Dorsum Cayeux is a wrinkle ridge at 1.6°N 51.2°E in Mare Fecunditatis on the Moon. It is approximately 95 km long and was named after French geologist Lucien Cayeux in 1976 by the IAU.

Dorsum Cayeux begins on the north side of Taruntius P crater and trends to the northwest past Taruntius K crater, and then it curves back to the northeast and flattens out into the mare surface northwest of Smithson crater. The ridge is probably a continuation of Dorsa Geikie, which ends on the south side of Taruntius P crater (i.e., the object that created Taruntius P impacted the ridge).
