= Richard Garriott =

American video game developer, entrepreneur and space tourist (born 1961)

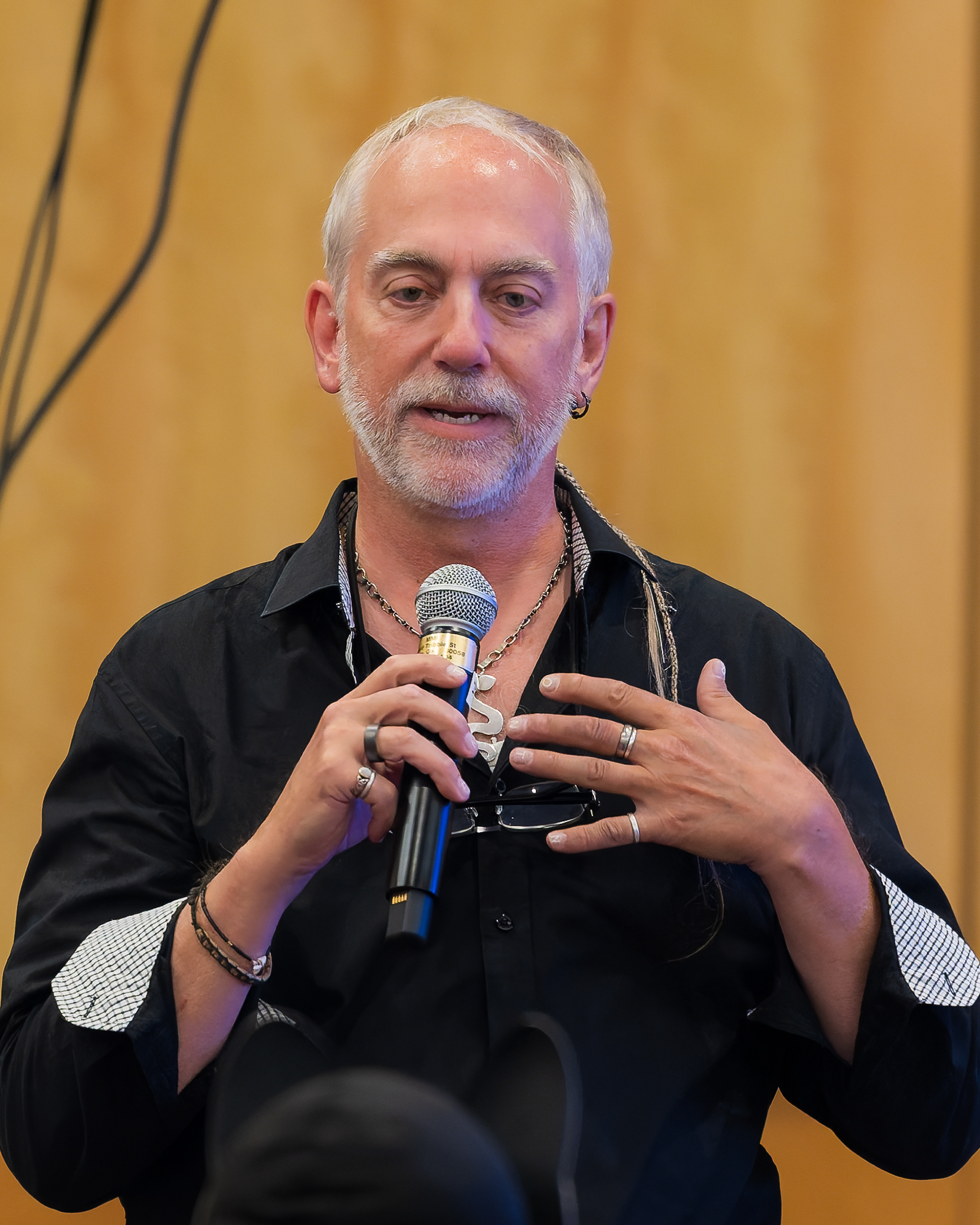
- Garriott at Dragon Con in 2026
- Born: Richard Allen Garriott; 4 July 1961 (age 65); Cambridge, England
- Citizenship: American, British
- Occupation: Video game developer
- Known for: Ultima series; Origin Systems; space
- Spouse: Laetitia Pichot de Cayeux (m. 2011)
- Children: 2
- Parents: Owen K. Garriott; Helen Garriott
- Relatives: Robert Garriott (brother)
- Awards: AIAS Hall of Fame Award (2006)
- Space career

Space Adventures private astronaut / cast of a film in a space station
- Time in space: 11d 20h 35m
- Mission: Soyuz TMA-13/TMA-12

Richard Allen Garriott de Cayeux (né Garriott; born 4 July 1961) is a British-born American video game developer, entrepreneur and space tourist.

Garriott, who is the son of NASA astronaut Owen Garriott, was originally a game designer and programmer, and is now involved in a number of aspects of computer-game development. On October 12, 2008, Garriott flew aboard the Soyuz TMA-13 mission to the International Space Station as a private astronaut, returning 12 days later aboard Soyuz TMA-12. He became the second space traveler, and first from the United States, to have a parent who was also a space traveler. During his ISS flight, he filmed a science fiction movie Apogee of Fear.

The creator of the Ultima game series, Garriott was involved in all games in the series, and directly supervised all eleven main installments, starting with 1979's Akalabeth: World of Doom and concluding with 1999's Ultima IX: Ascension. Within the context of Ultima, Garriott presented himself as the fictional persona of Lord British. The series is considered influential, notably helping with establishing the computer role-playing game genre. He founded the video game development company Portalarium in 2009. He was CEO of Portalarium and creative director of Shroud of the Avatar: Forsaken Virtues until 2018 when he shed the title, later relinquishing all Shroud of the Avatar assets to Catnip Games in 2019.

== Early life ==
Richard Allen Garriott was born in Cambridge, England, on 4 July 1961, to Helen Mary (née Walker) Garriott (1930–2017) and Owen Garriott, one of NASA's first scientist-astronauts (selected in NASA Astronaut Group 4), who flew on Skylab 3 and Space Shuttle mission STS-9. His parents had been high school sweethearts growing up in Enid, Oklahoma. Although both his parents were Americans, Garriott claims dual citizenship for both the United States and the United Kingdom by birth.

Garriott was raised in Nassau Bay, Texas from the age of about two months. Since his childhood, he had dreamed of becoming a NASA astronaut like his father. Eyesight problems discovered at the age of 13 blocked his ambition, however, so he instead came to focus on computer game development.

Garriott's "first real exposure to computers" occurred in 1975, during his freshman year at Clear Creek High School. In search of more experience than the single one-semester BASIC class the school offered, and as a fan of The Lord of the Rings and Dungeons & Dragons, Garriott convinced the school to let him create a self-directed course in programming. He used the course to create fantasy computer games on the school's teletype machine. Garriott later estimated that he wrote 28 computer fantasy games during high school.

One of Garriott's game pseudonyms is "British", a name he still uses for various gaming characters, including Ultima character Lord British and Tabula Rasa character General British. The name was given to him by his first Dungeons and Dragons friends because he was born in the UK.

== Game design career ==
=== Early days ===
Garriott began writing computer games in 1974. His first games were created on teletype terminals. The code was stored on paper tape spools, and the game was displayed as an ongoing print-out. In summer 1979, Garriott worked at a ComputerLand store where he first encountered Apple computers. Inspired by their video monitors with color graphics, he began to add perspective view to his own games. After he created Akalabeth for fun, the owner of the store convinced Garriott it might sell. Garriott spent $200 printing copies of a manual and cover sheet that his mother had drawn, then put copies of the game in Ziploc bags, a common way to sell software at the time. Although Garriott sold fewer than a dozen copies at the store, one copy made it to California Pacific Computer Company, which signed a deal with him. The game sold over 30,000 copies, and Garriott received five dollars for each copy sold. The US$150,000 (equivalent to $665,000 in 2025) he earned was three times his father's astronaut salary. Akalabeth is considered the first published computer role playing game.

Later that year, Garriott entered the University of Texas at Austin (UT). He joined the school's fencing team, and later, the Society for Creative Anachronism. He lived at home with his parents while attending university, and from there created Ultima I with his friend Ken Arnold. Its cover, and those of several subsequently Garriott games, were painted by Denis Loubet, whose art Garriott discovered during a visit to Steve Jackson Games.

=== Origin Systems ===
Garriott continued to develop the Ultima series of video games in the early 1980s, eventually leaving UT to work on them full time. Originally programmed for the Apple II, the Ultima series later became available on several platforms. Ultima II was published by Sierra On-Line, as they were the only company that would agree to publish it in a box together with a printed cloth map. By the time he developed Ultima III, Garriott, together with his brother Robert, their father Owen and Chuck Bueche established their own video game publisher, Origin Systems, to handle publishing and distribution, in part due to controversy with Sierra over royalties for the PC port of Ultima II.

The use of the term avatar for the on-screen representation of the user was coined in 1985 by Richard Garriott for the computer game Ultima IV: Quest of the Avatar. In this game, Garriott desired the player's character to be their Earth self manifested into the virtual world. Due to the ethical content of his story, Garriott wanted the real player to be responsible for their character; he thought only someone playing "themselves" could be properly judged based on their in-game actions. Because of its ethically nuanced narrative approach, he took the Hindu word associated with a deity's manifestation on earth in physical form, and applied it to a player in the game world.

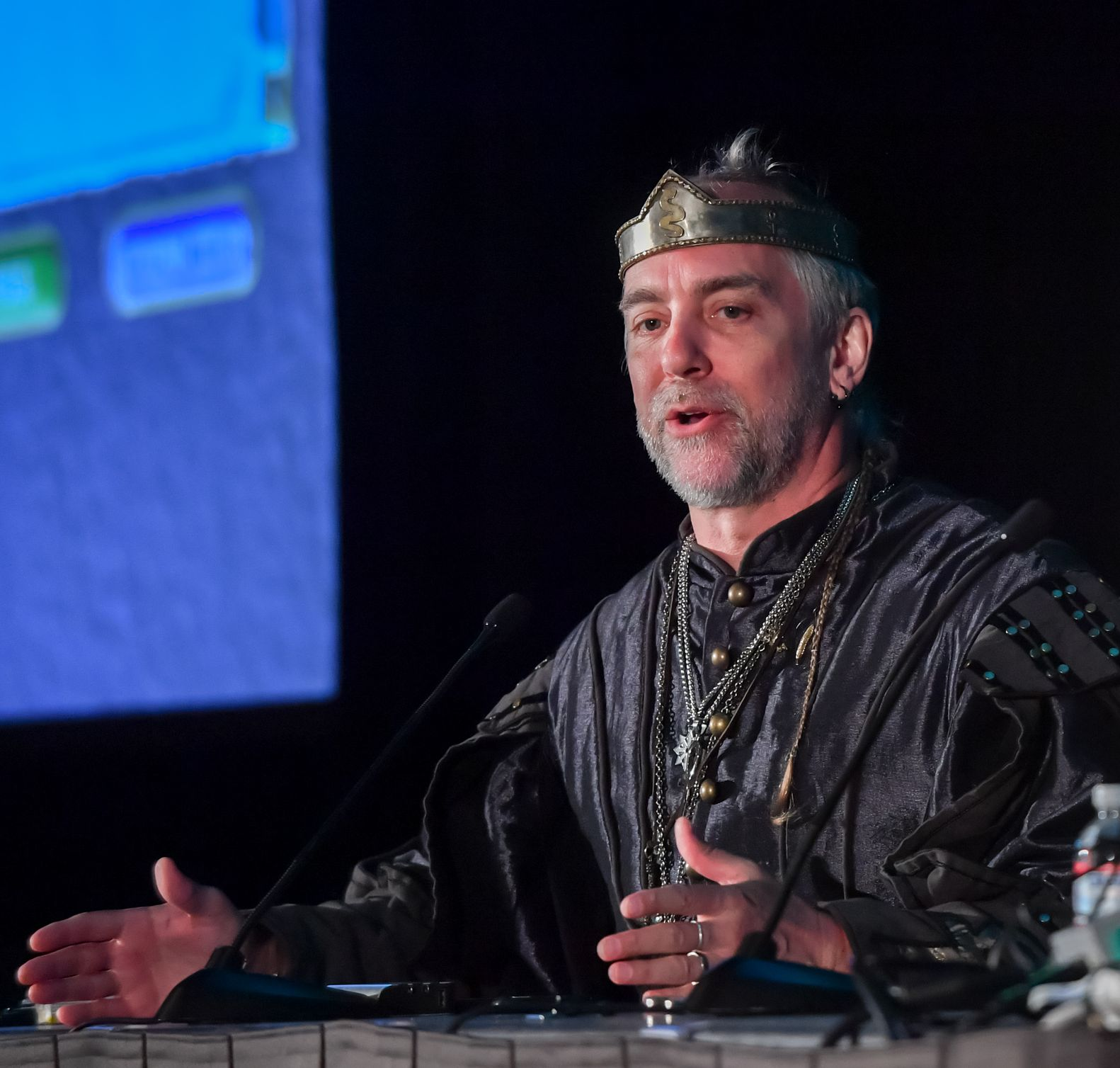
Garriott, dressed as his "Lord British" persona, at the 2018 Game Developers Conference

Garriott sold Origin Systems to Electronic Arts (EA) in September 1992 for $30 million. In 1997, he coined the term massively multiplayer online role-playing game (MMORPG), giving a new identity to the nascent genre previously known as graphical MUDs. In 1999 and 2000, EA canceled all of Origin's new development projects, including Privateer Online, and Harry Potter Online. Garriott resigned from the company and formed Destination Games in April 2000 with his brother and Starr Long (the producer of Ultima Online).

=== NCSoft ===
Once Garriott's non-compete agreement with EA expired a year later, Destination partnered with NCSoft where Garriott acted as a producer and designer of MMORPGs. After that, he became the CEO of NCSoft Austin, also known as NC Interactive.

Tabula Rasa failed to generate much money during its initial release, despite its seven-year development period. On November 24, 2008, NCSoft announced that it planned to end the live service of Tabula Rasa. The servers shut down on February 28, 2009, after a period of free play from January 10 onward for existing account holders.

NCSoft fired Garriot in November 2008, but publicly claimed that he left the company voluntarily, resulting in a lawsuit against them. In July 2010, an Austin District Court awarded Garriott US$28 million in his lawsuit against NCSoft, finding that the company did not appropriately handle his departure in 2008. In October 2011, the United States Court of Appeals for the Fifth Circuit affirmed the judgment.

=== Portalarium ===
Garriott founded the company Portalarium in 2009, which developed Shroud of the Avatar: Forsaken Virtues, a spiritual successor to the Ultima series. Garriott remarked that had they been able to secure the intellectual property rights to Ultima from EA, the game could have become Ultima Online 2. On March 8, 2013, Portalarium launched a Kickstarter campaign for Shroud of the Avatar: Forsaken Virtues. An early access version of the game was released on Steam in 2014, and the game was fully released in March 2018. The game received "mixed or average" reviews from critics. In October 2019, the assets and rights to Shroud of the Avatar were sold to Catnip Games, a company owned by Portalarium CEO Chris Spears. Garriott is no longer associated with either company.

=== Current ===
In April 2022 he announced he had begun working on a new fantasy MMO that uses NFT technology with long-time contributor Todd Porter. In August 2022, the game was announced as Iron and Magic. However, in May 2023, it was reported that the game's official website has vanished and its Facebook page has lain dormant since September 2022, leading to many speculations regarding the status of the game.

== Private astronaut ==
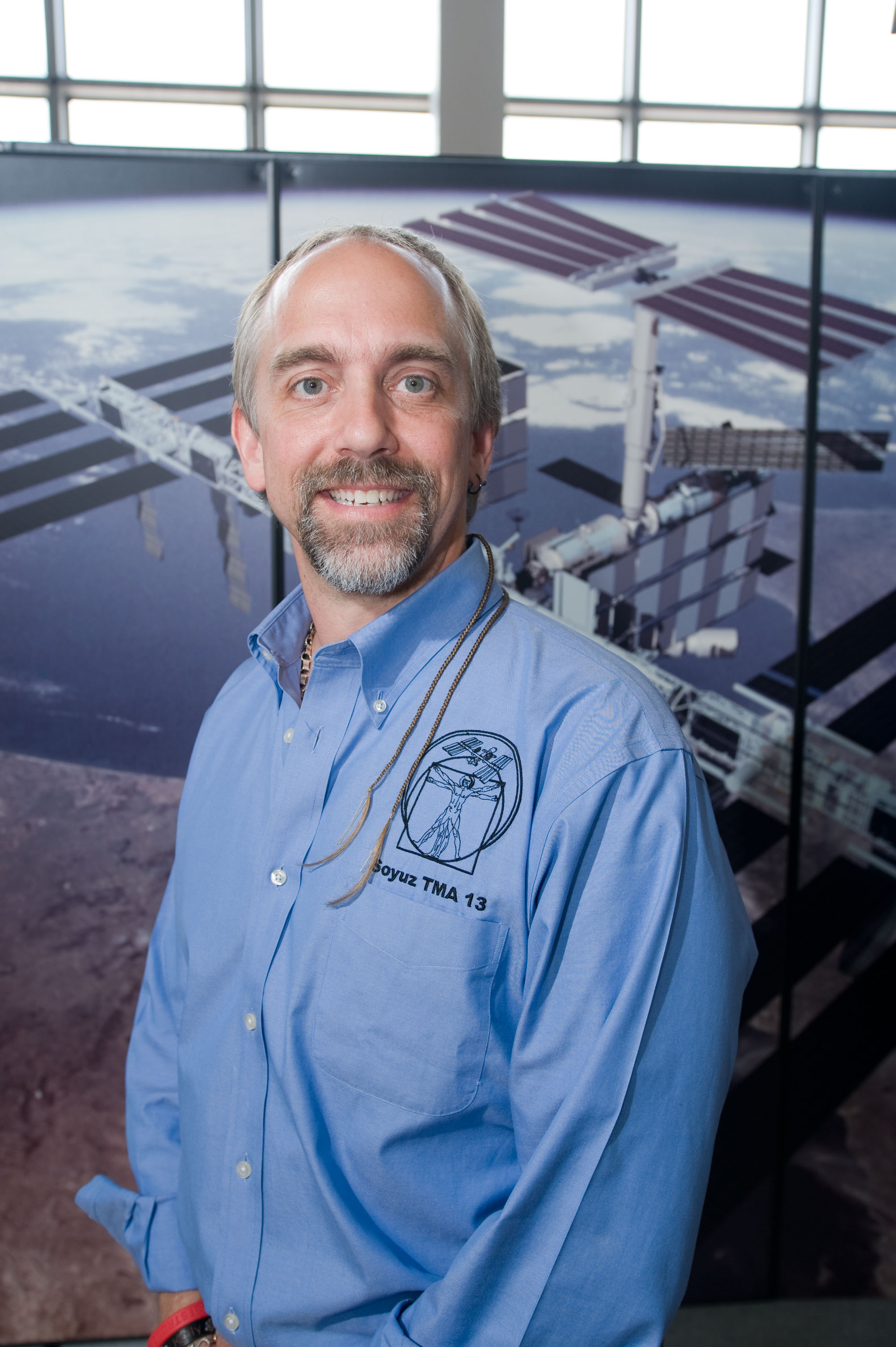
Garriott poses for a portrait following an Expedition 18 /Soyuz 17 pre-flight press conference at NASA 's Johnson Space Center

In 1983, Softline reported that "Garriott wants to go into space but doesn't see it happening in the predictable future ... He has frequently joked with his father about stowing away on a spaceship, and recently his speculations have been sounding uncomfortably realistic". The income from the success of Garriott's video game career allowed him to pursue his interest in spaceflight. After the sale of Origin Systems, he invested in Space Adventures and purchased a ticket to become the first private citizen to fly into space. Due to financial setbacks in 2001 after the dot-com bubble burst, however, he was forced to sell his seat to Dennis Tito.

Garriott then returned to creating games; once he had accumulated sufficient funds, he put down another non-refundable deposit. During his mandatory medical examination a hemangioma was discovered on his liver, which could cause potentially fatal internal bleeding in the event of a rapid spacecraft depressurization. Given the choice of forfeiting his deposit or undergoing surgical removal of the angioma, he decided to have the surgery.

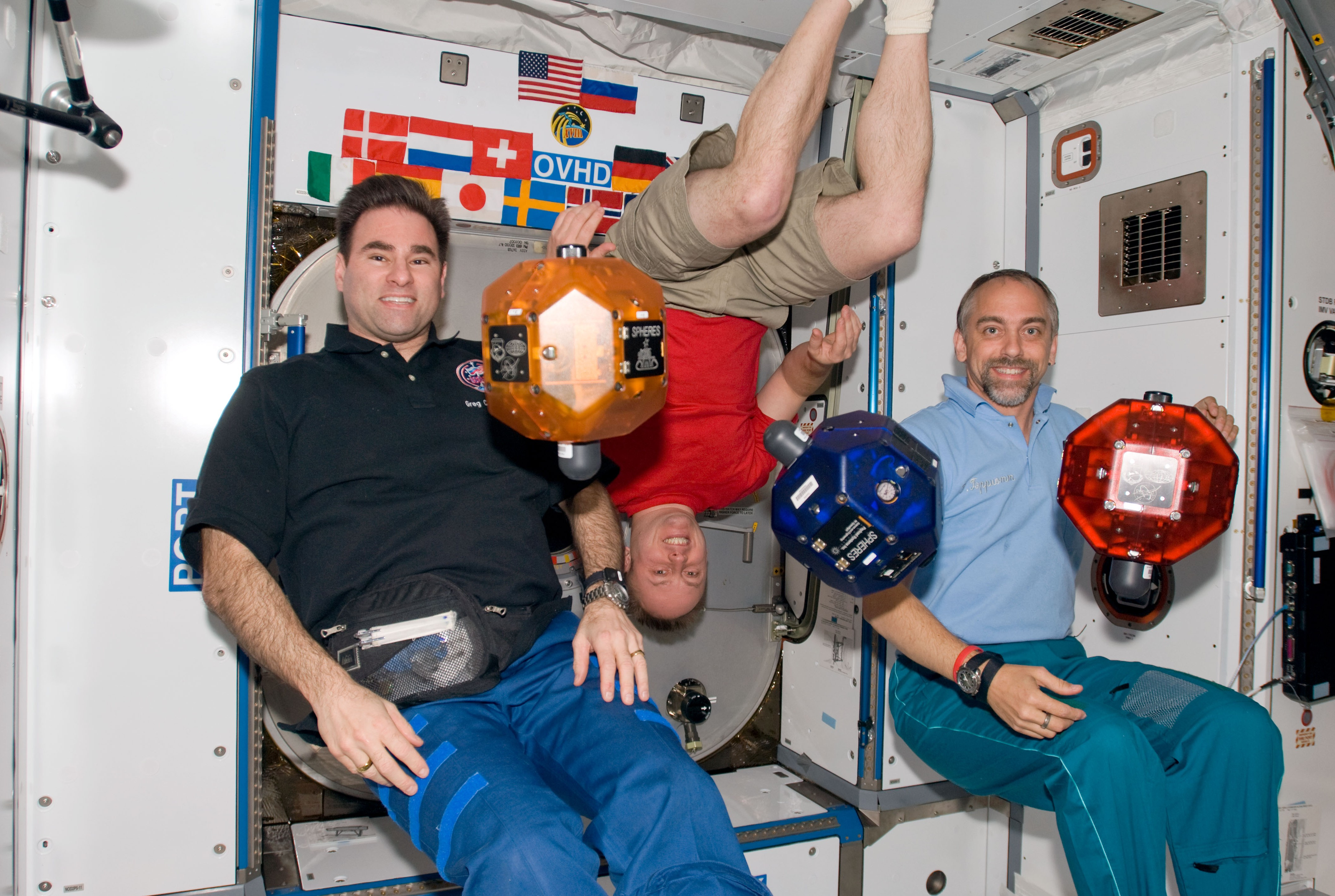
Richard Garriott (far right) aboard the ISS on October 23, 2008, with the MIT SPHERES Satellites.

On September 28, 2007, Space Adventures announced that Garriott would fly to the International Space Station in October 2008 as a self-funded Private Astronaut at a reported cost of $30 million. On October 12, 2008, after a year of training in Russia, Garriott became the second second-generation space traveler (after Sergei Volkov), the first offspring of an American astronaut to go into space, and the second person to wear the British Union Flag in space. His father, Owen Garriott, was at the Baikonur Cosmodrome in Kazakhstan for the launch, and was in attendance when he landed safely twelve days later, along with Russian cosmonauts Sergei Volkov and Oleg Kononenko.

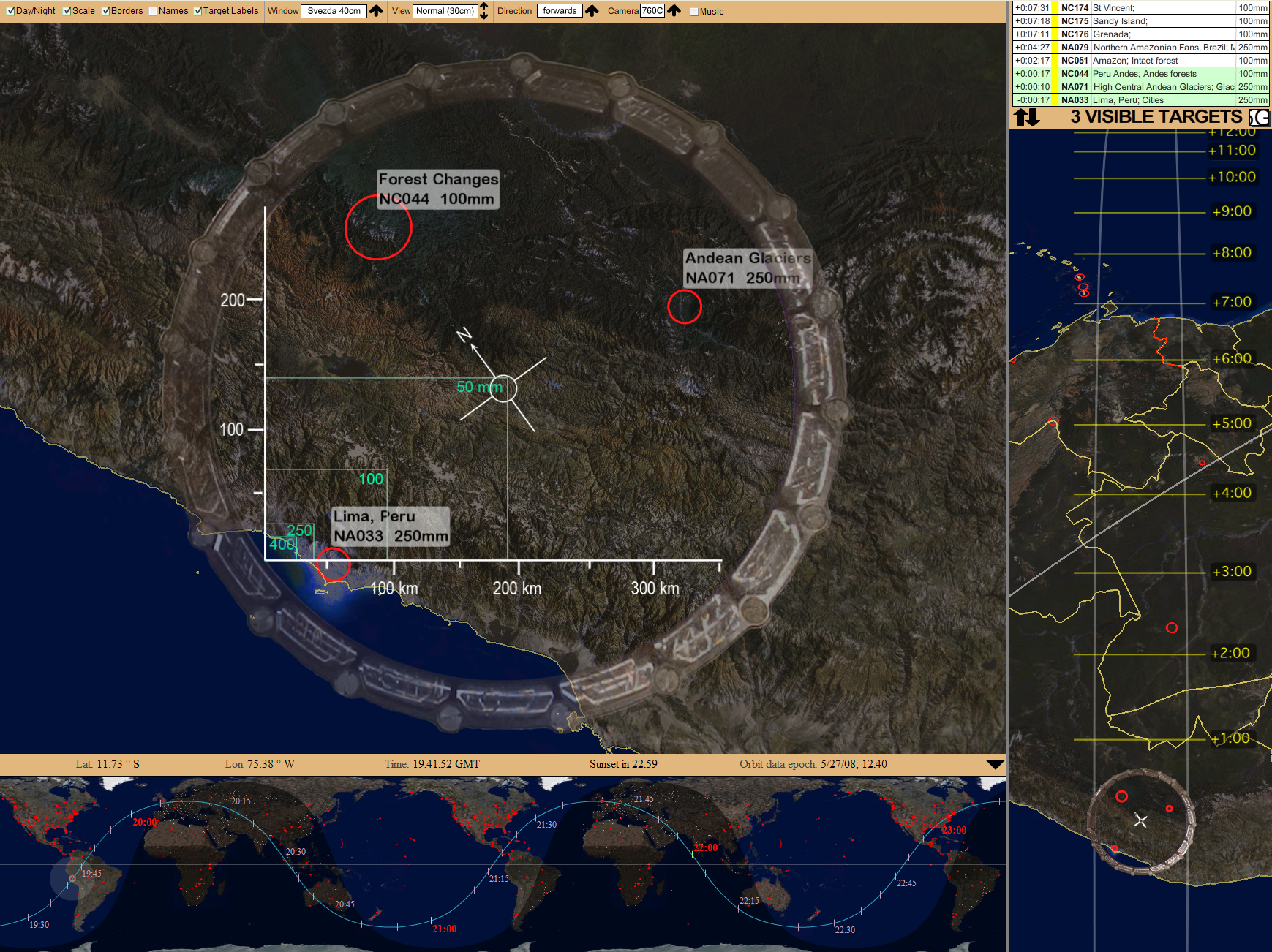
Screen capture from Windows on Earth, used by Garriott on ISS to identify targets for Earth photography (Coast of Peru).

During his spaceflight, Garriott took part in several education outreach efforts. The free Metro newspaper in London provided him with a special edition containing details of British primary school students' space experiment concepts that Garriott took to the ISS. The Metro has claimed, as a result, that it was the first newspaper in space. He communicated with students and other Amateur Radio operators and transmitted photographs using the Amateur Radio on the International Space Station (ARISS) slow-scan television system, and placed a geocache while aboard the ISS.

Garriott worked with the Windows on Earth project, which provides an interactive, virtual view of Earth as seen from the ISS. Garriott used Windows on Earth software to assist in the selection of locations on Earth to photograph, and the public were able to use the same online tool to track the ISS and see the view Garriott was experiencing. Garriott's photographs, along with images taken by his astronaut father Owen Garriott in 1973, will be available to the public through Windows on Earth, adding a personal element to studies of Earth and how Earth has changed over time.

Garriott covertly smuggled a portion of the ashes of Star Trek actor James Doohan on a laminated card, which he placed under the floor cladding of the ISS's Columbus module. This action was kept secret until Christmas Day 2020 when Doohan's son made the fact public on his Twitter account. At the time of the reveal, Doohan's ashes had orbited the Earth more than 70,000 times and traveled more than 1.7 billion miles. Garriott also performed magic tricks aboard the ISS.

Garriott's film Apogee of Fear was the first ever fictional (short) film fully filmed in space (whereas Return from Orbit was only partially filmed in space). Tracy Hickman wrote the screenplay.

In 2010 he was featured in a documentary, Man on a Mission: Richard Garriott's Road to the Stars, which covered his spaceflight training and mission into orbit.

== Other exploration ==
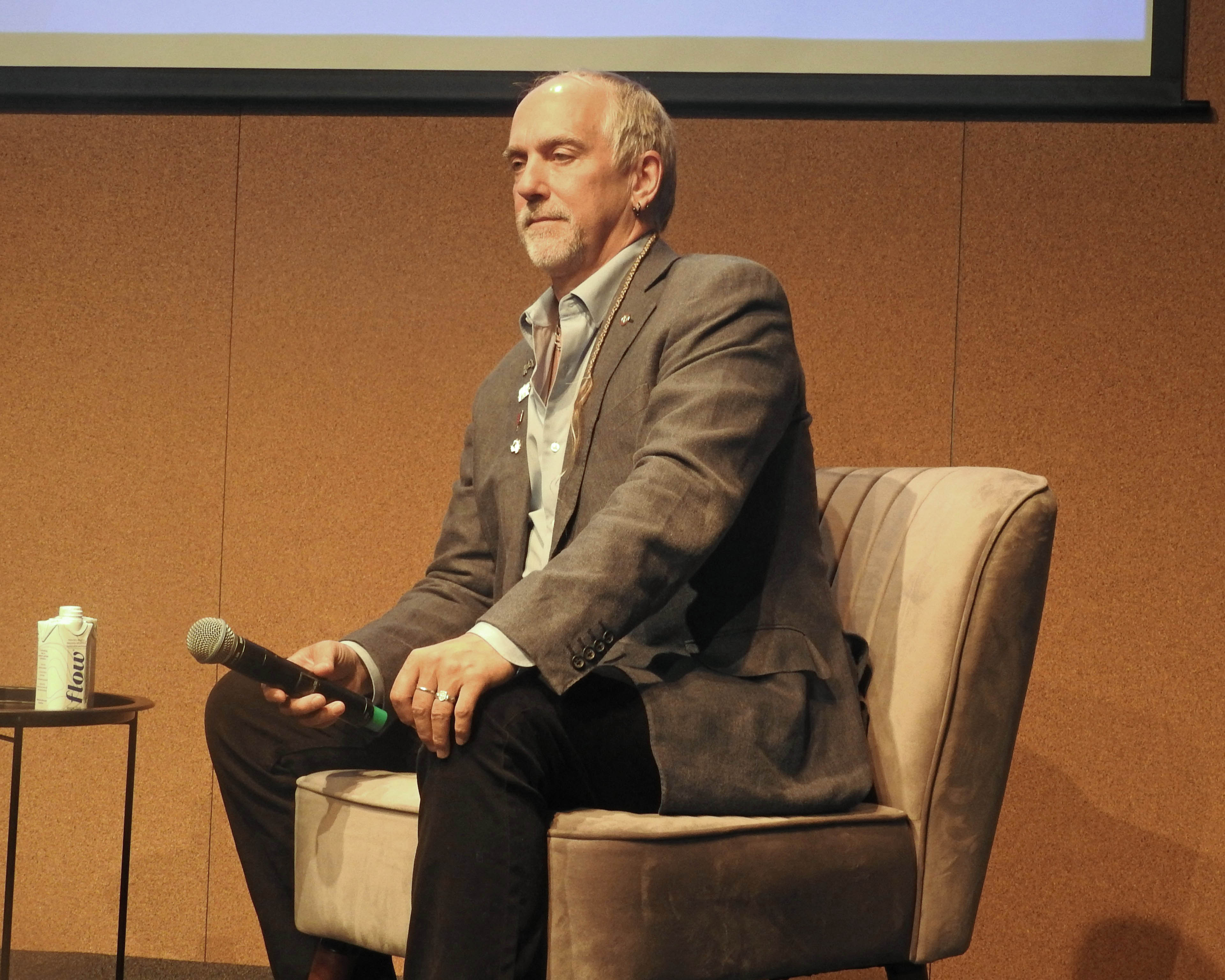
2022 in Manhattan

In January 2021, Garriott was elected president of The Explorers Club.

In February 2021, Garriott traveled to the bottom of the Mariana Trench, the deepest oceanic trench on the planet. While there, as well as performing scientific duties, he placed a geocache and recorded another short sci-fi film. This made him the holder of both altitude and depth records for these activities.

== Other accomplishments and interests ==
In 1986, Garriott helped start the Challenger Center for Space Science Education with his high school science teacher, June Scobee Rodgers, widow of Challenger Shuttle Commander Dick Scobee, who piloted the ill-fated STS-51-L mission. Scobee Rodgers drew on Garriott's early leadership in gaming to help design what have become approximately 50 global interactive networked facilities, where students perform simulated space missions.

Garriott bought the Luna 21 lander and the Lunokhod 2 rover (both currently on the lunar surface) from the Lavochkin Association for $68,500 in December 1993 at a Sotheby's auction in New York. (The catalog incorrectly lists lot 68A as Luna 17/Lunokhod 1.) Garriott notes that while UN treaties ban governmental ownership of property on other celestial bodies, corporations and private citizens retain such rights. Lunokhod 2 is still in use, with mirrors aligned to reflect lasers such that precise Earth-Moon distances can be measured. With his vehicle still in use, Garriott claims property rights to the territory surveyed by Lunokhod 2. This may be the first valid claim for private ownership of extraterrestrial territory. Lunokhod 2 held the record for distance traveled on the surface of another planetary body until it was surpassed by NASA's Opportunity Rover in 2014.

From 1988 to 1994 Garriott built a haunted house/museum every other year at Britannia Manor, his residence in Austin, Texas. Garriott's haunted houses cost tens of thousands of dollars to create each year and took many months and a sizable team to construct, yet were free to the public.

Garriott promotes private space flight and served as vice-chairman of the board of directors for Space Adventures. He is also a trustee of the X PRIZE Foundation.

Garriott participated in the first zero gravity wedding on June 20, 2009, with his wife Laetitia Garriott de Cayeux. The wedding took place in a specially modified Boeing 727-200 aircraft, G-Force One, operated by a company Garriott co-founded, Zero Gravity Corporation.

Garriott wrote a memoir (with David Fisher) covering his accomplishments in games publishing and spaceflight, entitled Explore/Create: My Life in Pursuit of New Frontiers, Hidden Worlds, and the Creative Spark. It was published on January 10, 2017.

Garriott was the inspiration for the character James Halliday in Ernest Cline's Ready Player One.

Garriott is on the executive advisory board of Colossal Biosciences.

== Awards ==
- Garriott was named Ernst & Young Entrepreneur of the Year Award in 1992.
- Garriott became the ninth inductee into the Academy of Interactive Arts and Sciences' Hall of Fame in 2006.
- Garriott became the sixth recipient of the Game Developers Choice Lifetime Achievement Award in 2006.
- Garriott received the British Interplanetary Society's Sir Arthur Clarke Award for Best Individual Achievement in 2009.
- Garriott received the British Interplanetary Society's Astronaut Pin given to British-born astronauts in 2009.
- Garriott was inducted into the Environmental Hall of Fame in 2010.

== Games ==
Game name	First released	Garriott's role(s)
Akalabeth: World of Doom	1979	Game designer & programmer
Ultima I: The First Age of Darkness	1981	Original conceptor, programmer & graphic artist
Ultima II: The Revenge of the Enchantress	1982	Game designer
Ultima III: Exodus	1983	Project director
Ultima IV: Quest of the Avatar	1985	Project director
Autoduel	1985	Programmer & designer
Ultima V: Warriors of Destiny	1988	Designer, writer & programmer
Omega	1989	Designer
Ultima VI: The False Prophet	1990	Designer, producer, sound effect worker, writer & voice actor
Worlds of Ultima: The Savage Empire	1990	Executive producer
Ultima: Worlds of Adventure 2: Martian Dreams	1991	Creative director
Ultima: Runes of Virtue	1991	Creative director
Ultima Underworld: The Stygian Abyss	1992	Director & voice actor
Ultima VII: The Black Gate	1992	Director & producer
Ultima VII: Forge of Virtue	1993	Creative assistance & producer
Ultima VII Part Two: Serpent Isle	1993	Creative director & audio team member
Ultima VII Part Two: The Silver Seed	1993	Director & voice actor
Ultima VIII: Pagan	1994	Producer
Ultima: Runes of Virtue II	1994	Creative director & additional design
Ultima VIII: The Lost Vale	Cancelled	Producer
BioForge	1995	Executive producer
Ultima Online	1997	Producer
Ultima Online: The Second Age	1998	Executive designer
Lineage	1998	Executive producer
Ultima IX: Ascension	1999	Director
Lineage II	2003	Executive producer
City of Heroes	2004	Executive producer
City of Villains	2005	Executive management
Tabula Rasa	2007	Creative director & executive producer
Shroud of the Avatar: Forsaken Virtues	2018	Creative director
Iron and Magic	TBD	Creative director

== See also ==
- List of people who descended to Challenger Deep
