= Soyuz TMA-13 =

2008 Russian crewed spaceflight to the ISS

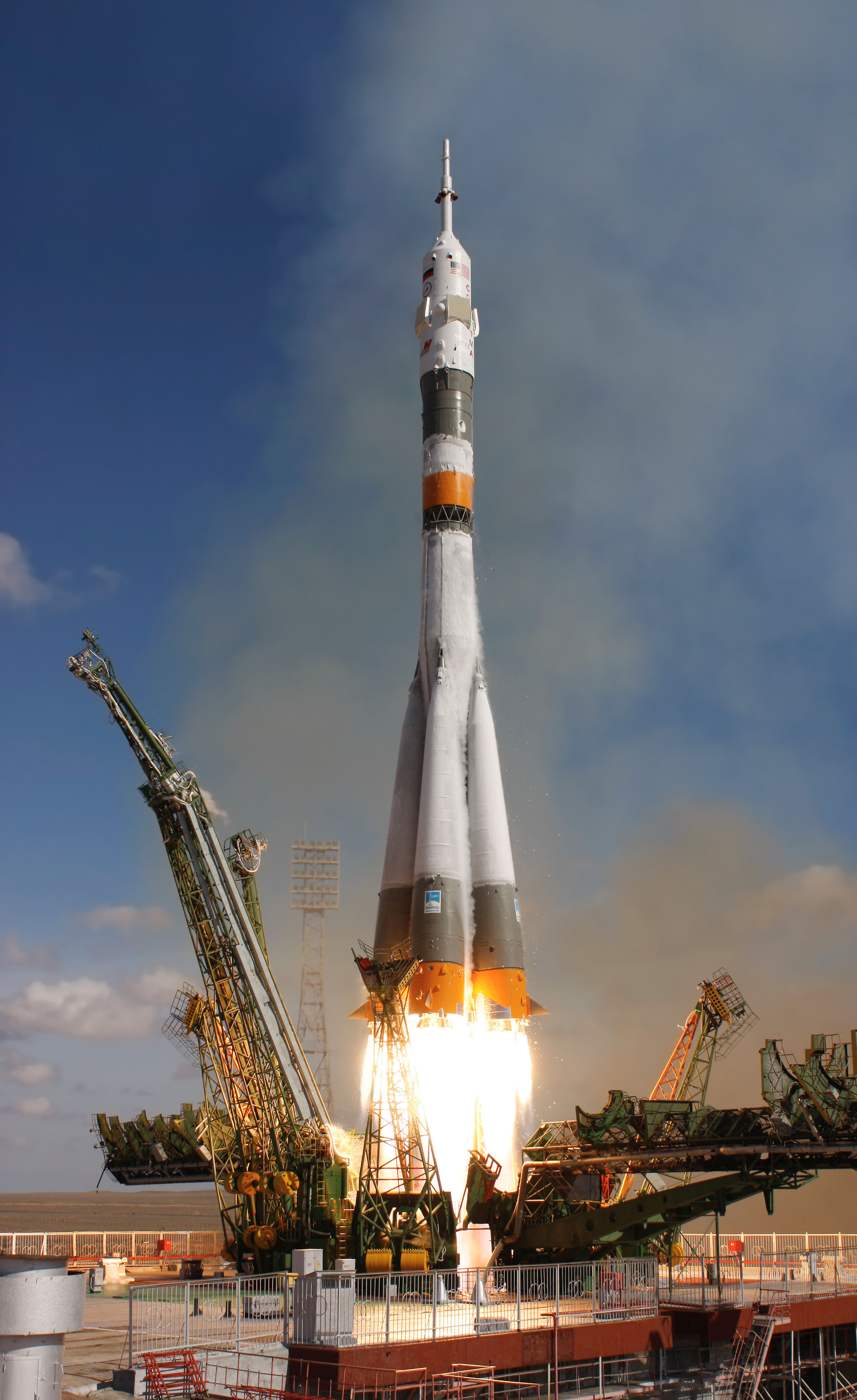
- Soyuz TMA-13 lifts off from Gagarin's Start
- Operator: Roscosmos
- COSPAR ID: 2008-050A
- SATCAT no.: 33399
- Mission duration: 178d 15m

Spacecraft properties
- Spacecraft type: Soyuz-TMA
- Manufacturer: Energia

Crew
- Crew size: 3
- Members: Yury Lonchakov; Michael Fincke
- Launching: Richard Garriott
- Landing: Charles Simonyi
- Callsign: Titan

Start of mission
- Launch date: 12 October 2008, 07:01 UTC
- Rocket: Soyuz-FG
- Launch site: Baikonur 1/5

End of mission
- Landing date: 8 April 2009, 07:16 UTC

Orbital parameters
- Reference system: Geocentric
- Regime: Low Earth

Docking with ISS
- Docking port: Zarya nadir
- Docking date: 14 October 2008; 08:26 UTC
- Undocking date: 8 April 2009; 03:55 UTC
- Time docked: 175d 19h 29m
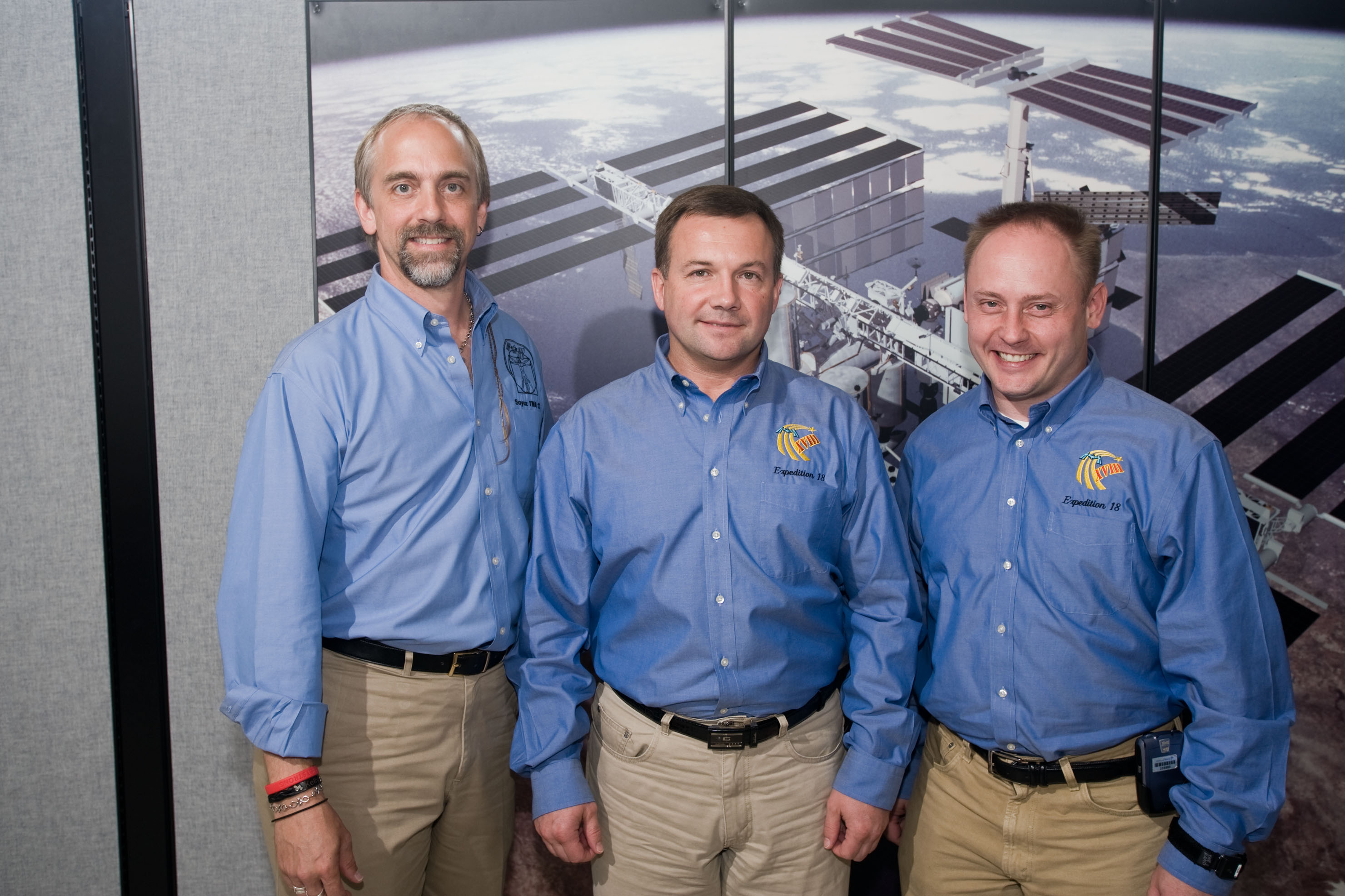
- From left to right: Richard Garriott, Yury Lonchakov, Michael Fincke Soyuz programme (Crewed missions)

Soyuz TMA-13 (Russian: Союз ТМА-13, Union TMA-13) was a Soyuz mission to the International Space Station (ISS). The spacecraft was launched by a Soyuz-FG rocket at 07:01 GMT on 12 October 2008. It undocked at 02:55 GMT on 8 April 2009, performed a deorbit burn at 06:24, and landed at 07:16. By some counts, Soyuz TMA-13 is the 100th Soyuz spacecraft to be crewed.

== Crew ==
Position	Launching crew	Landing crew
Commander	(Russia) Yury Lonchakov, Roscosmos; Expedition 18; Third and last spaceflight	
Flight Engineer	(United States) Michael Fincke, NASA; Expedition 18; Second spaceflight	
Spaceflight Participant	(United Kingdom) / (United States) Richard Garriott, SA; Only spaceflight Tourist	(Hungary) / (United States) Charles Simonyi, SA; Second and last spaceflight Tourist

=== Backup crew ===
Position	Launching crew	Landing crew
Commander	(Russia) Gennady Padalka, Roscosmos	
Flight Engineer	(United States) Michael Barratt, NASA	
Spaceflight Participant	(Australia) Nik Halik, SA; Tourist	(United States) Esther Dyson, SA; Tourist

== Crew notes ==
- Richard Garriott flew on TMA-13 as a guest of the Russian government through a spaceflight participant program run by Space Adventures. His role aboard the Soyuz is referred to as a Spaceflight Participant in English-language Russian Federal Space Agency documents, and NASA documents and press briefings.
- Salizhan Sharipov had originally been assigned to command this Soyuz flight and participate in Expedition 18, but was replaced by Yury Lonchakov.
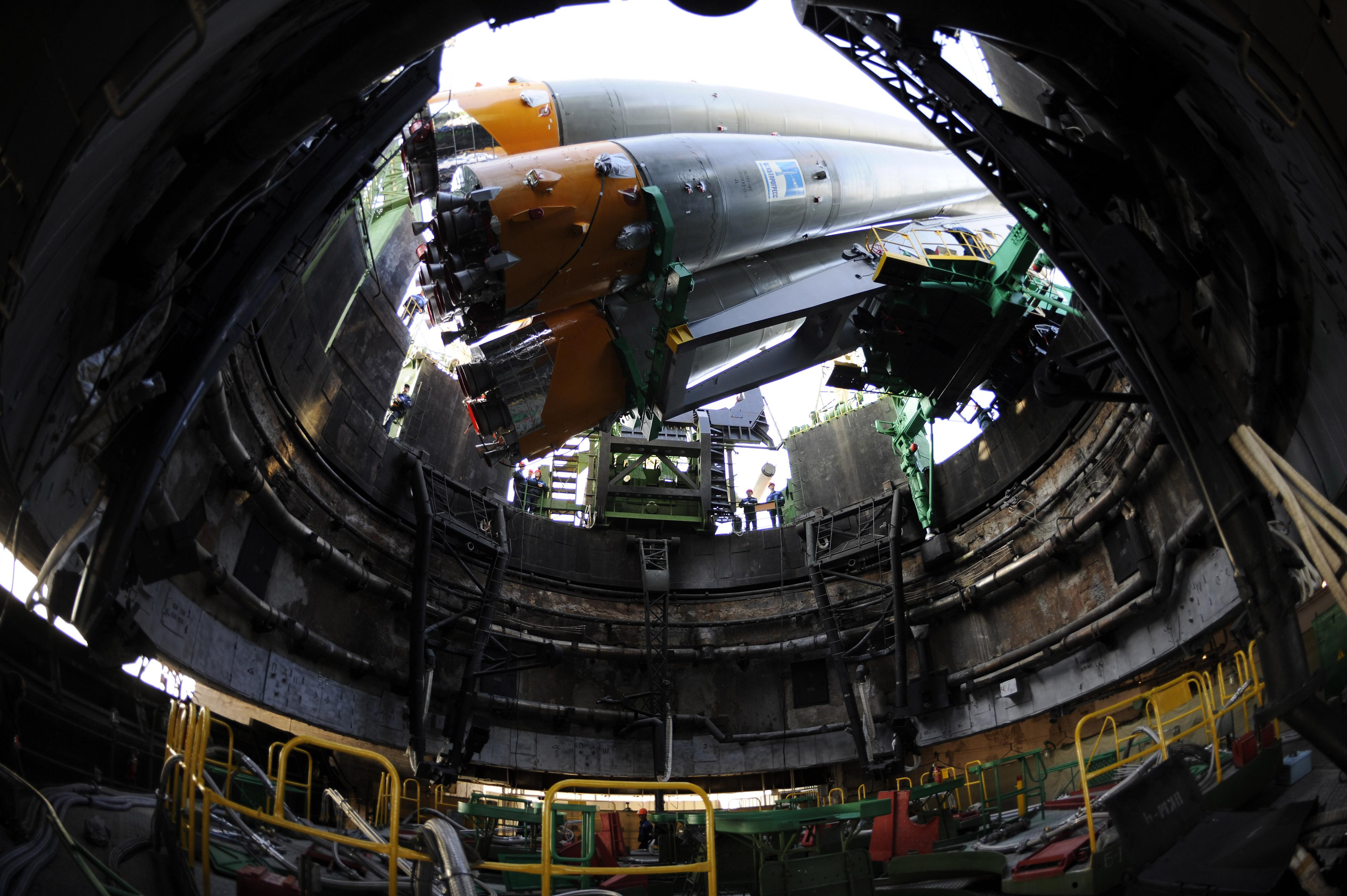
Soyuz TMA-13 arrives at the launch pad at the Baikonur Cosmodrome on 10 October 2008

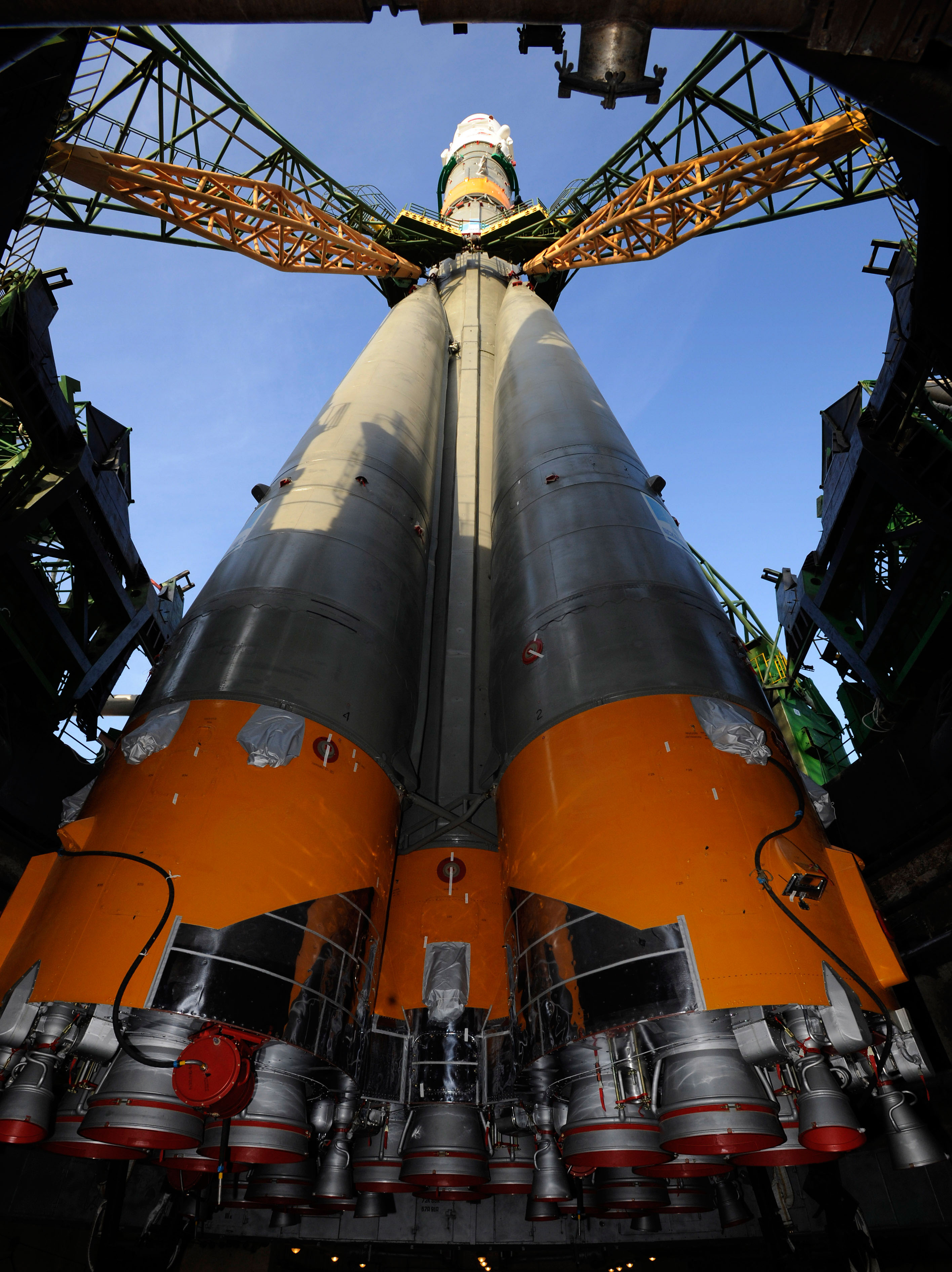
Soyuz TMA-13 erected at the Baikonur Cosmodrome launch pad 1/5 Gagarin's Start

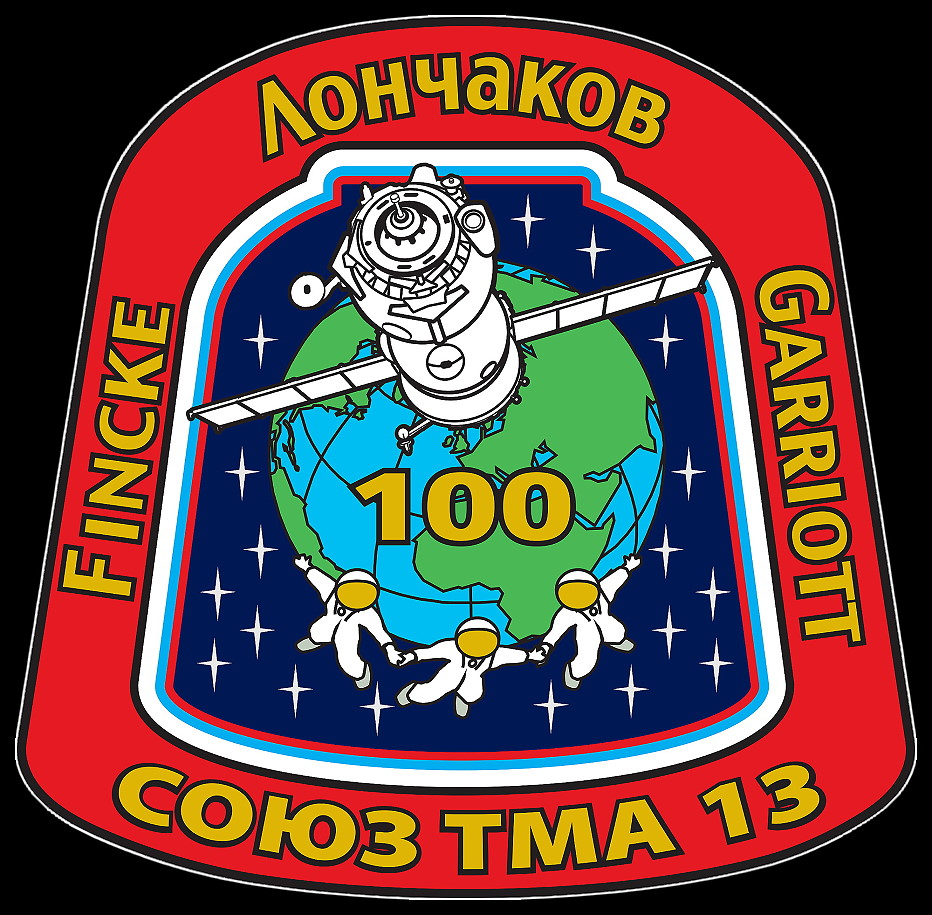
Crew Patch
