= STS-124 =

2008 American crewed spaceflight to the ISS

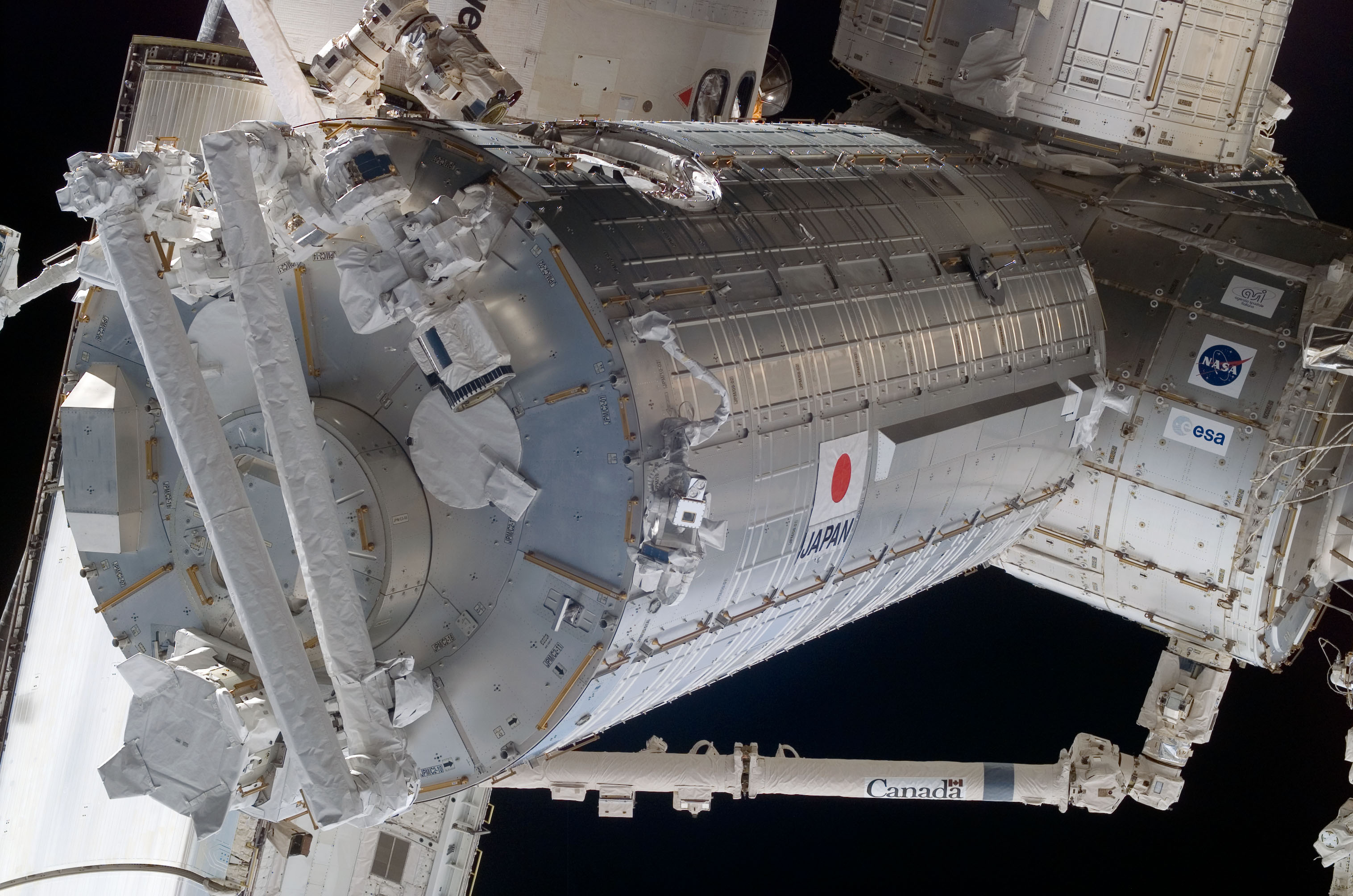
- Kibō's pressurized module, two days after its installation, with Discovery in the background
- Names: Space Transportation System-124
- Mission type: ISS assembly
- Operator: NASA
- COSPAR ID: 2008-027A
- SATCAT no.: 32960
- Mission duration: 13 days, 18 hours, 13 minutes 7 seconds
- Distance travelled: 9,230,622.6 kilometers (5,735,643.0 mi)
- Orbits completed: 217

Spacecraft properties
- Spacecraft: Space Shuttle Discovery
- Launch mass: 122,072 kilograms (269,123 lb)
- Landing mass: 92,220 kilograms (203,320 lb)
- Payload mass: 17530 kg

Crew
- Crew size: 7
- Members: Mark E. Kelly; Kenneth T. Ham; Karen L. Nyberg; Ronald J. Garan Jr.; Michael E. Fossum; Akihiko Hoshide
- Launching: Gregory E. Chamitoff
- Landing: Garret E. Reisman

Start of mission
- Launch date: May 31, 2008, 21:02:12 UTC
- Launch site: Kennedy, LC-39A

End of mission
- Landing date: June 14, 2008, 15:15:19 UTC
- Landing site: Kennedy, SLF Runway 15

Orbital parameters
- Reference system: Geocentric
- Regime: Low Earth
- Perigee altitude: 307 kilometres (166 nmi)
- Apogee altitude: 328 kilometres (177 nmi)
- Inclination: 51.6 degrees
- Period: 91 minutes

Docking with ISS
- Docking port: PMA-2 (Harmony forward)
- Docking date: June 2, 2008, 18:03 UTC
- Undocking date: June 11, 2008, 11:42 UTC
- Time docked: 8 days, 17 hours, 39 minutes
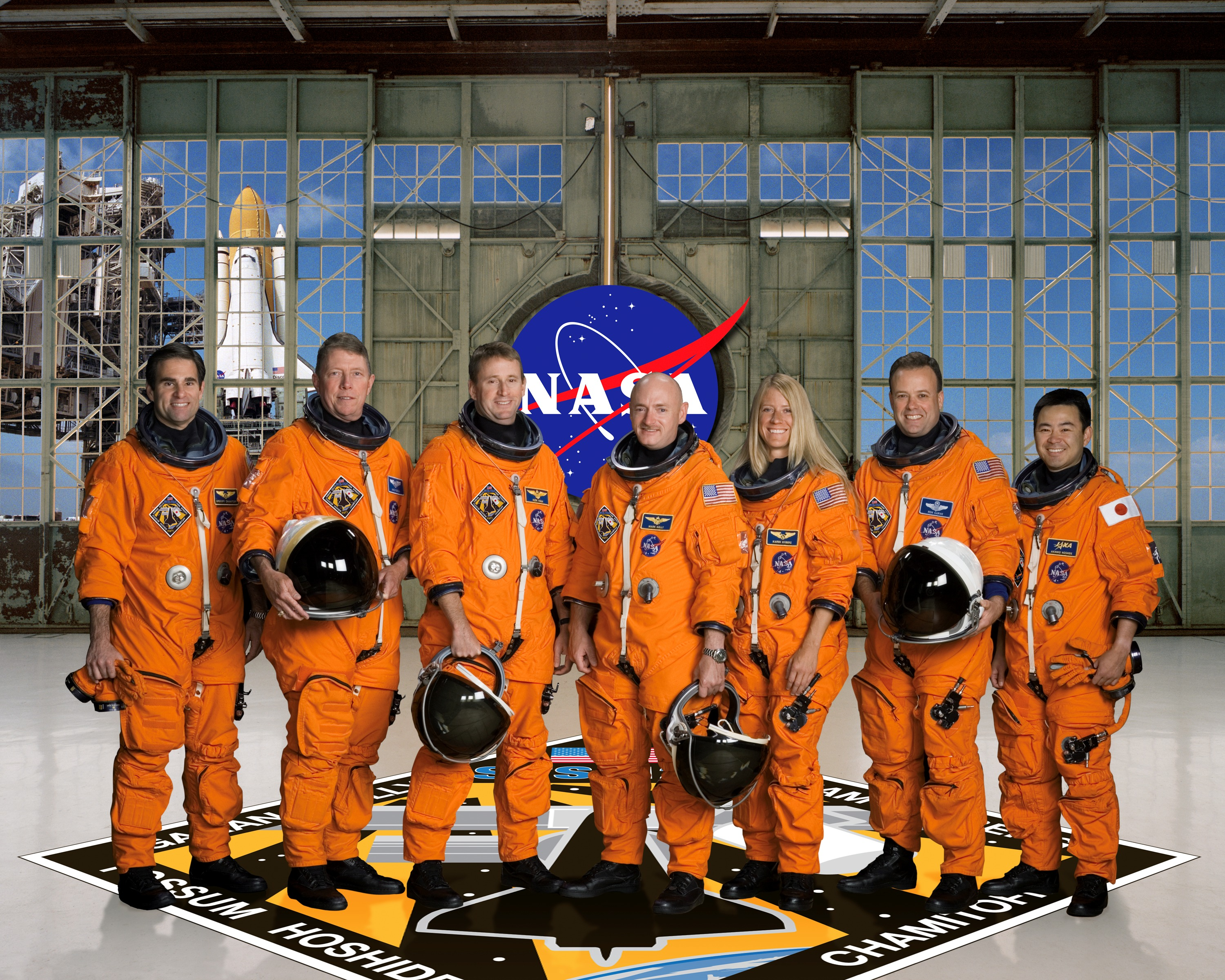
- From left to right: Chamitoff, Fossum, Ham, Kelly, Nyberg, Garan and Hoshide Space Shuttle program

STS-124 was the 35th mission of Space Shuttle Discovery. It went to the International Space Station on this mission. Discovery launched on May 31, 2008, at 17:02 EDT, moved from an earlier scheduled launch date of May 25, 2008, and landed safely at the Kennedy Space Center's Shuttle Landing Facility, at 11:15 EDT on June 14, 2008. Its objective was to deliver the largest module of the space station – Kibō, the Japanese Experiment Module pressurized section. The mission is also referred to as ISS-1J by the ISS program.

== Crew ==
Position	Launching Astronaut	Landing Astronaut
Commander	(United States) Mark Kelly; Third spaceflight	
Pilot	(United States) Kenneth Ham; First spaceflight	
Mission Specialist 1	(United States) Karen Nyberg; First spaceflight	
Mission Specialist 2 Flight Engineer	(United States) Ronald J. Garan Jr. First spaceflight	
Mission Specialist 3	(United States) Michael E. Fossum; Second spaceflight	
Mission Specialist 4	(Japan) Akihiko Hoshide, JAXA; First spaceflight	
Mission Specialist 5	(United States) Gregory Chamitoff; Expedition 17; First spaceflight ISS Flight Engineer	(United States) Garrett Reisman; Expedition 17; First spaceflight ISS Flight Engineer

=== Crew notes ===
- Stephen G. Bowen was originally assigned to STS-124 but was moved to STS-126 to allow this mission to rotate an ISS crew member. Bowen was scheduled to perform the EVAs on the flight along with Fossum. Garan took his place for the EVAs.

=== Commander Kelly discusses the crew ===
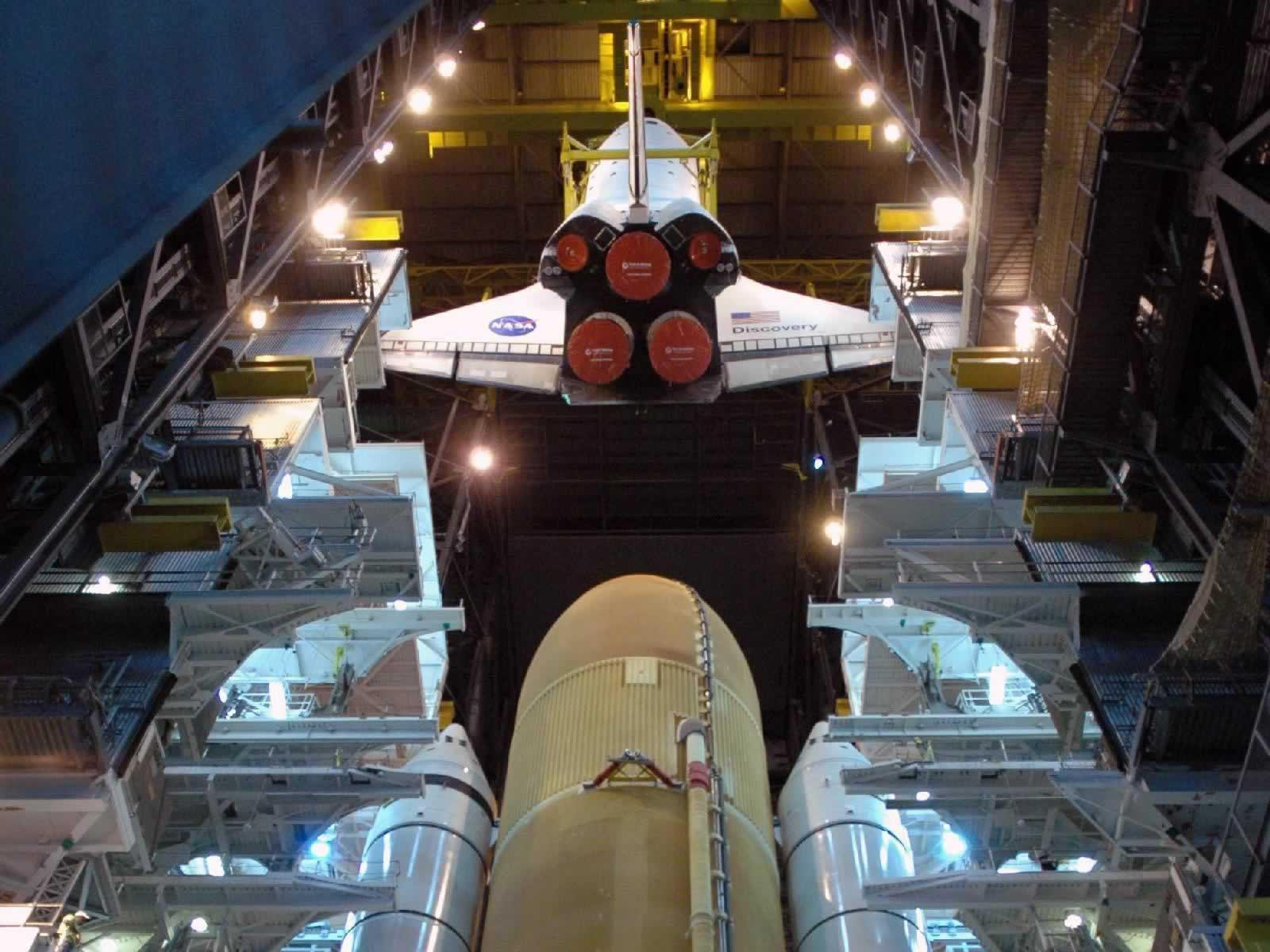
A crane moves Discovery toward the external tank and SRBs in high bay 3 of the Vehicle Assembly Building for STS-124.

"I'm really fortunate to be given the crew members that I have on this mission. It's myself and six others. We do swap one of our crew members with the expedition crew member on board. So Greg goes up, Greg stays on station and Garrett comes home. But the crew that was assigned to me—I'm really fortunate to have some really talented people. Ken Ham, as a pilot, knows the orbiter better than anybody I've seen. This is his first flight. My lead EVA crew member is Mike Fossum who did three spacewalks on my previous flight, STS-121. We've flown together before. I have all the confidence in the world in his ability to execute these EVAs. Karen Nyberg, my MS1, sits on the flight deck for ascent and entry. She's also the lead for all the robotic arm operations. She'll be flying three robotic arms in space, incredibly motivated, well ahead of the game and I expect great things from her. Ron Garan is my flight engineer, a colonel in the Air Force. This is going to be his first time in space as well as is Karen's and Ken's and he's doing three spacewalks. So he's got a lot on his plate. He's been doing great during training and he's going to have the opportunity to prove himself during these three spacewalks. I kind of wish it was me getting to go outside. I can't do that, but we expect great things from Ron as well. And then I have Aki Hoshide, our Japanese crew member, who grew up in New Jersey kind of like me. That's an interesting thing about our flight—we have four people from New Jersey on the mission. I look at Aki as the payload commander. He is responsible for that Japanese laboratory and he has taken on that responsibility as completely as I could have hoped for. All through our training he's been very much focused on the Japanese lab, making sure it's ready to go, making sure we're completely trained on the systems and everything we have to do. I've given him a lot of responsibility and he's completely taken it on."

- Gregory Chamitoff brought the first bagels into space: 3 bags (18 sesame seed Montreal-style bagels) with him.

== Mission payloads ==
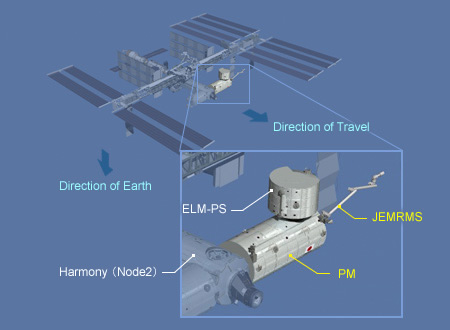
ISS configuration after the STS-124 Mission (1J) is completed．

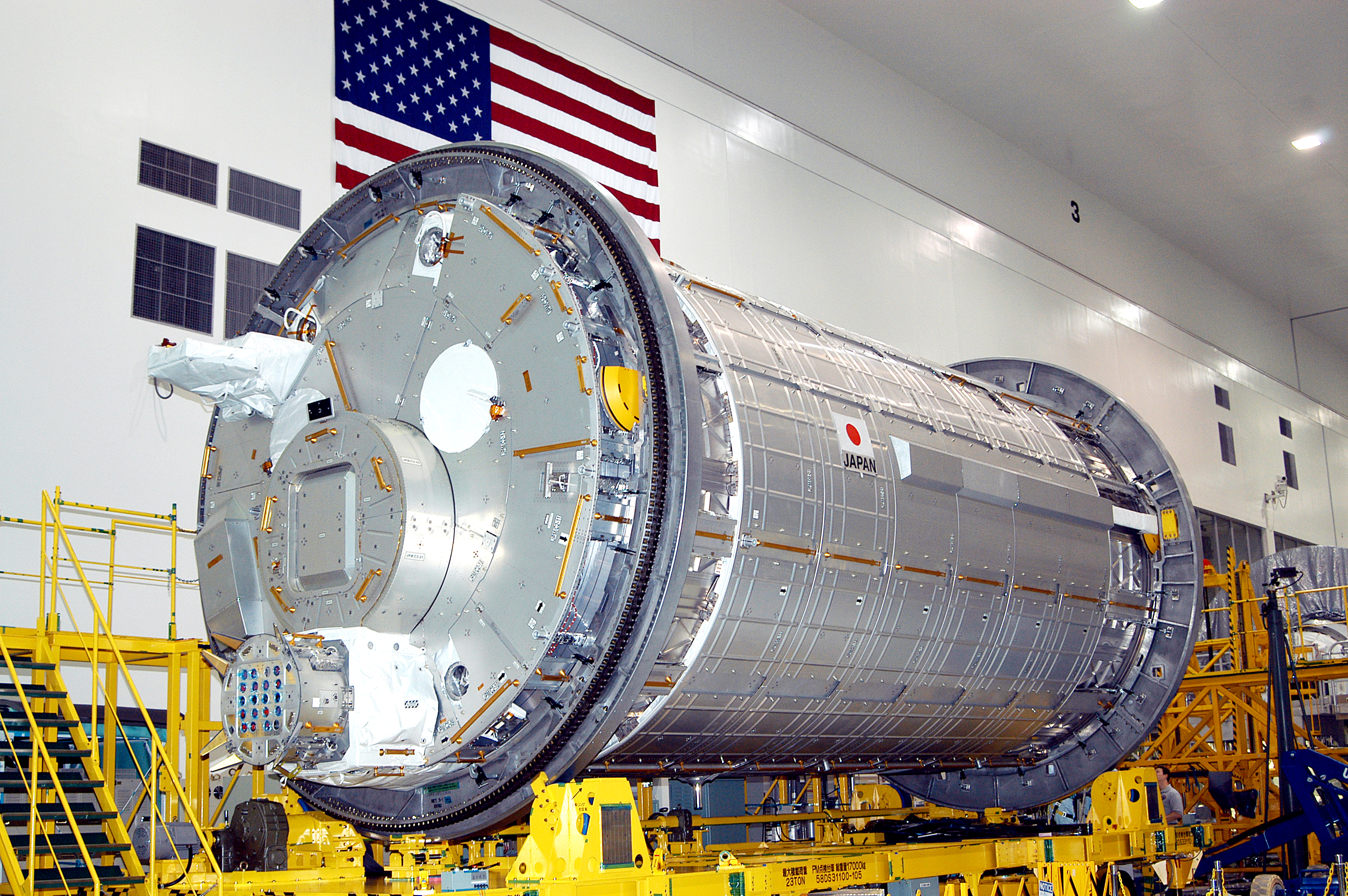
JEM Kibō Pressurized Module during assembly at the Space Station Processing Facility

STS-124 delivered the Pressurized Module (PM) of the Japanese Experiment Module (JEM), called Kibō, to the International Space Station (ISS). Kibō was berthed to the Harmony module and the pressurized section of the JEM Experiment Logistics Module, brought up by the STS-123 crew, was moved from Harmony to the JEM-PM. The Japanese Remote Manipulator System, a robotic arm, was also delivered by STS-124 and attached to Kibō. The entire Kibō laboratory was brought up over three missions. All the modules were manufactured at the Tsukuba Space Center and were shipped to the KSC SSPF for launch processing. It is manufactured from stainless steel and titanium.

Discovery carried with it replacement parts in a mid-deck locker for a malfunctioning toilet on the International Space Station. The crew had been using other facilities for waste until the new replacement parts were installed on the Zvezda module of the ISS.

Flying with the STS-124 crew was an action figure of Buzz Lightyear, a fictional character in the Toy Story franchise. Ken Ham, pilot of the STS-124 mission, brought with him episodes of ESPN Radio's Mike and Mike in the Morning, and a plastic microphone stand with the ESPN logo on it. Along with those, a yellow jersey from Lance Armstrong's record-setting seven victories at the Tour de France bicycle race, the backup jersey Eli Manning took to the Super Bowl, and the last jersey that American Major League Baseball's Craig Biggio wore in a game were placed inside the orbiter's lockers.

With the completion of STS-124, the next permanent pressurized module would not be delivered to the ISS by a Space Shuttle until STS-130 brought up Tranquility in February 2010.

=== Crew seat assignments ===
Seat	Launch	Landing	Seats 1–4 are on the flight deck. Seats 5–7 are on the mid-deck.
1	Kelly		Seats 1–4 are on the flight deck. Seats 5–7 are on the mid-deck.
2	Ham		Seats 1–4 are on the flight deck. Seats 5–7 are on the mid-deck.
3	Nyberg		Seats 1–4 are on the flight deck. Seats 5–7 are on the mid-deck.
4	Garan		Seats 1–4 are on the flight deck. Seats 5–7 are on the mid-deck.
5	Fossum		Seats 1–4 are on the flight deck. Seats 5–7 are on the mid-deck.
6	Hoshide		Seats 1–4 are on the flight deck. Seats 5–7 are on the mid-deck.
7	Chamitoff	Reisman	Seats 1–4 are on the flight deck. Seats 5–7 are on the mid-deck.

== Mission background ==
The mission marked:

- 154th NASA crewed spaceflight
- 123rd Space Shuttle flight since STS-1
- 98th post-Challenger mission
- 10th post-Columbia mission
- 11th flight remaining in the shuttle program
- 26th flight to the ISS
- 35th flight for shuttle Discovery
- 3rd shuttle mission in 2008

== Shuttle processing ==
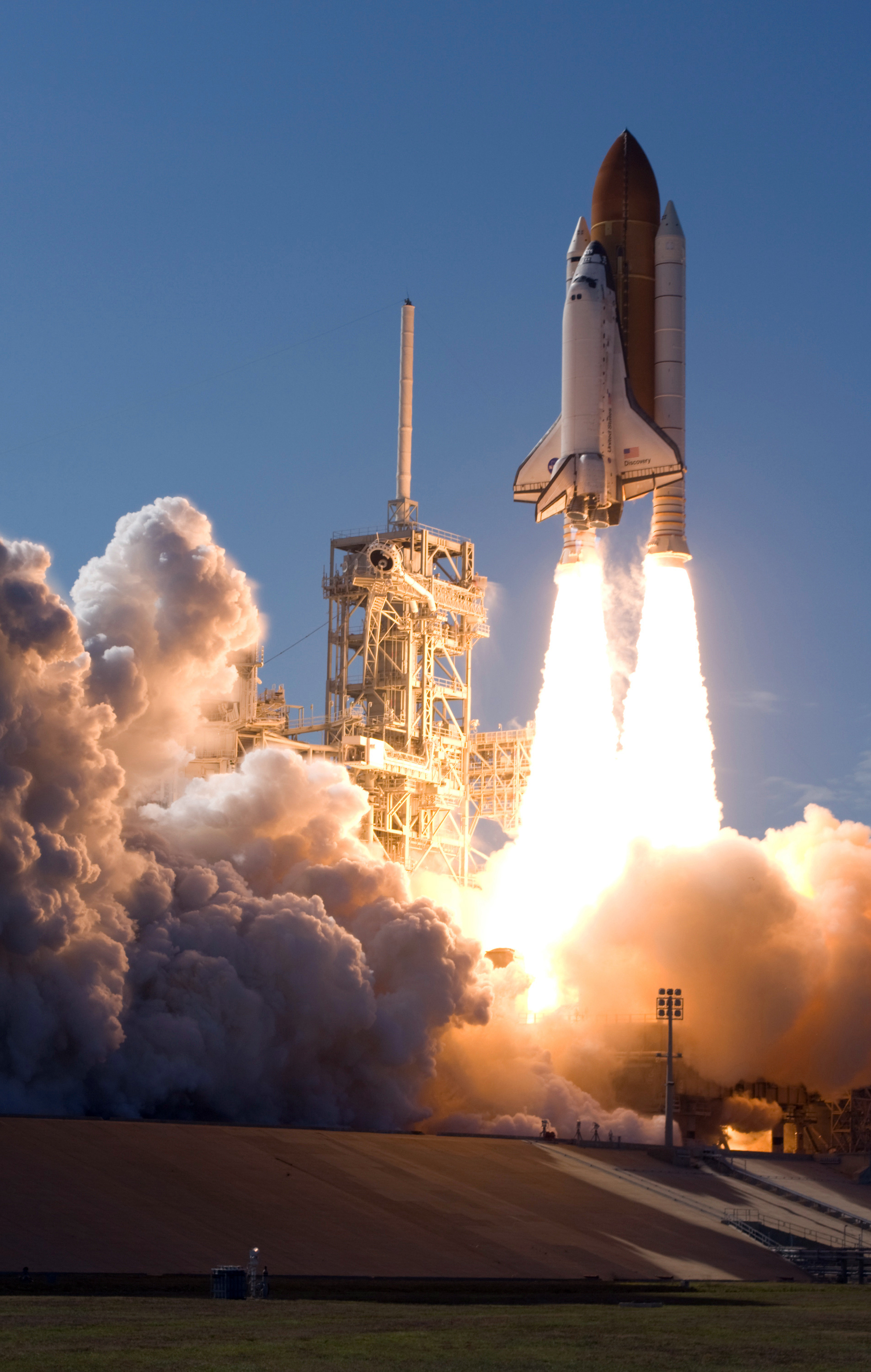
Space Shuttle Discovery lifts off on mission STS-124.

On April 26, 2008 Discovery was rolled over to the Vehicle Assembly Building (VAB) from its processing bay in the Orbiter Processing Facility. Once in the VAB it was lifted vertically and mated with its external tank and solid rocket boosters on April 28, 2008. At the end of a week-long prep schedule on May 2, 2008, at 23:47 EDT the stack was rolled out to launch pad 39A on top the Mobile Launch Platform. Carried by the Crawler Transporter, Discovery arrived and was secured at LC-39A on May 3, 2008, at 06:06 EDT. The payload canister containing the JEM was rolled out to the Payload Changeout Room at the pad on April 29, 2008, and was later installed into Discovery's payload bay on May 5, 2008. The STS-124 crew arrived at Kennedy Space Center on May 6, 2008, for the 3-day Terminal Countdown Demonstration Test and returned to Johnson Space Center on May 9, 2008, after completion of the launch dress rehearsal. After many flight readiness review tests, Discovery was given a go for a May 31, 2008, launch. Discovery launched on May 31, 2008, at 21:02 UTC.

== Mission timeline ==
=== May 31 (Flight day 1, Launch) ===
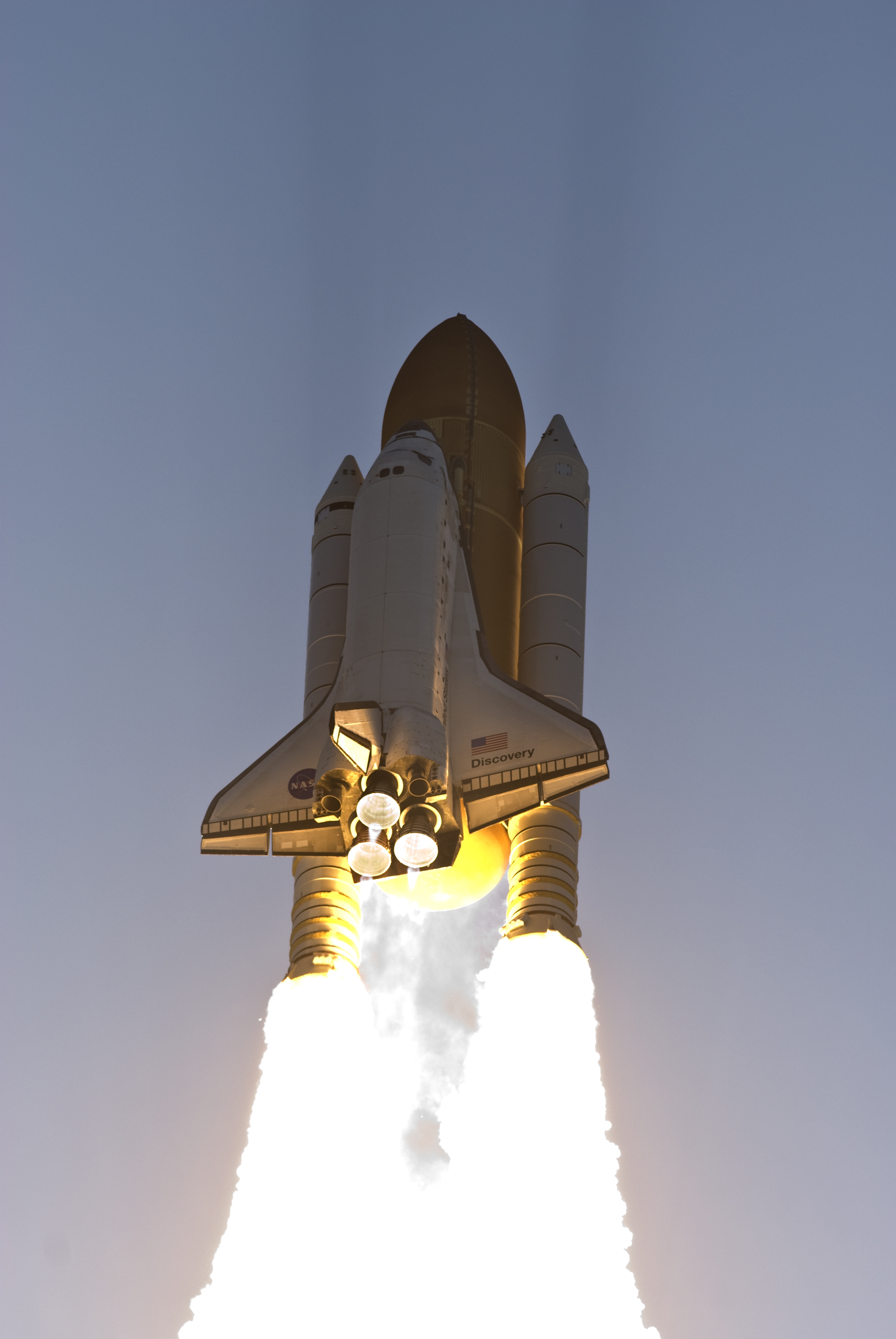
STS-124 launch close-up

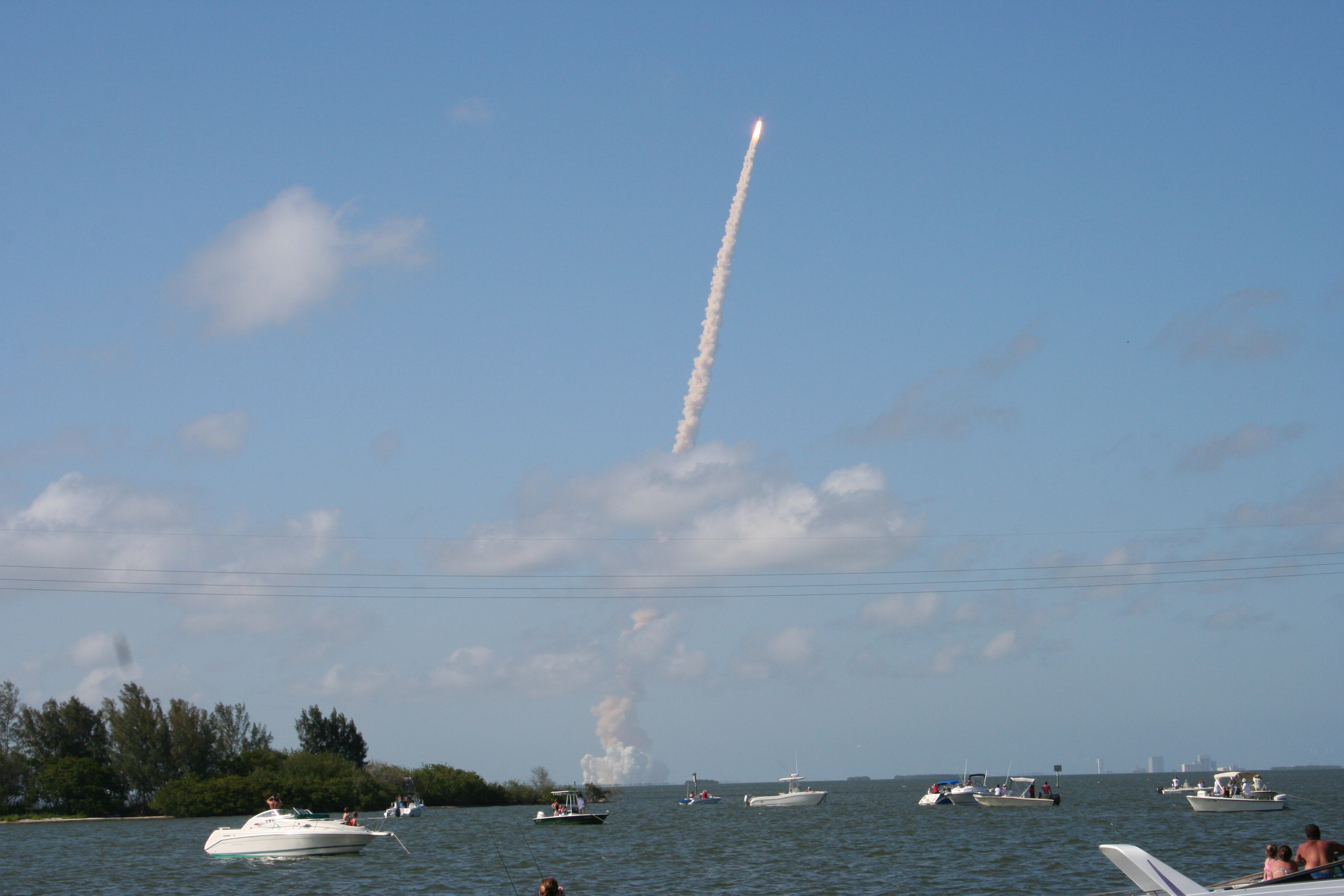
STS-124 launch viewed from spoil islands.

The Space Shuttle Discovery launched from the Kennedy Space Center at 17:02 EDT local time. Debris from the fuel tank was minimal.

"While we've all prepared for this event today, the discoveries from Kibo will definitely offer hope for tomorrow," said Discovery's commander Mark Kelly just before launch. "Now stand by for the greatest show on Earth."

==== Launch pad damage ====
One of the trenches at launch pad 39A that channels flames away from the shuttle during lift-off was significantly damaged. The subsequent mishap investigation found that the damage was the result of carbonation of epoxy and corrosion of steel anchors which held the refractory bricks in place. These had been exacerbated by the fact that hydrochloric acid is an exhaust by-product of the solid rocket boosters. Repairs to the trench were completed before the STS-125 mission's then scheduled launch attempt on October 8, 2008. In fact STS-125 finally launched in May 2009, and in the meantime STS-126 (November 2008) and STS-119 (March 2009) had both been successfully launched from pad 39A.

=== June 1 (Flight day 2) ===
During the first full day in space, Ham and Nyberg completed a limited inspection of the shuttle's thermal protection system using the end effector camera of the shuttle's robotic arm. The crew also installed the centerline camera and extended the orbiter's docking system ring to prepare Discovery' for arrival at the space station.

=== June 2 (Flight day 3) ===
Discovery docked with the space station at 18:03 UTC and the hatches opened at 19:36 UTC. Greg Chamitoff officially joined the Expedition 17 crew, replacing Garrett Reisman.

=== June 3 (Flight day 4) ===
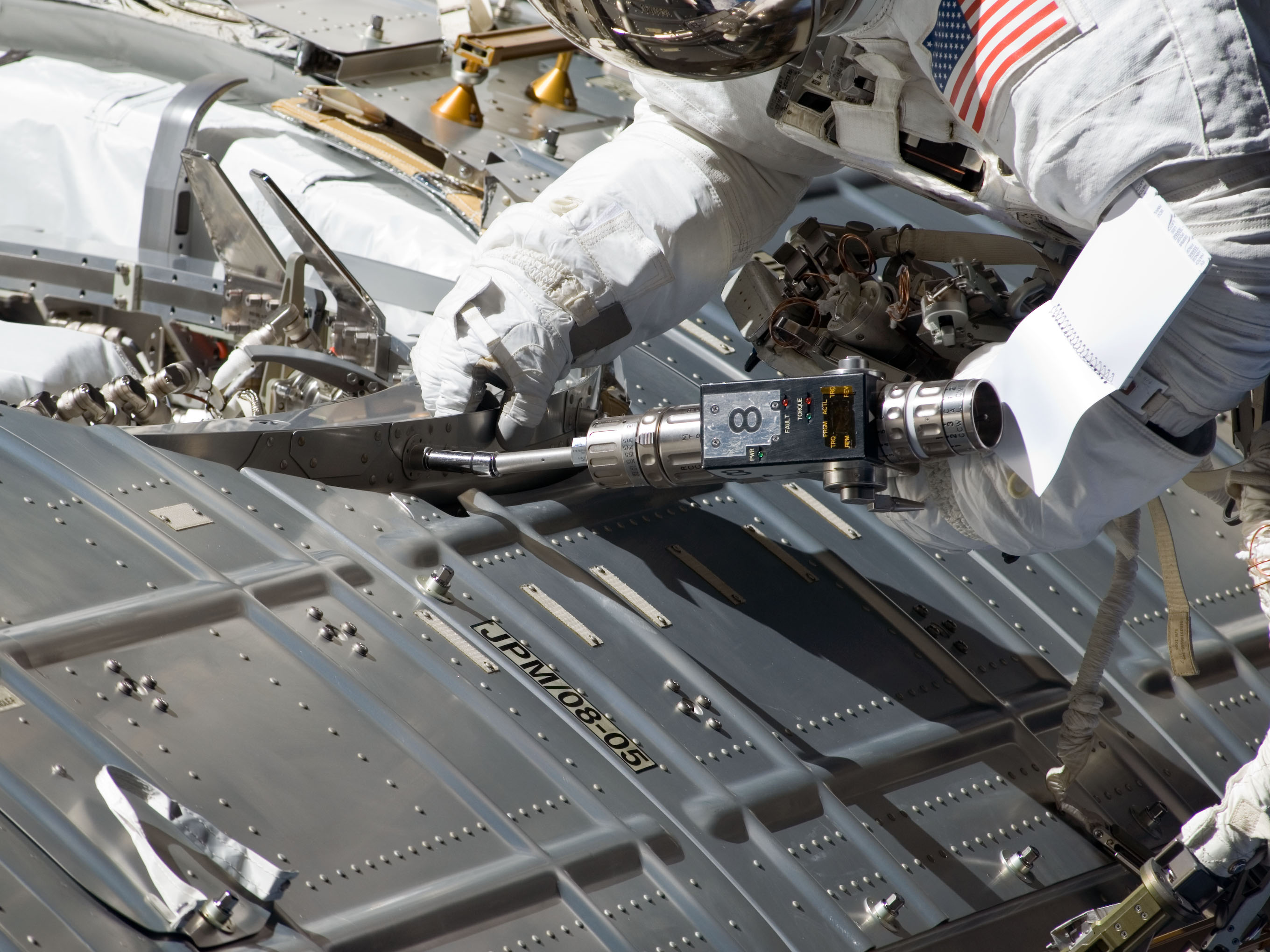
Ron Garan on the mission's second space walk, flight day 6.

Mike Fossum and Ron Garan completed a six-hour-forty-eight-minute spacewalk at 23:10 UTC. During the excursion, the pair retrieved the Orbiter Boom Sensor System, serviced and inspected components of a Solar Alpha Rotary Joint and prepared the JEM-PS component of the Kibō laboratory for installation. Karen Nyberg and Akihiko Hoshide, using the station's robotic arm, removed the JEM-PS from the shuttle's payload bay and latched it in place on the Harmony node, completing the task at 23:01 UTC.

=== June 4 (Flight day 5) ===
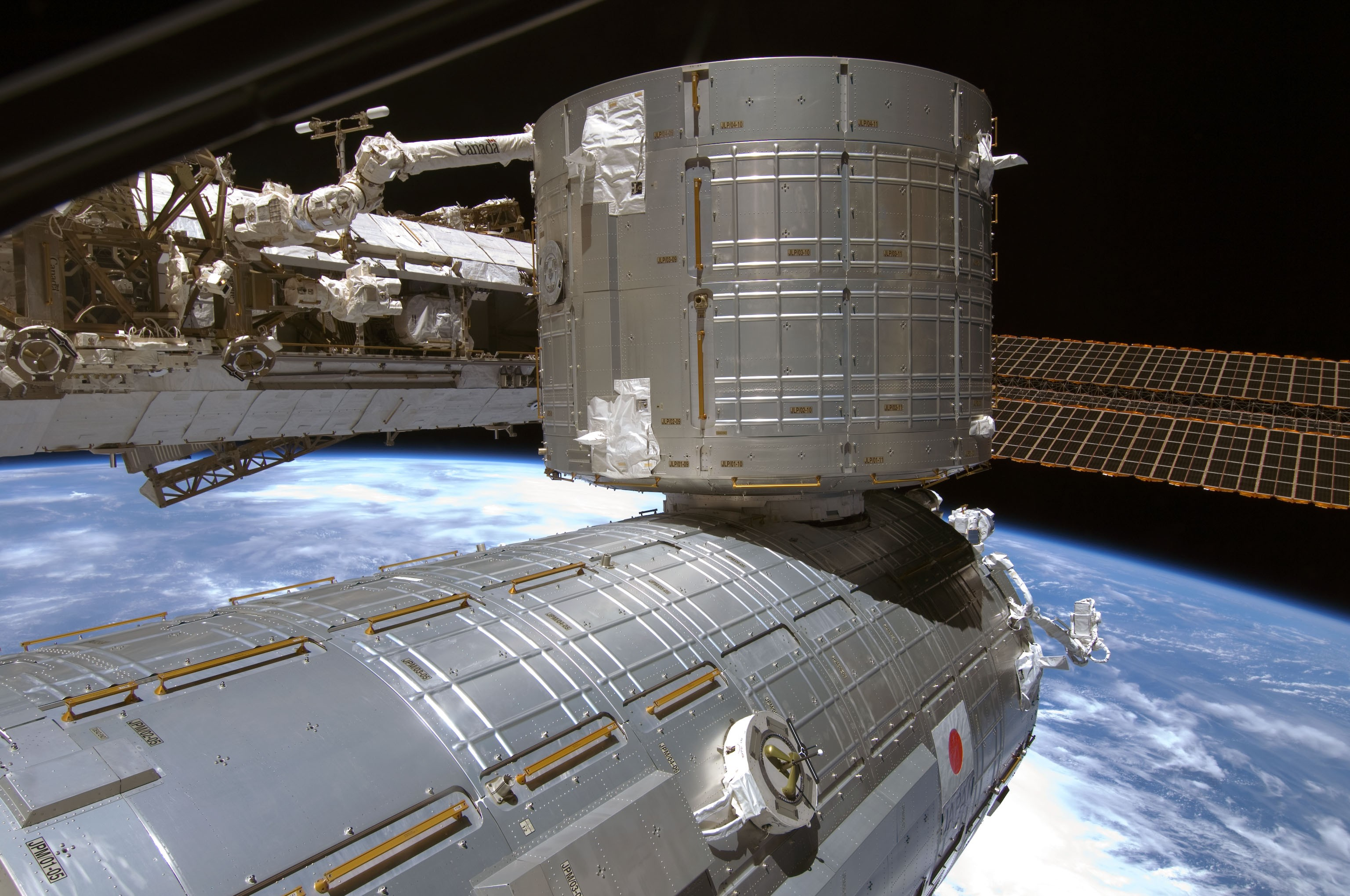
The Kibō module as seen from inside Space Shuttle Discovery

The hatch to the Kibō lab was opened at 21:05 UTC. The crew also repaired the malfunctioning ISS toilet.

=== June 5 (Flight day 6) ===
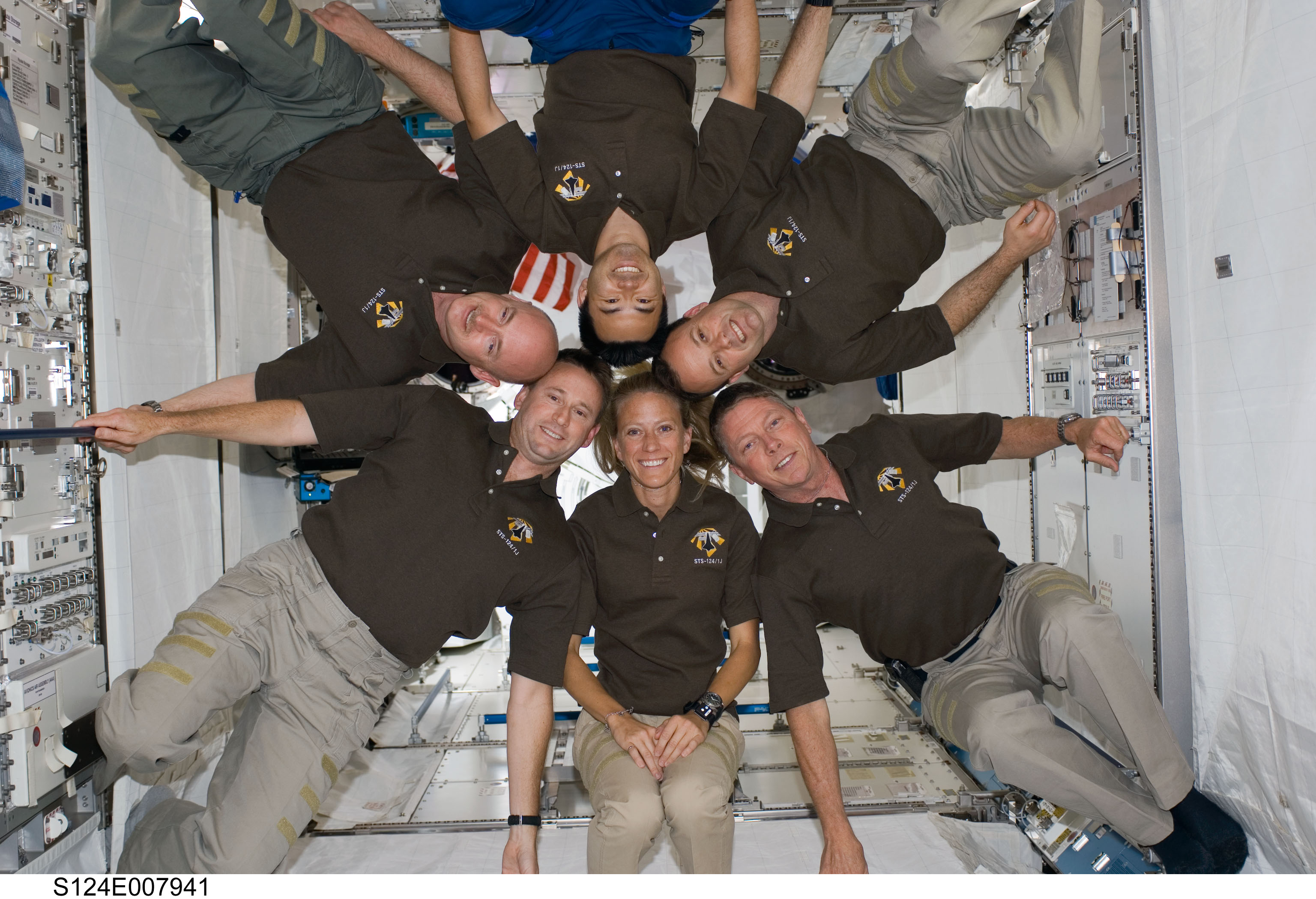
The crew of STS-124 inside the pressurized Kibō module.

Fossum and Garan completed the second STS-124 spacewalk. The 7-hour, 11-minute excursion ended at 22:15 UTC. Prior to heading outside spacewalker Garan stated "Mike and I are getting ready to go out the door for our second spacewalk today. It's going to be a wonderful day."

=== June 6 (Flight day 7) ===
The crew moved the Kibō Logistics Module from Harmony to the Pressurized Module.

=== June 7 (Flight day 8) ===
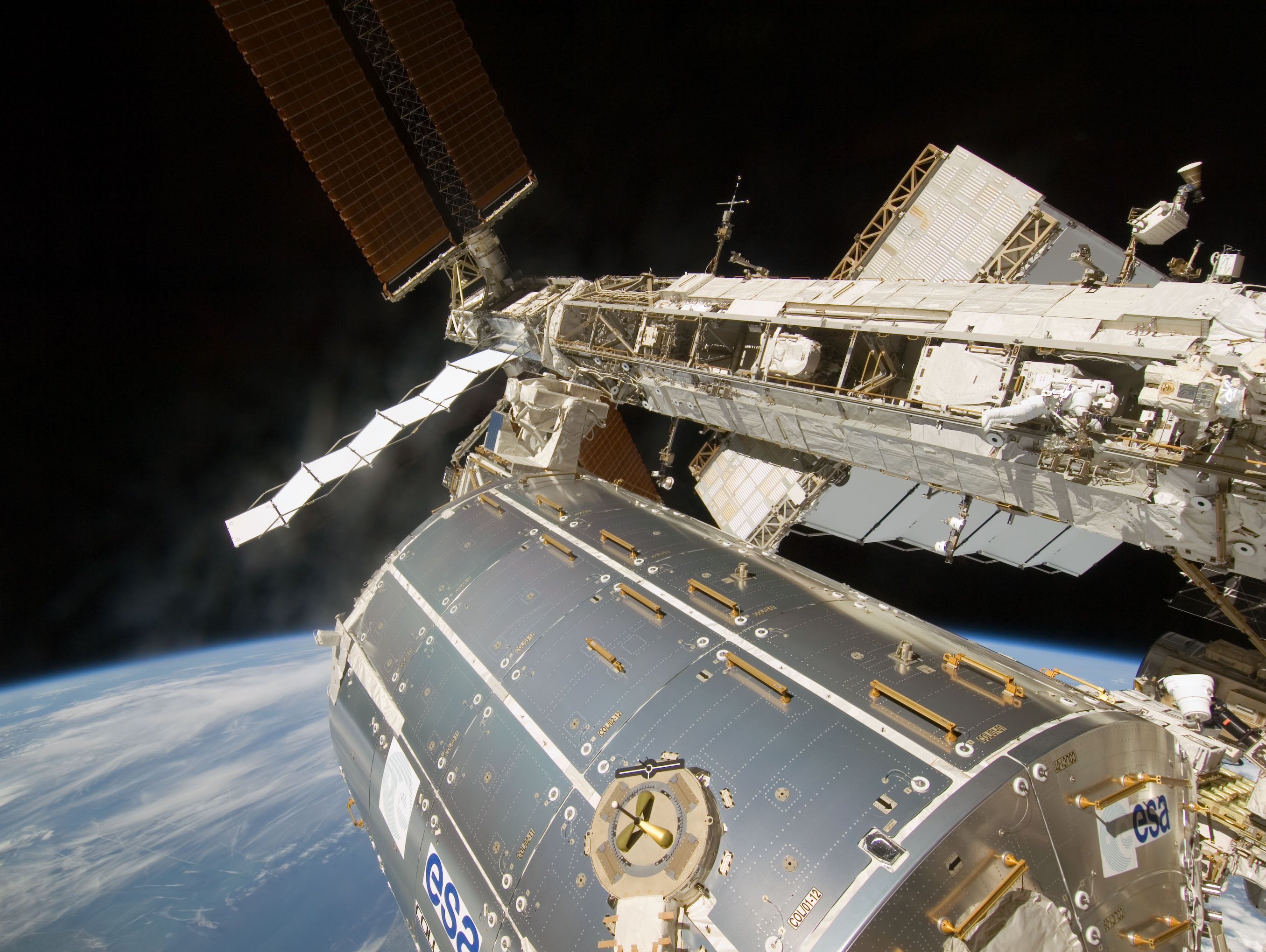
Ron Garan works outside the Columbus lab

Hoshide and Nyberg moved two of the six joints on the Japanese Kibō lab's robotic arm for the first time, maneuvering them very slightly with a series of commands. With the mission at its midpoint astronaut Karen Nyberg commented that "the week has gone way too fast."

=== June 8 (Flight day 9) ===
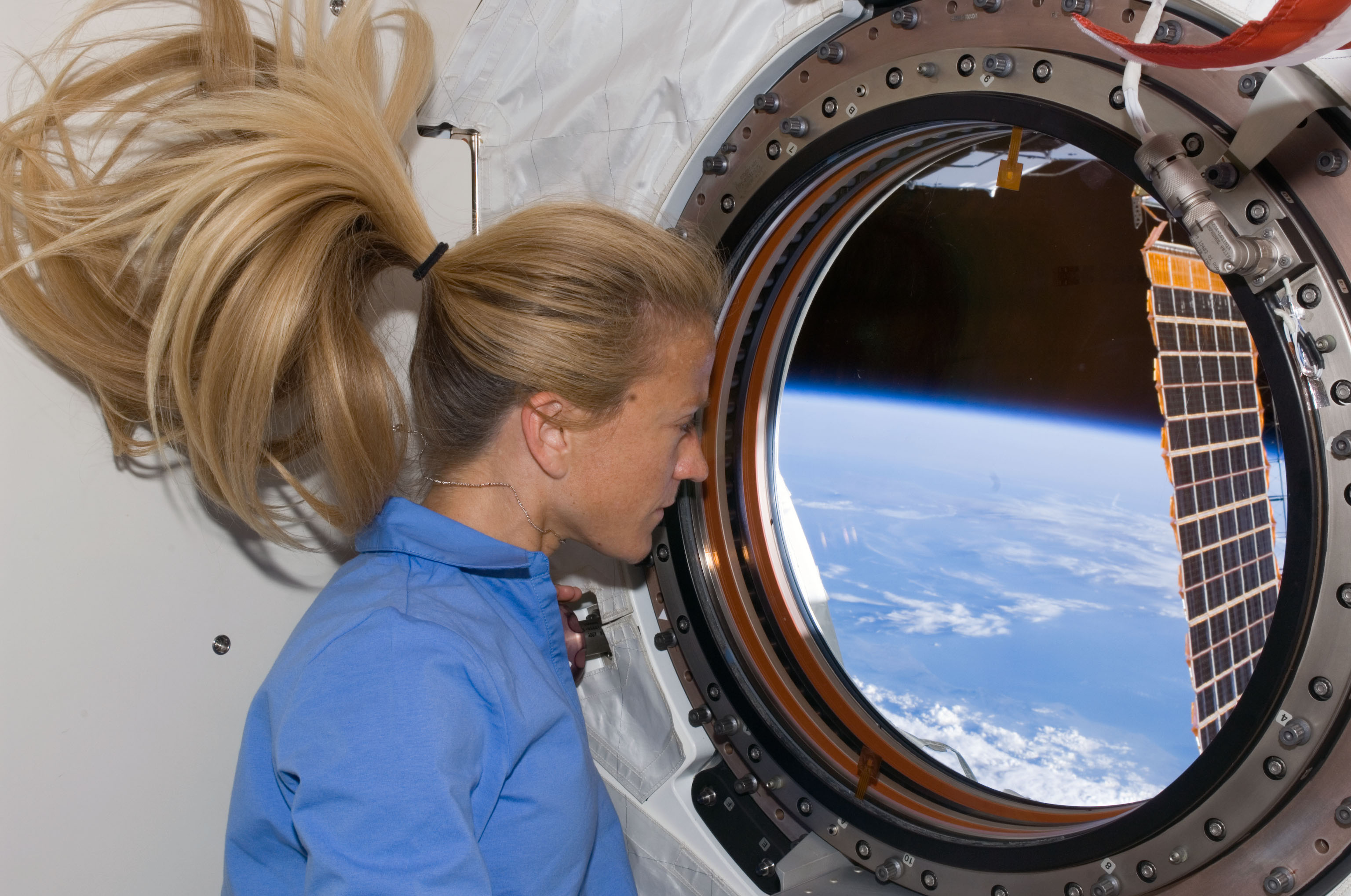
Astronaut Karen Nyberg on flight day 11.

Fossum and Garan conducted the third and final spacewalk, replacing an empty nitrogen tank and collecting a sample of debris from the solar array.

=== June 9 (Flight day 10) ===
Kibō's robot arm was extended to its full 33 feet, with all six joints tested. The astronauts also opened the hatch to the Kibō's storage unit.

=== June 10 (Flight day 11) ===
The shuttle closed the hatch connecting it to the space station at 19:49 UTC.

"It's amazing what's going on up here," said Chamitoff. "This is just the beginning. Overall, the mission's been a great success," said Kelly from space. "I certainly have a great crew and they're well trained, but there's also a little luck involved."

=== June 11 (Flight day 12) ===
Discovery undocked from the International Space Station's Harmony Module, at 11:42 UTC. Discovery then conducted a fly-by of the ISS, so pictures could be taken. Saying goodbye to the ISS and its crew, commander Kelly said "We wish them the best with their expedition and we hope we left them a better, more capable space station than when we arrived. Sayonara."

Afterwards the crew of Discovery conducted the late inspection of the shuttle's Thermal Protection System that was unable to be performed as usual on Flight Day 2, due to the size of the Kibō Pressurized Module.

=== June 12 (Flight day 13) ===
Flight day 13 was a rare off-duty day. The only major projects were stowage of the Orbiter Boom Sensor System (OBSS) and an orbit adjustment burn.

During the day, pilot Kenneth Ham conducted an interview with Mike Greenberg and Mike Golic of ESPN, to be aired on their radio show, Mike and Mike in the Morning, the following morning on ESPN Radio and ESPN2.

=== June 13 (Flight day 14) ===
The crew conducted routine testing of the steering jets and an examination of the flight control system. During these tests, a shiny object was noticed trailing the shuttle. This was identified as a thermal clip from the shuttle's rudder speed brake, and should pose no danger during landing.

=== June 14 (Flight day 15, Landing) ===
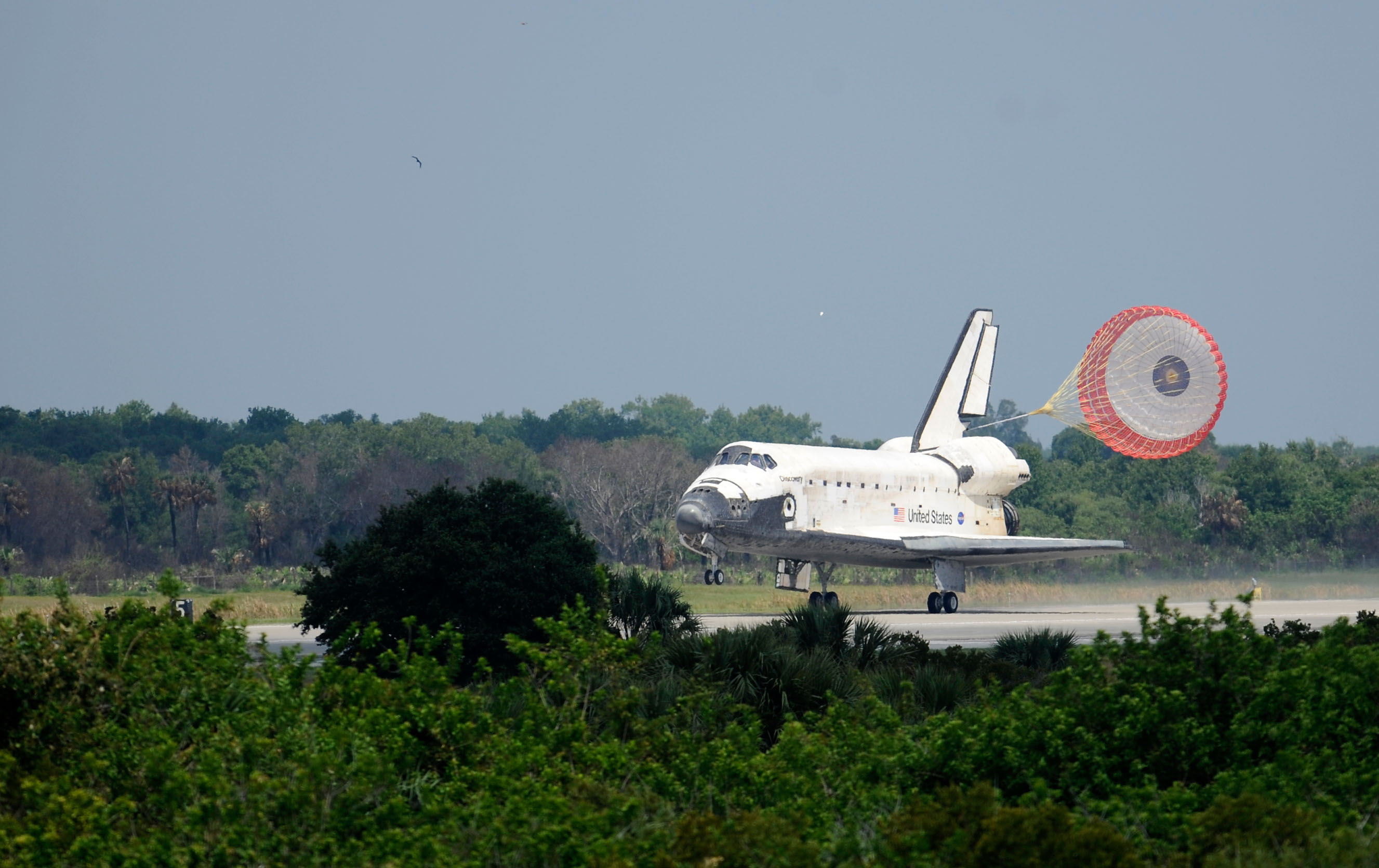
Space Shuttle Discovery lands

The crew worked through their lengthy list of deorbit preparations, which continued for most of the day. They closed the payload bay doors at 11:30 UTC, which took place without incident. All of Discovery's systems were nominal, and with the weather looking very good at KSC the deorbit burn took place on schedule at 14:10 UTC for landing on runway 15 at 15:15 UTC.

At 12:00 UTC, the decision was made to use runway 15 rather than 33. This decision was made based on the sun glare that would be present on the Commander's window as he lined up Discovery with the runway.

== Extra-vehicular activity ==
Three spacewalks were scheduled and completed during STS-124. The cumulative time in extra-vehicular activity during the mission was 20 hours and 32 minutes.

EVA	Spacewalkers	Start (UTC)	End (UTC)	Duration
EVA 1	Ronald J. Garan Jr. Michael E. Fossum	June 3, 2008; 16:22	June 3, 2008; 23:10	6 hours, 48 minutes
EVA 1	Released straps on the shuttle's robotic arm elbow joint camera, transferred the OBSS back to shuttle. Prepared the Japanese Experiment Module, Pressurized Module (JEM-PM), named Kibō, for installation. Replaced a trundle bearing assembly on the starboard Solar Alpha Rotary Joint, and inspected damage on the SARJ.			
EVA 2	Garan; Fossum	June 5, 2008; 15:04	June 5, 2008; 22:15	7 hours, 11 minutes
EVA 2	Installed covers and external equipment to Kibō, prepared for the relocation of ELM-PS. Prepared a nitrogen tank assembly for removal, and the new tank was stowed on an External Stowage Platform to prepare for installation. Removed a television camera with failed power supply.			
EVA 3	Fossum; Garan	June 8, 2008; 13:55	June 8, 2008; 20:28	6 hours, 33 minutes
EVA 3	Removed and replaced the starboard nitrogen tank assembly. Finished outfitting the Kibō laboratory. Reinstalled a television camera with a repaired power supply.			

== Wake-up calls ==
NASA began a tradition of playing music to astronauts during the Gemini program, which was first used to wake up a flight crew during Apollo 15. Each track is specially chosen, often by their families, and usually has a special meaning to an individual member of the crew, or is applicable to their daily activities.

Flight Day	Song	Artist/Composer	Played for	Links
Day 2	Your Wildest Dreams	the Moody Blues	Kenneth Ham	WAV MP3; TRANSCRIPT
Day 3	Away from Home	José Molina Serrano	Greg Chamitoff	WAV MP3; TRANSCRIPT
Day 4	Hold Me with the Robot Arm	Yusuke Hanawa	Akihiko Hoshide	WAV MP3; TRANSCRIPT
Day 5	Have You Ever	Brandi Carlile	Karen Nyberg	WAV MP3; TRANSCRIPT
Day 6	Fly Away	Lenny Kravitz	Ron Garan	WAV MP3; TRANSCRIPT
Day 7	Bright as Yellow	Innocence Mission	Karen Nyberg	WAV MP3; TRANSCRIPT
Day 8	Taking Off	Godiego	Akihiko Hoshide	WAV MP3; TRANSCRIPT
Day 9	The Mickey Mouse Club March		Buzz Lightyear	WAV MP3; TRANSCRIPT
Day 10	The Spirit of Aggieland	Fightin' Texas Aggie Band	Mike Fossum	WAV MP3; TRANSCRIPT
Day 11	All Because of You	U2	Ron Garan	WAV MP3; TRANSCRIPT
Day 12	Centerfield	John Fogerty	Kenneth Ham	WAV MP3; TRANSCRIPT
Day 13	Crystal Frontier	Calexico	Mark Kelly	WAV MP3; TRANSCRIPT
Day 14	Baby, Won't You Please Come Home	Louis Prima and Keely Smith	Garrett Reisman	WAV MP3; TRANSCRIPT
Day 15	Life on an Ocean Wave	the US Merchant Marine Academy Band	Mark Kelly	WAV MP3; TRANSCRIPT

== Contingency mission ==
STS-326 was the designation given to the Contingency Shuttle Crew Support mission which would have been launched in the event that Discovery became disabled during STS-124. It would have been a modified version of the STS-126 mission of Endeavour, which would have involved the launch date being brought forward. The crew for this mission would have been a four-person subset of the full STS-126 crew, namely:

- Christopher Ferguson – Commander
- Eric A. Boe – Pilot
- Stephen G. Bowen – Mission Specialist, extravehicular 2
- Heidemarie Stefanyshyn-Piper – Mission Specialist, extravehicular 1

== Media ==
Space Shuttle Discovery launches on STS-124

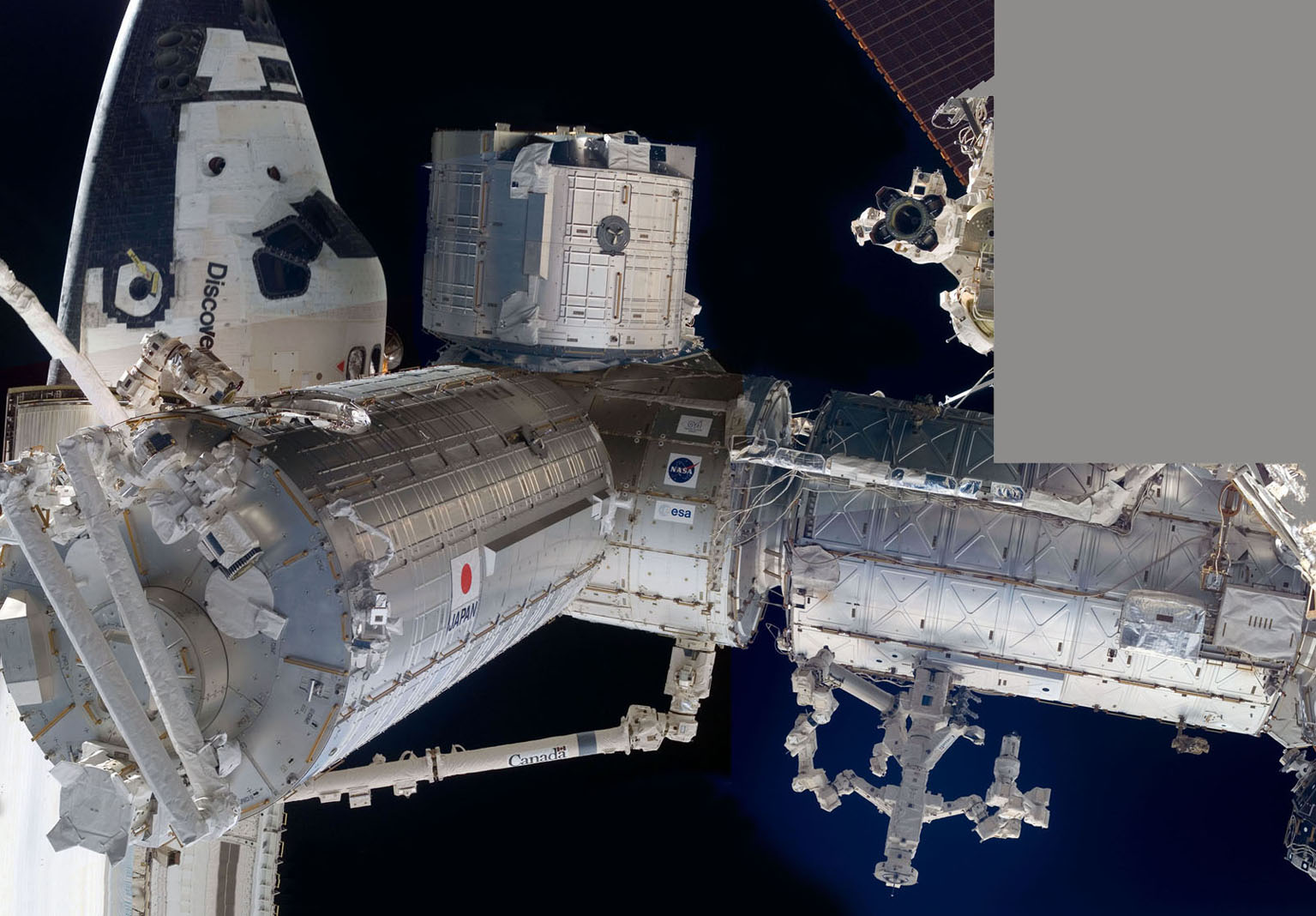
Composite image of the US Segment of the ISS taken during EVA
