= Garrett Reisman =

American astronaut and engineer (born 1968)

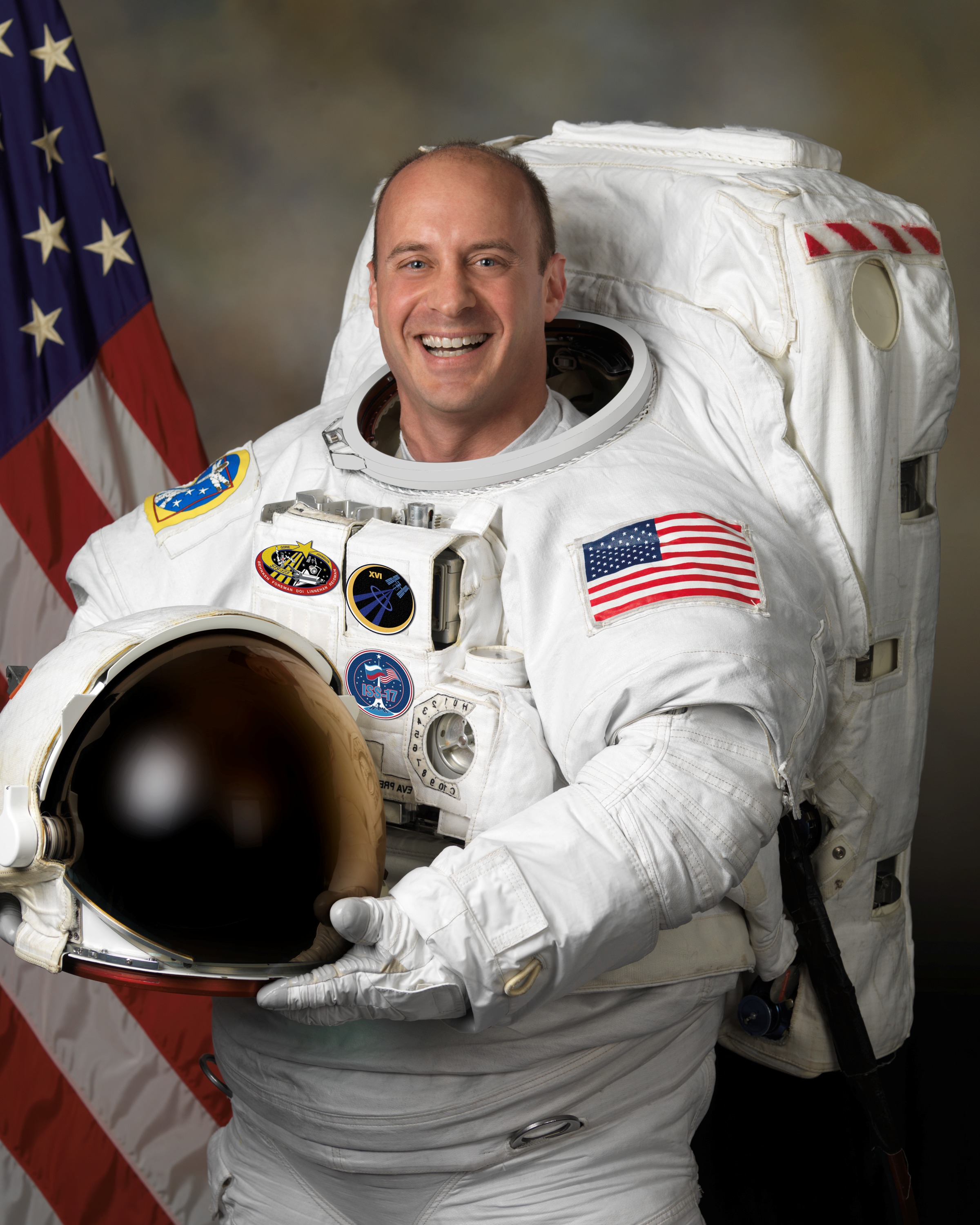
- Reisman in 2007
- Born: Garrett Erin Reisman; February 10, 1968 (age 58); Morristown, New Jersey, U.S.
- Education: University of Pennsylvania (BS); California Institute of Technology (MS, PhD)
- Space career

NASA astronaut
- Time in space: 107d 3h 15m
- Selection: NASA Group 17 (1998)
- Total EVAs: 3
- Total EVA time: 21h 21m
- Missions: STS-123/124 (Expedition 16/17); STS-132
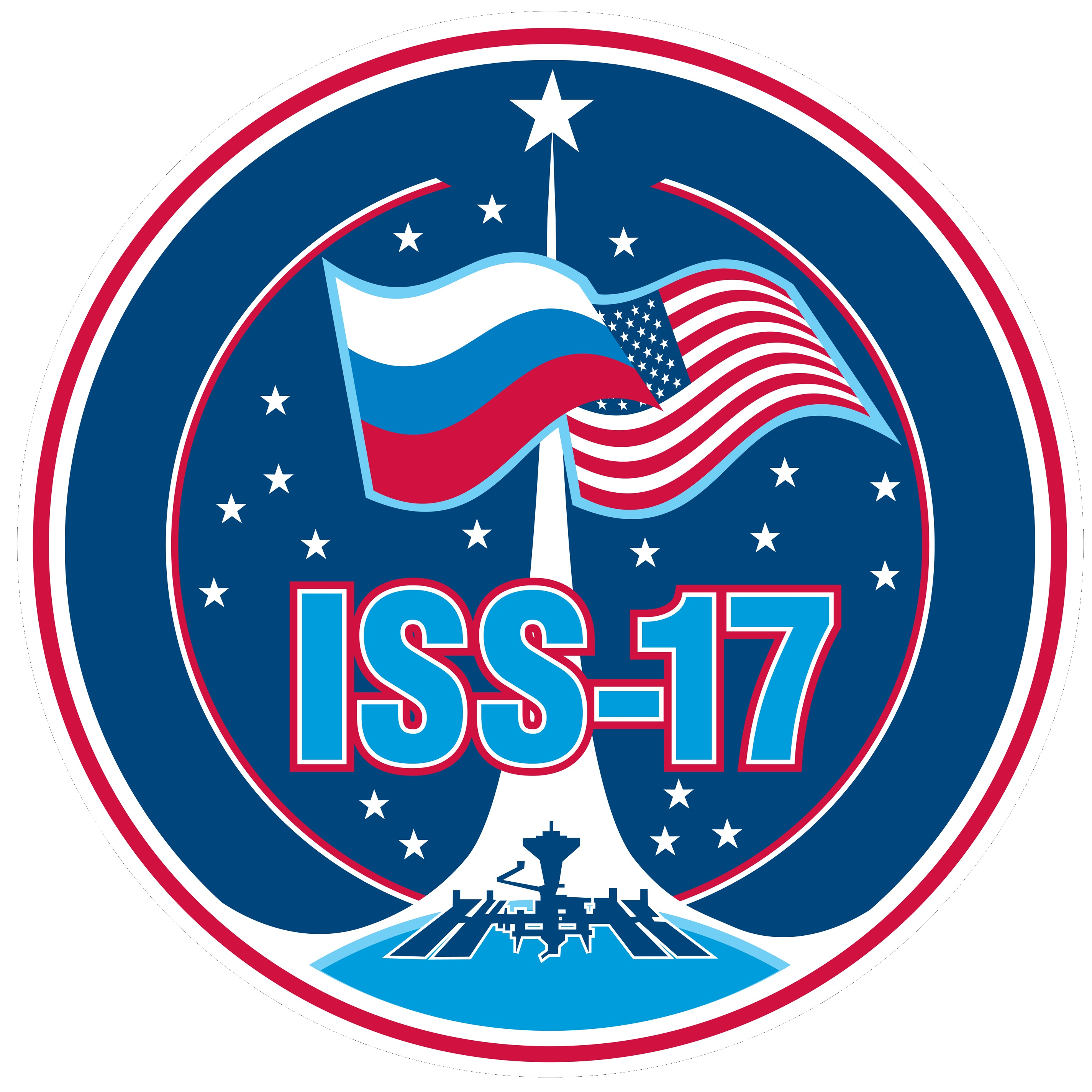
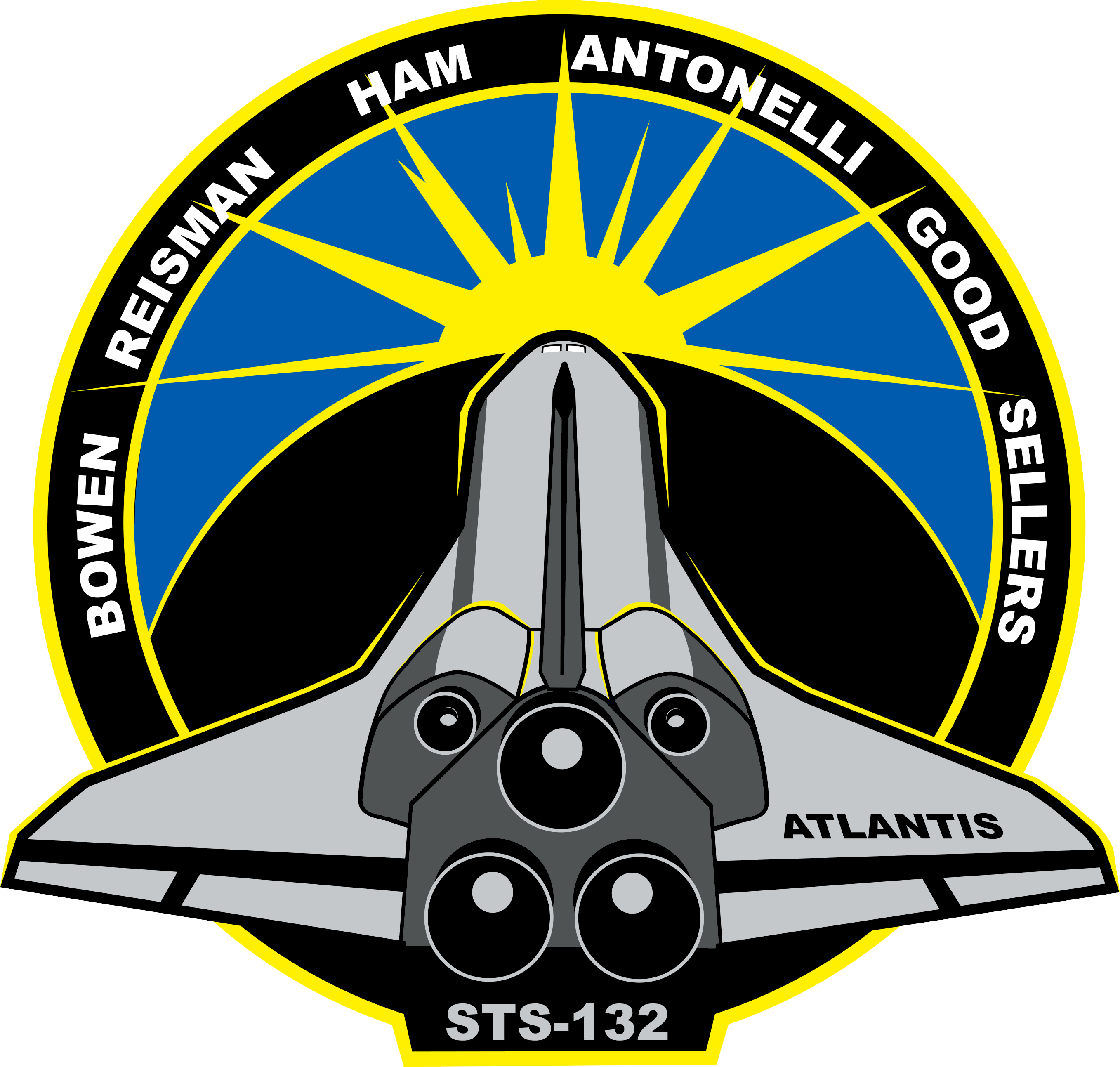
- Mission insignia
- Scientific career
- Fields: Mechanical engineering
- Thesis: Dynamics, Acoustics and Control of Cloud Cavitation on Hydrofoils (1997)
- Doctoral advisor: Christopher Brennen

Garrett Erin Reisman (/ˈriːsmən/; born February 10, 1968) is an American engineer and former NASA astronaut. He was a backup crew member for Expedition 15 and joined Expedition 16 aboard the International Space Station for a short time before becoming a member of Expedition 17. He returned to Earth on June 14, 2008 on board STS-124 on Space Shuttle Discovery. He was a member of the STS-132 mission that traveled to the International Space Station aboard Space Shuttle Atlantis from May 14 to 26, 2010. He is a consultant at SpaceX and a Professor of Astronautics Practice at the University of Southern California's Viterbi School of Engineering.

== Biography ==
Reisman was born in Morristown, New Jersey to a Jewish family. After graduating from Parsippany High School in 1986, he went to the Jerome Fisher Program of Management & Technology, a dual degree program between Wharton School and the School of Engineering and Applied Science at the University of Pennsylvania, where he respectively earned a B.S. degree in economics, as well in mechanical engineering & applied mechanics, both in 1991. He subsequently attended the California Institute of Technology (Caltech), where he received an M.S. degree in 1992 and a Ph.D. in 1997, both in mechanical engineering. While at Caltech he shared a doctoral advisor, Christopher E. Brennan, with another future NASA astronaut, Bob Behnken. Later both astronauts would launch on their first flights into space together on STS-123.

== NASA career ==
In June 2003, Reisman served as an aquanaut during the NEEMO 5 mission aboard the Aquarius underwater laboratory, living and working under water for fourteen days.

=== Expedition 16/17 ===
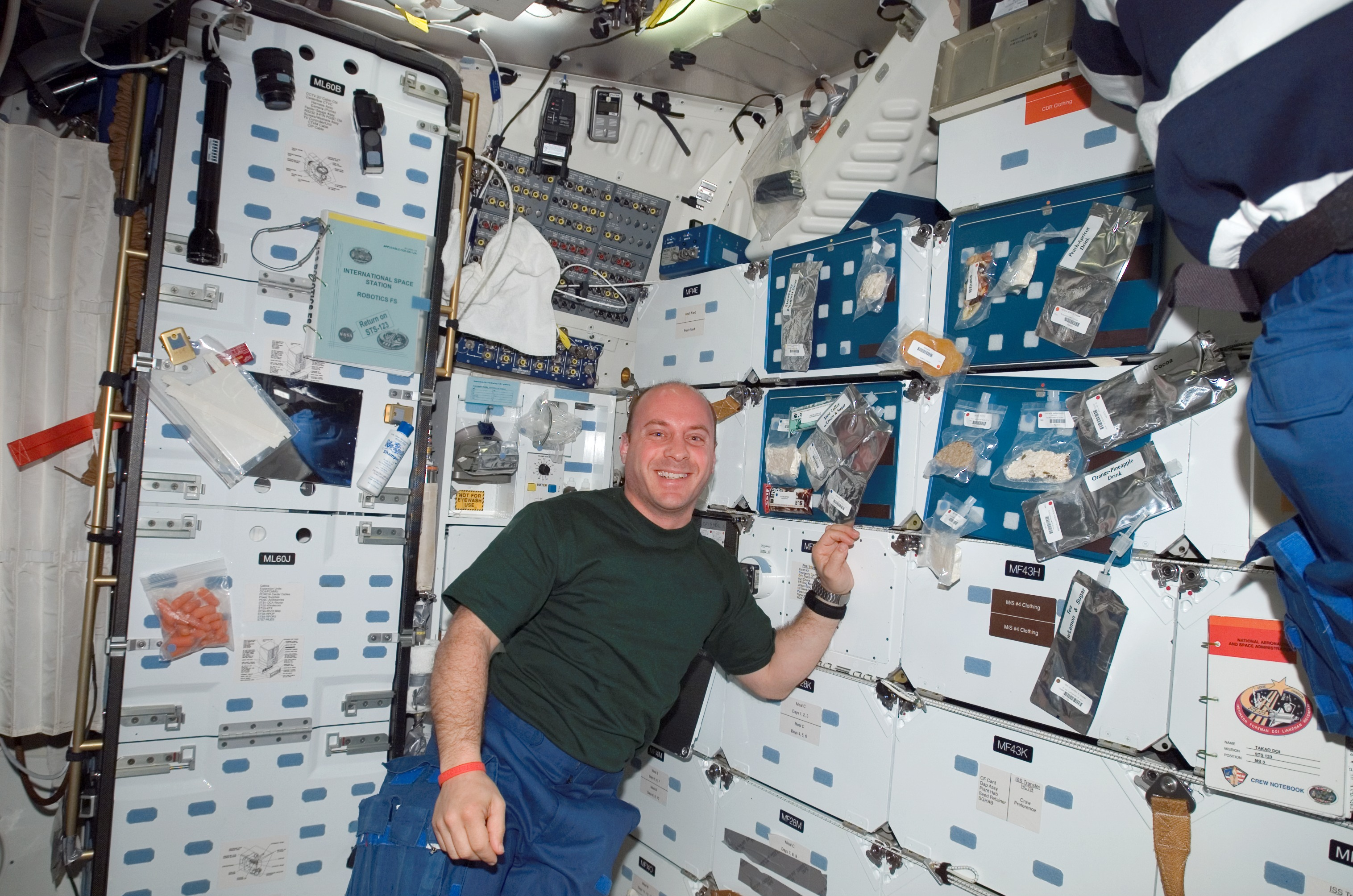
Garrett Reisman on the mid-deck of Space Shuttle Endeavour during STS-123

Reisman was assigned as a long duration crewmember on the International Space Station. He launched as Mission Specialist 5 aboard the STS-123 (Space Shuttle Endeavour) mission on March 11, 2008. After docking, he took part in the first spacewalk of the mission. Reisman stayed on board as flight engineer 2 for part of Expedition 16 and part of Expedition 17. Having completed his mission, he returned to Earth as mission specialist 5 aboard STS-124 on June 14, 2008. During his time on board the ISS he had seen two visiting Space Shuttles and the installation of the Special Purpose Dexterous Manipulator (SPDM) and the pressurized section of the Japanese Experiment Module "Kibo".

Reisman was the first Jewish crew member on the International Space Station. He sent a greeting from space to the people of Israel during the celebration of Israel's 60th Independence Day in May 2008. He also did an entertaining, high-definition video of "A day in the life of a space station crew member" while on board, and demonstrated in the large – and at the time empty – Kibo section that humans cannot "swim" in the microgravity of orbital space.

=== STS-132 ===
Reisman was a member of the STS-132 mission that traveled to the International Space Station aboard Space Shuttle Atlantis from May 14 to 26, 2010. He participated in two spacewalks during this mission.

=== Post-NASA career ===
On March 4, 2011, SpaceX announced that Reisman would be joining the company as a senior engineer working on astronaut safety and mission assurance. He was later promoted to director of crew operations. On May 31, 2018, Reisman announced he would leave his position at SpaceX, but remain as a "consultant," stating he could not pass up a job to teach human spaceflight at the nearby University of Southern California. In July 2023, Reisman joined Vast, a space station company, as Astronaut Advisor. Reisman left his role as Senior Advisor at SpaceX in 2024.

== In popular culture ==
A self-proclaimed member of the "Colbert Universe", Reisman was interviewed live from space on the May 8, 2008 episode of The Colbert Report after being seen wearing a "WristStrong" bracelet. On July 24, 2008, after returning to Earth, Reisman appeared in person on The Colbert Report as that night's featured guest. Reisman presented Stephen Colbert with the WristStrong bracelet he had worn while in space. Reisman appeared on the final episode of The Colbert Report.

Reisman filmed a cameo appearance as a Colonial Marine for the series finale episode of Battlestar Galactica. Space.com reported that his scene, in which "someone throws up on him and then he dies", might not be in the final edit of the episode which aired March 20, 2009.

In the podcast for the final (as aired) episode, producer Ron Moore confirmed that one of the people seen in the background of a scene where a Raptor arms its nuclear payload (shortly before being destroyed) was Reisman.

In July 2019 it was reported that producer Ron Moore had created his alternative reality series For All Mankind after he and Reisman had discussed the possibility of a timeline in which the Soviet Union landed people on the Moon before the US. Reisman also served as technical advisor for the show, and guest appeared as Commander of a Moon Space Shuttle in season 2, episode 2.

Reisman appeared on The Joe Rogan Experience on February 8, 2020.

Reisman was a childhood classmate of actress Jane Krakowski. In May 2010, Krakowski said on The Tonight Show with Jay Leno that she and Reisman exchanged e-mails while he was in space on Space Shuttle Atlantis. At the request of the crew, many of whom were 30 Rock fans, Krakowski provided an autographed script of the show which was brought into space.
