= Expedition 17 =

17th expedition to the International Space Station

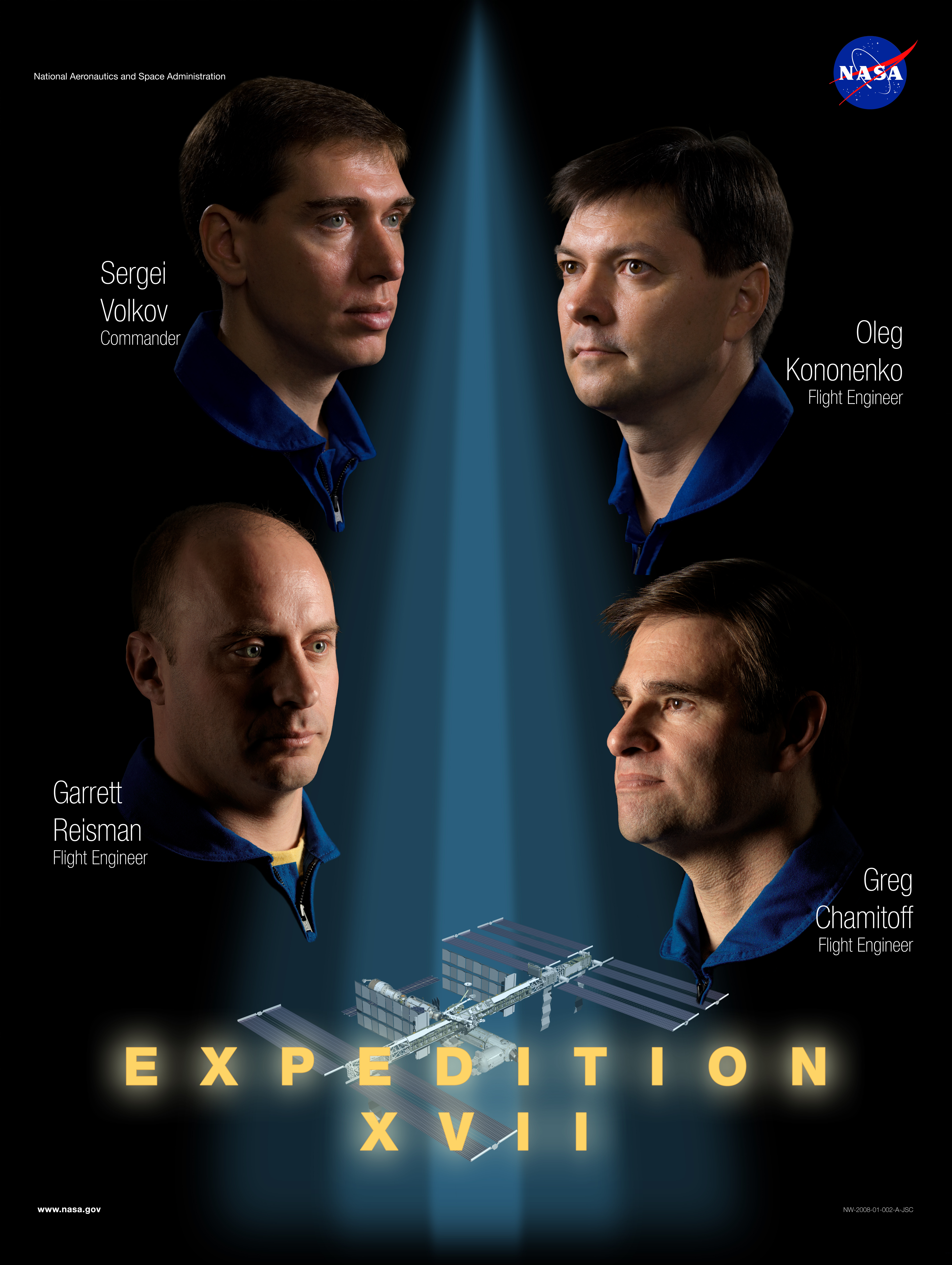
- Promotional Poster
- Mission type: Long-duration expedition

Expedition
- Space station: International Space Station
- Began: 8 April 2008
- Ended: 24 October 2008
- Arrived aboard: Soyuz TMA-12; Reisman: STS-123; Space Shuttle Endeavour; Chamitoff: STS-124; Space Shuttle Discovery
- Departed aboard: Soyuz TMA-12; Reisman: STS-124; Space Shuttle Discovery; Chamitoff: STS-126; Space Shuttle Endeavour

Crew
- Crew size: 3
- Members: Sergey Volkov*; Oleg Kononenko; Garrett Reisman* (to June); Gregory Chamitoff† (from June) * – transferred from Expedition 16 † – transferred to Expedition 18
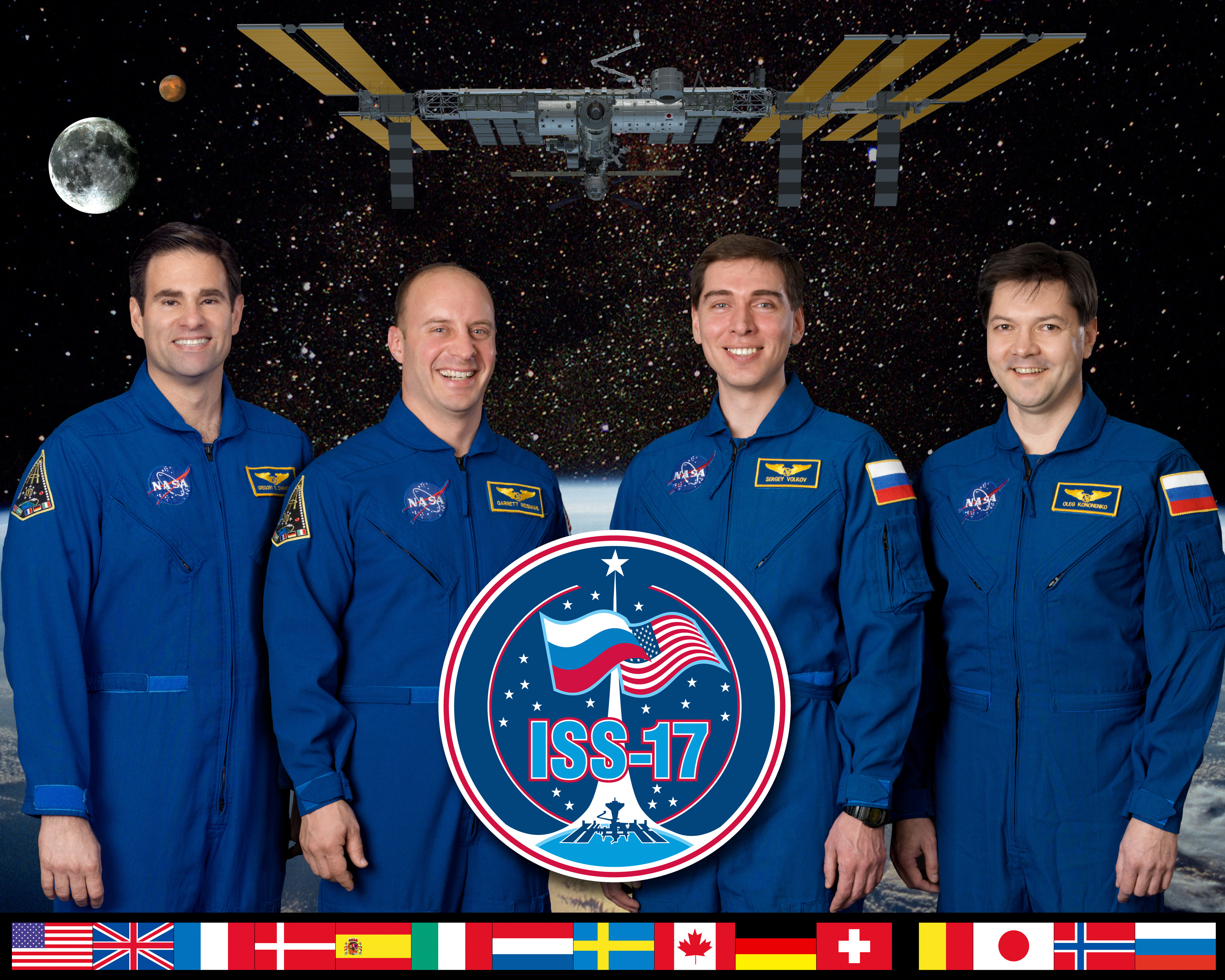
- Expedition 17 mission patch (Left to right) Greg Chamitoff, Garrett Reisman, Sergei Volkov, Oleg Kononenko ISS expeditions

Expedition 17 was the 17th expedition to the International Space Station (ISS). The first two crew members, Sergey Volkov and Oleg Kononenko, were launched on 8 April 2008, aboard the Soyuz TMA-12. Once aboard the station, they joined Garrett Reisman, who transferred from Expedition 16 to join the Expedition 17 crew.

Reisman was replaced by Gregory Chamitoff, who launched aboard the Space Shuttle Discovery mission STS-124 on 31 May 2008. Volkov and Kononenko landed safely on 24 October 2008, while Chamitoff remained aboard the station as an Expedition 18 crewmember.

== Crew ==
Position	First Part (April 2008 to June 2008)	Second Part (June 2008 to October 2008)
Commander	Sergey Volkov, RSA; First spaceflight Soyuz TMA-12 commander	
Flight Engineer 1	Oleg Kononenko, RSA; First spaceflight	
Flight Engineer 2	Garrett Reisman, NASA; First spaceflight	Gregory Chamitoff, NASA; First spaceflight

- Sergei Volkov, 35, was the youngest person to command the ISS.
- Garrett Reisman was the first Jewish resident of the ISS.
- Gregory Chamitoff was the first crewmember to take bagels with him to the station; three bags of 18 sesame seed bagels.
- Reisman launched to the station on STS-123 in March, which was during the Expedition 16 spaceflight. He landed on STS-124.
- Chamitoff launched to the station on STS-124 in June, and stayed through Expedition 18, leaving the station on STS-126 in November.

=== Backup crew ===
- Maksim Surayev – Commander – RSA (for Volkov)
- Oleg Skripochka – Flight Engineer – RSA (for Kononenko)
- Timothy Kopra – Flight Engineer – NASA (for Chamitoff)
