= Gregory Chamitoff =

Canadian born engineer and NASA astronaut (born 1962)

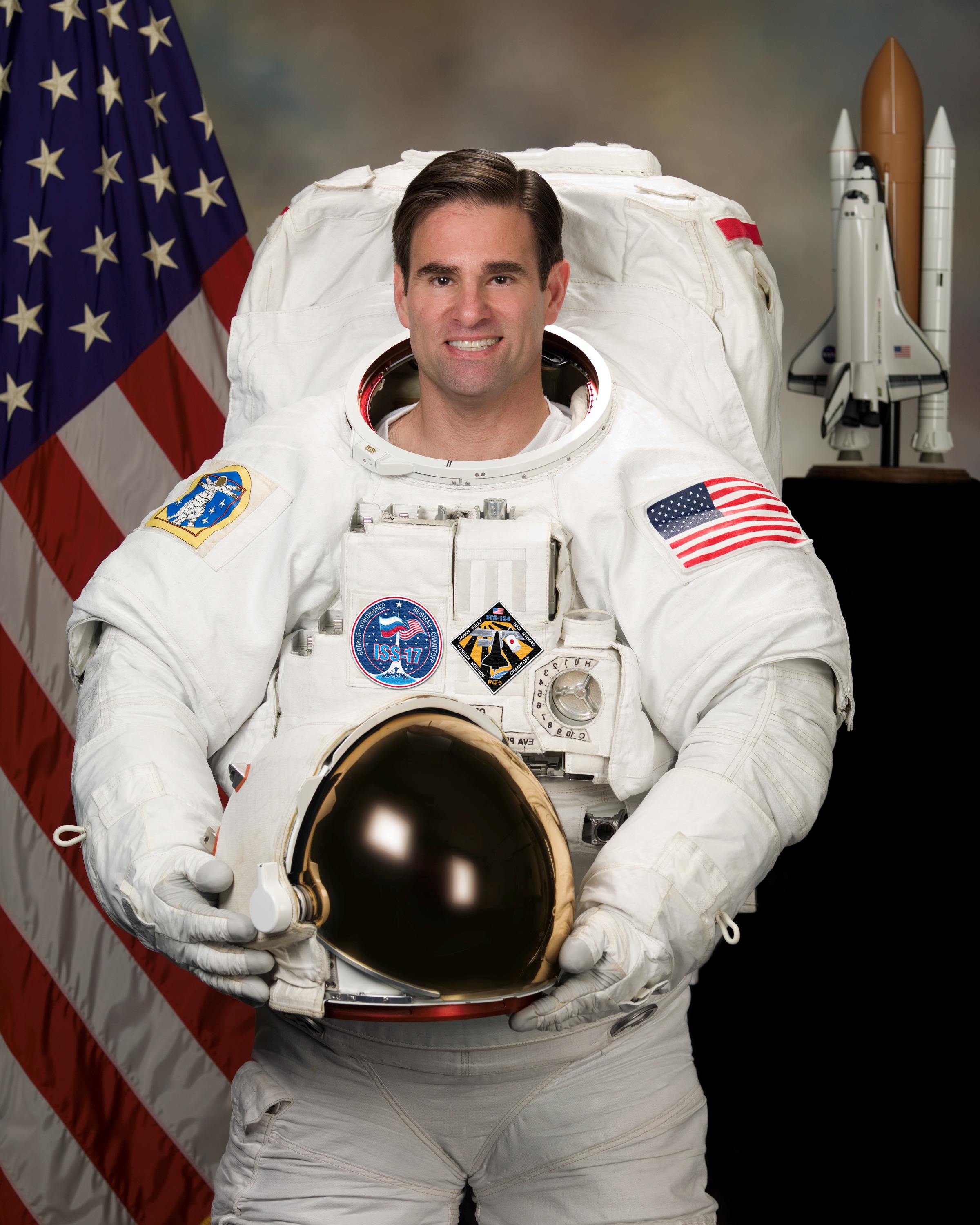
- Born: Gregory Errol Chamitoff; 6 August 1962 (age 64); Montreal, Quebec, Canada
- Education: California Polytechnic State University, San Luis Obispo (BS); California Institute of Technology (MS); Massachusetts Institute of Technology (PhD); University of Houston–Clear Lake (MS)
- Space career

NASA astronaut
- Time in space: 198d 18h 2m
- Selection: NASA Group 17 (1998)
- Total EVAs: 2
- Total EVA time: 13h, 43m
- Missions: STS-124/126 (Expedition 17/18); STS-134
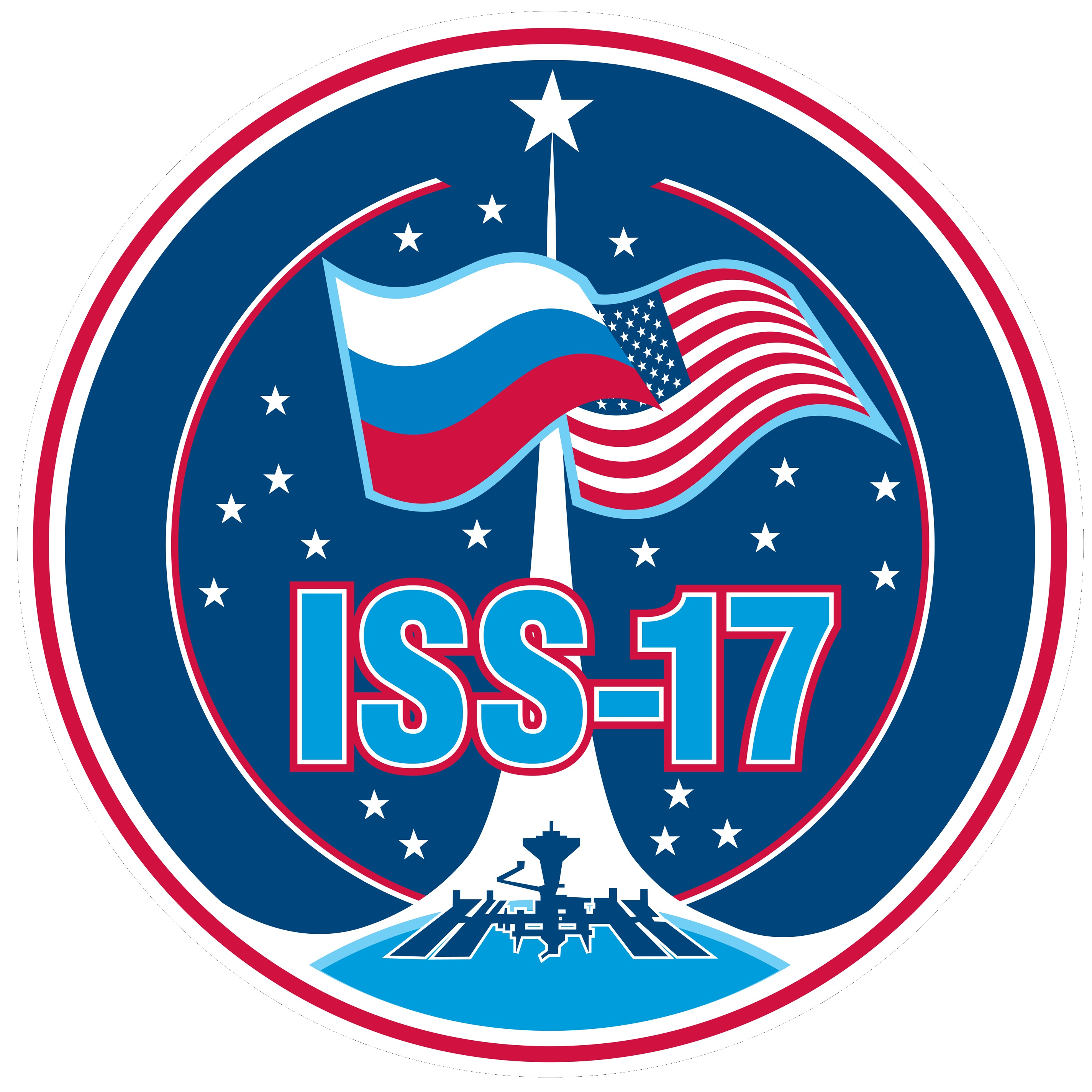
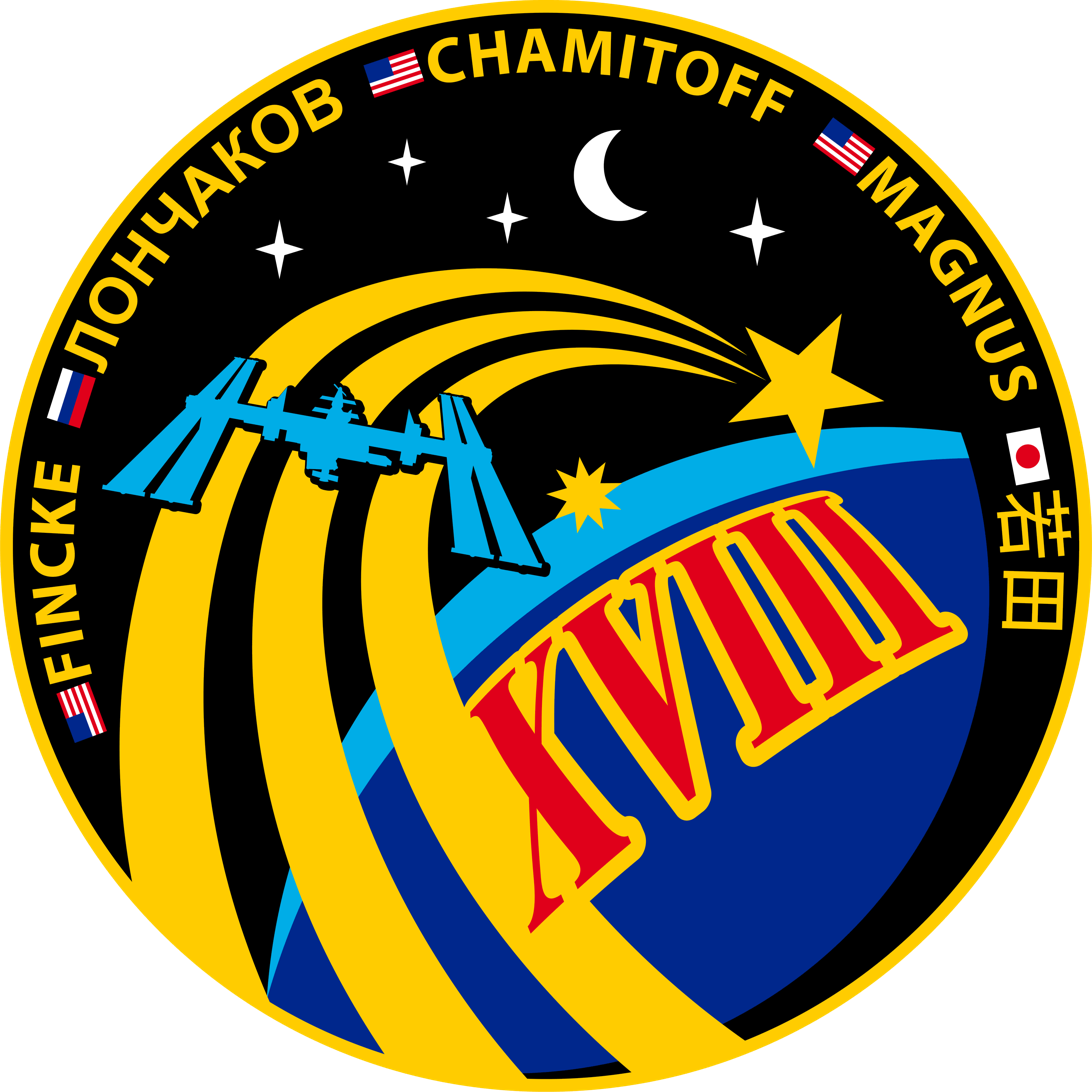
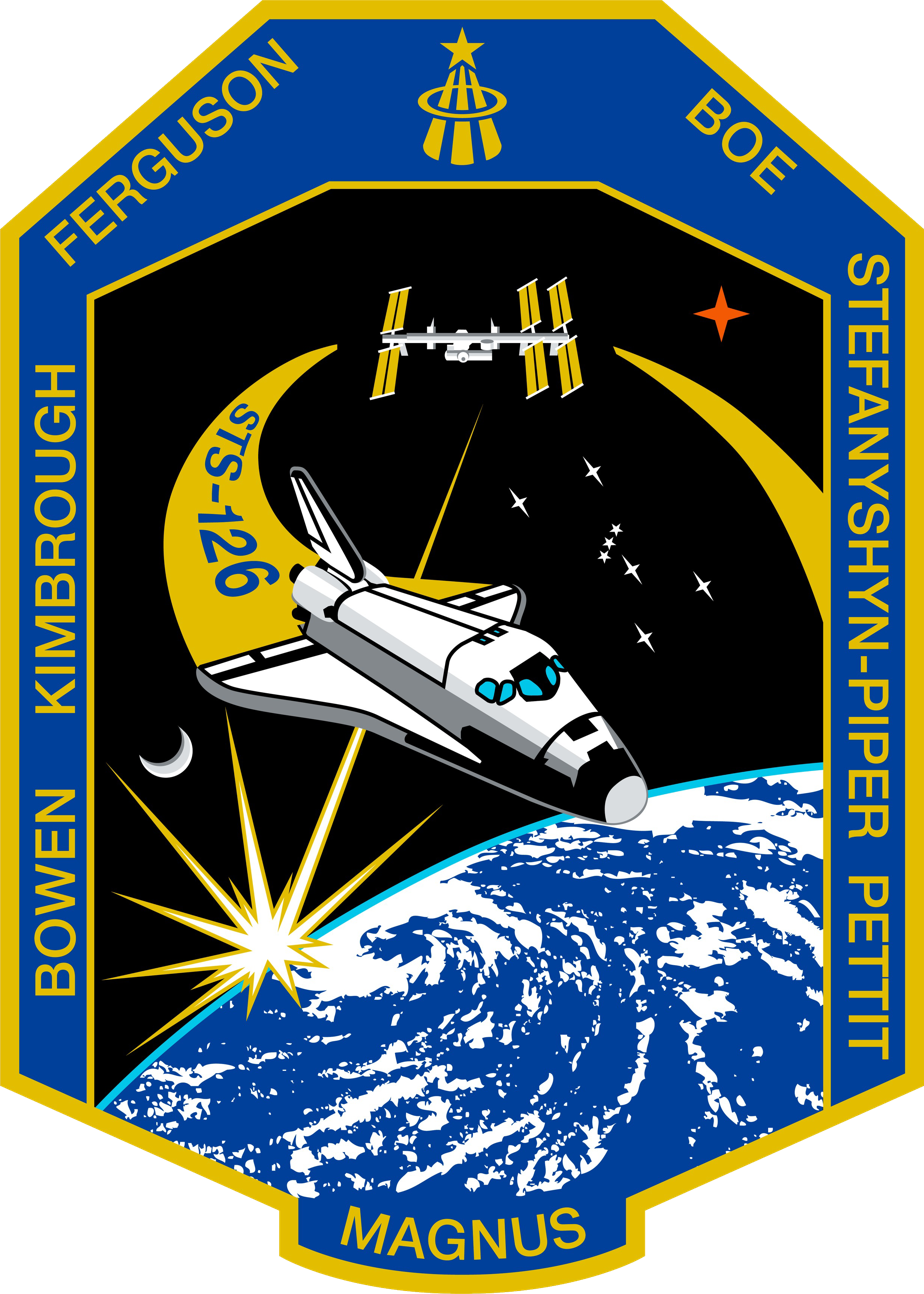
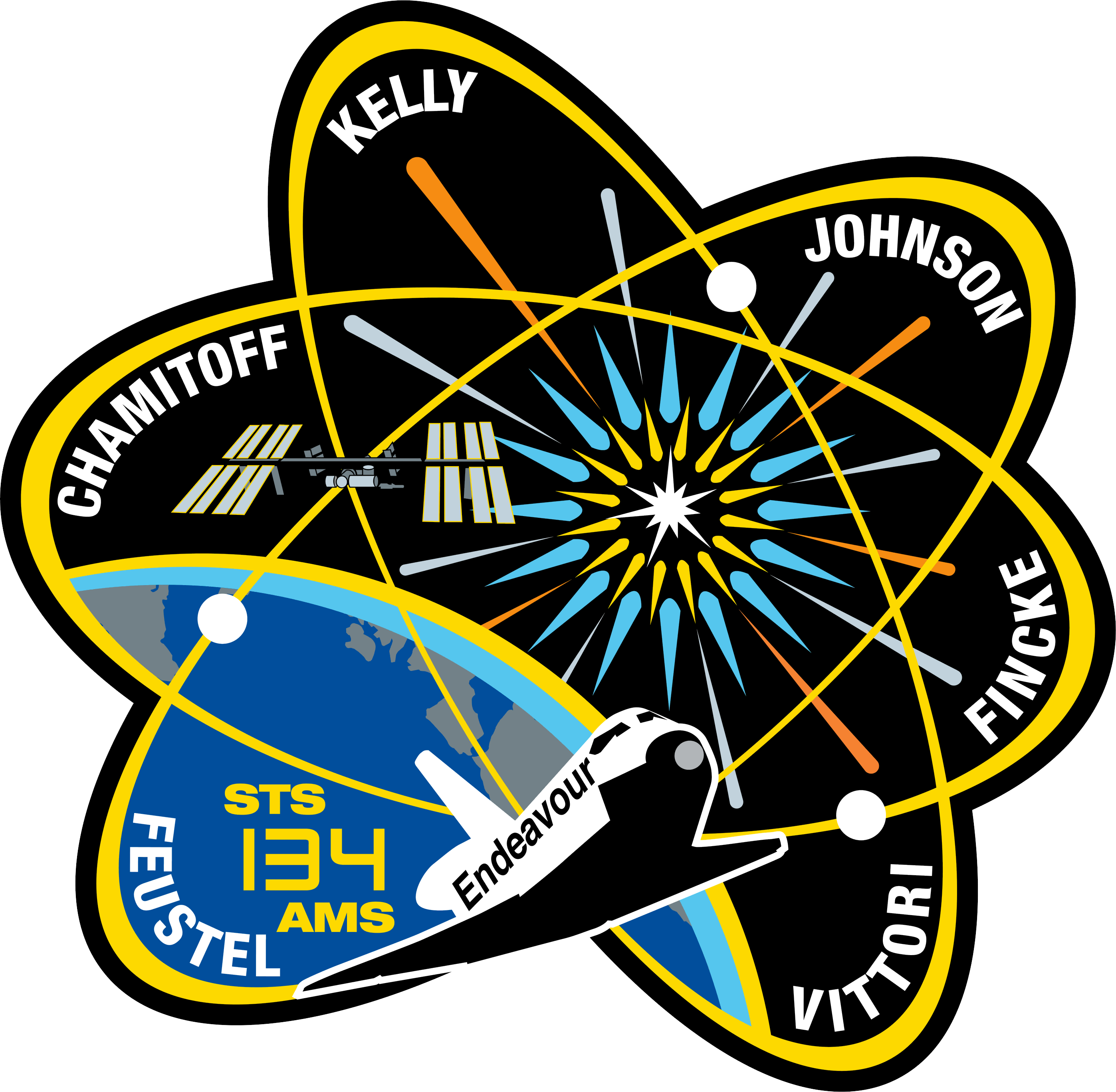
- Mission insignia
- Scientific career
- Fields: Aeronautics
- Thesis: Robust Intelligent Flight Control for Hypersonic Vehicles (1992)

Gregory Errol Chamitoff (born 6 August 1962) is a Canadian-born American engineer and former NASA astronaut. He has been to space twice, spending 6 months aboard the ISS across Expedition 17 and 18 in 2008, and another 15 days as part of STS-134 in 2011. STS-134 was the last flight of Space Shuttle Endeavour which delivered the Alpha Magnetic Spectrometer and completed the US Orbital Segment.

== Early life and education ==
Chamitoff was born 6 August 1962 in Montreal, Quebec, Canada. He was inspired to become an astronaut after watching the Apollo 11 Moon landing at the age of six.

His education includes:

- Blackford High School, San Jose, California, 1980.
- B.S., Electrical Engineering, California Polytechnic State University, 1984.
- M.S., Aeronautical Engineering, California Institute of Technology, 1985.
- Ph.D., Aeronautics and Astronautics, Massachusetts Institute of Technology, 1992.
- M.S., Physical Sciences (Space Science), University of Houston–Clear Lake, 2002.

== Early career ==
As an undergraduate student at Cal Poly, Chamitoff taught lab courses in circuit design and worked summer internships at Four Phase Systems, Atari Computers, Northern Telecom, and IBM. He developed a self-guided robot for his undergraduate thesis project. While at MIT and Draper Labs (1985–1992), Chamitoff worked on several NASA projects. He performed stability analyses for the deployment of the Hubble Space Telescope, designed flight control upgrades for the Space Shuttle autopilot, and worked on the attitude control system for Space Station Freedom. His doctoral thesis developed a new approach for robust intelligent flight control of hypersonic vehicles.

From 1993 to 1995, Chamitoff was a visiting professor at the University of Sydney, Australia, where he led a research group in the development of autonomous flight vehicles, and taught courses in flight dynamics and control. He has published numerous papers on aircraft and spacecraft guidance and control, trajectory optimization, and Mars mission design.

== NASA career ==
In 1995, Chamitoff joined the Motion Control Systems Group in the Mission Operations Directorate at the Johnson Space Center, where he developed software applications for spacecraft attitude control monitoring, prediction, analysis, and maneuver optimization.

Selected by NASA for the Astronaut Class of 1998, Chamitoff started training in August 1998 and qualified for flight assignment as a mission specialist in 2000. He worked in the Space Station Robotics branch, was lead CAPCOM for ISS Expedition 9, acted as crew support astronaut for ISS Expedition 6, and helped develop onboard procedures and displays for Space Station system operations.

In July 2002, Chamitoff was a crew-member on the Aquarius undersea research habitat for 9 days as part of the NEEMO 3 mission (NASA Extreme Environment Mission Operations).

He served as the backup Expedition 15/16 Flight Engineer 2 and STS-117/STS-120 Mission Specialist 5 for Clayton Anderson.

=== Expedition 17 and 18 ===
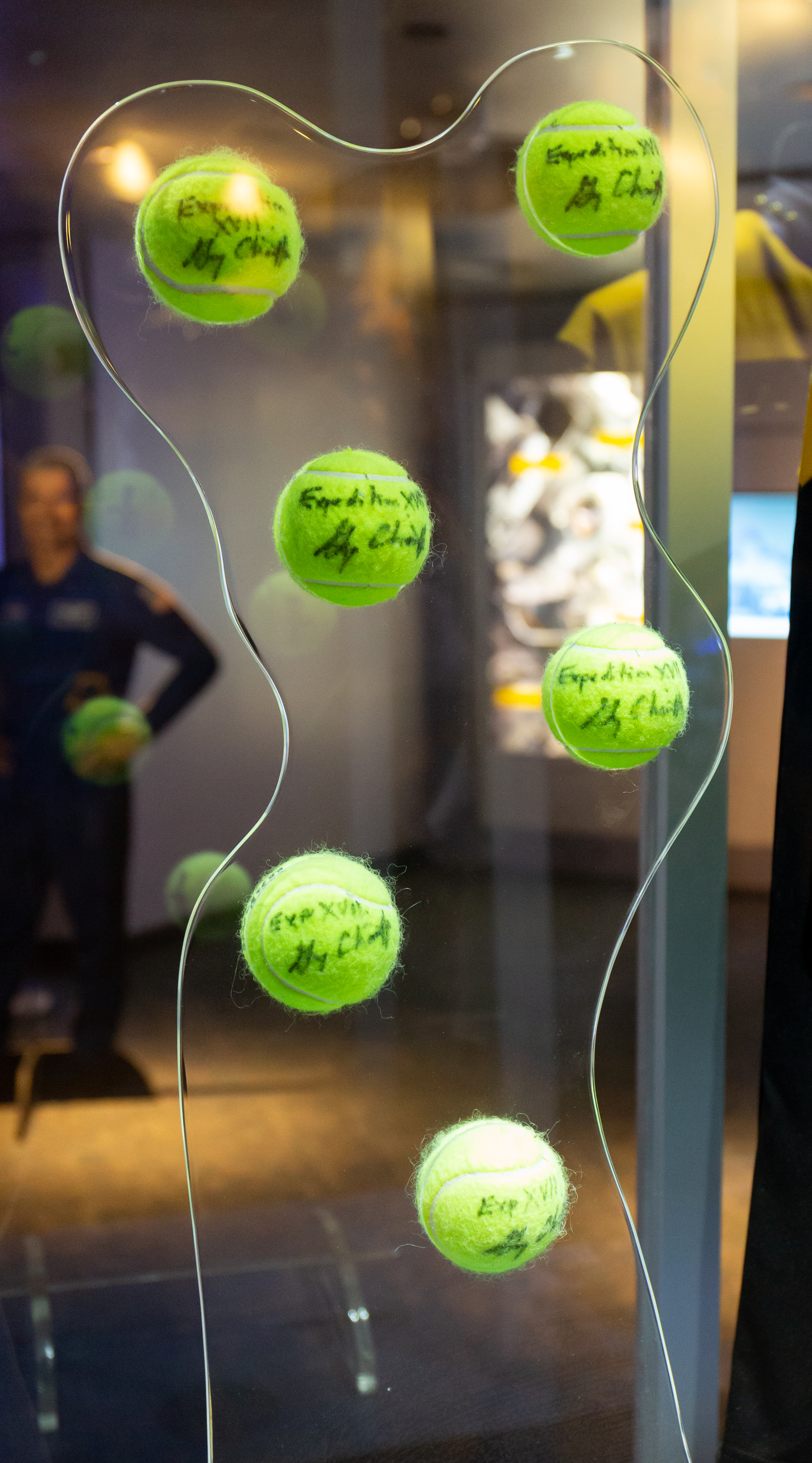
Tennis balls that Chamitoff and Garriott juggled while aboard the ISS

Chamitoff served on a long-duration mission to the International Space Station. He launched as a mission specialist on board Space Shuttle mission STS-124. He was flight engineer 2 and science officer on Expedition 17. He returned home as a mission specialist on STS-126, completing a tour that lasted six months.

As part of his personal allowance, Chamitoff brought the first bagels into space, 3 bags (18 sesame seed bagels) of Fairmount Bagels with him, from his cousin's bagel bakery. He also bought a velcro chess set and started playing games against mission control, which got quite competitive. In 2008, Chamitoff voted from outer space.

While Richard Garriott was aboard the ISS at the beginning of Expedition 18, Chamitoff and Garriott filmed the first magic show in space, and along with Yury Lonchakov, Michael Fincke and Richard Garriott, filmed a science-fiction movie made in space, Apogee of Fear.

After conducting experiments with the SPHERES during his mission, he founded the Zero Robotics competition, where high school students program the robots.

=== STS-134 ===
Chamitoff served as a mission specialist on STS-134, the penultimate Space Shuttle mission, during which he made two spacewalks, the last of which completed the construction of the ISS.

== Gallery ==
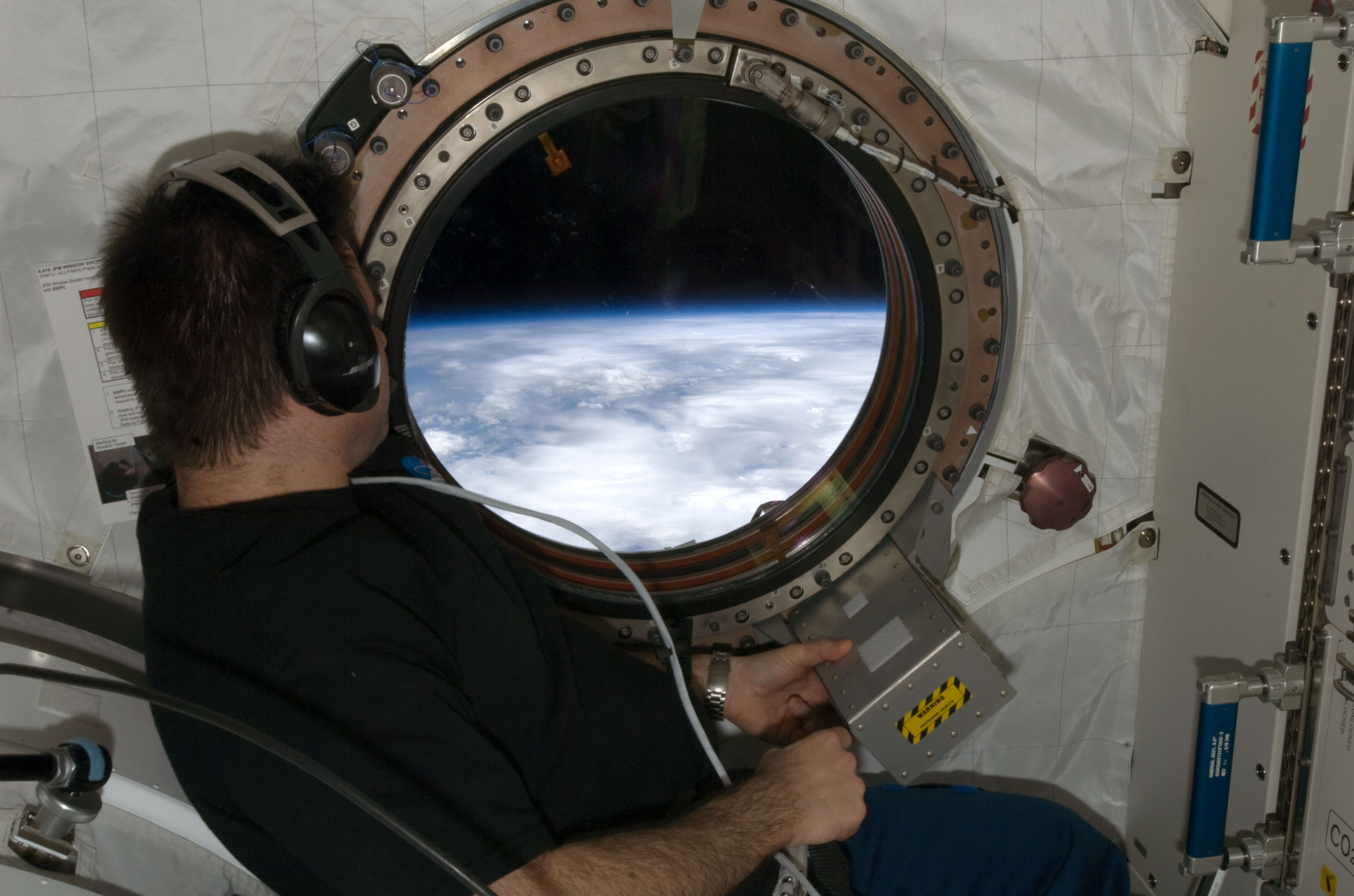
Gregory Chamitoff on the International Space Station (ISS), early November 2008.

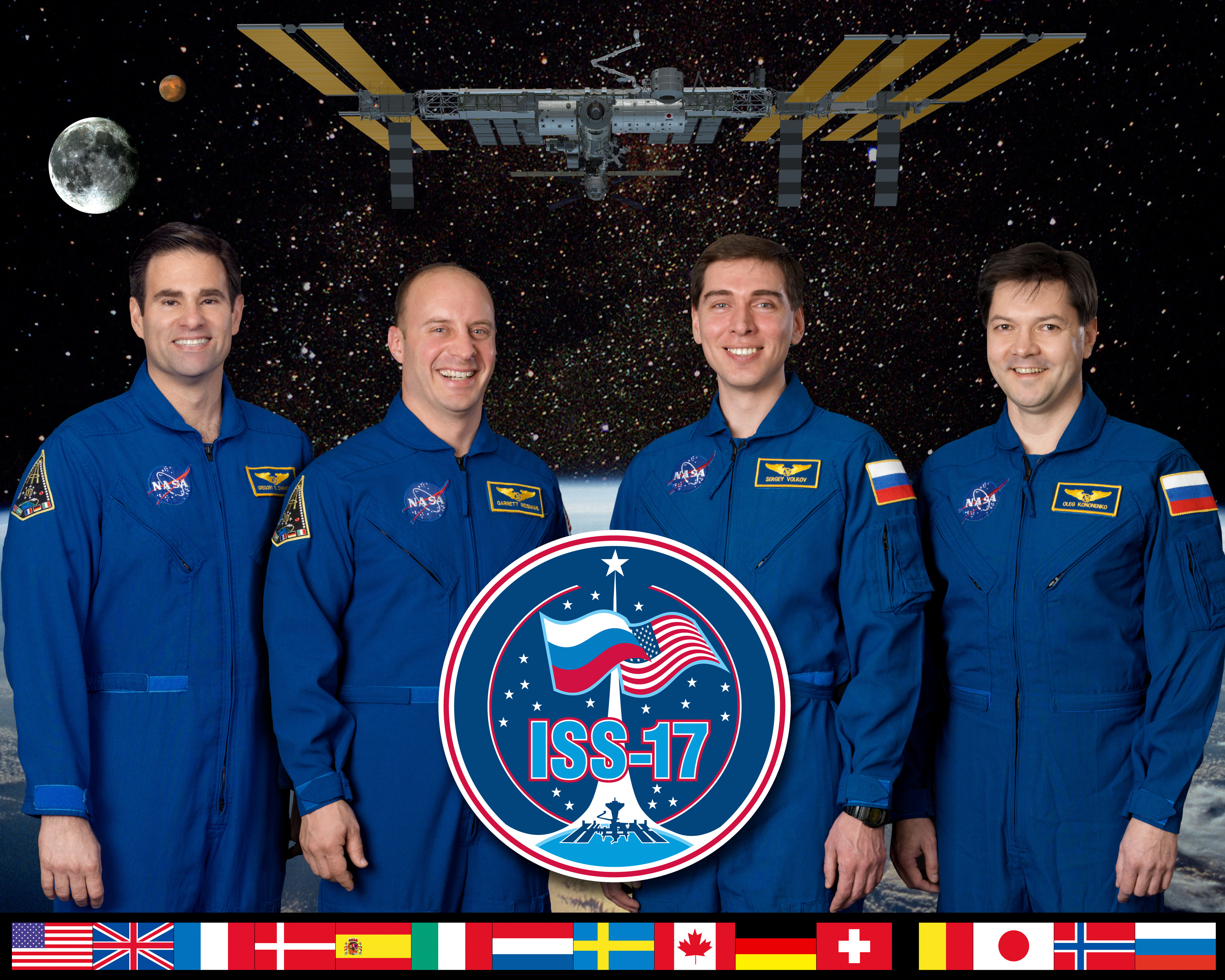
Expedition 17 crew portrait B

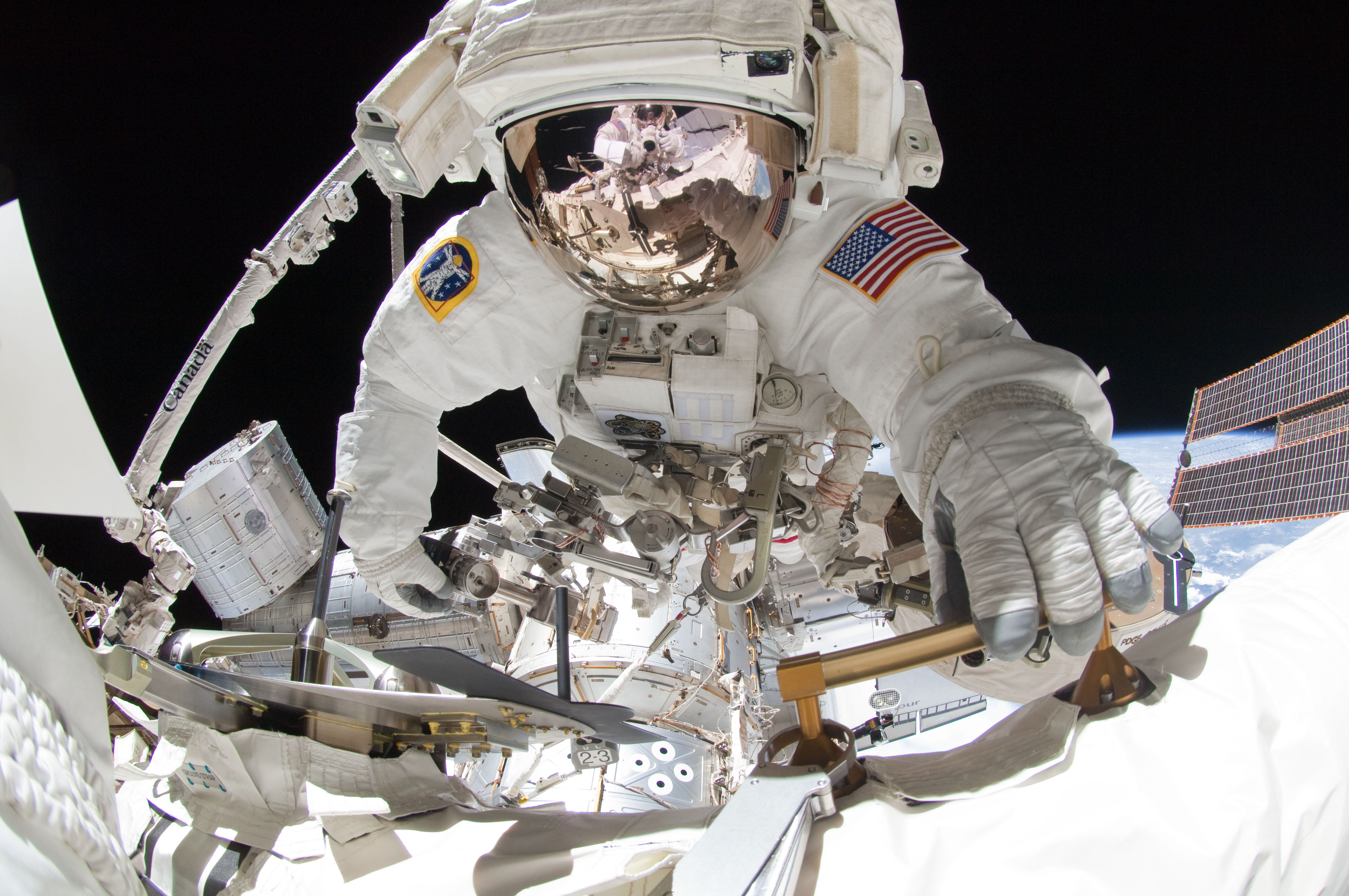
Chamitoff during the final spacewalk of the STS-134 mission.

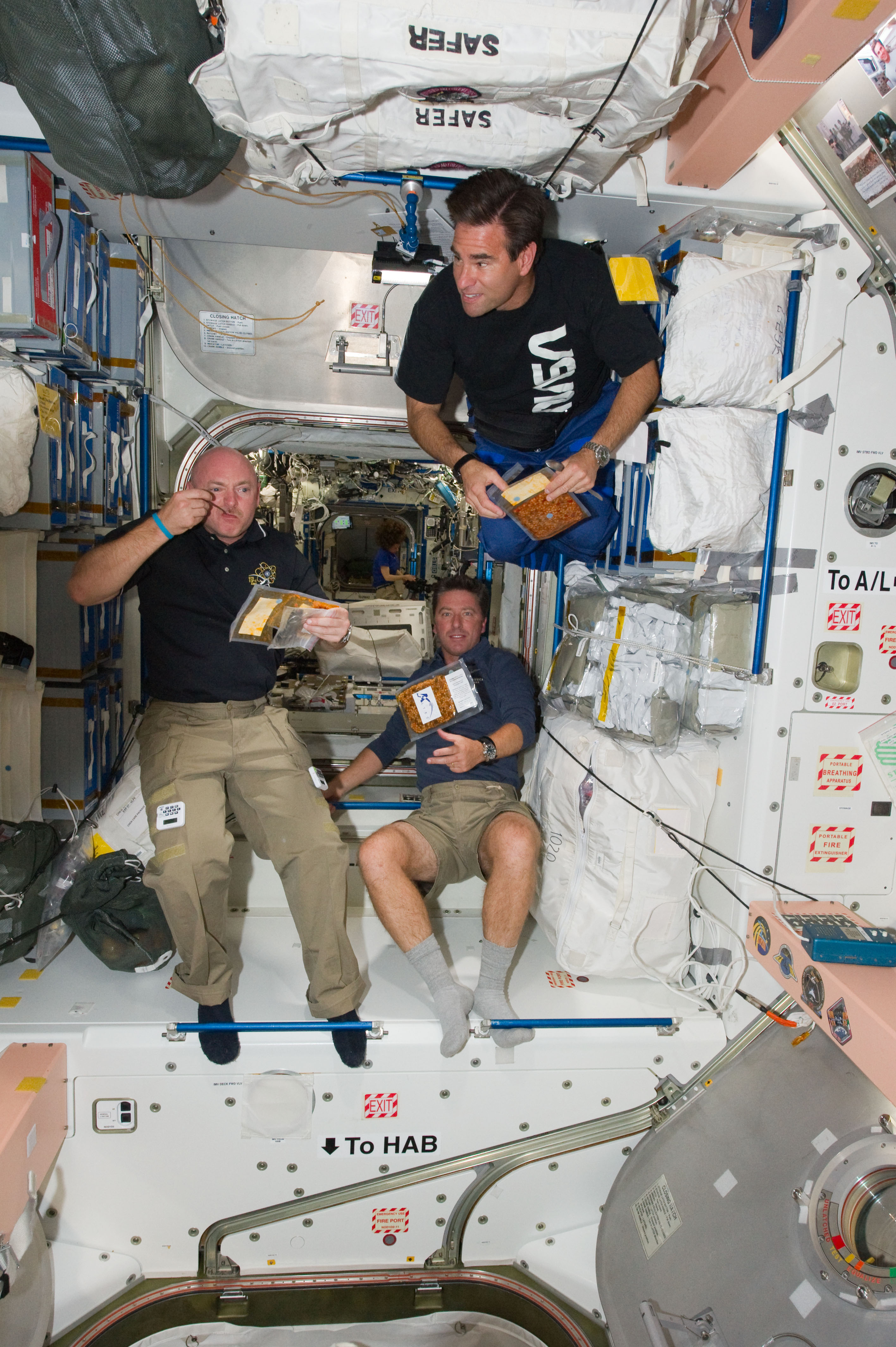
STS-134 Mark Kelly, Roberto Vittori and Greg Chamitoff during a break in the Unity node

== Post-NASA career ==
Chamitoff is currently a professor of Engineering Practice in the Aerospace Engineering Department at Texas A&M University in College Station, Texas. He instructs senior design, human spaceflight operations, and dynamics and controls for aerospace vehicles. Chamitoff has also served as the Lawrence Hargrave Professor of Aeronautical Engineering at the University of Sydney, Australia.

== Awards and honors ==
Chamitoff has received the following honors and awards:

- California Astronaut Hall of Fame
- NASA Distinguished Service Medal
- NASA Exceptional Service Medal
- NASA Space Flight Medal
- Honored Alumnus CalPoly
- AIAA Associate Fellow
- AIAA Technical Excellence Award
- NASA Silver Snoopy award
- NASA/USA Space Flight Awareness Award
- C.S. Draper Laboratory Graduate Fellowship
- IEEE Graduate Fellowship
- Tau Beta Pi Honor Society Fellowship
- Phi Kappa Phi Honor Society
- Eta Kappa Nu Honor Society
- Applied Magnetics Scholarships
- Academic Excellence Award
- Most Outstanding Senior Award
- Degree of Excellence and California Statewide Speech Finalist
- Eagle Scout.

== Personal life ==
Chamitoff is married to Alison Chantal Caviness, M.D., M.P.H., Ph.D. They have two children.

Chamitoff's recreational interests include scuba diving, backpacking, flying, skiing, racquetball, Aikido, juggling, magic and guitar. He is a certified divemaster and instrument rated pilot. Chamitoff also enjoys chess and has played games with people on earth while living in the ISS.
