= Midnight Magic =

Midnight Magic may refer to:

- Midnight Magic (album), a 1979 album by the Commodores
- Midnight Magic (video game), a 1986 pinball video game for the Atari 2600
- Midnight Magic (novel), a 1999 novel by Avi

== See also ==
- David's Midnight Magic, a 1982 pinball video game
