= KoalaPad =

1980s computer graphics tablet

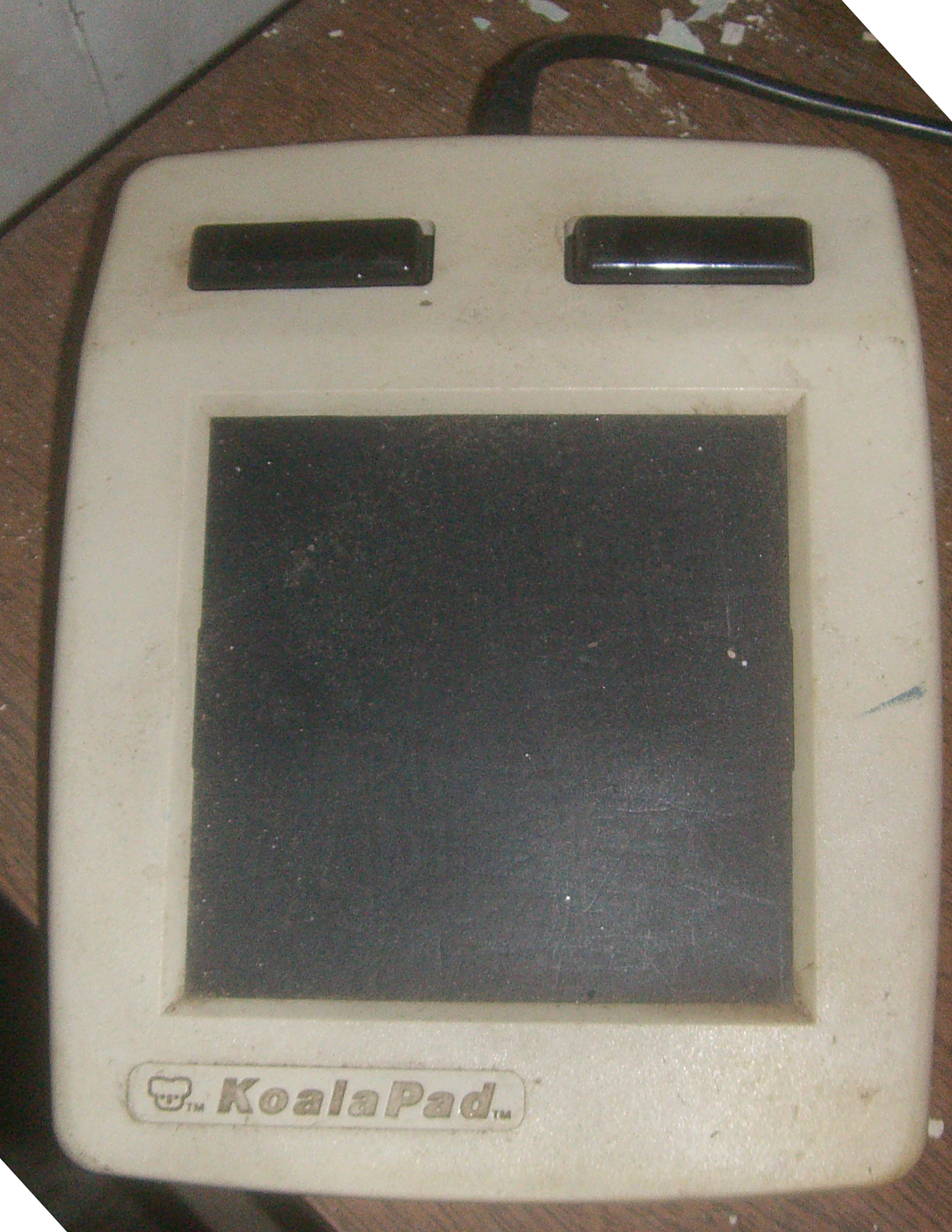
- KoalaPad
- Developer: Koala Technologies Corporation
- Type: Graphics tablet
- Released: 1983
- Input: drawing stylus, finger
- Dimensions: 6 × 8 × 1 inches

The KoalaPad is a graphics tablet, released in 1983 by US company Koala Technologies Corporation, for the Apple II, TRS-80 Color Computer (as the TRS-80 Touch Pad), Atari 8-bit computers, Commodore 64, and IBM PC compatibles.

Originally designed by Dr. David Thornburg as a low-cost computer drawing tool for schools, the Koala Pad and the bundled drawing program, KoalaPainter, was popular with home users as well. KoalaPainter was called KoalaPaint in some versions for the Apple II, and PC Design for the IBM PC. A program called Graphics Exhibitor was included for creating slideshow presentations from KoalaPainter drawings.

== Description ==
The pad was four inches square (i.e. roughly 10×10 cm) and mounted on a slightly inclined base with the back of the pad higher than the front. At the top, "behind" the pad, were two buttons. The pad hooked into the computer using the analog signals of the joystick ports (the so-called paddle inputs), which meant that it had a low resolution and tended to jostle the cursor if moved during use.

As an alternative to the drawing stylus, the pad could as easily be operated by the user's fingers for tasks that demanded less precision, such as selecting between menu items (thus using the pad as a kind of "indirect touch screen").

The top-mounted buttons tended to be somewhat frustrating to use, as the user had to "reach around" the stylus to push the buttons in order to start or stop drawing. A similar tablet from Atari, the Atari CX77 Touch Tablet, addressed this with a built-in button on the stylus, which some enterprising users adapted for use with their KoalaPad.

== KoalaPainter ==
KoalaPainter
- C64 KoalaPainter menu screen. The "undo" command is called "Oops" (2nd row, left). The lowermost part of the screen contains the color choice chart (16 pure colors, 16 dithered). Immediately above the color chart is the brush shape bar (8 different shapes).
- Developers: Audio Light (C64); Island Graphics (Apple II, Atari 8-bit)
- Release: 1983; 43 years ago
- Operating system: Apple II, TRS-80 Color Computer, Atari 8-bit, Commodore 64, IBM PC
- Type: bitmap graphics editor
- License: Proprietary

The pad shipped with a simple bitmap graphics editor developed by Audio Light called KoalaPainter, PC Design or Micro Illustrator depending on the target machine (see release history). Although bundled with the pad, KoalaPainter could also be operated using an ordinary digital joystick.

One unique feature of the program, for its time, was that it held two pictures in the computer's memory, allowing the user to flip from one to the other—a function commonly used in order to study the differences between an original and a modified picture, and to copy and paste between two different pictures.

Some third-party bitmap editors could also be used with the KoalaPad, such as Broderbund's Dazzle Draw for the Apple II.

=== Release history ===
- KoalaPainter for Commodore 64 (1983) and Atari 8-bit computers (1983)
- PC Design for the IBM PC (1983)
- Micro Illustrator for the Apple II (1983), Atari 8-bit computers (1983) and Commodore Plus/4 (1984)
- KoalaPainter II for Commodore 64 (1984)

=== Reception ===
Ahoy! called KoalaPainter "a very powerful and effective color drawing package", and concluded that it and the KoalaPad were "excellent in ease of use, a fine choice for a beginner as well as young children". BYTE's reviewer stated in December 1984 that he made far fewer errors when using an Apple Mouse with MousePaint than with a KoalaPad and its software. He found that MousePaint was easier to use and more efficient, predicting that the mouse would receive more software support than the pad. Cassie Stahl in InfoWorld's Essential Guide to Atari Computers praised the tablet and its documentation, rating it "Excellent" among all categories and stating that "Playing with the KoalaPad becomes addictive. It does everything it claims to, and it does it well". She also liked Micro Illustrator, rating it "Excellent" except for "Good" for Performance. While criticizing the limited erase function, Stahl reported an undocumented feature enabling exporting pictures to other software.

=== File format ===
The Commodore 64 version of KoalaPainter used a fairly simple file format corresponding directly to the way bitmapped graphics are handled on the computer: A two-byte load address, followed immediately by 8,000 bytes of raw bitmap data, 1,000 bytes of raw "Video Matrix" data, 1,000 bytes of raw "Color RAM" data, and a one-byte Background Color field.

== KoalaWare ==
Koala Technologies offered more software beyond the bundled KoalaPainter and Graphics Exhibitor for use with the pad. Among these applications, marketed under the moniker KoalaWare (like KoalaPainter itself), was educational software for use with customized keypads and overlays, such as spelling tools, music programs, and mathematics instruction software, as well as software for "translating" graphical designs into Logo programs.
