= Rotational mouse =

Type of computer mouse

A rotational mouse is a type of computer mouse which attempts to expand traditional mouse functionality. The objective of rotational mice is to facilitate three degrees of freedom (3DOF) for human-computer interaction by adding a third dimensional input, yaw (or Rz), to the existing x and y dimensional inputs. There have been several attempts to develop rotating mice, using a variety of mechanisms to detect rotation.

== Mechanisms to detect rotation ==
Mechanisms using relative measures of rotation: These devices are able to detect that the mouse has rotated by so many degrees, but cannot accurately identify where the rotation started or ended, increasing their tendency to lose orientation.

=== 2-balls and 4-sensor sets ===
1985 4 saw the first mention of a rotational mouse by Nomura, H. and Saitoh, A., entitled "mouse" at the IBM Technical Disclosure Bulletin, vol. 27, no. 6, Novembre 1984. pp. 3423-3424.

Other 2-ball / 4-sensor mouse concepts, patents:

- "Cursor display apparatus" saw a mention of actually rotating objects on screen by rotating the input device, (1989).
- Guaiá - A three degree of freedom mouse (in Portuguese - Guaiá)
- Orientational mouse computer input system, (1992)
- Multi-dimensional input device, (1994).
- Positioning device reporting X, Y and yaw motion, (1995).
- Twin mouse digitizer, (2000).
- Pointing device having rotational sensing mechanisms, (2003).
- Multiple sensor device and method, (2005).
- Multiple sensor device and method, (2008).

Unlike the conventional mouse which senses z-axis and y-axis displacement only, these 2-ball or 2-sensor mice are also able to sense z-axis angular motion, calculated by the two sets of x-y displacement data .

=== Mechanical ring & rotary encoder ===
Within these devices rotation is detected by a mechanical ring. This mechanism was promoted by the Canadian company Handview Inc; however it apparently never made it to production.

=== Gyroscopes or accelerometers ===
A patent titled "Input device" was the first known application of gyros to a rotating mouse.

== Mechanisms using absolute measures of rotation ==
=== Tablet/Digitiser Puck ===
The patent for an "Absolute position controller" is the earliest known reference to this type of input device. However, it was the patent for an orientational mouse computer input system, which suggested using a tablet with a detectable pattern or grid and sensors in the puck for computer navigation.

The Wacom Intuos 4D Mouse puck was the first commercial rotating “mouse.” The product was not a standalone mouse but rather a tablet accessory.

=== Compass ===
The Orbita mouse is the first commercially released non-tablet rotating mouse. Licensed and commercialized by Australian company Cyber Sport, the Orbita is equipped with a patented compass mechanism which solved the problems which plagued earlier rotating mechanisms. The inbuilt compass provides the mouse with ability to detect rotation based on the Earth's magnetic field so that it can accurately maintain orientation once the ‘up’ direction is specified. The round design makes it completely rotatable, spinning freely on ball bearings, and is usable at any angle due to the ‘push and squeeze’ button configuration encased in a silicone soft shell. The mouse reports rotation as scroll wheel commands so compatible with most applications.

Due to the round shape the Orbita mouse is commonly confused as being similar to the original, circular USB iMac mouse. However, the two mice are functionally different, primarily because the iMac's mouse is not a rotating mouse. The Orbita, unlike the Puck mouse, is designed to be ergonomic, with the round shape lending practical aid to the mouse's spinning action, and is not a purely æsthetic trait.

== Related devices ==
- Rockin’ mouse: A 3D mouse that rocks, rather than rotates.
- Videomouse: A mouse that provides 6DOF
- 3D Controllers used as a complement for a mouse:

1. 3D Connexion Space Navigator : A USB motion controller for navigating 3D applications.
2. Spatial Freedom Astroid: A rotating orb input device used to move 3D graphics objects.

- Trackballs. For example, the Kensington Expert Mouse: A large track ball surrounded by a scroll ring.
- Gyroscopic mice:

1. Logitech Air mouse: A wireless mouse that can control a computer cursor by being moved through the air, equipped with media features.
2. Wii Remote: A motion sensing wand which is the primary controller for Nintendo's Wii console.
