= Blade Force =

1995 video game

- Developer: Studio 3DO
- Publisher: The 3DO Company
- Director: Gregory A. Gorsiski
- Producers: Robert Lindsey; Trip Hawkins
- Designers: Brad Engstrand; Michelle Breiner; Oren Tversky
- Programmer: Frank Sandoval
- Artists: Paul Xander; Rebecca Chow; Vince Arroyo
- Composer: Nick Lockwood
- Engine: Bill Budge
- Platform: 3DO
- Release: NA: 1995; EU: 1995; JP: 20 October 1995
- Genres: Simulation, third-person shooter
- Mode: Single-player

Blade Force is a 1995 third-person shooter simulation video game developed by Studio 3DO and published by The 3DO Company in North America, Europe and Japan exclusively on the 3DO format. Set on a dystopian sci-fi future in the year 2110, where the fictional city of Meggagrid has been overrun by criminals, the player is equipped with a flight suit created by scientist Dr. Franz Grubert known as the HeliPak in an attempt to overthrow the main criminal organization led by the Pitt family and bring order back to the metropolis. Its gameplay mainly consists of shooting action in third-person with six degrees of freedom using a main five-button configuration.

Headed by Electronic Arts and The 3DO Company founder Trip Hawkins alongside Gregory A. Gorsiski and Robert Lindsey, Blade Force was created by most of the same team that were previously involved with several projects at Studio 3DO such as Jurassic Park Interactive and features a 3D game engine created by Pinball Construction Set designer Bill Budge.

Blade Force has been met with mostly positive reception from video game magazines and other dedicated outlets that reviewed the game since its launch, with praise towards the presentation, texture-mapped polygon graphics and sound design, though some reviewers criticized other aspects of the title such as the gameplay.

== Gameplay ==
Gameplay screenshot.

Blade Force is a third-person shooter simulation game similar to Descent, where players are equipped with the HeliPak flight suit and must traverse through seven areas set in the futuristic 3D urban landscape of Meggagrid featuring six degrees of freedom to overthrow the criminal organization led by the Pitt family and bring order back to the metropolis as the main objective.

Before the main missions, players are introduced to a tutorial area by Dr. Franz Grubert to get familiarized with the controls and beneficial items that can be picked up along the way. After the tutorial is completed, players are tasked with various objectives to clear before proceeding such as capturing a designated criminal. If the players does not recover health, their player character will burst in flames and crash into the ground by enemy fire and once all lives are lost, the game is over, though players have the option of resuming progress by loading their saved game into the last mission reached.

== Synopsis ==
Blade Force takes place in the year 2110, where a fictional metropolis built from the ruins of Los Angeles called Meggagrid has been overrun by criminals. Scientist Dr. Franz Grubert had previously proposed a plan two years ago to equip the city's police force with a flight suit known as the HeliPak, but the government decided reducing the prison sentence to two years, cut funding for the remaining mental health centers and rely on aerial counter-terrorism squads as a cost-effective measure to control the increasing crime statistics. Due to corruption at the city hall, the city council did not adopt the proposed equipment and cut funds for Dr. Grubert, who was later permanently crippled during a bombing procedure. Seeking revenge against his enemies, Grubert plotted a plan to overthrow the main criminal organization led by the Pitt family, as the players are equipped with the HeliPak suit to carry on the mission.

== Development and release ==
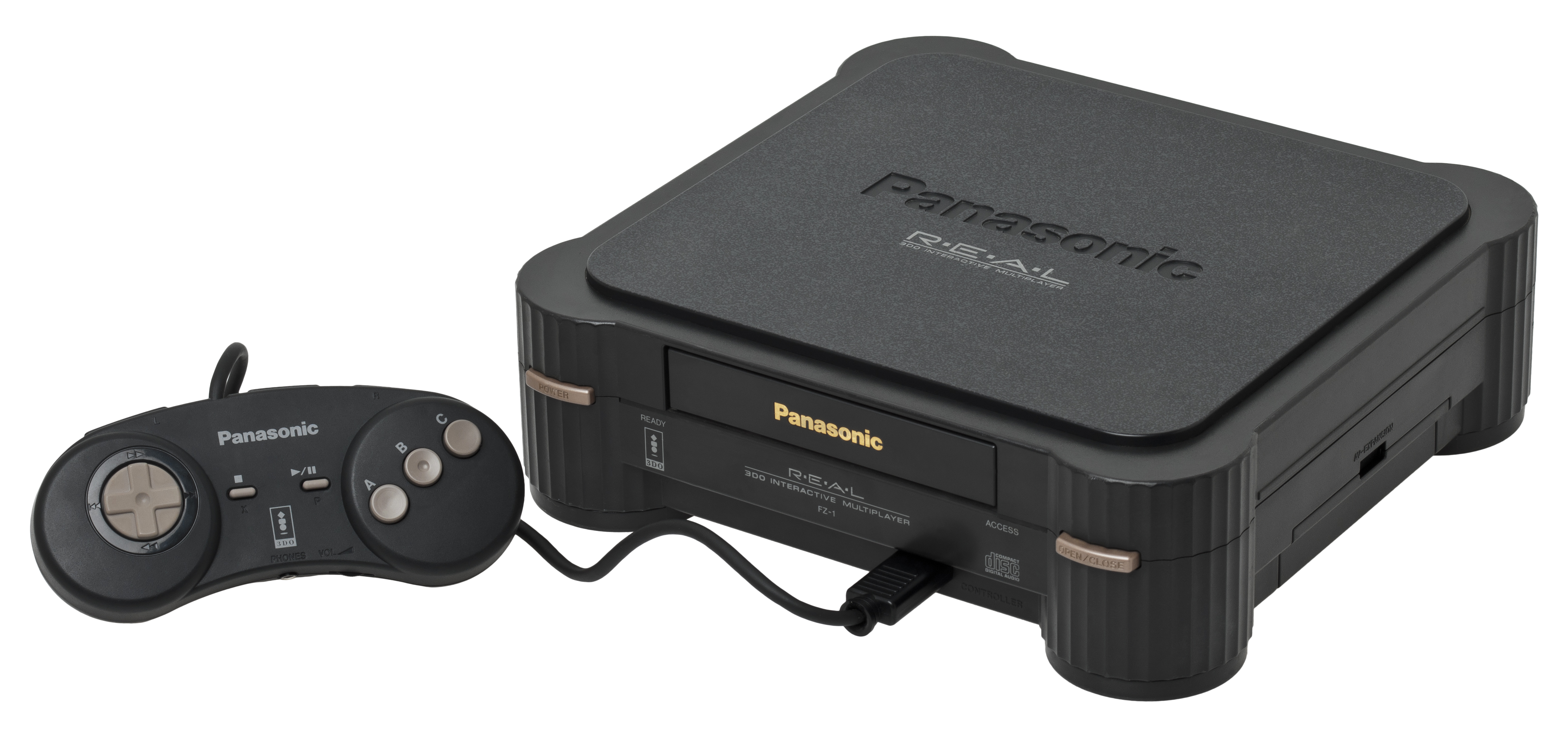
Blade Force for the 3DO Interactive Multiplayer features a 3D game engine by Bill Budge.

Blade Force was created by most of the same team that were previously involved with several projects at Studio 3DO such as Jurassic Park Interactive. Its development was helmed by Electronic Arts and The 3DO Company founder Trip Hawkins, alongside producers Gregory A. Gorsiski and Robert Lindsey, with Gorsiski also sharing the role of designer, director and writer with multiple members of the staff. Frank Sandoval served as project's sole programmer, while artists Paul Xander, Rebecca Chow and Vince Arroyo were responsible for the artwork. The soundtrack was written by composer Nick Lockwood, while Jeff Sutherland handled the sound design. Other members of the staff collaborated in its development including Pinball Construction Set designer Bill Budge, who created the 3D game engine. The game runs at 30 frames per second.

Blade Force was published by The 3DO Company across North America, Europe and Japan in 1995. Early previews prior to release showcased at events like E3 1995 featured several differences such as a different head-up display and gameplay perspective. Although the title was rated 17 in western regions, the Japanese release was rated E instead.

== Reception ==
Reception

Aggregate score
Aggregator	Score
GameRankings	90%

Review scores
Publication	Score
AllGame	3.5/5
Edge	7 / 10
GameFan	249 / 300
GamePro	15.5 / 20
Next Generation	5/5
3DO Magazine	4/5
Coming Soon Magazine	4/5
The Electric Playground	9 / 10
Electronic Entertainment	4/5
Game Players	95%
Joystick	75%
MAN!AC	53%
Mega Fun	80%
Power Unlimited	69 / 100
Strana Igr	5- / 10
Video Games	59%

Award
Publication	Award
Game Players (1995)	Best 3DO Game of the Year

Next Generation gave five stars out of five, giving praise to the graphics and gameplay, and called it one of the best games for the 3DO system.
