= Virtual Pinball =

1993 video game

- Developer: Bill Budge
- Publisher: Electronic Arts
- Designers: Bill Budge; Nick Corea; Jim Simmons
- Composer: Mark Miller
- Platform: Genesis
- Release: NA: November 1993; EU: December 1993
- Genres: Pinball simulation Game creation system
- Modes: Single-player, multiplayer

Virtual Pinball is a follow-up to EA's 1983 Pinball Construction Set from the same author, Bill Budge, released 10 years later for the Sega Genesis. One to four players can choose from either 29 premade tables or design one using in-game editor tools. Designing options include ten different backgrounds and six themes, and a player can choose where objects are placed, the style of music, and the ball speed. Virtual Pinball lacks the unlimited floppy disc storage used by the original, and the ability to create self-booting disks that can be played without the construction set software.

== Gameplay ==
The player can play the 29 existing games, go to the blueprint plans, or play one of the ten user created games. It also allows the player to change the Game theme, Parts theme, Board background, Skill level, ball action, and music.

Workshop Mode allows starting with a blank game where up to 256 parts can be placed anywhere on the board. These parts include Bumpers, Flippers, Walls, Kick Walls, Targets, Tracks, Specials, Launchers, Blasters, and Grabbers. All of these items are related to items found on a real table.

A game starts with four balls. The ball is launched by pressing and holding the A button, with the time held determining the power of the launch. All left flippers are controlled by the D-pad, while all right flippers are controlled by the C button. Hitting B will nudge the table, and can be used in conjunction with the D-pad to nudge in a certain direction.

=== Scoring ===
Parts	Point Values
Small bumpers	100
Kick Walls	100
Spring	100 top surface
Rollovers	100
Sling Shots	100
One Way Gate	100 top surface
Large Bumpers	200
Ghost Ball	1,000 on release
Spinner	1,000 for each revolution
Drop Targets	5,000
Moving Targets	5,000
Pegs	5,000
Tracks	5,000 on entry
Worm Hole	5,000 on entry
Kick Hole	10,000 on entry
Jackpot	1,000,000 when active
