= Orbita mouse =

Consumer technology product

An Orbita mouse is a wireless three-axis rotating computer mouse. It was developed and patented by Cyba Sport and released in January 2009. The Orbita mouse combines rotation input with configurable button controls.

== See also ==
- Rotational mouse
- Scroll wheel
