= Raster Blaster =

1981 video game

- Developer: Bill Budge
- Publisher: BudgeCo
- Platforms: Apple II, Atari 8-bit
- Release: 1981
- Genre: Pinball
- Mode: Single-player

Bill Budge's Raster Blaster (or Rasterblaster on the disk label) is a home computer pinball simulation written by Bill Budge for the Apple II and published in 1981 by Budge's company, BudgeCo. It was ported to the Atari 8-bit computers. Raster Blaster closely resembles the Williams Firepower table from 1980.

While not the first pinball game for home computers, Raster Blaster set a higher bar for visual fidelity, and the next several years saw a flurry of Apple II pinball titles: David's Midnight Magic (1982), Night Mission Pinball (1982), and Budge's own Pinball Construction Set (1983).

== Gameplay ==
At the start of each ball, it is launched towards the four rollovers at the top of the table. Below these are located four bumpers, each with three targets on them; by hitting these targets the player can activate three "claws" to grab the ball. After all claws have grabbed a ball, all three balls are released at the same time for multiball. The initials of the game can be spelled by the player: the R lights when the upper rollovers are completed, and the B lights when the three targets on the right are hit. The game has two difficulty settings, and can be played by up to four players.

== Reception ==
Gameplay screenshot

Debuting in April 1981, the game sold 25,000 copies by June 1982, tied for fourth on Computer Gaming World's list of top sellers. BYTE praised the game's realistic physics, writing that "most microcomputer games that are versions of existing board or equipment games aren't worth the disks they're printed on, but Raster Blaster does not fall into that category!"

Raster Blaster was voted Softalk magazine's Most Popular Program of 1981.

Softline stated when reviewing David's Midnight Magic that it "ratifies Bill Budge's extraordinary program as a programming tour de force" and "proof of Budge's technical lead over his rivals", as Midnight was merely equal to Raster Blaster despite being nine months ("an eternity in the Apple II world") newer.

Compute! called the Atari version "addictive", although it noted some bugs.
