= Dazzle Draw =

Raster graphics editor for Apple II computers

- Original author: David Snider
- Initial release: 1984; 41 years ago
- Platform: Apple II
- Type: Raster graphics editor

Dazzle Draw is a raster graphics editor for the Apple IIc and Apple IIe. The program allows users to create bitmap images which can then be printed or used in other programs. Developed by David Snider and released in 1984 by Broderbund, the program is similar to MacPaint, released in early 1984. Snider previously wrote the Apple II pinball game David's Midnight Magic.

Dazzle Draw is designed specifically to take advantage of the graphics capabilities of the Apple IIc and Enhanced IIe. The program allows use of 16 colors and supports the creation of automated slide shows.

== Reviews ==
Dazzle Draw was reviewed on the December 1985 issue of Games magazine. It was praised for being easy to use "whether you choose a graphics tablet (preferred), a mouse controller, or a joystick" and considered to be "in a word, dazzling".
