= Pinball Construction Set =

- "Album cover" box
- Developer: BudgeCo
- Publishers: BudgeCo: NA: Electronic Arts; EU: Ariolasoft
- Designer: Bill Budge
- Platforms: Apple II, Atari 8-bit, Commodore 64, IBM PC, Mac
- Release: 1982: Apple; 1983: Apple (EA), Atari, C64; 1985: IBM PC; November 1985: Mac
- Genres: Pinball, game creation system
- Mode: Single-player

Pinball Construction Set is a video game by Bill Budge written for the Apple II. It was originally published in 1982 through Budge's own company, BudgeCo, then was released by Electronic Arts in 1983 along with ports to the Atari 8-bit computers and Commodore 64.

The game created a new genre of video games: the construction set. Users can build and play their own virtual pinball machine by dropping bumpers, flippers, spinners, and other parts onto a table. Attributes such as gravity and the physics model can be modified. Tables can be saved to floppy disks and freely traded; Pinball Construction Set is not needed to play them.

Versions were released for the IBM PC compatibles (as a self-booting disk) and Mac in 1985. EA followed Pinball Construction Set with Music Construction Set, Adventure Construction Set, and Racing Destruction Set all from different authors.

== Development ==
Title screen on an IBM PC

A blank pinball machine with the user interface visible using 4 color CGA graphics.

Bill Budge, author of the Raster Blaster pinball game for the Apple II, began developing Pinball Construction Set in July 1982. He did not want to write another game ("all the current (arcade) games are either maze games or Pong; I didn't want any part of that"), but began experimenting with game and graphical tools he had written. As part of the development process he purchased and disassembled an old Gottlieb Target Alpha pinball machine, so his new project could accurately depict its components. Budge does not enjoy playing video games, and described having to play pinball for months while developing Pinball Construction Set as "sheer torture".

The project was ambitious given the Apple's limited memory and graphics capabilities. While Budge did not work on the Apple Lisa project as an Apple employee from 1980 to 1981, he was aware of it and the Graphic User Interface research at Xerox PARC, and gave Pinball Construction Set a Lisa-like user interface. He originally published and distributed the game via his publishing company BudgeCo in late 1982; the box art was a photograph of the parts of the disassembled pinball machine. It did not sell well, however, as BudgeCo did not have the distribution network that other, larger companies did.

Budge agreed to have EA to publish his game when Trip Hawkins approached him in 1983. The EA version used record album-style packaging with an expanded instruction manual. Raster Blaster and other projects had already made Budge a celebrity among Apple II owners, and his name was much larger than the name of the software on EA's Pinball Construction Set box art.

A version for the Amiga was planned in 1986, but never released.

== Reception ==
Pinball Construction Set''s sales had surpassed 250,000 copies by November 1989, and it ultimately sold over 300,000 copies in all platforms.

Pinball Construction Set's scope and flexibility on a 48K Apple II was impressive. Steve Wozniak called it "the greatest program ever written for an 8-bit machine", and for thousands the software was their first experience with a GUI. Computer Gaming World in 1983 considered the software toy revolutionary, and easy to understand because of its representative icons and drag-and-drop method of constructing a table; the magazine stated that "there's something almost magical about the way this product works. You take everything it does for granted after just a few minutes". The nine-page manual was considered "overkill", since Pinball Construction Set required no programming knowledge; an eight-year-old had no problems creating his own tables. Reviewing the Atari version in their "Arcade Alley" column, Video magazine described Pinball Construction Set as a "remarkably clever and easy-to-use program", and noted that a third-party company had already published a suite of pre-made pinball games for use with the construction set.

BYTE found the tool kit as "complete" and praised Budge's "marvelous sense of programming". The magazine reported that "creativity is encouraged. [Users] are gently encouraged and aided. This is valuable for children and inexperienced players and computer users". InfoWorld compared the game's importance to that of Scott Adams's Adventureland, and predicted that it "is sure to have lots of children and grandchildren". InfoWorld's Essential Guide to Atari Computers cited it as a notable arcade game. Ahoy! called Pinball Construction Set as one of the best home entertainment programs of its era. The Addison-Wesley Book of Atari Software 1984 gave the "pinball wizard's dream" an overall A+ rating, praising the user interface as "exceptionally human engineered". Compute! listed it in 1988 as one of "Our Favorite Games", calling the game "a programming work of art ... a classic that never seems to grow old". Orson Scott Card said in the magazine in 1989 that the program was so flexible that his son used it as a graphics program.

=== Awards ===
In 1984 Pinball Construction Set received a Certificate of Merit in the category of "1984 Most Innovative Video Game/Computer Game" at the 5th annual Arkie Awards. One month later Softline readers named the game the ninth most-popular Apple and Atari program of 1983. Computer Gaming World in 1996 declared Pinball Construction Set the 50th-best computer game ever released, and ranked it #1 in the magazine's list of the most innovative computer games. Pinball Construction Set is an inductee in GameSpy's Hall of Fame. In 2008, Pinball Construction Set was honored at the 59th Annual Technology and Engineering Emmy Awards for "User Generated Content/Game Modification".

== Legacy ==
A version for the Coleco Adam combined with Hard Hat Mack under the title The Best of Electronic Arts was completed but not released.

In 1993, Budge wrote a version of Pinball Construction Set for the Sega Genesis with the name Virtual Pinball.

Will Wright cited the game as an inspiration.

In 2013, Budge released the source code to the Atari 8-bit version of Pinball Construction Set to the public on GitHub under the MIT license.

== See also ==
- Music Construction Set
- Adventure Construction Set
- Racing Destruction Set
