= David's Midnight Magic =

1982 video game

- Developer: Broderbund
- Publishers: Broderbund; Ariolasoft (EU); Atari Corporation (cartridge)
- Programmers: David Snider; Martin Kahn (C64)
- Platforms: Apple II, Atari 8-bit, Commodore 64
- Release: 1982: Apple, Atari 8-bit 1983: C64; 1987: Atari 8-bit cartridge
- Genre: Pinball
- Modes: Single-player, multiplayer

David's Midnight Magic is a pinball simulation video game written by David Snider for the Apple II and published by Broderbund in 1982. The game was published in Europe by Ariolasoft. A port to Atari 8-bit computers was released the same year, then the Commodore 64 in 1983. In 1987, Atari Corporation published a cartridge version in the styling of the then-new Atari XEGS.

== Gameplay ==
The Apple II original

David's Midnight Magic is closely modeled after the real-life pinball table Black Knight, released by Williams in 1980.

Players begin a game with five balls, and can earn extra balls. The game has magna-save near the top of the outlanes. The game can be played by up to four players. The bonus score is multiplied by a bonus multiplier. Balls could be trapped in a collector in the upper playfield, which released after collecting three balls, hitting an arrow, or draining down an outlane on the last ball.

In the Apple II version, high scores can be saved to the disk. The sound can be run through the cassette player.

== Development ==
Seeing Raster Blaster inspired David Snider to create a pinball video game. By September 1981 the game was half completed when Snider attended a computer conference and had a serendipitous meeting with Doug Carlston and agreed to become a developer for Broderbund.

The 1982 Atari version has four colours, reduced from the six colours in the Apple II version. The bumper cap has an apple on it in most versions, but this is changed to the Atari logo on the Atari versions.

== Reception ==
Reception

Review scores
Publication	Score
Home Computing Weekly	C64: 79%
Run	C64: A
Tilt	C64: 4/5
Your 64 Magazine	C64: 3/5

Softline stated that David's Midnight Magic "ratifies Bill Budge's extraordinary program as a programming tour de force", as it was only equal to Budge's Raster Blaster despite being released nine months later. The magazine concluded that "the fact that [David is] second should not dull the glitter of this effort". Computer Gaming World stated that Midnight Magic was a better game than Raster Blaster, but lamented the requirement of removing write protection from the floppy, thus voiding the warranty, in order to save high scores. The Commodore 64 Home Companion called the game "extraordinarily realistic ... complete with all the features that make pinball so seductive".

David's Midnight Magic won "Computer Game of the Year" at the 4th annual Arkie Awards, where judges described it as "a program that is both an exciting video game and a fairly faithful evocation of pinball mystique".

Another reviewer was disappointed with the Atari-800 version, finding nudge not to work, and more difficult to control with paddles than the Apple II version.

== Legacy ==
Atari Corporation released a pinball game called Midnight Magic for the Atari 2600 that plays differently from the similarly named David's Midnight Magic.

Doug Carlston of Broderbund said in 1983 that Snider earned "somewhere in the six figures" in royalties from David's Midnight Magic. David Snider's brother Eric later similarly used his first name in the titles of the game Eric's Ultimate Solitaire and the screensaver Eric's Cascade.

In 2005, a Visual Pinball recreation of David's Midnight Magic was created called David's Midnight Magic 2005 which is rendered with 3D graphics.

== See also ==
- Raster Blaster, 1981 Apple II pinball game
