= Midnight Magic (video game) =

1986 video game

- Developer: Atari Corporation
- Publisher: Atari Corporation
- Designer: Glenn Axworthy
- Platform: Atari 2600
- Release: November 1986
- Genre: Pinball
- Mode: Single-player

Midnight Magic is a pinball video game written by Glenn Axworthy for the Atari 2600 and released by Atari Corporation in 1986, although on-screen it displays a copyright of 1984.

Despite licensing the name from Broderbund, the Atari 2600 version of Midnight Magic uses a completely different table design from David's Midnight Magic, a pinball simulation published for the Apple II in 1982.

== Gameplay ==
Midnight Magic uses the CX40 joystick for activating the flippers and shooting the ball. Moving the joystick controller down pulls the pinball machine plunger back while pressing the joystick button shoots the ball into the playfield. The left and right flippers are activated by moving the joystick controller left or right. Hitting all five drop targets at the top of the table increases the bonus multiplier (2x, 3x, and so on). Extra balls can be earned when hitting the rollover targets at the top left and right corners of the table when the bonus multiplier is activated.

== Reception ==
Computer and Video Games rated it 81% in 1989.
