= Bill Budge =

American video game programmer and designer

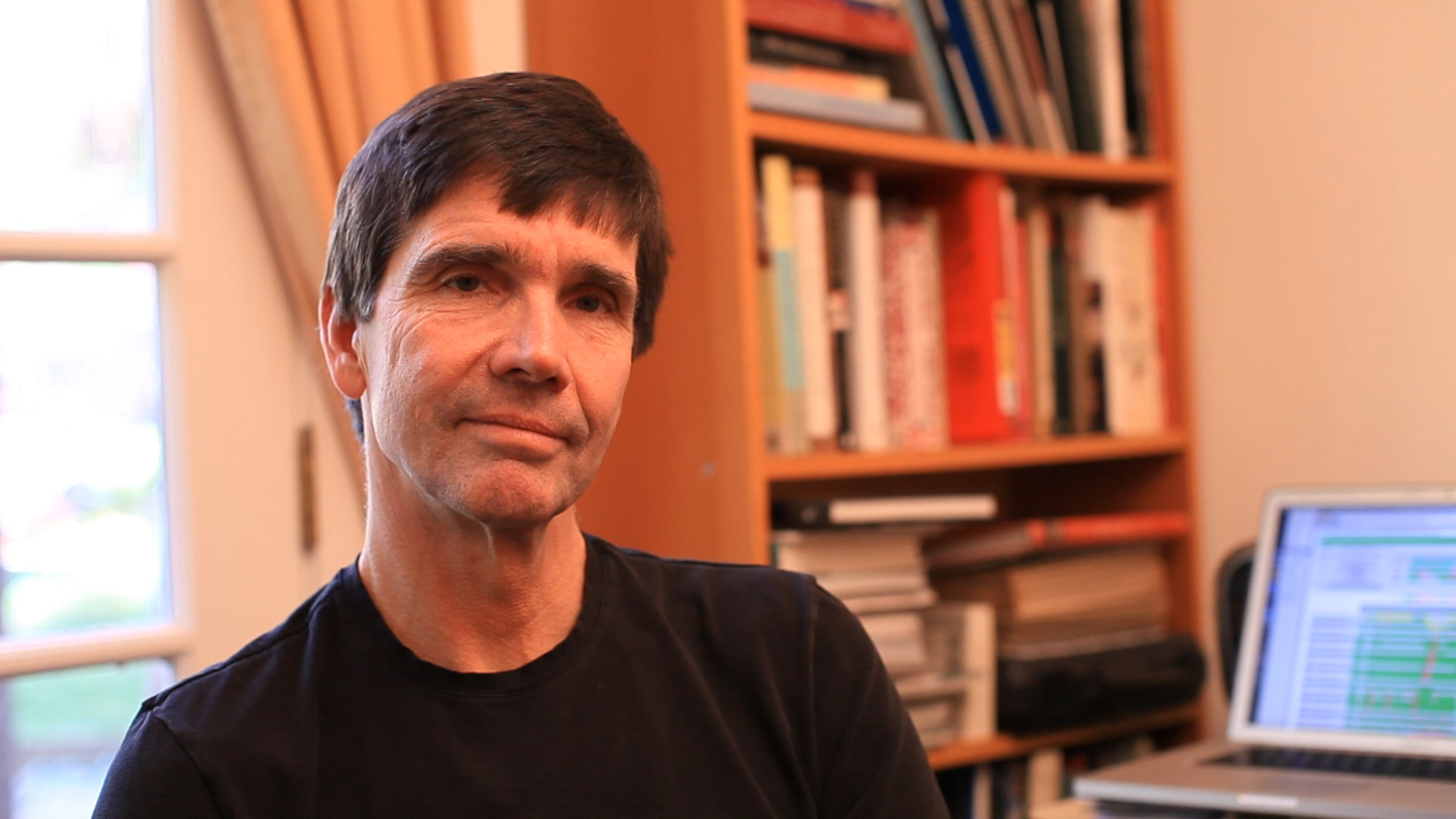
- Budge in 2012
- Born: August 11, 1954 (age 71)
- Occupations: video game programmer, designer
- Known for: Raster Blaster (1981); Pinball Construction Set (1983).

Bill Budge (born August 11, 1954) is a retired American video game programmer and designer. He is best known for the Apple II games Raster Blaster (1981) and Pinball Construction Set (1983).

== Early games ==
Budge says he became interested in computers while obtaining a PhD at UC Berkeley. He purchased an Apple II and began writing games. He enjoyed it so much that he dropped out of school and became a game programmer. Budge's first game was a Pong clone, called Penny Arcade, which he wrote using his own custom graphics routines. He traded the completed game to Apple Computer for a Centronics printer. California Pacific published a collection of four of Budge's Apple II games in 1980 as Bill Budge's Space Album.

An audience applauded with "audible gasps of astonishment" Raster Blaster and other uses of his graphics libraries at the 1981 National Computer Graphics Association conference. By then Budge's reputation was such that BYTE wrote in its review of his Tranquility Base, a Lunar Lander clone, that "Consistently excellent graphics are a trademark of Bill Budge's games", and InfoWorld described him as "graphics programmer extraordinaire". Budge marketed his games commercially with a floppy disk drive salesman who traveled from store to store; he and the salesman agreed to split profits of selling his games 50/50. Budge was shocked when he got his first check for USD$7,000.

Budge does not enjoy playing video games, and described having to play pinball for months while developing Pinball Construction Set as "sheer torture." He more enjoyed writing fast graphics libraries for game programmers. Budge said "I wasn't that interested in playing or designing games. My real love was in writing fast graphics code. It occurred to me that creating tools for others to make games was a way for me to indulge my interest in programming without having to make games." and "The way I got started was by not trying to do anything original at all. I wanted to learn how to write videogames. I ... just went to arcades and copied the games that I saw."

He created the 3-D Game Tool, a program allowing rudimentary creation of wireframe images on the Apple II for use in games or other applications. It was published in 1981 by California Pacific.

== Raster Blaster and BudgeCo ==
Budge first became interested in writing a pinball game while working for Apple in 1981. There was a pinball craze among the engineers there and it occurred to him that a pinball game would be a fun programming challenge. At that point he wrote Raster Blaster for the Apple II. Things like physics and collision detection were difficult on the Apple II's 1 MHz 6502 processor.

Budge formed his own company, BudgeCo to distribute Raster Blaster. He realized he could do what the big distributors were doing: putting the games in packaging— Ziploc bags—and delivering them to software stores. Budge and his sister, who also handled the accounting, would assemble the game packages in one of the rooms of his house and deliver them to local software stores.

== Pinball Construction Set ==
He followed Raster Blaster with Pinball Construction Set, a more general tool which allows users to create arbitrary pinball tables, including how the components are wired together. The project required him to write a mini-paint program, a mini sound editor and save/load systems. Some of the components he already had, which he developed for Raster Blaster.

By 1983, however, the computer game publishing arena had become too complex for Budge, who did not really want to be an entrepreneur. When he was approached by Electronic Arts (EA) founder Trip Hawkins (whom he had met when they both worked at Apple) to publish his games, he discussed the idea with Steve Wozniak and signed on. With EA's distribution, Pinball Construction Set eventually sold 300,000 copies over all platforms. EA marketed Budge and other early EA developers with publicity photographs by Norman Seeff, an appearance by Budge on Computer Chronicles with Hawkins, and author tours to computer and department stores.

Shortly after this, Budge disbanded BudgeCo, which he says was something of a relief for him, since he was really just a programmer and was not interested in being an entrepreneur.

After Pinball Construction Set, Budge attempted to create a "construction set construction set," but abandoned the idea after determining that it was too complex a concept. Royalties meant that he did not have to work, and EA eventually gave up asking Budge for another project.

== MousePaint ==
Budge wrote MousePaint, which was a program for the Apple II similar to the Macintosh program MacPaint. MousePaint was bundled with an Apple Mouse II and interface card for the Apple II. Apple Computer released the mouse and software in May 1984.

BYTE's reviewer stated in December 1984 that he made far fewer errors when using an Apple Mouse with MousePaint than with a KoalaPad and its software. He found that MousePaint was easier to use and more efficient, and predicted that the mouse would receive more software support than the pad.

== After EA ==
Budge ported Pinball Construction Set to the Sega Genesis, which was published by Electronic Arts in 1993 as Virtual Pinball. Ten tables can be saved, but they cannot be shared with other players.

Shortly afterward, Budge worked for 3DO, creating a 3D engine for Blade Force. He remained with the company for nine years until its demise in 2003. Budge returned to EA but stayed for less than two years. He joined Sony Computer Entertainment in 2004 as Lead Tools Programmer. Budge left Sony after six years for Google in 2010. Budge retired from Google in January 2022.

== Personal life ==
Budge and his wife live in the San Francisco Bay Area and have two children, Natalie and Andrew.

== Awards ==
In 2008, Pinball Construction Set was honored at the 59th Annual Technology & Engineering Emmy Awards for "User Generated Content/Game Modification". Budge accepted the award.

On February 10, 2011, Budge was the second recipient of the Pioneer Award from the Academy of Interactive Arts & Sciences.

Pinball Construction Set is an inductee in GameSpy's Hall of Fame.
