= Apple pointing devices =

Computer pointing devices made by Apple

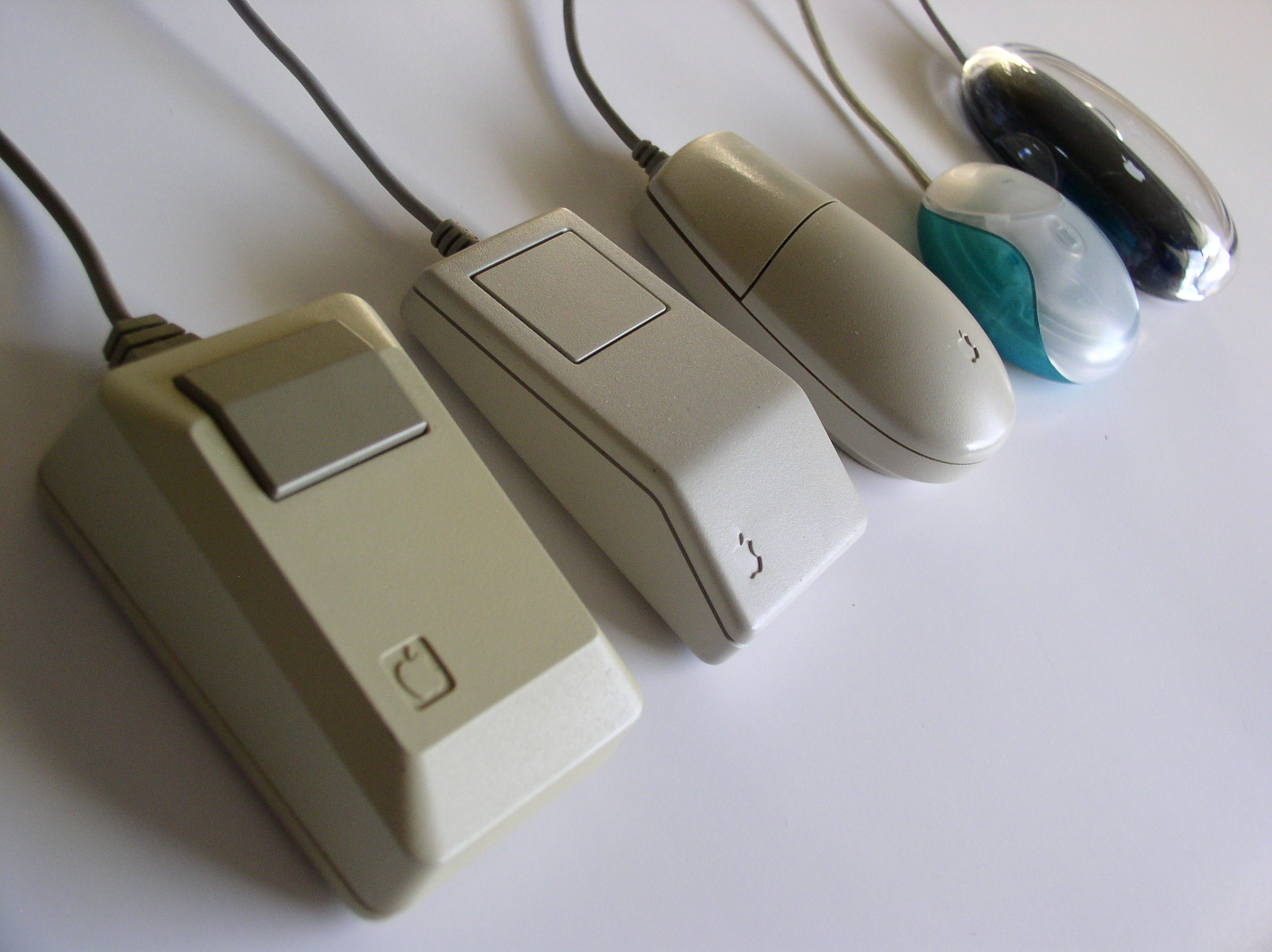
Various mice produced by Apple from 1984 to 2005

Apple Inc. has designed and manufactured several models of mice, trackpads, and other pointing devices, primarily for use with Macintosh computers. Over the years, Apple has maintained a distinct form and function with its mice that reflect their design languages of that time. Apple's current external pointing devices are the Magic Mouse 2 and Magic Trackpad 2.

== Mice ==
Mice manufactured by Apple previously only had a single-button control interface, until the Mighty Mouse in 2005, which introduced a clickable scroll ball and multiple programmable buttons.

Mice made by Apple contained a ball-tracking control mechanism, until the Pro Mouse in 2000 when Apple moved to an optical-based tracking mechanism. Apple's current mouse, the Magic Mouse 2, uses laser tracking.

=== Background ===
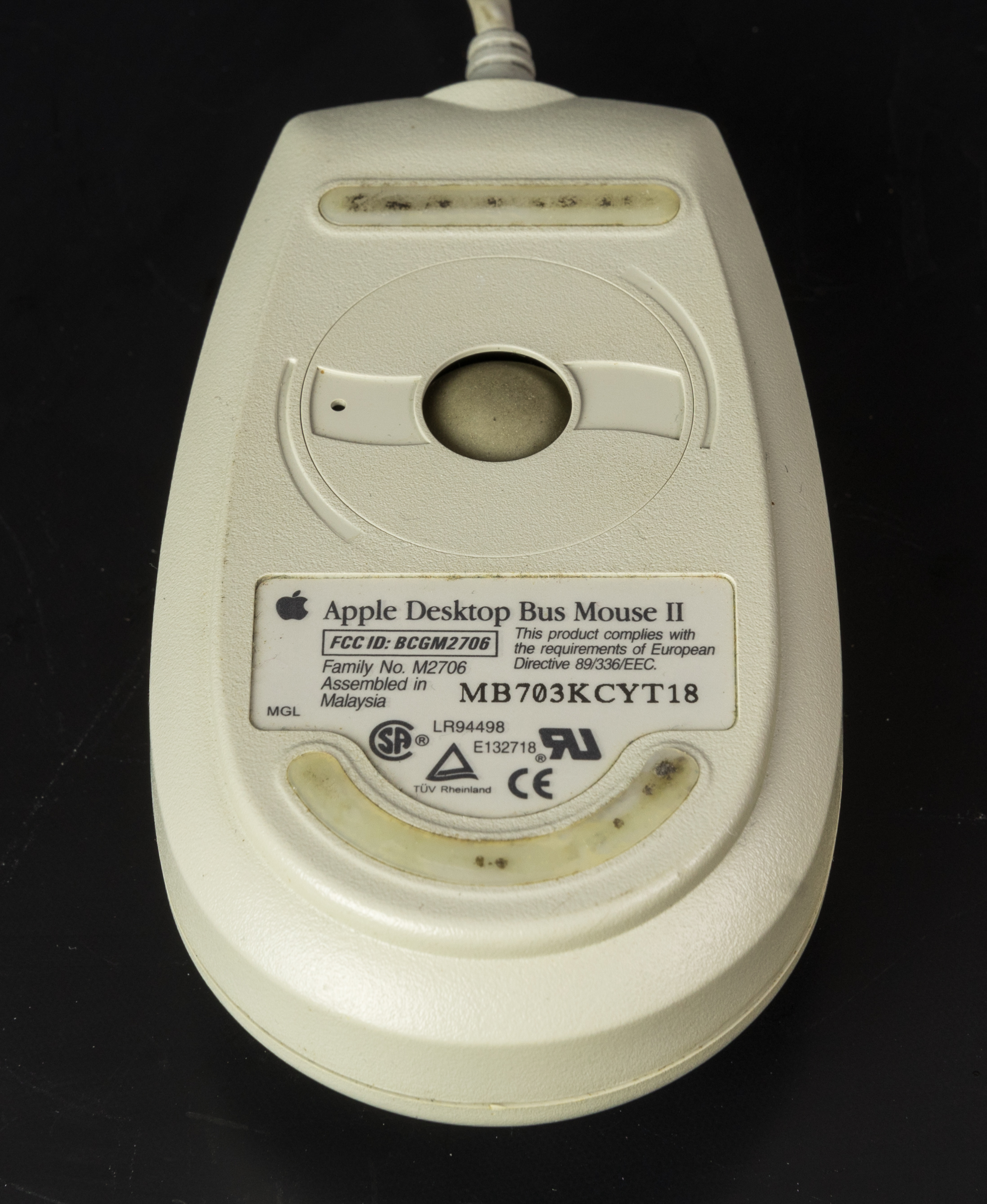
The rubber ball tracking mechanism of the ADB Mouse II

In 1979, Apple was planning to develop a business computer, and arranged a visit with the Xerox Parc research center to view some of their experimental technology. It was there they discovered the mouse, invented by Douglas Engelbart while he was working at SRI International (SRI); the mouse had subsequently been incorporated into the graphical user interface (GUI) used on the Xerox Alto. During an interview, Engelbart said "SRI patented the mouse, but they really had no idea of its value. Some years later it was learned that they had licensed it to Apple for something like US$40,000." Apple was so inspired by the mouse they scrapped their current plans and redesigned everything around the mouse and GUI.

One of the biggest problems was that the three button Xerox mouse cost over US$400 to build, which was not practical for a consumer-based personal computer. Apple commissioned Hovey-Kelley Design (which later became IDEO) to assist them with the mouse design, which not only had to be redesigned to cost US$25 instead of US$400, but also needed to be tested with real consumers outside a laboratory setting to learn how people were willing to use it. Hundreds of prototypes later, Apple settled on a single button mouse, roughly the size of a deck of cards. With the design complete, the operating system was adapted to interface with the single button design using keystrokes in combination with button clicks to recreate some of the features desired from the original Xerox three-button design.

=== Models ===
==== Lisa Mouse (A9M0050) ====
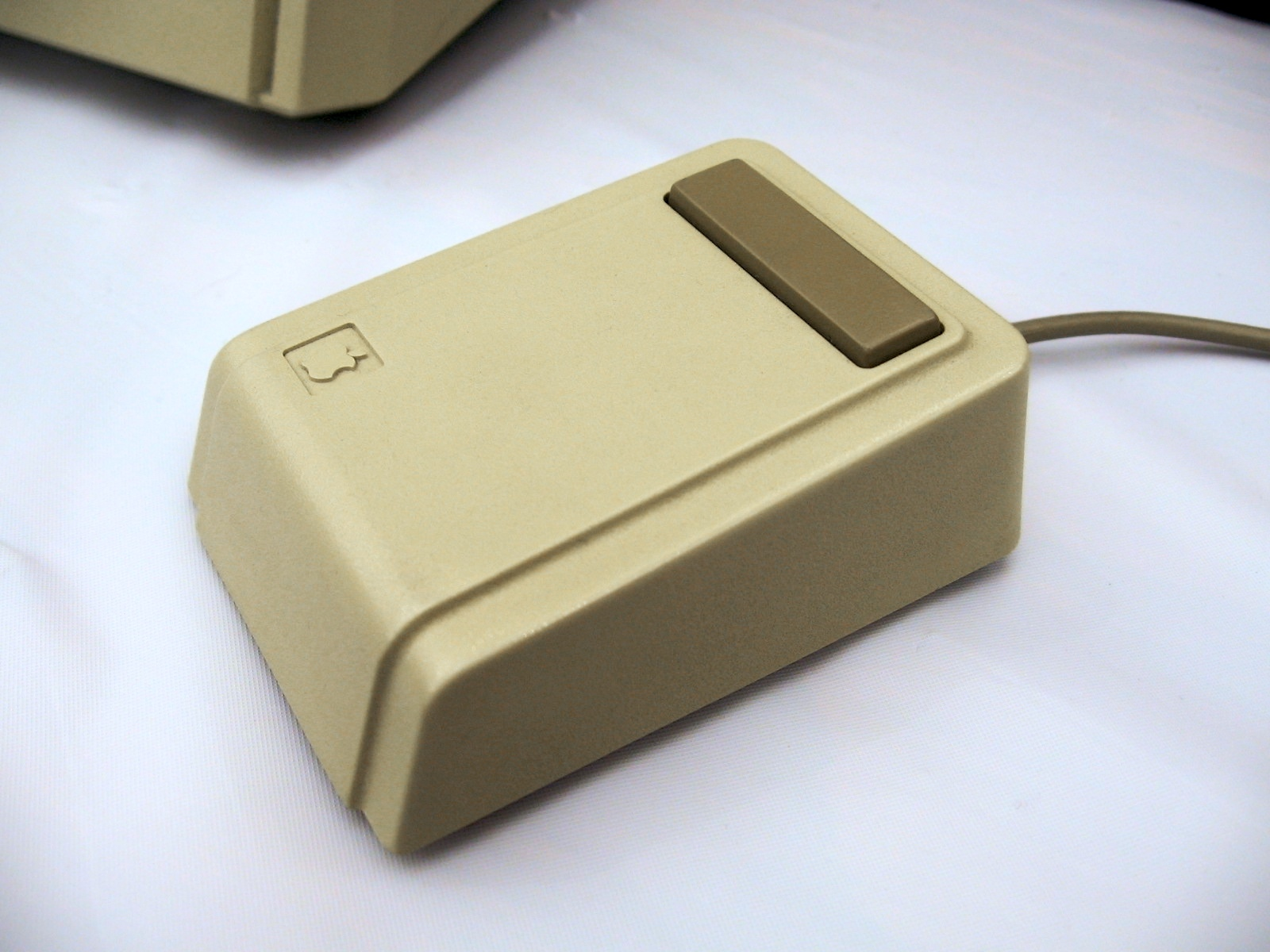
Lisa Mouse

The mouse created for the Apple Lisa was one of the first commercial mice ever produced. Included with the Lisa system in 1983, it was based on the mouse used in the 1970s on the Alto computer at Xerox PARC. Unique to this mouse was the use of a steel ball, instead of the usual rubber ball found in subsequent Apple mice. It connected to the computer by means of a standard squeeze-release DE-9 connector.

The mouse was developed by Apple, but designed by Hovey-Kelley (renamed IDEO in 1991), who built hundreds of prototypes and conducted exhaustive testing with focus groups in order to create an ideal shape for the Lisa mouse. The Lisa mouse was subsequently used as the foundational design for Apple mice, until the introduction of the multi-button design on the Mighty Mouse in 2005. Every single aspect of the mouse was researched and developed, from how many buttons to include, to how loud the click should be. The original case design was designed by Bill Dresselhaus, and incorporated an Art Deco-inspired style with formal curving lines to match the Lisa design language.

==== Macintosh Mouse (M0100) ====
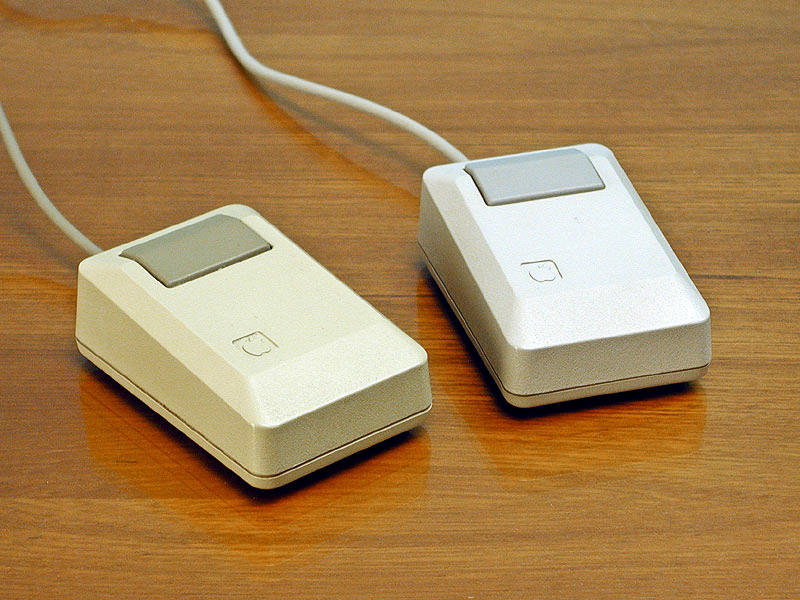
Macintosh Mouse (beige & Platinum colors shown)

The Macintosh mouse was very similar to the original Lisa mouse, with both mice being compatible with the Lisa and Macintosh. The Macintosh mouse's case was a slightly darker brown than Lisa's beige coloring and it had less formal lines, with a thick chamfer around its edges to match the Macintosh case. Mechanically, the Lisa's steel ball was replaced by a rubber covered steel ball, but otherwise connected with the same DE-9 connectors, though updated with a square-shape and standard thumb screws.

When the Macintosh Plus debuted in 1986, Apple made minor revisions to the mouse mechanism, and introduced unified cable connectors and a more consistent rounded shape. The following year, Apple adopted a uniform "Platinum" gray color for all their products. The Macintosh mouse had its final design change in 1987, updating both its color to Platinum with contrasting dark gray "Smoke" accents and minor mechanism changes.

==== Apple Mouse IIc ====
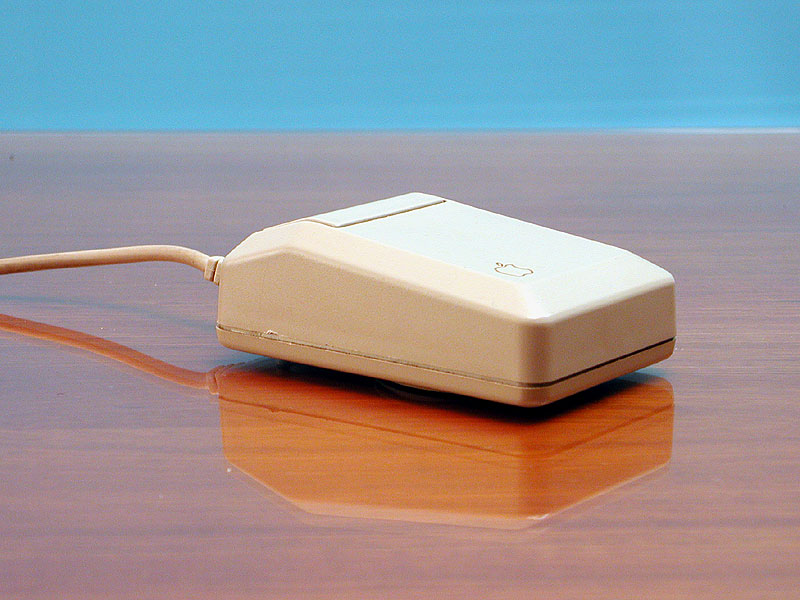
Apple Mouse IIc

Four months after the Macintosh debut, the Apple IIc was introduced with the addition of an optional mouse (the M0100) to manipulate standard 80 column text. The mouse was similar to the Macintosh mouse, though it was in a creamy-beige color to match the IIc's bright off-white case and had a slightly modified design which was sleeker than the Macintosh's blockier shape. It also was uniformly the same color, eliminating the Mac & Lisa's contrasting taupe accents on the mouse button and cable. Unlike the Macintosh, the IIc Mouse shared a dual purpose port with gaming devices like joysticks. In order for the IIc to know what was plugged into it, its mouse had to send the appropriate signal. Despite these differences, it carried exactly the same model number as the Macintosh version.

The A2M4015, packaged for the IIc, coincided with a minor change in the mouse mechanism and connector style.

In 1988 the A2M4035 took on the identical physical appearance and coloring as the Platinum gray Macintosh Mouse. Unlike its predecessors, the USA manufactured versions of the Platinum Macintosh/Apple IIe mouse will work on the IIc too. All versions of the IIc Mouse will work with any Macintosh or Apple II card. As a result, Apple briefly sold the intermediate model as the Apple Mouse optionally for use across all platforms.

==== Apple Mouse II (M0100/A2M2050) ====
By mid-1984, Apple's commitment to bringing the mouse to its entire product line resulted in the release of the Apple II Mouse Interface peripheral card. Since this was a dedicated mouse port, Apple simply re-packaged the Macintosh mouse, but with the same creamy-beige cable and connector used on the IIc mouse and bundled it along with special software called MousePaint for use with the Apple II, II Plus, and IIe computers. Like the original IIc mouse, it used the same model number as the Macintosh Mouse. Unlike the Mouse IIc, however, it can be interchanged with the Macintosh version, but cannot be used on the IIc. Due to the popularity of the Macintosh and shortage of mice, Apple later repackaged the original Apple Mouse IIc in this bundle as well since it was cross-platform compatible. The AppleMouse II and its successors were never included as standard equipment on any computer.

==== Apple Mouse (A2M4015) ====
Since the original Apple Mouse IIc was compatible across all platforms, Apple renamed the mouse in 1985 and offered it as an optional purchase for all computers and separate from the Apple II interface card. It featured an updated mechanism and the new uniform rounded cable connector. Apple would briefly reuse this name later for a re-badged Apple Pro Mouse.

==== Apple Mouse IIe (A2M2070) ====
By 1986, Apple had updated its product lines with new cable connectors. With the Apple IIe already three years old, the AppleMouse II was re-badged for the IIe alone and essentially used a repackaged Macintosh Mouse with no modifications. Later it would also use the Platinum Macintosh version. The US-manufactured version of the Platinum mouse is also interchangeable with the identical-looking IIc mouse.

==== Apple Desktop Bus Mouse (G5431/A9M0331) ====
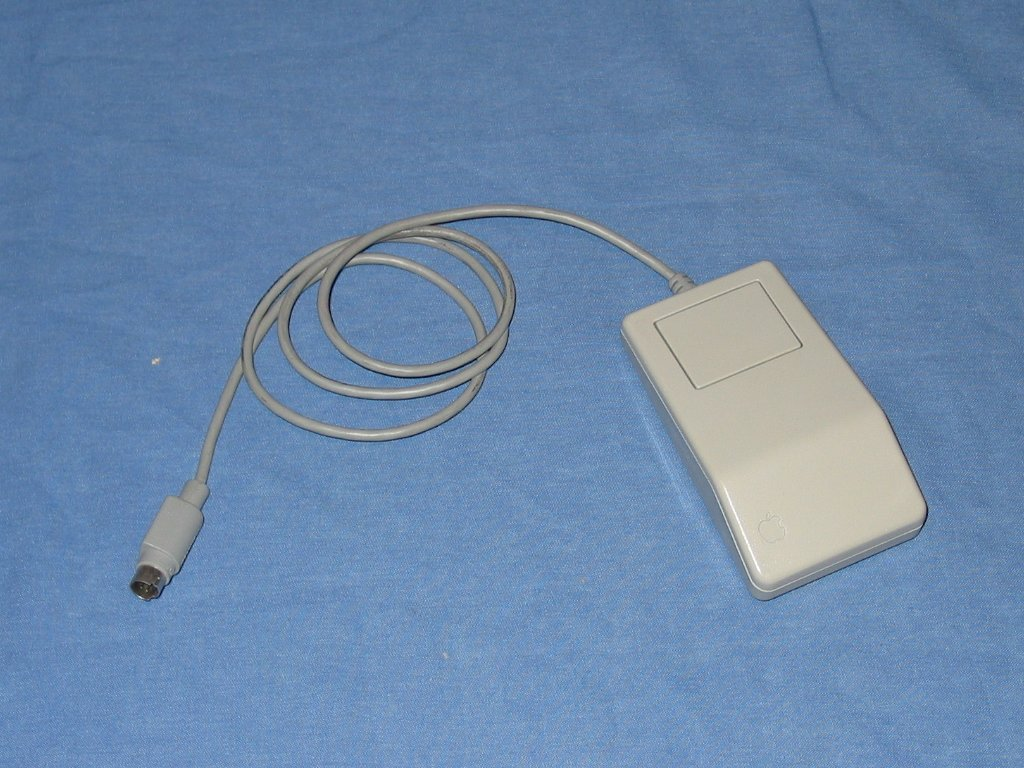
ADB Mouse

In September 1986, Apple continued a year of major change by converting its mice and keyboards to the Apple Desktop Bus (ADB). Newly redesigned, this mouse retained the blocky footprint of its predecessor, but had a lower, triangular profile. The first official Snow White design language mouse (the Apple Mouse IIc was technically the first), it was a uniform Platinum gray color, including the single button, with only the cables and connectors retaining the contrasting darker gray "Smoke" color. It was introduced on the Apple IIGS computer and later became the standard mouse included with all Macintosh desktop computers for the next six years.

There were a total of 3 mice of this type produced. The original was manufactured in Taiwan with 2 variations. 1 was sold with the Apple IIGS with the model number designation A9M0331. The other was sold with the Macintosh II and Mac SE with a family number designation G5431. Besides FCC ID numbers, both were exactly alike and came with a black track ball.

The other 2 were manufactured in the US and Malaysia with the family designation of G5431. Both identical to the Taiwan made mouse with the exception of a grey mouse ball.

==== Apple Desktop Bus Mouse II (M2706, M2707) ====
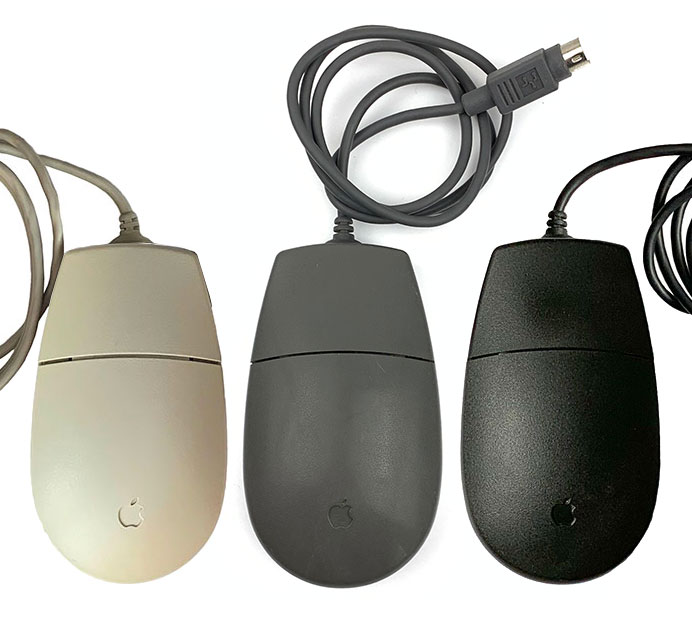
Platinum, gray and black Apple Desktop Bus Mouse II

In only its third major redesign in ten years, the Apple mouse shed its blocky exterior for rounded curves. The so-called tear-drop mouse, was essentially the same as its predecessor but with a new case subsequently held as the ideal shape of mice. Indeed, the basic design has persevered into current models, as well as being widely adopted by other mouse manufacturers. It was included with all Macintosh desktop computers from 1993 until 1998 in platinum color under the model M2706. It was also the first mouse produced by Apple in black to match the Macintosh TV as well as the Performa 5420 sold in black; also under the model M2706. A dark gray version was released in 1993 as a color coded accessory for the PowerBook 100 series under the model M2707.

==== Apple USB Mouse (M4848) ====
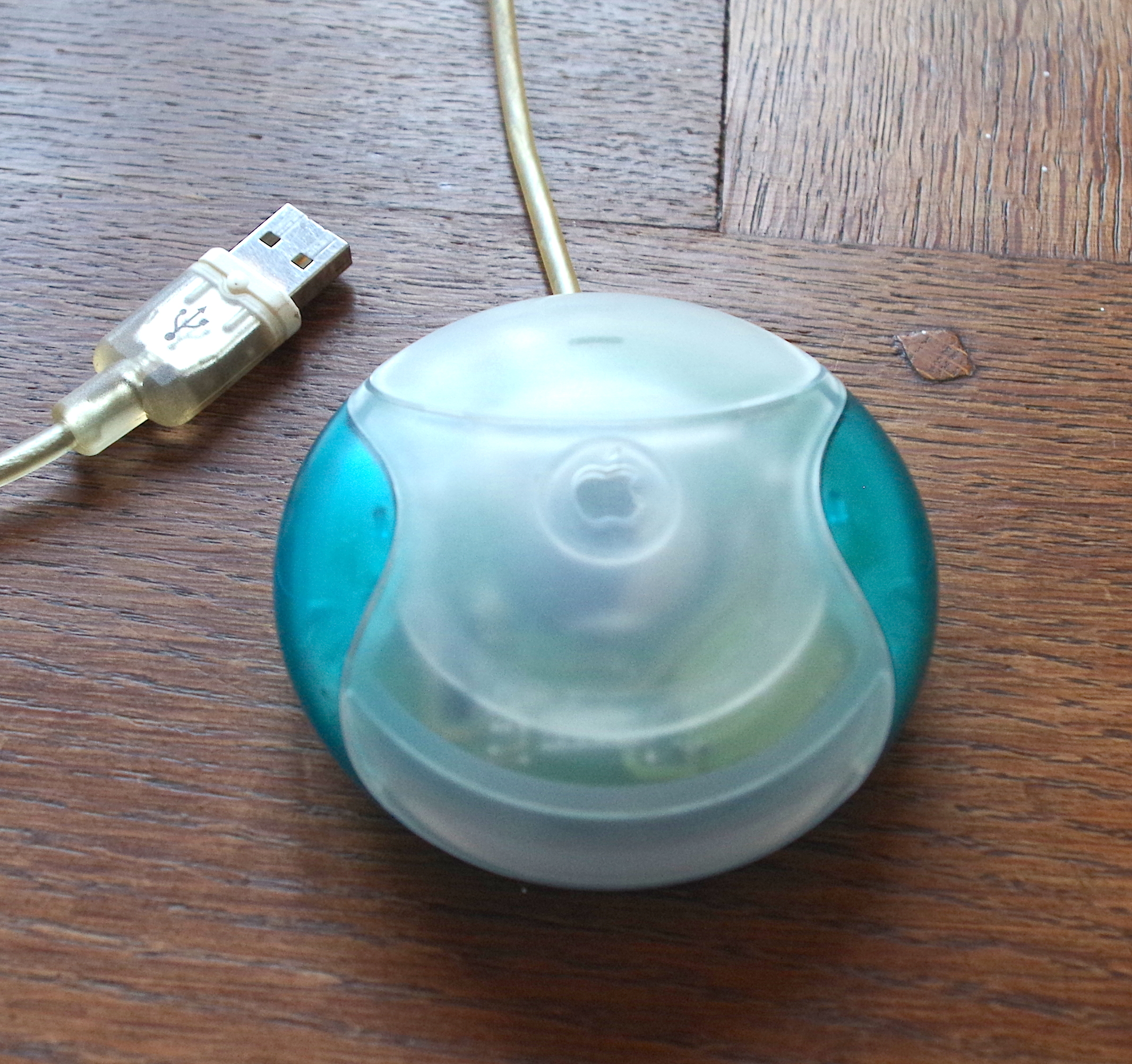
Apple USB Mouse

The Apple USB Mouse was Apple's first USB mouse. Released with the iMac in 1998 and included with all successive desktop Macs for the next two years, the round "Hockey puck" USB mouse is widely considered one of Apple's worst design mistakes. Marking the switch from ADB, the colorful translucent mouse was a radical departure from its predecessors, down to a ball whose two-tone surface fluttered past the user's eyes as it spun under the mouse's translucent housing.

However stylish, the mouse's round shape is widely considered clumsy, due to its small size and tendency to rotate in use. This was a major cause for the success of ADB to USB adapters, as they allowed for the use of the older, more comfortable ADB Mouse II to be used with those iMacs. Later revisions included a shallow indentation on the front of the single mouse button, but this was not enough to prevent a flood of third-party shells that attached to the USB mouse to give it the ADB mouse's elliptical shape.

Another flaw introduced in the Apple USB Mouse, shared across all of Apple's USB offerings, is the atypically short cord. Though intended for use through the integrated hub in Apple's keyboards (which have themselves had shorter integral cables since the USB transition, eventually prompting Apple to bundle keyboard-only extension cables with tower Macs), Apple's transition to USB coincided with the relocation of ports on their laptops from the center to the left edge.

==== Apple Pro Mouse (M5769) ====
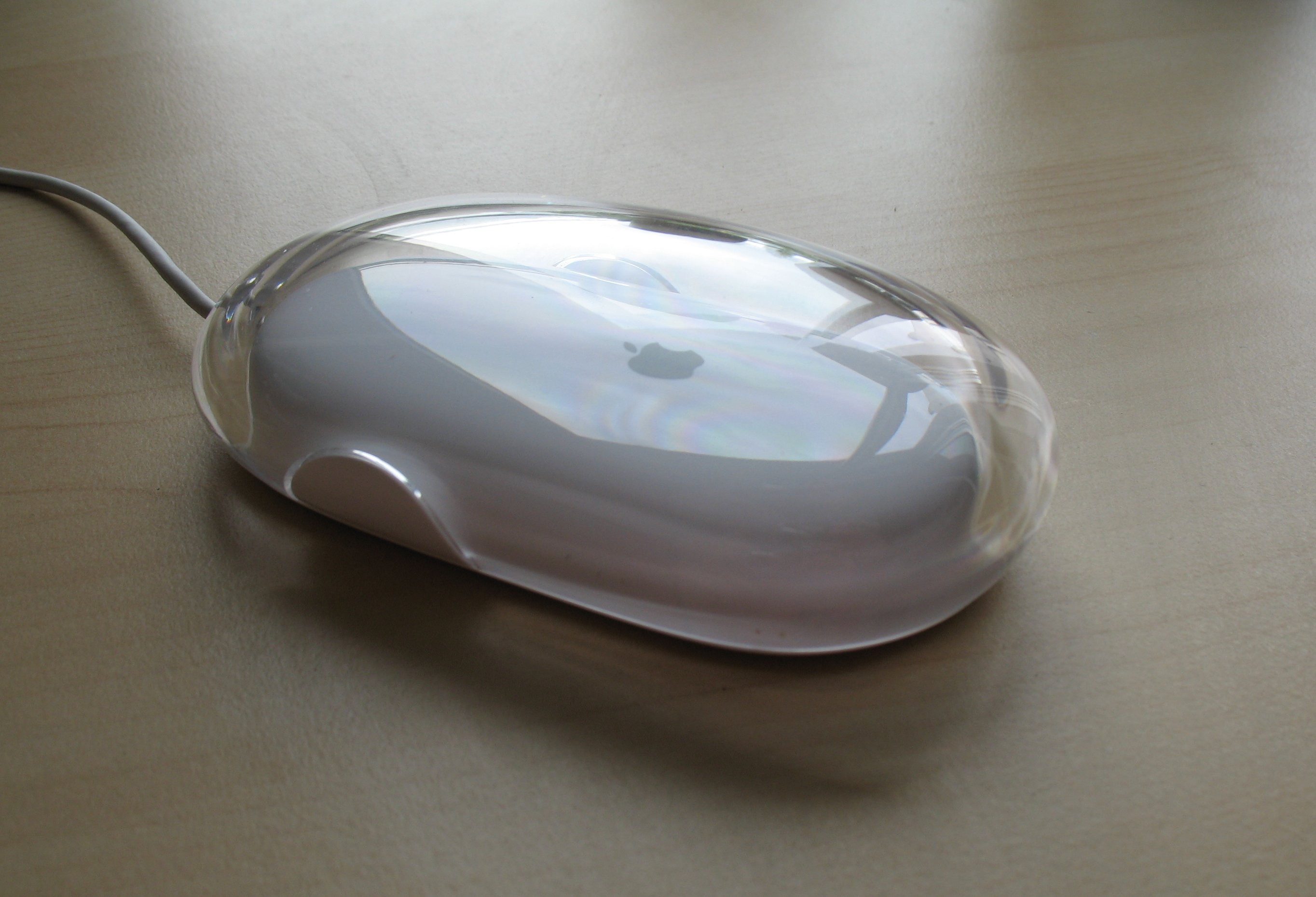
Apple USB Mouse – a revised version of the white Pro Mouse. Note how this mouse has white hand grips on the side, which differentiates it from the original pro mouse which had clear grips.

In a move away from the bold colors of the iMac and in a return to the styling of the traditional mouse design, Apple discontinued the USB Mouse in July 2000, and introduced the all-black Pro Mouse. A similar design to the ADB II mouse, the black Apple Pro Mouse was surrounded by a clear plastic shell. After taking years of criticism for their continuation of the one-button mouse, Apple effectively flipped the design of a "normal" mouse upside-down, with the sleekly featureless appearance that resulted inspiring its jocular appellation as "the first zero-button mouse."

This was the first Apple mouse to use a solid-state optical tracking instead of a rubber ball for its tracking mechanism. A dial is located on the mouse to adjust the mouse's click force. It was included as the standard mouse with all shipping desktop Macs, and was later made available in white. In May 2003, the mouse underwent a minor redesign, during which time the black version was discontinued, the click force dial was removed, and Pro was dropped from its name.

The Apple Wireless Mouse (A1015), a Bluetooth-based wireless version of the Apple Pro Mouse in white, was released in September 2003 as Apple's first wireless mouse.

==== Apple Mighty Mouse (A1152) ====
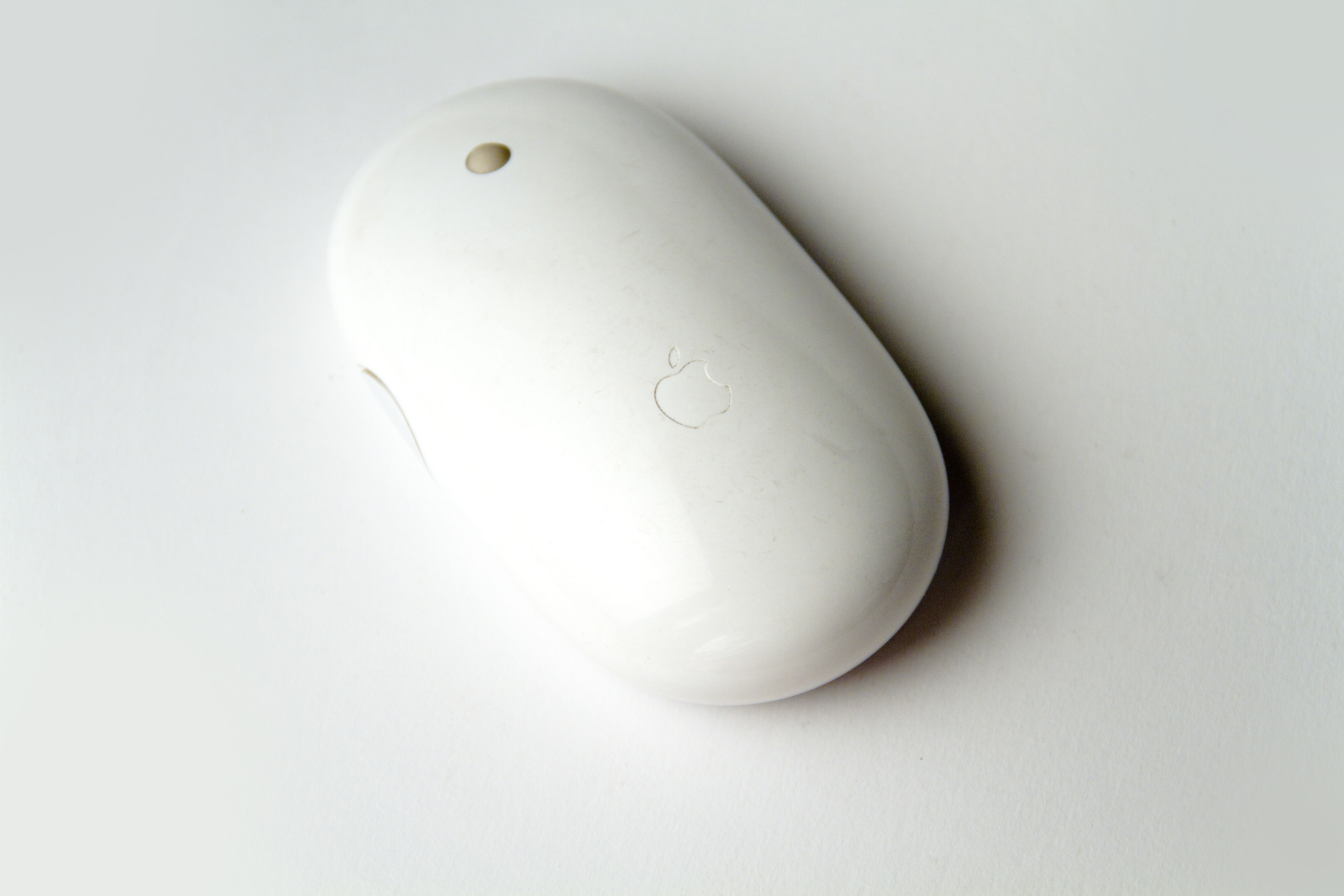
The wireless version of the Mighty Mouse

Previously included with all new Macintosh desktop models, it was a major departure from Apple's one-button philosophy integrated in its design since the Lisa. This mouse was called the Mighty Mouse but was renamed to just 'Apple Mouse' in 2009 due to legal issues with the name.

The Mighty Mouse includes a touch-sensitive button design that supports left and right click, as well as a scroll ball that supports 360-degree scroll movement. A wireless version (A1197) of the Mighty Mouse was also released, replacing the Wireless Mouse.

==== Magic Mouse ====
===== 1st generation (A1296) =====
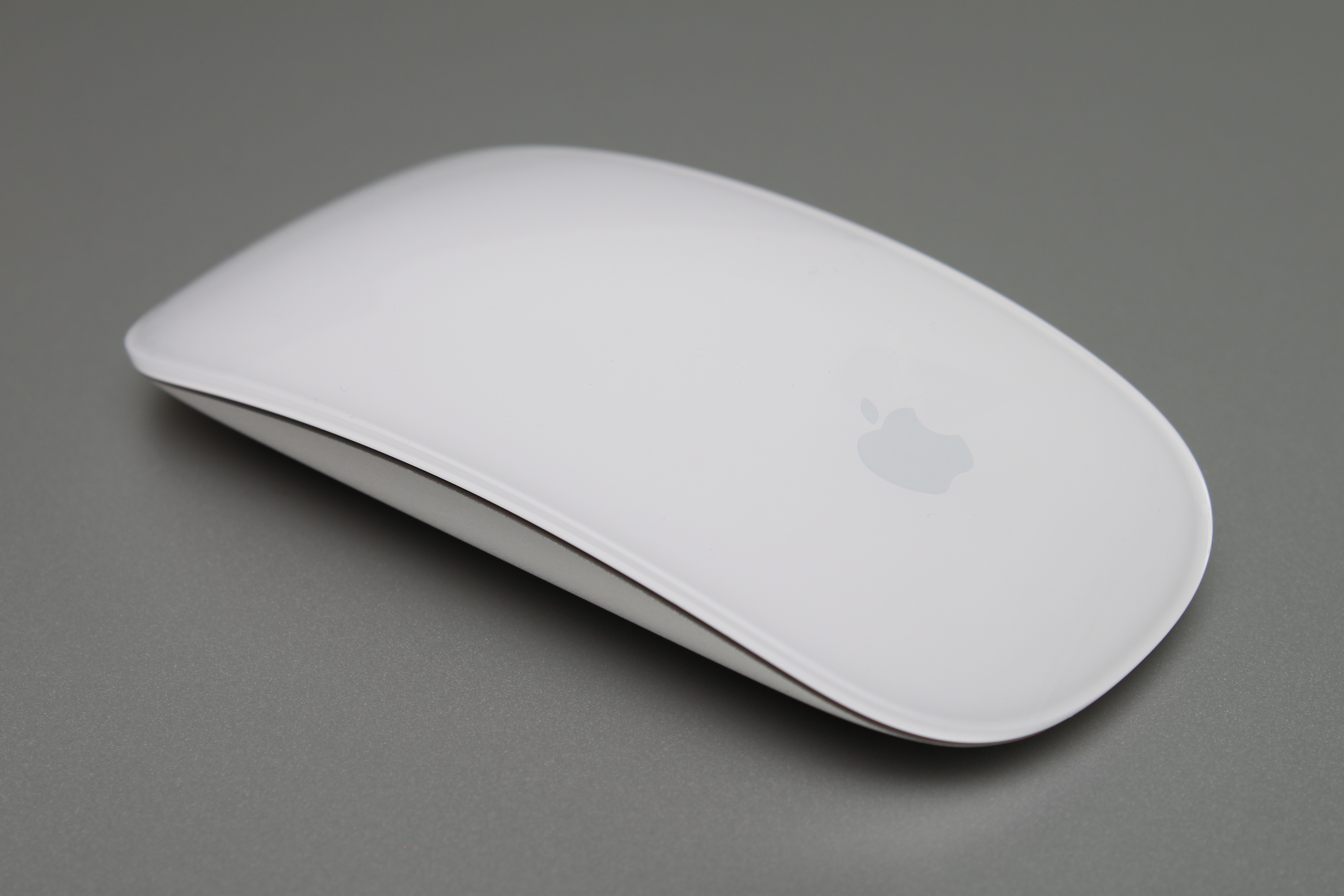
Magic Mouse

Introduced on October 20, 2009 as a replacement to the wireless Mighty Mouse, the Magic Mouse features a multi-touch interface similar to the iPhone, iPod Touch and MacBook trackpads. The mouse also includes wireless Bluetooth capabilities and a laser-tracking sensor. The Magic Mouse supports two-button click, multi-touch gestures and inertia scrolling in Mac OS X. The Magic Mouse was included with the iMac and the first-generation Mac Pro.

===== 2nd generation (A1657) =====
On October 13, 2015, Apple released a second-generation Magic Mouse (initially marketed as Magic Mouse 2), replacing the first-generation Magic Mouse. It is powered by a rechargeable Li-ion battery instead of AA batteries. The battery is charged via the Lightning port located on the bottom of the mouse. As a result, the mouse is unusable while charging, a design choice that was poorly received by critics. The Magic Mouse 2 has been included with the iMac, iMac Pro, and Mac Pro, and is also available as a separate purchase.

Recent versions of macOS and iPadOS include full support for the second-generation Magic Mouse. The mouse has been made available in many different colors; it has been available in a white and silver color since 2015, same as the first-generation Magic Mouse. A space grey color was introduced in 2017 to match the iMac Pro, a black and silver color in 2019 to match the third-generation Mac Pro, and a variety of pastel colors in 2021 to match the M1 iMac.

===== 3rd generation (A3204) =====
On October 28, 2024, Apple released a third-generation Magic Mouse, replacing the second-generation Magic Mouse. This 3rd generation Magic Mouse is identical to the 2nd generation, except the Lightning charging port is replaced by USB-C, which remains on the base of the mouse.

== Trackpads ==
=== Built-in trackpads ===
==== Notebooks ====
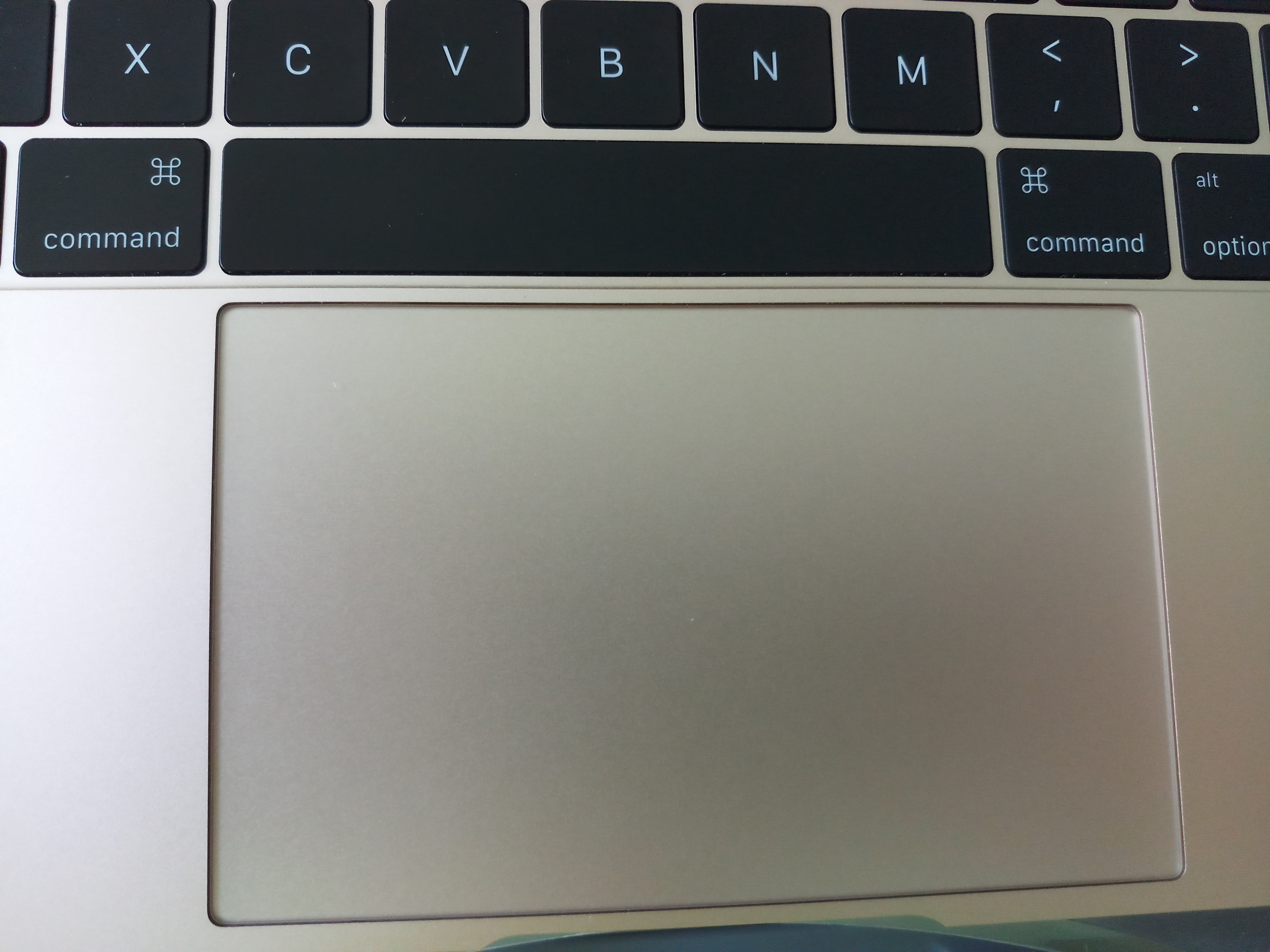
The Force Touch trackpad on a 12-inch MacBook

The trackpad is the built-in pointing device on all Apple notebook computers since 1995, and is colored to match the laptop case. The MacBook Air introduced a multi-touch trackpad with gesture support, which has since spread to the rest of Apple's portable products. Like Apple's single-button mice, all of their trackpads have no more than one button (though some early PowerBooks had a second physical button, it was electrically the same as the primary button) also like Apple's new mice, their latest trackpads—beginning with the unibody MacBooks and MacBook Pros—eliminated physical buttons.

Current MacBooks, starting with the 2015 MacBook, include a Force Touch trackpad, capable of detecting multiple levels of pressure, and has a solid-state design with no moving parts.

==== iPod ====
Starting with the iPod 2G, the mechanical scroll wheel was replaced with a wheel-shaped trackpad. Starting from the iPod 3G, the media control buttons and menu button were also made to be touch sensitive. On the iPod 4G and newer, it has the media control buttons and the menu button built-in to it (doing away with the touch sensitive media control buttons and menu button).

=== External trackpads ===
==== Twentieth Anniversary Macintosh ====
The Twentieth Anniversary Macintosh was the first Macintosh desktop to not include a mouse, and instead includes a trackpad which can be attached into the palm rest of the keyboard.

==== Magic Trackpad ====
===== 1st generation =====
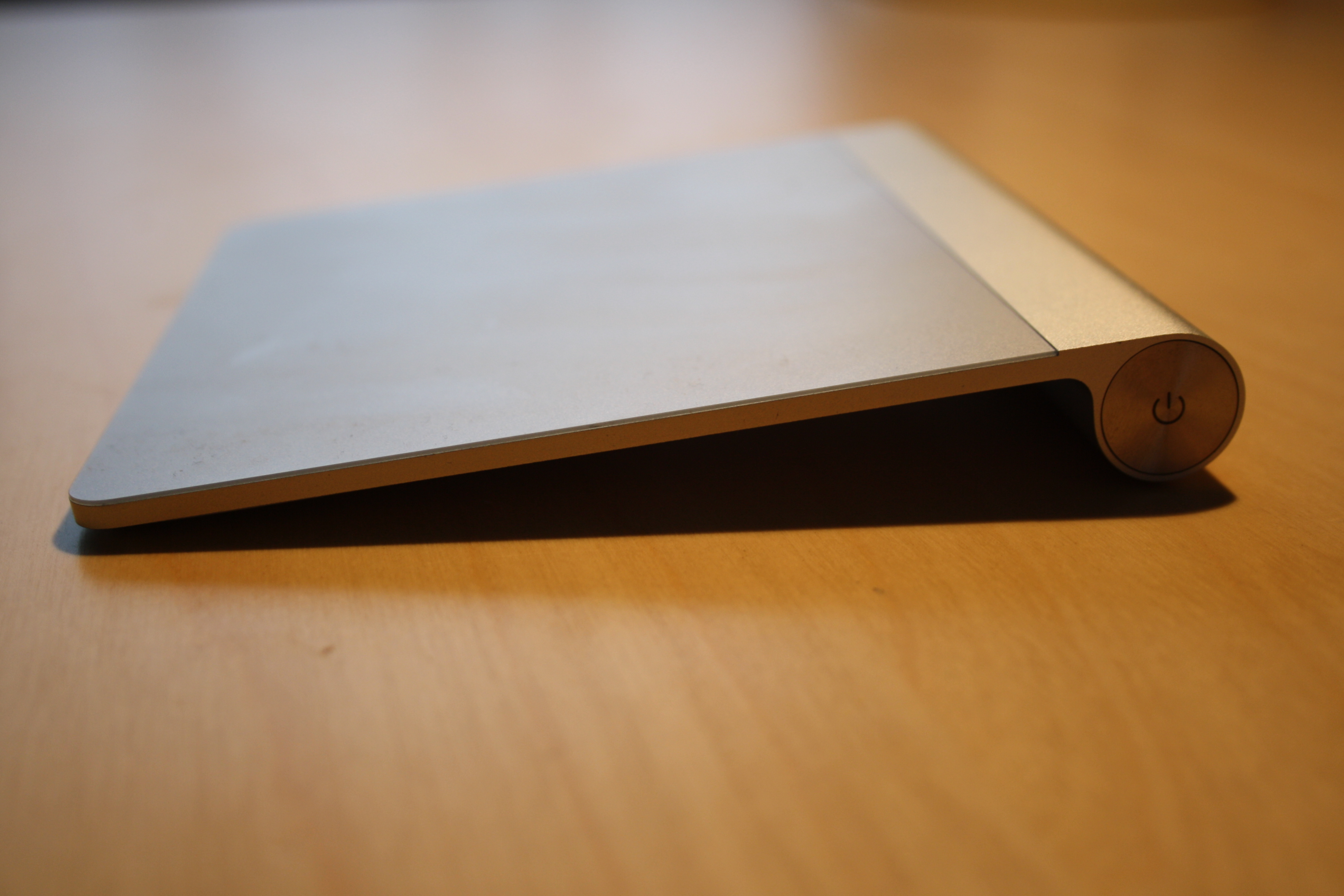
The first-generation Magic Trackpad

Apple released its first dedicated external trackpad, the Magic Trackpad, on July 27, 2010. It is a Bluetooth-only wireless trackpad, similar to the Magic Mouse. It is 80% larger than the MacBook trackpads of the time, and is designed to match the design of the Apple Wireless Keyboard. The trackpad's clicking mechanism is activated by two circular feet located on the bottom edge of the trackpad.

===== 2nd generation =====
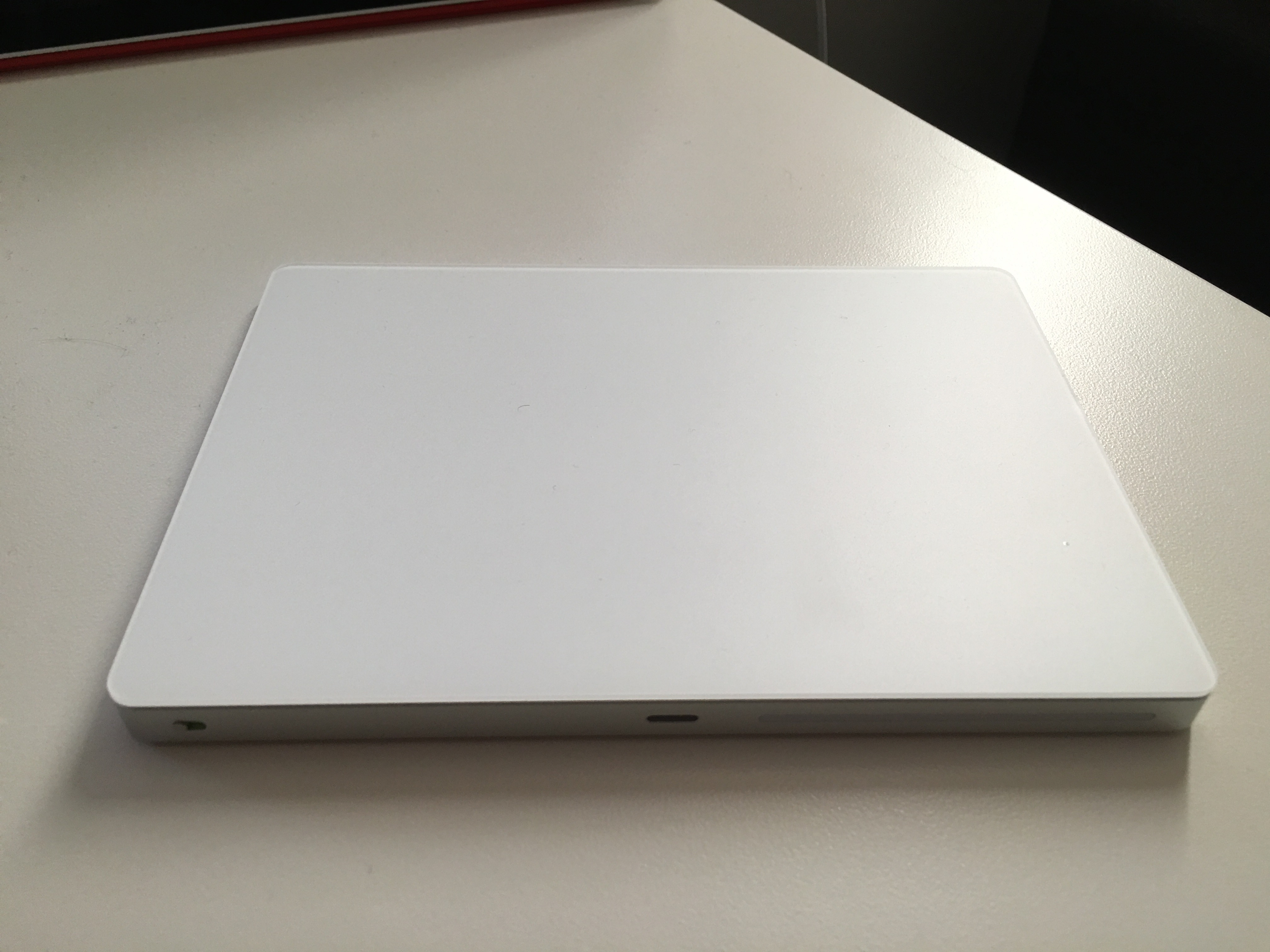
Magic Trackpad 2

On October 13, 2015, Apple released a second-generation Magic Trackpad (initially marketed as Magic Trackpad 2), replacing the first-generation Magic Trackpad. The second-generation Magic Trackpad is designed to match the Magic Keyboard, also released on the same day. It introduces solid-state Force Touch trackpad technology to desktop Macs, as well as a rechargeable Li-ion battery, charged via a Lightning connector. It is available as an add-on with the purchase of any desktop Mac, or as a standalone purchase.

Recent versions of macOS and iPadOS include full support for the second-generation Magic Trackpad. The trackpad has been made available in many different colors; it has been available in a white and silver color since 2015. A space grey color was introduced in 2017 to match the iMac Pro, a black and silver color in 2019 to match the third-generation Mac Pro, and a variety of pastel colors in 2021 to match the M1 iMac.

===== 3rd generation =====
On October 28, 2024, Apple released a third-generation Magic Trackpad, replacing the second-generation Magic Trackpad. This 3rd generation Magic Trackpad is identical to the 2nd generation, except the Lightning charging port is replaced by USB-C.

==== Magic Keyboard for iPad ====
The Magic Keyboard for iPad, released on April 22, 2020, is a keyboard case that includes a scissor-switch keyboard and multi-touch trackpad, to accompany the addition of mouse support in iPadOS. Apple released a modified Magic Keyboard in May 2021 to accommodate the slightly thicker 5th generation iPad Pro, which is also compatible with the previous Magic Keyboard, though it exhibits tighter fit.

== Other inputs ==
=== Paddle ===
Apple Hand Controllers II, Apple Hand Controllers IIe, IIc (A2M2001)
These paddles were the original Apple-branded game controllers.

=== Joystick ===
Apple Joystick II (A2M0055)
Manufactured by The Keyboard Company. The joystick could be used for many of the same functions as a mouse. The Joystick II has a beige-colored case and orange-colored fire buttons.
Apple Joystick IIe (A2M2002)
Manufactured by The Keyboard Company. The joystick could be used for many of the same functions as a mouse.
Apple Joystick IIe, IIc (A2M2012)
Mostly the same as the Joystick IIe (A2M2002) but with a gray-colored case and fire buttons.

=== Pen input ===
Apple Graphics Tablet (A2M0029)
The Apple Graphics Tablet was a large flat surface covered with a grid and had an attached stylus. Released for the Apple II Plus and later a modified version for the Apple IIe.
Pippin Keyboard
An optional keyboard accessory was provided for the Pippin, which had a large graphics tablet and stylus on the top half of its notebook-like hinged body.
Apple Pencil
The Apple Pencil is a stylus accessory for selected iPad models, intended for use when drawing or handwriting.

=== Trackballs ===
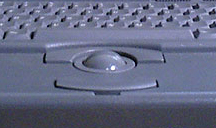
PowerBook trackball

Apple was one of the first computer manufacturers to include a built-in trackball into a complete system with the Macintosh Portable in 1989. The first entries in the company's PowerBook line of notebook computers put the trackball directly below the keyboard—a first for laptop design and a configuration which was borrowed by many competing Wintel notebook manufacturers in the mid-1990s.

Macintosh Portable
The Macintosh Portable was the first Apple machine to use a trackball, essentially a large palm-sized, upside-down ball mouse. The trackball was removable and could be placed on either side of the keyboard, or removed and a number pad installed in its place.
PowerBook
The PowerBook line scaled down the trackball to be thumb-sized and included one in every portable from 1991 to 1995 when it was phased out in favor of the trackpad.
Pippin controller ("Apple Jack")
The Pippin, developed by Apple, had a gamepad with a built-in trackball. Versions were made which connected via the Pippin's AppleJack childproof ADB connector, infrared, and normal ADB.

== See also ==
- Apple keyboards
- Timeline of Apple products
